= List of awards and nominations received by Twins =

Twins awards
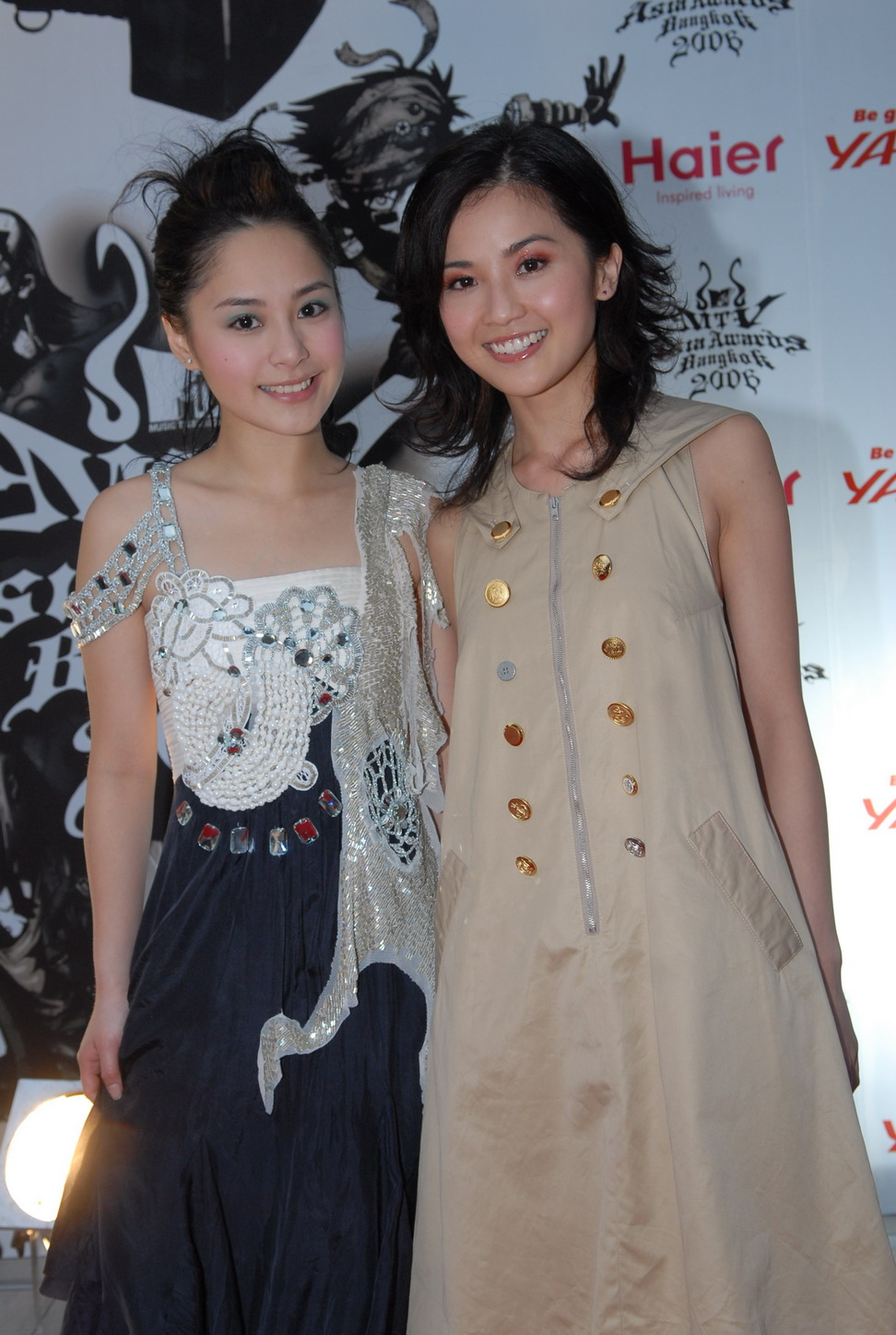
- Twins in 2006
Award	Won
Commercial Radio Hong Kong Ultimate Song Chart Awards	12
Global Chinese Music Awards	6
IFPI Hong Kong Sales Award	22
Jade Solid Gold Top 10 Awards	18
Metro Showbiz Mandarin Music Awards	1
Metro Showbiz Hit Awards	21
RTHK Top 10 Gold Songs Awards	20
Sprite Music Awards	1
- Total
Awards won	101

Below is a list of awards received by Twins since they were formed in 2001 as a cantopop girl group. They average to receive about 2-3 awards in each Hong Kong music awards. Their major accomplishment is in 2007 when they received the Asia Pacific Most Popular Female Artist Award from Jade Solid Gold Top 10 Awards.

Because of the Edison Chen photo scandal in 2008, Gillian took a short leave from the group. And thus the group did not record any songs or receive any awards between March 2008 to 2009.

== Commercial Radio Hong Kong Ultimate Song Chart Awards ==
The Ultimate Song Chart Awards Presentation (叱咤樂壇流行榜頒獎典禮) is a cantopop award ceremony from one of the famous channel in Commercial Radio Hong Kong known as Ultimate 903 (FM 90.3). Unlike other cantopop award ceremonies, this one is judged based on the popularity of the song/artist on the actual radio show.

Year	Award	Work	Result	Ref.
2001	Ultimate Group Award	Twins	Silver Award	
2001	Ultimate New Artist Award	Twins	Gold Award	
2001	Ultimate My Favorite Group Award	Twins	Won	
2002	Ultimate Group Award	Twins	Bronze Award	
2002	Ultimate My Favorite Group Award	Twins	Won	
2003	Ultimate Group Award	Twins	Gold Award	
2003	Ultimate My Favorite Group Award	Twins	Won	
2004	Ultimate Group Award	Twins	Gold Award	
2004	Ultimate My Favorite Group Award	Twins	Won	
2005	Ultimate Group Award	Twins	Gold Award	
2006	Ultimate Group Award	Twins	Silver Award	
2007	Ultimate Group Award	Twins	Silver Award	

== Global Chinese Music Awards ==
Year	Award	Work	Result	Ref.
2005	Top 25 Songs of the Year	星光游乐园	Won	
2005	Best Group	Twins	Won	
2006	Top 20 Songs of the Year	"80 Days Around The World" (80块环游世界)	Won	
2006	Best Group	Twins	Won	
2007	Top 20 Songs of the Year	飘零燕	Won	
2007	Best Group	Twins	Won	

== IFPI Hong Kong Sales Awards ==
IFPI Awards is given to artists base on the sales in Hong Kong at the end of the year.

Year	Award	Work	Result	Ref.
2001	Top Selling Newcomer	Twins	Won	
2001	Best Selling New Artist	Twins	Won	
2002	Top 10 Best Selling Cantonese Albums	Twins' Love 愛情當入樽	Won	
2002	Top 10 Best Selling Cantonese Albums	Our Souvenir 我們的紀念冊	Won	
2002	Top 10 Best Selling Cantonese Albums	Twins (2002 EP) 雙生兒	Won	
2002	Best Selling Cantonese Album	Our Souvenir 我們的紀念冊	Won	
2003	Top 10 Best Selling Cantonese Albums	Happy Together; Happy Together 新曲+精選	Won	
2003	Top 10 Best Selling Cantonese Albums	Touch of Love	Won	
2003	Top 10 Best Selling Cantonese Albums	Twins Ichiban 興奮演唱會 Amazing Show 卡拉OK LIVE	Won	
2003	Top 10 Best Selling Cantonese Albums	Evolution	Won	
2003	Best Female Selling Artists	Twins	Won	
2004	Top 10 Best Selling Cantonese Albums	Girl Power	Won	
2004	Top 10 Best Selling Cantonese Albums	Magic	Won	
2004	Top 10 Best Selling Cantonese Albums	04 Concert; Twins 零4好玩演唱會	Won	
2005	Top 10 Best Selling Mandarin Albums	"Cupid Apprentice" 見習愛神	Won	
2005	Top 10 Best Selling Cantonese Albums	Such a Better Day	Won	
2005	Top 10 Best Selling Local Artists	Twins	Won	
2006	Top 10 Best Selling Mandarin Albums	Around the World with 80 Dollars 八十塊環遊世界	Won	
2006	Top 10 Best Selling Local Artists	Twins	Won	
2007	Top 10 Best Selling Cantonese Albums	Our Love 我們相愛6年	Won	
2007	Top 10 Best Selling Local Artists	Twins	Won	
2008	Top 10 Best Selling Mandarin Albums	"Gillian's Words, Charlene's Speech" 桐話妍語	Won	

== Jade Solid Gold Top 10 Awards ==
The Jade Solid Gold Songs Awards Ceremony(十大勁歌金曲頒獎典禮) is held annually in Hong Kong since 1984. The awards are based on Jade Solid Gold show on TVB.

Year	Award	Work	Result	Ref.
2001	The best group	Twins	Gold Award	
2001	Community chest charity award	Twins	Won	
2002	The most popular commercial song	"Kite and Wind" (風箏與風)	Gold Award	
2002	Outstanding performance award	Twins	Silver Award	
2002	Community chest charity award	Twins	Won	
2003	The top 10 songs	"Next Station Queen" (下一站天后)	Won	
2003	Four channel award	Twins, Joey Yung	Won	
2004	The top 10 songs	"Girl Power" (女人味)	Won	
2004	The most popular commercial song	(超時空接觸) - Twins, Boy'z, Isabella Leong	Bronze Award	
2005	The most popular group	Twins	Gold Award	
2005	The most popular commercial song	"Winter Time" (冬令時間)	Bronze Award	
2005	The most popular Chinese song	"Starlight Carnival" (星光遊樂園)	Bronze Award	
2005	Community chest charity award	Twins, Andy Lau	Won	
2006	The top 10 songs	"You Aren't A Good Lover" (你不是好情人)	Won	
2006	The most popular group	Twins	Gold Award	
2006	The most popular Chinese song	"80 Pieces Around The World" (八十塊環遊世界)	Silver Award	
2007	The most popular group	Twins	Gold Award	
2007	Asian Pacific most popular Hong Kong female artist	Twins	Won	

== Metro Radio Mandarin Music Awards ==
Year	Award	Work	Result	Ref.
2010	Best Group	Twins	Won	

== Metro Showbiz Hit Awards ==
The Metro Showbiz Hit Awards (新城勁爆頒獎禮) is held in Hong Kong annually by Metro Showbiz radio station. It focus mostly in cantopop music.

Year	Award	Work	Result	Ref.
2001	Hit New Artist	Twins	Bronze Award	
2002	Hit Songs	Love Bigger Than Sky (戀愛大過天)	Won	
2002	Four Channel Leap Award	Twins	Gold Award	
2002	Hit Group	Twins	Won	
2002	Hit Artist	Twins, Daniel Chan	Won	
2003	Hit Songs	Kite and Wind(風箏與風)	Won	
2003	Hit Album	Touch of Love	Won	
2003	Hit Group	Twins	Won	
2003	Global Hit Dance	Twins	Won	
2004	Hit Songs	Girl Power(女人味)	Won	
2004	Hit Group	Twins	Won	
2004	Hit Group voted by fans	Twins	Won	
2004	Hit Dance Song	(超時空接觸) - Twins, Boy'z, Isabella Leong	Won	
2005	Hit Songs	Life Buoy(救生圈)	Won	
2005	Hit Group	Twins	Won	
2005	Hit Group voted by fans	Twins	Won	
2005	My Most Admired Group	Twins	Won	
2006	Hit Songs	You Aren't a Good Lover	Won	
2006	Hit Group	Twins	Won	
2006	Hit Group in Asia	Twins	Won	
2010	Most Voted for Best Group	Twins	Won	

== RTHK Top 10 Gold Songs Awards ==
The RTHK Top 10 Gold Songs Awards Ceremony(十大中文金曲頒獎音樂會) is held annually in Hong Kong since 1978. The awards are determined by Radio and Television Hong Kong based on the work of all Asian artists (mostly cantopop) for the previous year.

Year	Award	Work	Result	Ref.
2001	Best new female prospect award	Twins	Gold Award	
2002	Top 10 outstanding artists award	Twins	Won	
2002	Sales award for female artists	Twins	Won	
2002	Leap award for female singer	Twins	Silver Award	
2002	National most popular group award	Twins	Silver Award	
2003	The top 10 songs	"Kite and Wind" (風箏與風)	Won	
2003	Sales award for female artists	Twins	Won	
2003	Leap award for female singer	Twins	Silver Award	
2003	National most popular group award	Twins	Gold Award	
2003	Four channel award	Twins	Won	
2004	The top 10 songs	"Drinking Song" (飲歌)	Won	
2004	Outstanding singer award	Twins	Won	
2004	Sales award for female artists	Twins	Won	
2004	National most popular group award	Twins	Gold Award	
2005	Outstanding singer award	Twins	Won	
2005	National most popular group award	Twins	Gold Award	
2006	The top 10 songs	"Kindergarten" (幼稚園)	Won	
2007	Outstanding singer award	Twins	Won	
2007	National most popular group award	Twins	Won	
2007	Sales Award for group	"Sad Love Song" (傷心情歌)	Won	

== Sprite Music Awards ==
The Sprite Music Awards Ceremony is an annual event given by Sprite China for work artists performed in previous years; awards received on 2008 are actually for the work and accomplishment for 2007.

Year	Award	Work	Result	Ref.
2007	Best Group (Hong Kong)	Twins	Won	
