= Twins discography =

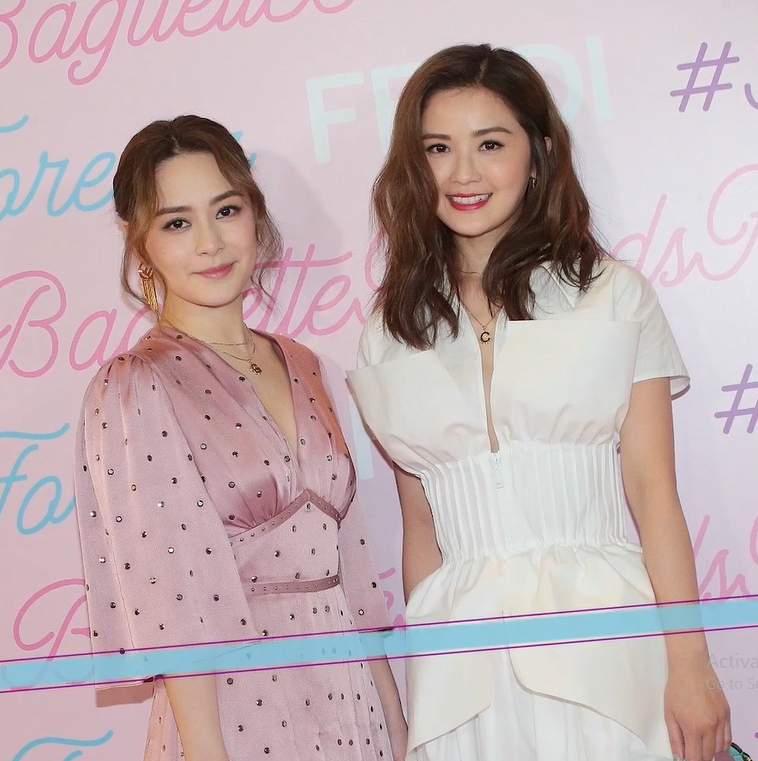
- Twins in 2019
- Studio albums: 15
- Extended plays: 6
- Live albums: 4
- Compilation albums: 4

The discography of Hong Kong pop duo Twins, formed in 2001, consists of fifteen studio albums, six extended plays (EP), five compilation albums, and four live albums. By 2007, the duo had sold over 3.8 million copies of their albums.

== Studio albums ==
=== Cantonese-language albums ===
Title	Album details	Sales	Certifications
Our Souvenir	Released: 30 May 2002; Label: Emperor Entertainment Group; Formats: CD+VCD	HK: 100,000	
Amazing Album	Released: 27 August 2002; Label: Emperor Entertainment Group; Formats: CD+VCD	HK: 50,000	IFPIHK: Platinum
Touch of Love	Released: 28 April 2003; Label: Emperor Entertainment Group; Formats: CD+VCD		
Evolution	Released: 5 September 2003; Label: Emperor Entertainment Group; Formats: CD	HK: 50,000	IFPIHK: Platinum
Magic	Released: 14 January 2004; Label: Emperor Entertainment Group; Formats: CD	HK: 50,000	IFPIHK: Platinum
Girl Power	Released: 25 June 2004; Label: Emperor Entertainment Group; Formats: CD, AVCD		
Samba	Released: 24 June 2005; Label: Emperor Entertainment Group; Formats: CD, AVCD		
The Missing Piece	Released: 23 December 2005; Label: Emperor Entertainment Group; Formats: CD	HK: 100,000	IFPIHK: 2× Platinum
Ho Hoo Tan	Released: 21 September 2006; Label: Emperor Entertainment Group; Formats: CD, DVD		
Twins Party	Released: 16 September 2007; Label: Emperor Entertainment Group; Formats: CD		
2 Be Free	Released: 1 March 2012; Formats: CD, DVD, digital download		

=== Mandarin-language studio albums ===
Title	Album details	Sales
Trainee Cupid	Released: 18 March 2005; Label: Emperor Entertainment Group; Formats: CD	Asia: 800,000
Around the World with 80 Dollars	Released: 2 June 2006; Label: Emperor Entertainment Group; Formats: CD	
Twins Language	Released: 8 January 2008; Label: Emperor Entertainment Group; Formats: CD	
3650	Released: 20 July 2011; Label: Emperor Entertainment Group; Formats: CD, DVD	

== Compilation albums ==
Title	Album details	Certifications
Happy Together	Released: 28 November 2002; Label: Emperor Entertainment Group; Formats: 3CD+DVD	IFPIHK: Platinum
Such a Better Day	Released: 10 December 2004; Label: Emperor Entertainment Group; Formats: CD	
We've Been in Love for 6 Years	Released: 1 February 2007; Label: Emperor Entertainment Group; Formats: 3CD	IFPIHK: Platinum
Everyone Plays	Released: 27 March 2010; Label: Emperor Entertainment Group; Formats: 2CD	

== Extended plays ==
Title	Album details	Sales	Certifications
Twins	Released: 15 August 2001; Label: Emperor Entertainment Group; Formats: CD, AVCD		
Twins' Love	Released: 22 November 2001; Label: Emperor Entertainment Group; Formats: CD, AVCD		
Twins	Released: 29 January 2002; Label: Emperor Entertainment Group; Formats: CD, VCD	HK: 50,000	IFPIHK: Platinum
LOL	Released: 26 November 2015; Label: Emperor Entertainment Group; Formats: CD, digital download		
Flower Appointment	Released: 22 June 2017; Label: Emperor Entertainment Group; Formats: CD, DVD, digital download		
We Are Twins 22	Released: 19 January 2024; Label: Emperor Entertainment Group; Formats: CD, digital download		
