= Singing in the Twins Wonderland (Volume 3) =

Studio album by Twins
- Released: April 2004
- Genre: Children
- Label: Emperor Entertainment Group

Twins chronology
Sei Hei Lam Mun Hei Jing Ceon (2004)	Singing in the Twins Wonderland (Volume 3) (2004)	Girl Power (2004)

Singing in the Twins Wonderland (Volume 3) is an album by Hong Kong girl duo Twins. It is the third album in their series of their children's albums. It was released in April 2004. Whole four albums of "Singing in the Twins Wonderland" had a great success because they became very popular among children. Twins had one more album released for children, named Singing in the Twins Wonderland (Volume 4).

== Background ==
The album was recorded in 2003, along with other first two albums in series. The first, Singing in the Twins Wonderland (Volume 1) is released in November 2003. The second album is released in the same month, and it had also very good success like the first one, but it did not make the same success. Their third album is released on April 3, 2004. It had a good success.

== Track listing ==
1. "The Music Room" – 1:35
2. "I've Got No Strings" – 2:19
3. "Good Morning to All" – 1:19
4. "Did You Ever See a Lassie?" – 1:42
5. "The Library" – 1:28
6. "Cuckoo Clock" – 1:41
7. "Sing a Song" – 1:46
8. "Ding Dong Bell" – 2:09
9. "Hide and Seek" – 1:24
10. "Are You Sleeping?" – 1:24
11. "Can You Tell Me What This Is?" – 1:40
12. "Follow Me" – 1:41
13. "I Have Two Hands" – 1:27
14. "On the Way to School" – 2:00
15. "Donkey Donkey, I Beg You" – 1:25
16. "Boy & Girl" – 1:08
17. "Ten Green Bottles" – 3:17
18. "The Hokey Pokey" – 1:41
19. "Merry-Go-Round" – 0:52
20. "By the Beach" – 1:33
