= List of awards and nominations received by Ron Ng =

This is a list of awards nominated and won by Hong Kong actor and singer, Ron Ng.

== 2004 ==
Award	Category	Work	Result	Ref.
Next Television Award	The Most "Bright Future" Male Actor		Won	
Next Television Award	The Most Outstanding Style New Actor		Won	
The Most Healthy Appearance Award	Top Ten Healthiest Artiste		Won	
The Most Healthy Appearance Award	Armani Active Award		Won	
Guardian’s Number One Most Healthy Award	Charming Award		Won	
TVB Anniversary Awards (2004)	Most Improved Actor	Twin of Brothers	Won	

== 2005 ==
Award	Category	Work	Result	Ref.
Next Television Award'	Top Ten Artiste Number 10		Won	
TVB Weekly Magazine Most Popular Idol Award	Most Popular Idol (Male)		Won	
TVB Weekly Magazine Most Popular Idol Award	Most Popular Ancient Times Character Award (Male)		Won	
Jade Solid Gold Second Round	Newcomer Award	"Don’t Blame Her"	Won	
Yahoo! Most Searched Artistes Award	Yahoo! Most Searched Television Male Artiste		Won	
Metroshowbiz Hit Awards	Hit Awards 2005 Karaoke Song	"Don’t Blame Her"	Won	
2005 Jade Solid Gold Top 10 Awards	The most popular new male artist		Silver Award	

== 2006 ==
Award	Category	Work	Result	Ref.
TVB Anniversary Awards (2006)	Best Actor	Men in Pain	Nominated	
TVB Anniversary Awards (2006)	My Favorite Male Character	Men in Pain	Nominated	
Astro Wah Lai Toi 2005 Television Awards Ceremony (Malaysia)	My Favorite Character Award		Won	
Jade Solid Gold Top 10 Awards	Favorite Newcomer Male Award		Silver Award	
Hits Television Drama Awards	Popular Television Artiste		Won	
Ultimate Song King (GuangZhou)	Most Potential Newcomer (Hong Kong)		Gold Award	
TV Series Themes Awards (Beijing)	Most Potential Artiste in Hong Kong Vicinity		Won	
Lui Ting 881 Who Can Stand Against Me	Beautiful Voice Daddy		Won	
TVB Children’s Songs Award	Ten Best Songs for "Ultimate Battle"		Won	

== 2007 ==
Award	Category	Work	Result	Ref.
TVB Anniversary Awards (2007)	Best Actor	On the First Beat	Nominated	
TVB Anniversary Awards (2007)	My Favorite Male Character	On the First Beat	Nominated	
TVB Anniversary Awards (2007)	Mainland Most Popular TVB Male Artist		Nominated	
Astro Wah Lai Toi 2006 Television Awards Ceremony (Malaysia)	My Favorite Character Award		Won	
Hong Kong’s Future Big-Time Celebrity 2006 (GuangZhou)	Hong Kong Future Big-Time Celebrity		Won	
Hong Kong’s Future Big-Time Celebrity 2006 (GuangZhou)	Most Popular Artiste		Won	
9+2音樂先鋒榜	Best Male Actor-Singer Award		Nominated	
Metro ShowBiz TV Awards	Most Popular Male Actor		Nominated	
Next Magazine TV Awards	Top Ten TV Artistes		Bronze Award	

== 2008 ==
Award	Category	Work	Result	Ref.
TVB Anniversary Awards (2008)	My Favorite Male Character	The Four	Nominated	
TVB Anniversary Awards (2008)	Favourite Actor (in Mainland China)		Nominated	
TVB Anniversary Awards (2008)	TVB Long Term Service and Outstanding Staff Award		Nominated	
Three Weekly	Favourite Character	The Four	Nominated	
Fung Yan Award (China)	"Potential Star"		Nominated	
Fung Yan Award (China)	Favourite Character	The Brink of Law	Nominated	
Singapore Entertainment Awards	My Most Favourite Hong Kong Drama Series Actor		Nominated	
QQ Entertainment Award	Favorite Hong Kong TV Actor		Nominated	
Singapore Entertainment Awards	OMY Web Hottest Celeb		Nominated	
Yahoo Popularity Awards			Nominated	

== 2009 ==
Award	Category	Work	Result	Ref.
TVB Anniversary Awards (2009)	Best Supporting Actor	Rosy Business	Nominated	
TVB Anniversary Awards (2009)	TVB.com Popular Artist		Nominated	
Next Magazine TV Artists Award	Top Ten TV Artistes		Nominated	
China Fashion Carnival	Most Fashionable Artiste		Nominated	
Sohu.com	50 Most Beautiful Person on Earth		Nominated	
HIM Magazine Awards	Cover Award		Nominated	
Children's Song Awards	Top Ten Children's Songs	"Keroro Again"	Nominated	
Esquire Magazine Awards	Most Promising Star		Nominated	
Yahoo! Buzz Award	Most Popular TV Male Artist		Nominated	
