= 2002 RTHK Top 10 Gold Songs Awards =

Hong Kong music awards ceremony

The 2002 RTHK Top 10 Gold Songs Awards (Chinese: 第二十五屆十大中文金曲頒獎音樂會) was held in 2003 for the 2002 music season.

== Top 10 song awards ==
The top 10 songs (十大中文金曲) of 2002 are as follows.

Song name in Chinese	Artist	Composer	Lyricist
天生天養	Andy Lau	Justin Chen	Albert Leung
愛不釋手	Hacken Lee	Chan Fai-young	Albert Leung
有福氣	Kelly Chen	Mark Lui	Chow lai-mau (周禮茂)
好心分手	Candy Lo	Mark Lui	Wyman Wong
明年今日	Eason Chan	Chan siu-ha (陳少霞)	Albert Leung
爭氣	Joey Yung	Chan Fai-young	Albert Leung
傷逝	Sally Yeh	Eric Kwok	Albert Leung
笑中有淚	Miriam Yeung	Yu yat-yiu (于逸堯)	Albert Leung
女人之苦	Andy Hui	Chan Fai-young	Albert Leung
高妹正傳	Gigi Leung	Gigi Leung	Wyman Wong
高妹	Hacken Lee	Gigi Leung	Hacken Lee

== Other awards ==
The top 10 outstanding artist was also extended to 15 artists.

Award	Song or album (if available)	Recipient
Top 10 outstanding artists award (十大優秀流行歌手大獎)	–	Jacky Cheung, Sammi Cheng, Joey Yung, Gigi Leung, Andy Hui, Kelly Chen, Jordan Chan, Miriam Yeung, Candy Lo, Sally Yeh, Eason Chan, Jay Chou, Twins, Hacken Lee, Andy Lau
Best male karaoke song award (最愛歡迎卡拉ok歌曲獎)	惡果	Edwin Siu
Best female karaoke song award (最愛歡迎卡拉ok歌曲獎)	好心分手	Candy Lo
Best group karaoke song award (最愛歡迎卡拉ok歌曲獎)	相愛很難	Jacky Cheung, Anita Mui
Best new male prospect award (最有前途新人獎)	–	(gold) Edwin Siu (silver) Shawn Yue, Anson Hu (bronze) Juno Mak
Best new female prospect award (最有前途新人獎)	–	(gold) Jade Kwan (silver) Chiu Chung-yu (趙頌茹) (bronze) Tiffany Lee (李籠怡)
Best group prospect award (最有前途新人獎)	–	(gold) EO2 (silver) Cookies (bronze) Leong Yik-leon (梁奕倫), Ricky Fan (范振鋒)
Silver blessing award (銀禧至尊新人大獎)	–	Vic Zhou, Vanness Wu, Yumiko Cheng, Shine
CASH international best Chinese song award (CASH全球華語最佳新進作曲人獎)	–	Gigi Leung
CASH international best Chinese lyrics award (CASH全球華語最佳新進作詞人獎)	–	Peggy Hsu
Best original creation song award (最佳原創歌曲獎)	傷逝	Sally Yeh, Eric Kwok, Albert Leung
Best revision song award (最佳改編歌曲獎)	I never told u	Edison Chen, Nuno Bettencourt, Gary F. Cherone, S.Bruinsma, Bear, Hanjin (陳奐仁), Chan zung-wang (陳忠宏)
Outstanding Mandarin song award (優秀國語歌曲獎)	安靜 練習 愛	(gold) Jay Chou, Will Liu (silver) Andy Lau, Lai fai-fai (黎沸輝), Preston Lee (李安修), Wong yu-zung (王裕宗) (bronze) Karen Mok, Chan hiu-yun (陳曉娟), Li coek-hung (李焯雄)
Sales award for male artists (全年最高銷量歌手大獎)	–	Eason Chan, Jay Chou, Hacken Lee
Sales award for female artists (全年最高銷量歌手大獎)	–	Sammi Cheng, Joey Yung, Twins
Leap award for male singer (飛躍大獎)	–	(gold) Jordan Chan (silver) Christopher Wong (黃凱芹) (bronze) Steven Ma
Leap award for female singer (飛躍大獎)	–	(gold) Candy Lo (silver) Twins (bronze) Bobo Chan, Denise Ho
National C-pop song award (全國最受歡迎中文流行歌曲獎)	Angel 練習 My way	(gold) David Tao, Waa waa (娃娃) (silver) Andy Lau, Lai fai-fai (黎沸輝), Li sau-wong (李安修), Wong yu-zung (王裕宗) (bronze) Hins Cheung
National most popular male singer award (全國最受歡迎歌手獎)	–	(gold) Andy Lau (silver) Jay Chou, David Tao (bronze) Sun Nan
National most popular female singer award (全國最受歡迎歌手獎)	–	(gold) Kelly Chen (silver) Stefanie Sun (bronze) Karen Mok
National most popular group award (全國最受歡迎歌手獎)	–	(gold) F4 (silver) Twins (bronze) Yu Quan
International Chinese award (全球華人至尊金曲)	明年今日	Eason Chan, Chan siu-ha (陳少霞), Albert Leung
Four channel award (四台聯頒獎項)	–	Eason Chan, Andy Lau, Mark Lui, Albert Leung
Solid gold honour award (金曲銀禧榮譽大獎)	–	Teresa Teng, Joseph Koo, Nonoy Ocampo (奧金寶), Lau Dong (劉東), Samuel Hui, Tang Ti-sheng, Chan dip-yi (陳碟衣), Wynners, Paula Tsui, Wong Jim, Cheng Kwok Kong (鄭國江), George Lam, Alan Tam, Anita Mui, Leslie Cheung, Jacky Cheung, Roman Tam, Sally Yeh, Beyond, Lou gwok-zim (盧國沾), Andy Lau, Danny Chan, Adam Cheng, Liza Wang, Norman Cheng (鄭東漢)
