= I Have Two Hands =

English nursery rhyme

"I Have Two Hands" is an English-language nursery rhyme from the Philippines.

== Origin ==
An exact year of origin, year of first recording, and song writer for "I Have Two Hands" is unknown. The song and tune in its current form was mentioned as early as 1929 in the magazine Philippine Public Schools. In an article, school administrators stated that the song was widely being taught in elementary schools. It was also mentioned that the song's tune had been previously heard using several different variations. The song was later featured in the 1949 short play Salutation Before the Hour by Reuben Canoy and Francisco Lopez, which related the rhyme's "clean" hands to the importance of voting fairly during elections.

== Lyrics ==
I have two hands, the left and the right.
Hold them up high, so clean and bright.
Clap them softly, 1-2-3.
Clean little hands are good to see.

My face is bright, my teeth all white.
My dress is clean and all of me.
So dear playmates, follow me
So that our mother will be happy!

== In popular culture ==
The 1985 Filipino comedy film I Have Three Hands is titled in reference to the nursery rhyme.

The Hong Kong pop duo Twins covered the rhyme for their 2004 album Singing in the Twins Wonderland (Volume 3).
