= 2003 Jade Solid Gold Awards =

Hong Kong music awards ceremony

The 2003 Jade Solid Gold Best Ten Music Awards Presentation (Chinese: 2003年度十大勁歌金曲頒獎典禮) was held in January 2004. It is part of the Jade Solid Gold Best Ten Music Awards Presentation series held in Hong Kong.

== Corruption incident ==
In 2003 Hong Kong's anti-corruption unit ICAC launched an investigation on TVB as a number of people have been bribing the music industry to win awards. Some of the individuals arrested include Juno Mak, and his father, Clement Mak, who was the chairman of CCT Telecom. Probes were launched after murmurings that TV execs, music company bosses & a singer & his father were involved in backroom dealings that gave music awards not according to merit but on personal connections. Juno was booed by the public when accepting the award. Juno, his father and other industry figures including EEG chairman Albert Yeung were arrested at some stage.

== Top 10 song awards ==
The top 10 songs (十大勁歌金曲) of 2003 are as follows.

Song name in Chinese	Artist
如果有一天	Andy Lau
兩個人的幸運	Gigi Leung
我不會唱歌	Hacken Lee
我的驕傲	Joey Yung
可惜我是水瓶座	Miriam Yeung
她比我醜	Kelly Chen
一步一生	Andy Hui
十面埋伏	Eason Chan
七友	Edmond Leung
下一站天后	Twins

== Additional awards ==
Award	Song (if available for award)	Recipient
The most popular new artist (最受歡迎新人獎)	-	(gold) 2R
-	-	(silver) Deep Ng
-	-	(bronze) Don Li
Most popular online song (最受歡迎網絡金曲獎)	必殺技	(gold) Leo Ku
-	身外情	(silver) Anthony Wong
-	半成年	(bronze) Shine
The most popular commercial song (最受歡迎廣告歌曲大獎)	落地開花	(gold) Candy Lo
-	貪你可愛	(silver) Cookies
-	口袋情人	(bronze) Sky
Most popular mandarin song (最受歡迎國語歌曲獎)	看透	(gold) Karen Mok
-	什麼都不怕	(silver) Miriam Yeung
-	期待	(bronze) Hins Cheung
The best group song (最受歡迎合唱歌曲獎)	特別鳴謝	(gold) Jade Kwan, Edwin Siu
-	好心好報(合唱版)	(silver) Alex Fong, Stephy Tang
-	Kiss Kiss	(gold) EO2, Tiffany Lee (李蘢怡)
Most popular self-composed singer (最受歡迎唱作歌星)	-	(gold) Nicholas Tse
-	-	(silver) Ronald Cheng
-	-	(bronze) Patrick Tang
Outstanding performance award (傑出表現獎)	-	(dual gold) Yumiko Cheng, Jordan Chan
-	-	(bronze) Bobo Chan
Rising star song (新星試打金曲獎)	La La 世界	Boy'z
Most popular adapted song award (最受歡迎改編歌曲演繹大獎)	戒男	Juno Mak, Emme Wong
The best compositions (最佳作曲)	我的驕傲	Joey Yung
The best lyrics (最佳填詞)	失戀王	Wyman Wong, performed by Jordan Chan
The best music arrangement (最佳編曲)	傷逝	Eric Kwok, performed by Sally Yeh
The best song producer (最佳歌曲監製)	安靜	Jay Chou
Community chest charity award (公益金慈善金曲大獎)	有誰共鳴	Andy Lau, Kelly Chen
Four channel award (四台聯頒傳媒大獎)	-	Twins, Joey Yung
Jade solid gold honours award (十大勁歌金曲榮譽大獎)	-	Richard Lam
Asian Pacific most popular Hong Kong male artist (亞太區最受歡迎香港男歌星獎)	-	Andy Lau
Asian Pacific most popular Hong Kong female artist (亞太區最受歡迎香港女歌星獎)	-	Kelly Chen
The most popular male artist (最受歡迎男歌星)	-	Hacken Lee
The most popular female artist (最受歡迎女歌星)	-	Joey Yung
Gold song gold award (金曲金獎)	我的驕傲	Joey Yung

== Notes ==
http://www.inovasisolution.com - solid gold
