= 2011 Jade Solid Gold Awards =

Hong Kong music awards ceremony

The 2011 Jade Solid Gold Best Ten Music Awards Presentation (Chinese: 2011年度十大勁歌金曲頒獎典禮) was held on January 8, 2012. It is part of the Jade Solid Gold Best Ten Music Awards Presentation series.

== Top 10 song awards ==
The top 10 songs (十大勁歌金曲) of 2011 are as follows.

Song name in Chinese	Artist
"華麗舞台"	Grasshopper
"天梯"	C AllStar
"水百合"	Ivana Wong
"Chok"	Raymond Lam
"一再問究竟"	Edmond Leung
"花千樹"	Joey Yung
"爆了"	Leo Ku
"仍然"	Jade Kwan
"戀上外星人"	Julian Cheung
"年年"	Charlene Choi

== Additional awards ==
Award	Song (if available for award)	Recipient
The most popular group (最受歡迎組合獎)	-	(gold) Grasshopper
-	-	(silver) C AllStar
-	-	(bronze) RubberBand
The best newcomer artist (最受歡迎新人獎(男))	-	(gold) Alfred Hui
-	-	(silver) Terry Zou
-	-	(bronze) RedNoon
The best newcomer artist (最受歡迎新人獎(女))	-	(gold) Mag Lam
-	-	(silver) Joyce Cheng
-	-	(bronze) Abella Leung
Outstanding Performance award (傑出表現獎)	-	(gold) Jonathan Wong
-	-	(silver) Wong Cho-lam
-	-	(bronze) Ella Koon
Newcomer impact award (新人薦場飆星獎)	-	Sita Chan
The most popular commercial song (最受歡迎廣告歌曲大獎)	"澎湃"	(gold) Joey Yung
-	"素顏假期"	(silver) HotCha
-	"非凡"	(bronze) Mag Lam
The most popular duet song (最受歡迎合唱歌曲獎)	"勾手指尾"	(gold) Jason Chung & Karene Mak
-	"傻瓜"	(silver) Ken Hung & Sherman Chung
-	"辣著生命"	(bronze) Barry Ip & Det Dik
Best Songwriter singer award (最受歡迎唱作歌星)	-	(gold) Pong Nan
-	-	(silver) Ivana Wong
-	-	(bronze) William Chan
Best Mandarin Song award (最受歡迎華語歌曲獎)	"3650"	(gold): Twins
-	"讓我愛你一小時"	(silver) Raymond Lam
-	"最後情人"	(bronze) Joey Yung
Best Revision Song Award (最受歡迎改編歌曲獎)	"鳥籠"	Mag Lam
The best compositions (最佳作曲)	"Chok"	Tang Chi Wai & Benedict
The best lyrics (最佳填詞)	"花千樹"	Wyman Wong
The best music arrangement (最佳編曲)	"水百合"	Alex Fung
The best song producer (最佳歌曲監製)	"華麗舞台"	Grasshopper & Harris Ho
Asian Pacific most popular Hong Kong male artist (亞太區最受歡迎香港男歌星獎)	-	Raymond Lam
Asian Pacific most popular Hong Kong female artist (亞太區最受歡迎香港女歌星獎)	-	Ivana Wong
The most popular male artist (最受歡迎男歌星)	-	Leo Ku
The most popular female artist (最受歡迎女歌星)	-	Joey Yung
Gold song gold award (金曲金獎)	"Chok"	Raymond Lam
