= Sei Hei Lam Mun Hei Jing Ceon =

Compilation album by Twins
- Released: January 2004
- Genre: Cantopop
- Language: Chinese (Cantonese)
- Label: Emperor Entertainment Group

Twins chronology
| Magic (2004) | Sei Hei Lam Mun Hei Jing Ceon (2004) | Singing in the Twins Wonderland (Volume 3) (2004) |

Sei Hei Lam Mun Hei Jing Ceon
- Traditional Chinese: 四囍臨門喜迎春
Transcriptions
Yue: Cantonese
- Jyutping: sei^{3} hei^{2} lam^{4} mun^{4} hei^{2} jing^{4} ceon^{1}

四囍臨門喜迎春 is the 12th CD released by Twins. It consists of 2 disc. Disc one is an EP, named A Year to Remember, for Boy'z, which has the similar style as Twins and both of them are artists from Emperor Entertainment Group (EEG).

Disc 2 is specially made for the Chinese New Year. The song "(Chinese: 四囍臨門喜迎春; Jyutping: sei^{3} hei^{2} lam^{4} mun^{4} hei^{2} jing^{4} ceon^{1}) is a greeting song for the Chinese New Year, as are "Ma Bao 668" (孖寶668) and "Ni Zui Hong" (你最紅). It also contains some NG videos.

== CD Contents ==
=== Disc 1 ===
1. Computer Data, Not Playable
2. "Chinese: 玻璃少女; Jyutping: bo1 lei4 siu2 neoi5 (Music Video)
3. Chinese: 玻璃少女
4. "Girls"
5. " Chinese: 戀愛最初回; Jyutping: lyun2 ngoi3 zeoi3 co1 wui4 (featured by Kenny Kwan)
6. " Chinese: 少年成熟事件簿; Jyutping: siu2 nin4 sing4 suk6 si6 gin6 bou6
7. " Chinese: 甩繩馬騮; Jyutping: lat1 sing4 maa5 lau4
8. " Chinese: 死性不改; Jyutping: sei2 sing3 bat1 goi2 (featured by Boy'z and Twins)

=== Disc 2 ===
1. Computer Data, Not Playable
2. " Chinese: 四囍臨門喜迎春; Jyutping: sei3 hei2 lam4 mun4 hei2 jing4 ceon1 (Music Video)
3. " Chinese: 四笑嘻哈姻緣; Jyutping: sei3 siu3 hei1 haa1 jan1 jyun4
4. " Chinese: 四福頭新春運大吉; Jyutping: sei3 fuk1 tau4 san1 ceon1 wan6 daai6 gat1
5. " Chinese: 孖仔孖女錫曬您; Jyutping: maa1 zai2 maa1 neoi5 sek3 saai3 nei5
6. " Chinese: 四圈論英雄; Jyutping: sei3 hyun1 leon6 jing1 hung4
7. " Chinese: 四囍臨門喜迎春
