= 2010 Jade Solid Gold Awards =

Hong Kong music awards ceremony

The 2010 Jade Solid Gold Best Ten Music Awards Presentation (Chinese: 2010年度十大勁歌金曲頒獎典禮) was held on January 15, 2011. It is part of the Jade Solid Gold Best Ten Music Awards Presentation series.

== Top 10 song awards ==
The top 10 songs (十大勁歌金曲) of 2010 are as follows.

Song name in Chinese	Artist
"開籠雀"	Ivana Wong
"義海豪情"	Leo Ku
"斗零踭"	Miriam Yeung
"直到你不找我"	Raymond Lam
"金鐘罩"	Andy Hui
"破相"	Joey Yung
"男人信什麼"	Janice Vidal & JW
"K歌之后"	Stephanie Cheng
"愛的習慣"	Justin Lo
"放得低"	Charlene Choi

== Additional awards ==
Award	Song (if available for award)	Recipient
The most popular group (最受歡迎組合獎)	-	(gold) RubberBand
-	-	(silver) HotCha
-	-	(bronze) Benji & Lesley
The best newcomer artist (最受歡迎新人獎)	-	(gold) JW
-	-	(silver) Khloe Chu
-	-	(bronze) Jinny Ng
Outstanding Performance award (傑出表現獎)	-	(gold) William Chan
-	-	(silver) G.E.M.
-	-	(bronze) The Voice singers
Newcomer impact award (新人薦場飆星獎)	-	Alfred Hui
The most popular commercial song (最受歡迎廣告歌曲大獎)	"綠野仙踪"	Joey Yung
The most popular duet song (最受歡迎合唱歌曲獎)	"初見"	(gold) Miriam Yeung, Raymond Lam
-	"一直都在"	(silver) Charlene Choi & Raymond Lam
-	"愛得起"	(bronze) Stephanie Cheng & Linda Chung
Best Songwriter singer award (最受歡迎唱作歌星)	-	(gold) Hanjin Tan & MC Jin
-	-	(silver) Louis Cheung
-	-	(bronze) Jonathan Wong
Best Mandarin Song award (最受歡迎華語歌曲獎)	"信今生愛過"	(gold) Joey Yung
-	"以前、以後"	(silver) Raymond Lam
-	"我最愛糖"	(bronze) Sugar Club
Best Revision Song Award (最受歡迎改編歌曲獎)	"重新出發"	Jade Kwan
The best compositions (最佳作曲)	"男人信什麼"	Hanjin Tan
The best lyrics (最佳填詞)	"義海豪情"	Chan Sze Wai
The best music arrangement (最佳編曲)	"周星呢"	Leung Chi Yum
The best song producer (最佳歌曲監製)	"無限大"	Mark Lui
Asian Pacific most popular Hong Kong male artist (亞太區最受歡迎香港男歌星獎)	-	Raymond Lam
Asian Pacific most popular Hong Kong female artist (亞太區最受歡迎香港女歌星獎)	-	Miriam Yeung
The most popular male artist (最受歡迎男歌星)	-	Leo Ku
The most popular female artist (最受歡迎女歌星)	-	Joey Yung
Gold song gold award (金曲金獎)	"男人信什麼"	Janice Vidal & JW
