= Happy Together (Twins album) =

Greatest hits album by Twins
- Released: November 2002
- Genre: Cantopop
- Label: Emperor Entertainment Group

Twins chronology
Amazing Album (2002)	Happy Together (2002)	Touch of Love (2003)

Happy Together is the first greatest hits album released by Twins. It was first released in November 2002 and consisted of 3 CDs (4 new songs and 20 selection hits) and 1 VCD, along with 10 different covers.

A second version of this album was released in 2003. This version consisted of 2 CDs and 1 VCD, and was similar to the first version. However, since the Chinese New Year was coming, a celebration song, "Ni Zui Hong" (你最紅), was included in the album. The star, Leslie Cheung, took part in the song's music video. Some collectible New Year gifts such as Twins x Marie Red Packets, Jelly Belly candy with creative menu, poster, four different "Fai Chun" and coupons were also included in this edition.

There is a third version of this greatest hits with added new music videos and 2 brand-new covers released later, and it breaks their album record which have total 13 covers for an album to date.

== CD Content ==
=== First Version ===
Disc 1

1. "Feng Zheng Yu Feng" (風箏與風) (the theme song of the advertisement for Matsunichi )
2. "Bai Shi Bu Yan" (百試不厭) (the theme song of Marie's 2003)
3. "'Ming Ai An Lian Bu Xi She" (明愛暗戀補習社) (Assembly Mix)
4. "Nu Xiao Nan Sheng" (女校男生)
5. "Xue Sheng Shou Ce" (學生手冊)
6. "Huan Ji" (換季)
7. "Wo Men Di Ji Nian Ce" (我們的紀念冊)
8. "Feng Zheng Yu Feng" (風箏與風) Remix (Lost And Found Version)

Disc 2

1. "No.1"
2. "Ai Qing Dang Ru Xun" (愛情當入樽)
3. "Er Ren Shi Jie Bei" (二人世界盃)
4. "ICHIBAN Xing Fen" (ICHIBAN興奮)
5. "Ni Shi Wo De UFO" (你是我的UFO)
6. "Da Hong Da Zi" (大紅大紫)
7. "Guo Shou Kan Zhao" (高手看招)

Disc 3

1. "Xing Xing Yue Liang Tai Yang" (星星月亮太陽) (the theme song of Shunde Jiaxin Citi Plaza Cardinal Heights advertisement)
2. "Yan Hong Hong - Hou Zhuan" (眼紅紅 - 後傳) (Narrator：Dicky Cheung)
3. "Lian Ai Da Guo Tian" (戀愛大過天)
4. "Peng You Zi" (朋友仔)
5. "Li Wo Qian Xiao" (梨渦淺笑)
6. "Fa Meng Jian Guo Ni" (發夢見過你)
7. "Ren Bi Ren" (人比人)
8. "Kuai Shu Shi Dai" (快熟時代)
9. "Da Lang Man Zhu Yi" (大浪漫主義)

Disc 4 (VCD)

1. "Feng Zheng Yu Feng" (風箏與風) (the theme song of Matsunichi advertisement) Music Video
2. "Twins Ichiban Amazing Show" (Twins Ichiban興奮演唱會) production highlights
3. Twins 2002 advertisement: Shunde Jiaxin
4. Twins 2002 advertisement: G.Sushi
5. Twins 2002 advertisement: Nissin Cup Noodle
6. Twins 2002 advertisement: New World Telecom
7. Twins 2002 advertisement: Gulong Online
8. Twins 2002 advertisement: Clean & Clear
9. Twins 2002 advertisement: Saint Honore

=== Second Version ===
Disc 1

1. "Ni Zui Hong" (你最紅) (New song)
2. "Feng Zheng Yu Feng" (風箏與風) (the theme song Matsunichi advertisement)
3. "Xing Xing Yue Liang Tai Yang" (星星月亮太陽) (the theme song of Shunde Jiaxin Citi Plaza Cardinal Heights)
4. "No.1"
5. "Bai Shi Bu Yan" (百試不厭) (the theme song of Marie's 2003)
6. "Feng Zheng Yu Feng" (風箏與風) Remix (Lost And Found Version)
7. "Ming Ai An Lain Bu Xi She" (明愛暗戀補習社) (Assembly Mix)
8. "Nu Xiao Nan Sheng" (女校男生)
9. "Xue Sheng Shou Ce" (學生手冊)
10. "Huan Ji" (換季)
11. "Wo Men Di Ji Nian Ce" (我們的紀念冊)
12. "Ai Qing Dang Ru Xun" (愛情當入樽)

Disc 2

1. "Er Ren Shi Jie Bei" (二人世界盃)
2. "ICHIBAN Xing Fen" (ICHIBAN興奮)
3. "Ni Shi Wo De UFO" (你是我的UFO)
4. "Da Hong Da Zi" (大紅大紫)
5. "Guo Shou Kan Zhao" (高手看招)
6. "Yan Hong Hong - Hou Zhuan" (眼紅紅 - 後傳) (Narrator：Dicky Chueng)
7. "Lian Ai Da Guo Tian" (戀愛大過天)
8. "Peng YOu Zi" (朋友仔)
9. "Li Wo Qian Xiao" (梨渦淺笑)
10. "Fa Meng Jian Guo Ni" (發夢見過你)
11. "Ren Bi Ren" (人比人)
12. "Kuai Shu Shi Dai" (快熟時代)
13. "Da Lang Man Zhu Yi" (大浪漫主義)

Disc 3 (VCD)

1. Ni Zui Hong (你最紅) (Special Guest: Leslie Cheung) (music video)
2. "Feng Zheng Yu Feng" (風箏與風) (the theme song of Matsunichi advertisement) music video
3. "Xing Xing Yue Liang Tai Yang" (星星月亮太陽) (music video)
4. "Bai Shi Bu Yan" (百試不厭) (music video)
5. "Twins Ichiban Amazing Show" (Twins Ichiban興奮演唱會) production highlights
6. Twins 2002 advertisement: Shunde Jiaxin
7. Twins 2002 advertisement: G.Sushi
8. Twins 2002 advertisement: Nissin Cup Noodle
9. Twins 2002 advertisement: New World Telecom Twins Mobile
10. Twins 2002 advertisement: Gulong Online
11. Twins 2002 advertisement: Clean & Clear
12. Twins 2002 advertisement: Saint Honore
