= Singing in the Twins Wonderland (Volume 2) =

Studio album by Twins
- Released: November 2003
- Label: Emperor Entertainment Group

Twins chronology
| Singing in the Twins Wonderland (Volume 1) (2003) | Singing in the Twins Wonderland (Volume 2) (2003) | Magic (2004) |

Singing in the Twins Wonderland (Volume 2) is an album by Twins. Since the previous album Singing in the Twins Wonderland (Volume 1) was a great success, another similar album, Singing in the Twins Wonderland (Volume 2), was released in the same month. It also contains 20 English songs and 3 stories.

== Track listing ==
1. "Baa Baa Black Sheep"
2. "Bingo"
3. "Colour Song"
4. "Twinkle Twinkle Little Star"
5. "Old MacDonald Had a Farm"
6. "Finger Song"
7. "Two Little Eyes"
8. "Auld Lang Syne"
9. "Row, Row, Row Your Boat"
10. "Do Re Mi"
11. "I Saw Three Ships"
12. "Oh! Suzanna"
13. "Silent Night"
14. "The Morning Song"
15. "Head and Shoulder Knees and Toes"
16. "Hush Little Baby"
17. "Looby Loo"
18. "Little Bird"
19. "ABC"
20. "Hickory Dickory Dock"
21. "葡萄園的農夫" (Story 1)
22. "得意忘形的蚊子" (Story 2)
23. "背鹽的驢子" (Story 3)

Source: YesAsia
