= Everyone Bounce =

Greatest hits album by Twins
- Released: March 2010
- Recorded: 2001–2010
- Genre: Cantopop
- Label: Emperor Entertainment Group

Twins chronology
| Twins Language (2008) | Everyone Bounce (2010) | 3650 (2011) |

Everyone Bounce is the fifth greatest hits album by Hong Kong cantopop girl duo Twins. It consists of 32 songs on two CDs. The first CD has 16 tracks including the new song, "Everyone Bounces Up". The second disc contains the new song "Growth". It was released in March 2010 along with Gillian's debut EP Gillian.

== Background ==
Twins break up in March, 2008, because of Edison Chen photo scandal involving Gillian Chung. In July 2008, Charlene Choi said that she was optimistic and that she got to handle the media. Later, Chung apologized to Choi because of a lot of things that happened. Twins get together again in early 2010, when they do the small performance in luxury hotel The Venetian Macao on February 27. On March 3, Choi and Chung (Twins) appeared in purple Porche in public. Later, they recorded two new songs for their new album. The compilation was released on March 30, 2010, in a package with Gillian's debut release.

== Track listing ==
CD 1

1. "Everyone Bounces Up"
2. "Yan Hong Hong" (眼红红)
3. "Feng Zheng Yu Feng" (风筝与风)
4. "Lian Ai Da Guo Tian" (恋爱大过天)
5. "Yin Ge" (饮歌)
6. "Xia Yi Zhan Tian Hou" (下一站天后)
7. "Ai Qing Dang Ru Zun" (爱情当入樽)
8. "Qian Jin" (千金)
9. "Shuang Shi Qing Ren Jie" (双失情人节)
10. "Nu Ren Wei" (女人味 )
11. "Jiu Sheng Juan" (救生圈)
12. "Nu Jiao Nan Sheng" (女校男生)
13. "ICHIBAN Xing Fen" (ICHIBAN兴奋)
14. "Open Love, Secret Love, Tutoring Institute"
15. "Ding Ling Shi Jian" (冬令时间)
16. "Jian Xi Ai Shen" (见习爱神)

CD 2

1. "Growth"
2. "Wo Men Di Ji Nian Ce" (我们的纪念册)
3. "Re Lang Jia Qi" (热浪假期 )
4. "Yi Shi Wu Liang" (一时无两)
5. "Da Lang Man Zhu Yi" (大浪漫主义)
6. "Duo Xie Shi Lian" (多谢失恋)
7. "Ling 4 Hao Wan" (零4好玩)
8. "Luan Shi Jia Ren" (乱世佳人)
9. "Hei Se Xi Ju" (黑色喜剧)
10. "I Bu Shi Hao Qing Ren" (你不是好情人)
11. "Shi Duo Pi Li Ping Guo Cheng" (士多啤梨苹果橙)
12. "Xia Ri Kuang Hua" ( 夏日狂哗)
13. "Sen Ba Huang Hou" (森巴皇后)
14. "Da Hong Da Zi" (大红大紫)
15. "Jing Xuan" (精选)
16. "Diu Jia" (丢架)

== Gillian EP ==
Gillian

EP by Gillian Chung
- Released: March 2010
- Recorded: 2009–2010
- Genre: Cantopop
- Label: Emperor Entertainment Group

Gillian Chung chronology
| Gillian (2010) | Move On... (2010) |

Gillian is the self-titled debut EP by Hong Kong singer and one part of the duo Twins, Gillian Chung. It was released on March 30, 2010, in a package along with Twins' compilation, Everyone Bounce. It is her first solo project ever and was released after the reunion of Twins.

=== Track listing ===
==== Cantonese version ====
1. "A Heart Too Many" (featuring MC Jin)
2. "What Is in Style"
3. "Life Elsewhere"
4. "Start from Tin Hau Station"
5. "Orange Road"
6. "Right on the Scene"

==== Mandarin version ====
1. "Capricious"
2. "What Is the Trend" (featuring William Chun)
3. "Life Elsewhere"
4. "Tin Hau Station" (Edit)
5. "Orange Road"
6. "Right on the Scene" (Mandarin Version featuring William Chun)
