= I Have Three Hands =

- Official movie poster
- Directed by: Luciano B. Carlos
- Screenplay by: Jose Javier Reyes; Luciano B. Carlos
- Story by: Jose Javier Reyes
- Produced by: Lily Y. Monteverde
- Starring: Tito Sotto; Vic Sotto; Joey de Leon; Maricel Soriano; Sheryl Cruz; Manilyn Reynes; Chuckie Dreyfuss; Kristina Paner
- Cinematography: Gener Buenaseda
- Edited by: Efren Jarlego
- Music by: Tito Sotto; Homer Flores
- Production company: Regal Films
- Distributed by: Regal Films
- Release date: September 12, 1985
- Country: Philippines
- Language: Filipino

I Have Three Hands is a 1985 Filipino comedy film directed by Luciano B. Carlos, written by Carlos and Jose Javier Reyes, and starring the comedy trio of Tito Sotto, Vic Sotto, and Joey de Leon, as well as Maricel Soriano, Sheryl Cruz, Manilyn Reynes, Chuckie Dreyfuss, and Kristina Paner. The film's title is a play on the nursery rhyme "I Have Two Hands".

== Plot ==
Bitoy, Atoy and Caloy (Tito, Vic and Joey respectively) are 3 hapless brothers who got employed by a rich couple to take care of their children who turned out to be spoiled brats who have successfully driven out all their nannies from their house through their improvised booby traps. But the brothers stuck through with the children until the end. In the midst of all the mess comes Bridget (Maricel Soriano) who is their next-door neighbor's maid. She becomes the Agatep brothers' object of affection, but unknown to them she also brings trouble.

== Cast ==
Main cast

- Tito Sotto as Jovito "Bitoy" Agatep
- Vic Sotto as Fortunato "Atoy" Agatep
- Joey de Leon as Carlos "Caloy" Agatep
- Maricel Soriano as Bridget

Supporting cast

- Sheryl Cruz
- Manilyn Reynes
- Chuckie Dreyfuss
- Kristina Paner
- Debraliz
- Dely Atay-Atayan
- Subas Herrero as Don Severino
- Amado Pineda
- Tani Cinco
- Evelyn Vargas
- Flora Gasser
- Anna Feliciano
- Rey Solo
- Aurora Yumul
- Jay Imperial
- Perry de Guzman
- Alex Toledo
- Arnel Bilaro
- Jimmy Tongco
- George Gyness

=== Music ===
Tito Sotto and Homer Flores composed the musical score of I Have Three Hands. An instrumental version of "We Are the World" is played throughout the film, and by the end, a parody song titled "Maid in the Philippines" is performed by the characters in a similar way to the USA for Africa music video.

== Home media ==
I Have Three Hands was released on DVD by Regal Capital in 2009 paired with another film also starring the comedy trio, Shoot That Ball.

The entire film was made available on YouTube for streaming without charge by Regal Entertainment on September 4, 2019.
