= Singing in the Twins Wonderland (Volume 4) =

Studio album by Twins
- Released: August 2004
- Genre: Cantopop
- Label: Emperor Entertainment Group

Twins chronology
Girl Power (2004)	Singing in the Twins Wonderland (Volume 4) (2004)	Such a Better Day (2004)

Singing in the Twins Wonderland (Volume 4) is an album by the Hong Kong Cantopop duo Twins. It is the fourth in their series of children's albums, and was released in August 2004.

== Track listing ==
1. "Three Blind Mice"
2. "Fishes, Fishes Where are You?"
3. "Starry Skies"
4. "The More We Get Together"
5. "Friends"
6. "How Much"
7. "The Three Little Kittens"
8. "I Have Got Six Pence"
9. "How Do You Do?"
10. "Ring a Ring of Roses"
11. "Froggie Froggie"
12. "Our School Will Shine"
13. "I Had a Little Nut Tree"
14. "Table and Chair"
15. "To the Circus"
16. "When I was a Young Girl"
17. "The Train"
18. "Everybody Jump"
19. "Sunny Day"
20. "Goodbye to You"

Source: YesAsia
