= 1983 Jade Solid Gold Best Ten Music Awards Presentation =

Hong Kong music awards ceremony

The 1983 Jade Solid Gold Best Ten Music Awards Presentation (Chinese: 1983年度十大勁歌金曲頒獎典禮) was held in January 1984. It was the first Jade Solid Gold Best Ten Music Awards Presentation ever held in Hong Kong.

== Top 10 song awards ==
The top 10 songs (十大勁歌金曲) of 1983 are as follows.

Song name in Chinese	Artist(s)
今宵多珍重	Danny Chan
漁舟唱晚	Michael Kwan
倦	Deanie Ip
願你繼續醉	Agnes Chan
激光中	Roman Tam
一段情	Kenny Bee
赤的疑惑	Anita Mui
交出我的心	Anita Mui
遲來的春天	Alan Tam
常在我心間	Michael Kwan, Tracy Huang

== Additional awards ==
Award	Song name	Recipient(s)
The Seasonal Vote Award (勁歌金曲季選最受歡迎獎)	常在我心間	Michael Kwan, Tracy Huang
The Most Popular Composer Lyricist Award (作曲作詞人最受歡迎獎)	一段情	Composer: Lu Yongqiang; Performed by: Kenny Bee
AGB Survey Audience The Most Popular Song Award (AGB觀眾抽樣調查最受歡迎獎)	今宵多珍重	Danny Chan
