= 2006 Jade Solid Gold Awards =

Hong Kong music awards

The 2006 Jade Solid Gold Best Ten Music Awards Presentation (Chinese: 2006年度十大勁歌金曲頒獎典禮) was held in January 2007. It is part of the Jade Solid Gold Best Ten Music Awards Presentation series held at the Hong Kong Coliseum.

== Top 10 song awards ==
The top 10 songs (十大勁歌金曲) of 2006 are as follows.

Song name in Chinese	Artist
紅綠燈	Stephanie Cheng
最佳損友	Eason Chan
愛得太遲	Leo Ku
張開眼睛	Andy Lau
天水‧圍城	Hacken Lee
情歌	Justin Lo
華麗邂逅	Joey Yung
離家出走	Janice Vidal
光明會	Denise Ho
你不是好情人	Twins

== Additional awards ==
Award	Song (if available for award)	Recipient
The most popular group (最受歡迎組合獎)	-	(gold) Twins
-	-	(silver) at17
-	-	(bronze) EO2
The most popular new artist (最受歡迎新人獎)	-	(gold) Vincy Chan
-	-	(silver) Kelvin Kwan
-	-	(bronze) Jill Vidal
New field award (新人薦場飆星獎)	-	Bernice Liu
The most popular commercial song (最受歡迎廣告歌曲大獎)	張開眼睛	(gold) Andy Lau
-	愛得太遲	(silver) Leo Ku
-	赤地雪	(bronze) Joey Yung
The most popular Chinese song (最受歡迎華語歌曲獎)	Hurt So Bad	(gold) Hins Cheung
-	八十塊環遊世界	(silver) Twins
-	愛情復興	(bronze) Joey Yung
The best duet song (最受歡迎合唱歌曲獎)	十分‧愛	(gold) Alex Fong, Stephy Tang
-	愛與被愛	Vincent Wong, Hailie Leung (梁晴晴)
-	滄海遺珠	Wilfred Lau, Kay Tse
Most popular self-composed singer (最受歡迎唱作歌星)	-	(gold) Andy Lau
-	-	(silver) Hins Cheung
-	-	(bronze) Justin Lo
Outstanding performance award (傑出表現獎)	-	(gold) Justin Lo
-	-	(silver) Janice Vidal
-	-	(bronze) Hins Cheung
The best compositions (最佳作曲)	愛得太遲	Yeung zan-bong (楊鎮邦)
The best lyrics (最佳填詞)	愛得太遲	Albert Leung
The best music arrangement (最佳編曲)	張開眼睛	Andrew Tuason
The best song producer (最佳歌曲監製)	愛得太遲	Mark Lui
Four channel award (四台聯頒音樂大獎)	-	(gold) Janice Vidal
-	-	(silver) Justin Lo
-	-	(bronze) Fiona Sit
Asian Pacific most popular Hong Kong male artist (亞太區最受歡迎香港男歌星獎)	-	Andy Lau
Asian Pacific most popular Hong Kong female artist (亞太區最受歡迎香港女歌星獎)	-	Kelly Chen
The most popular male artist (最受歡迎男歌星)	-	Eason Chan
The most popular female artist (最受歡迎女歌星)	-	Joey Yung
25th anniversary song honor (勁歌金曲25週年榮譽金曲獎)	愛情陷阱	Alan Tam
Gold song gold award (金曲金獎)	愛得太遲	Leo Ku
