= Singing in the Twins Wonderland (Volume 1) =

Studio album by Twins
- Released: November 2003
- Label: Emperor Entertainment Group

Twins chronology
Evolution (2003)	Singing in the Twins Wonderland (Volume 1) (2003)	Singing in the Twins Wonderland (Volume 2) (2003)

Singing in the Twins Wonderland (Volume 1) is the 9th CD by the Twins and was released in November 2003. Since Twins became very popular among children, this CD was made particularly for small children. It contains 20 English songs and three stories.

== Track listing ==
1. "If You Are Happy"
2. "Mary Had A Little Lamb"
3. "My Bonnie"
4. "Happy Birthday"
5. "Hello, How Do You Do"
6. "Long Long Ago"
7. "Jingle Bells"
8. "The Farmer in the Dell"
9. "Ten Little Indian Boys"
10. "The Muffin Man"
11. "A for Apple B for Boy"
12. "Five Little Ducks"
13. "I Went to School One Morning"
14. "This Old Man"
15. "Red River Valley"
16. "Skip to My Lou"
17. "The Mulberry Bush"
18. "This Is the Way"
19. "You're My Sunshine"
20. "London Bridge Is Falling Down"
21. "Zi Qu Qi Ru De Wu Ya" (自取其辱的烏鴉) (Story 1)
22. "Lao Ying Bao En" (老鷹報恩) (Story 2)
23. "Lu Xing Zhe Yu Xiong" (旅行者與熊) (Story 3)
