= Jade Solid Gold Awards =

Hong Kong music awards

The top-10 logo

The Jade Solid Gold Awards (Chinese: 勁歌金曲頒獎典禮; Jyutping: ging3 go1 gam1 kuk1 baan1 zoeng2 din2 lai5; also known as J.S.G. Awards Presentation) is one of the main C-pop music award in Hong Kong based on the Jade Solid Gold TVB television show. The award began with the 1984 ceremonial season after the 1983 music season. Historically the ceremony is held in January following the end of the previous music season at the Hong Kong Coliseum located in Hung Hom. The show is televised on TVB station annually, and has remained to be one of the headline topics for entertainment news in the region. The other notable award is the RTHK Top 10 Gold Songs Awards.

== Award format ==
The top 10 songs of the year is the key award given out, hence the name of the award. Each year there are a number of standard awards such as "most popular male artist", "most popular female artist". Occasionally new awards are added or awards are changed.

=== 1980s awards ===
1983, 1984, 1985, 1986, 1987, 1988, 1989

=== 1990s awards ===
1990, 1991, 1992, 1993, 1994, 1995, 1996, 1997, 1998, 1999

=== 2000s awards ===
2000, 2001, 2002, 2003, 2004, 2005, 2006, 2007, 2008, 2009

=== 2010s awards ===
2010, 2011, 2012, 2013, 2014, 2015, 2016, 2017, 2018, 2019

=== 2020s awards ===
2020

== Summary ==
=== Hosts ===
Year	Host
1983, 1984	Ivan Ho & Winnie Yu
1985, 1986	Winnie Yu
1987	Lawrence Cheng
1988	Lawrence Cheng & Philip Chan
1989	Lawrence Cheng & Money Lo
1990, 1991	Lawrence Cheng
1992, 1993	Carol Cheng & Lawrence Cheng
1994	Lawrence Cheng
1995	Lawrence Cheng & Anita Yuen
1996	Lawrence Cheng & Dicky Cheung
1997	Lawrence Cheng
1998	Eric Tsang & Louis Yuen
1999	Eric Tsang & Dicky Cheung
2000	Eric Tsang, Jerry Lamb & Nicola Cheung
2001	Eric Tsang, Jerry Lamb & Bondy Chiu
2002	Eric Tsang, Jerry Lamb & Nadia Chan
2003	Natalis Chan, Vincent Kok & Jerry Lamb
2004	Lawrence Cheng, Ronald Cheng & Denise Ho
2005, 2006	Eric Tsang & Amigo Choi
2007	Eric Tsang, Amigo Choi & Harlem Yu
2008	Eric Tsang & Amigo Choi
2009	Eric Tsang, Wong Cho Lam & Patrick Tang
2010	Louis Yuen, Wong Cho Lam & Johnson Lee
2011	Eric Tsang, Amigo Choi & Christine Ng
2012	Eric Tsang, Amigo Choi & Luisa Maria Leitao
2013	Carol Cheng, Lawrence Cheng & Amigo Choi
2014	Carol Cheng, Amigo Choi and Bob Lam
2015	Carol Cheng, Lawrence Cheng & Amigo Choi
2016	Amigo Choi & Fama: 6-Wing & C-Kwan
2017	Luk Ho Ming, Louisa Mak & Crystal Fung
2018	Mayanne Mak, Edmond Hui & Albert Au
2019	Luk Ho Ming, Edmond Hui & Albert Au
2020	Luk Ho Ming, Edmond Hui & Albert Au

=== Asia Pacific Most Popular Artist Great Awards ===
The Asia Pacific Most Popular Artist Great Awards is one of the main awards given out in the ceremony. It does not pertain to a particular song.

Year	Asia Pacific Most Popular Male Singer (亞太區最受歡迎男歌星)	Asia Pacific Most Popular Female Singer (亞太區最受歡迎女歌星)
1993	Andy Lau	Faye Wong
1994	Jacky Cheung	Faye Wong
1995, 1996	Andy Lau	Faye Wong
1997	Jacky Cheung	Faye Wong
1998	Jacky Cheung	A-mei Cheung
1999	Aaron Kwok	Faye Wong
2000	Andy Lau	Faye Wong
2001–2006	Andy Lau	Kelly Chen
2007	Eason Chan	Twins
2008	Eason Chan	Joey Yung
2009	Raymond Lam	Joey Yung
2010	Raymond Lam	Miriam Yeung
2011	Raymond Lam	Ivana Wong
2012	Lollipop F	Twins
2013	Hins Cheung	Jade Kwun
2014	Justin Lo	Jade Kwun
2015	Alfred Hui Jason Chan	Vincy Chan
2016	Alfred Hui	Vincy Chan
2017	Hubert Wu	Hana Kuk
2018	Hubert Wu	Jinny Ng
2019	Pak Ho Chau	Hana Kuk

Note: In 1993, TVB created a new great award called Mainland's Most Popular Hong Kong Singer Great Award (國內最受歡迎香港歌星大獎). Which is essentially the first incarnation of Asia Pacific Most Popular Hong Kong Singer Great Award (亞太區最受歡迎香港歌星大獎). The scope of the great award was increased from Mainland China to the Asia Pacific region in 1994 to now.

==== Most winners ====
In the Asia Pacific Most Popular Artist Great Awards, Andy Lau and Faye Wong had won more awards in the category with 10 and 7 awards, respectively. Andy Lau had the longest consecutive wins by a male artist from 2000 to 2006, while Kelly Chen had the longest consecutive wins by a female from 2001 to 2006, numbering 6 awards.

=== Most Popular Artist Great Awards ===
The Most Popular artist Great awards is one of the main awards given out in the ceremony. It does not pertain to a particular song.

Year	Most Popular Male Singer (最受歡迎男歌星)	Most Popular Female Singer (最受歡迎女歌星)
1984	Alan Tam	Jenny Tseng
1985–1987	Alan Tam	Anita Mui
1988, 1989	Leslie Cheung	Anita Mui
1990–1992	Andy Lau	Sally Yeh
1993	Leon Lai	Sally Yeh
1994	Andy Lau	Faye Wong
1995	Leon Lai	Cass Phang
1996	Jacky Cheung	Sammi Cheng
1997	Aaron Kwok	Sammi Cheng
1998	Aaron Kwok	Faye Wong
1999	Andy Lau	Kelly Chen
2000	Aaron Kwok	Kelly Chen
2001	Andy Hui	Sammi Cheng
2002	Hacken Lee	Miriam Yeung
2003	Hacken Lee	Joey Yung
2004	Andy Lau	Joey Yung
2005	Hacken Lee	Joey Yung
2006, 2007	Eason Chan	Joey Yung
2008, 2009	Leo Ku	Miriam Yeung
2010, 2011	Leo Ku	Joey Yung
2012, 2013	Raymond Lam	Joey Yung
2014	Hins Cheung	Joey Yung
2015	Hins Cheung	Joey Yung
2016	Hins Cheung	Joey Yung
2017	Hacken Lee	– Not awarded in 2017 –
2018	Hins Cheung	Hana Kuk
2019	Pakho Chau	Hana Kuk

==== Most winners ====
Within the Most Popular Artist Great Awards category, Andy Lau had the most wins by a male artist, with six, including three consecutive years from 1990 to 1992. However, Leo Ku tied for having the longest series consecutive records, with five wins from 2008 to 2012. For the female artists, Joey Yung had the most wins with twelve categories, including longest six consecutive records from 2003 to 2007, 2010 to 2016.

==== Other events ====
Annual 2014, Joey Yung tenth times achieved Most Popular Female Artist Great Awards, furthermore achieved 「Most Popular Artist Ten Years Great Awards」.

Annual 2015, Hins Cheung become to Hong Kong Macau Music Emperor; Joey Yung become to Central Music Empress.

=== Gold Song Gold Awards ===
In addition to the top 10 tracks awarded each year, the following Gold Song Gold Awards (金曲金獎) is given to the best song of the year.

Year	Song name in Chinese	Artist
1984	愛在深秋	Alan Tam
1985	愛情陷阱	Alan Tam
1986	有誰共鳴	Leslie Cheung
1987	無心睡眠	Leslie Cheung
1988	祝福	Sally Yeh
1989	夕陽之歌	Anita Mui
1990	焚心以火	Sally Yeh
1991	每天愛你多一些	Jacky Cheung
1992	分手總要在雨天	Jacky Cheung
1993	祇想一生跟你走	Jacky Cheung
1994	那有一天不想你	Leon Lai
1995	離開以後	Jacky Cheung
1996	情深說話未曾講	Leon Lai
1997	只要為我愛一天	Leon Lai
1998	我這樣愛你	Leon Lai
1999	插曲	Sammi Cheng
2000	少女的祈禱	Miriam Yeung
2001	Shall We Talk	Eason Chan
2002	明年今日	Eason Chan
2003	我的驕傲	Joey Yung
2004	小城大事	Miriam Yeung
2005	無賴	Ronald Cheng
2006	愛得太遲	Leo Ku
2007	花落誰家	Hacken Lee
2008	囍帖街	Kay Tse
2009	搜神記	Joey Yung
2010	男人信什麼	Janice Vidal & JW
2011	Chok	Raymond Lam
2012	留白	Ivana Wong
2013	天窗	Joey Yung
2014	越難越愛	Jinny Ng
2015	眼淚的秘密	Jinny Ng
2016	一個都不能少	Hacken Lee
2017	失魂記	Hacken Lee
2018	百年樹木	Hins Cheung
2019	让愛高飞	Pakho Chau
2020	呼吸有害	Karen Mok

Note: In 2010, 男人信什麼 broke the record as being the first duet song to win this title. Further, JW is the first artist to win this award in their debut year as artist.

== See also ==
- RTHK Top 10 Gold Songs Awards
- New Talent Singing Awards
- List of Hong Kong music awards
