= 2007 Jade Solid Gold Awards =

Hong Kong music awards ceremony

The Jade Solid Gold Best Ten Music Awards Presentation was held at the Hong Kong Coliseum.

A mistake was made by the hosts of the show in announcing the award for Hins Cheung, which was incorrectly given to Ivana Wong. They agreed to share the prizes.

== Top 10 song awards ==
The top 10 songs (十大勁歌金曲) of 2007 are as follows.

Song name in Chinese	Artist
酷愛	Hins Cheung
逼得太緊	Kary Ng
富士山下	Eason Chan
化	Miriam Yeung
花落誰家	Hacken Lee
愛回家	Leo Ku
零時零分	Joey Yung
男人KTV	Justin Lo
無心戀唱	Vincy Chan
木紋	Denise Ho

== Additional awards ==
Award	Song (if available for award)	Recipient
The most popular group (最受歡迎組合獎)	-	(gold) Twins
-	-	(silver) EO2
-	-	(bronze) HotCha
The most popular new male artist (最受歡迎新人獎) (男)	愛在記憶中找你	(gold) Raymond Lam
-	-	(silver) Jason Chan Pak Yu
-	-	(bronze) Ken Hung
The most popular new female artist (最受歡迎新人獎) (女)	-	(gold) Elanne Kong
-	-	(silver) Wada Hiromi (裕美)
-	-	(bronze) Sherman Chung
New field award (新人薦場飆星獎)	-	Terence Siufay
The most popular commercial song (最受歡迎廣告歌曲大獎)	心花怒放	(gold) Joey Yung
-	永久保存	(silver) Jason Chan Pak Yu
-	你的味道	(bronze) HotCha
The most popular Chinese song (最受歡迎華語歌曲獎)	小小	(gold) Joey Yung
-	淘汰	(silver) Eason Chan
-	四人遊	(bronze) Khalil Fong, Fiona Sit
Most popular self-composed singer (最受歡迎唱作歌星)	-	(gold) Ivana Wong
-	-	(silver) Eric Suen (孫耀威)
-	-	(bronze) Louis Cheung
Outstanding performance award (傑出表現獎)	迷失表參道	(gold) Hins Cheung
-	-	(silver) Jade Kwan
-	-	(bronze) Patrick Tang
The best compositions (最佳作曲)	富士山下	Christopher Chak
The best lyrics (最佳填詞)	富士山下	Albert Leung
The best music arrangement (最佳編曲)	富士山下	Chan Pak (陳珀), C.Y.
The best song producer (最佳歌曲監製)	富士山下	Alvin Leong
Four channel award (四台聯頒音樂大獎)	花落誰家	Eric Kwok, Lam Yoek-ning, performed by Hacken Lee
Asian Pacific most popular Hong Kong male artist (亞太區最受歡迎香港男歌星獎)	-	Eason Chan
Asian Pacific most popular Hong Kong female artist (亞太區最受歡迎香港女歌星獎)	-	Twins
The most popular male artist (最受歡迎男歌星)	-	Eason Chan
The most popular female artist (最受歡迎女歌星)	-	Joey Yung
Gold song gold award (金曲金獎)	花落誰家	Hacken Lee
