= 1985 Jade Solid Gold Best Ten Music Awards Presentation =

Hong Kong music awards ceremony

The 1985 Jade Solid Gold Best Ten Music Awards Presentation (Chinese: 1985年度十大勁歌金曲頒獎典禮) was held in January 1986. It is part of the Jade Solid Gold Best Ten Music Awards Presentation series held in Hong Kong.

== Top 10 song awards ==
The top 10 songs (十大勁歌金曲) of 1985 are as follows.

Song name in Chinese	Artist
愛情陷阱	Alan Tam
情已逝	Jacky Cheung
不羈的風	Leslie Cheung
聽不到的說話	David Lui (呂方)
誰可相依	Julie Su
日本娃娃	Samuel Hui
壞女孩	Anita Mui
暴風女神 Lorelei	Alan Tam
雨夜的浪漫	Alan Tam
十分十二吋	George Lam

== Additional awards ==
Award	Song name (if available for award)	Recipient(s)
The Best Composition Award (最佳作曲獎)	誰可相依	Composer: Lam Manyee; Performed by: Julie Su
The Best Lyric Award (最佳填詞獎)	聽不到的說話	Lyrics by: Jolland Chan (向雪懷); Performed by: David Lui (呂方)
The Best Music Arrangement Award (最佳編曲獎)	聽不到的說話	Music Arrangement by: Lai Hok Ban (黎學斌); Performed by: David Lui (呂方)
The Best Music Arrangement Award (最佳編曲獎)	誰可相依	Music Arrangement by: Lam Manyee; Performed by: Julie Su
The Best Music Arrangement Award (最佳編曲獎)	雪山飛狐	Music Arrangement by: Joseph Koo; Performed by: David Lui (呂方), Susanna Kwan
The Best Record Album Produced Award (最佳唱片監製獎)	不羈的風	Music Producer by: Michael Lai; Performed by: Leslie Cheung
The Most Popular Male Artist Award (最受歡迎男歌星獎)	---	Alan Tam
The Most Popular Female Artist Award (最受歡迎女歌星獎)	---	Anita Mui
Gold Song Gold Award (金曲金獎)	愛情陷阱	Alan Tam
Jade Solid Gold Honour Award (勁歌金曲榮譽大獎)	---	Roman Tam
