= 2002 Jade Solid Gold Awards =

Hong Kong music awards ceremony

The 2002 Jade Solid Gold Best Ten Music Awards Presentation (Chinese: 2002度十大勁歌金曲頒獎典禮) was held in January 2003. It is part of the Jade Solid Gold Best Ten Music Awards Presentation series held in Hong Kong.

== Top 10 song awards ==
The top 10 songs (十大勁歌金曲) of 2002 are as follows.

| Song name in Chinese | Artist |
|---|---|
| 女人之苦 | Andy Hui |
| 傷逝 | Sally Yeh |
| 有福氣 | Kelly Chen |
| 愛不釋手 | Hacken Lee |
| 明年今日 | Eason Chan |
| 天生天養 | Andy Lau |
| 爭氣 | Joey Yung |
| 楊千嬅 | Miriam Yeung |
| 好心分手 | Candy Lo |
| 高妹正傳 | Gigi Leung |

== Additional awards ==
| Award | Song (if available for award) | Recipient |
|---|---|---|
| The best new group (最受歡迎新人組合獎) | – | (gold) Shine |
| – | – | (silver) EO2 |
| – | – | (bronze) Cookies |
| The most popular commercial song (最受歡迎廣告歌曲大獎) | 風箏與風 | (gold) Twins |
| – | 爭氣 | (silver) Joey Yung |
| – | 時光中飛舞 | (bronze) Bobo Chan, Tiffany Lee (李蘢怡) |
| Most popular mandarin song (最受歡迎國語歌曲獎) | 回到過去 | (gold) Jay Chou |
| – | Ask for more | (silver) F4 |
| – | 亂了情人 | (bronze) Jade Kwan |
| The most popular new artist (male) (最受歡迎新人獎) | – | (gold) Edwin Siu |
| – | – | (silver) Juno Mak |
| – | – | (bronze) Anson Hu |
| The most popular new artist (female) (最受歡迎新人獎) | – | (dual gold) Jade Kwan, Yumiko Cheng |
| – | – | (bronze) Chiu chung-yu (趙頌茹) |
| The best group song (最受歡迎合唱歌曲獎) | 魅力移動 | (gold) EO2, E-Kids, SiSi |
| – | 心寒 (合唱版) | (silver) Patrick Tang, Ronald Cheng |
| – | 方寸大亂 | (bronze) Barry Ip (葉文輝), Elle Choi (小雪) |
| Most popular self-composed singer (最受歡迎唱作歌星) | – | (gold) Gigi Leung |
| – | – | (silver) Daniel Chan |
| – | – | (bronze) Denise Ho |
| Most popular online song (最受歡迎網上金曲獎) | 失戀王 | (gold) Jordan Chan |
| – | 再見露絲瑪莉 | (silver) Denise Ho |
| – | I never told you | (bronze) Edison Chen |
| Outstanding performance award (傑出表現獎) | – | (gold) F4 |
| – | – | (silver) Twins |
| – | – | (bronze) Steven Ma |
| Rising star song (新星試打金曲獎) | 還你門匙 | Shawn Yue |
| Most popular adapted song award (最受歡迎改編歌曲演繹大獎) | 愛上殺手 | Juno Mak |
| The best compositions (最佳作曲) | 好心分手 | Mark Lui, performed by Candy Lo |
| The best lyrics (最佳填詞) | 失戀王 | Wyman Wong, performed by Jordan Chan |
| The best music arrangement (最佳編曲) | 傷逝 | Eric Kwok, performed by Sally Yeh |
| The best song producer (最佳歌曲監製) | 安靜 | Jay Chou |
| Community chest charity award (公益金慈善金曲大獎) | | F4, Twins |
| Four channel award (四台聯頒傳媒大獎) | 傷逝 | Eric Kwok, Albert Leung, performed by Sally Yeh |
| Jade solid gold 20th anniversary award (十大勁歌金曲二十週年榮譽大獎 ) | – | Roman Tam, Alan Tam, Anita Mui |
| The most popular male artist (最受歡迎男歌星) | – | Hacken Lee |
| The most popular female artist (最受歡迎女歌星) | – | Miriam Yeung |
| Asian Pacific most popular Hong Kong male artist (亞太區最受歡迎香港男歌星獎) | – | Andy Lau |
| Asian Pacific most popular Hong Kong female artist (亞太區最受歡迎香港女歌星獎) | – | Kelly Chen |
| Gold song gold award (金曲金獎) | 明年今日 | Eason Chan |
