= Trainee Cupid =

Studio album 見習愛神 by Twins
- Released: 2005
- Genre: Mandopop
- Language: Standard Chinese (Mandarin)
- Label: Emperor Entertainment Group

Twins chronology
Such A Better Day (2004)	Trainee Cupid (2005)	Around the World with 80 Dollars (2006)

Trainee Cupid (Chinese: 見習愛神) is the first Standard Chinese album by Hong Kong Cantopop girl group, Twins, released in 2005 by Emperor Entertainment Group. Various versions of this album exist, including of Hong Kong (3 version), Taiwan (3 version), Singapore/Malaysia (2 version) and China (2 version) versions. Also karaoke DVD and VCD versions of Trainee Cupid, featuring music videos of the songs listed below with few extra bonus videos, was released in August 2005.

The music video for Starlight Amusement features Taiwanese artist Danson Tang.

The tracks Trainee Cupid and Starlight Amusement were nominated for Top 10 Gold Songs at the Hong Kong TVB8 Awards, presented by television station TVB8, in 2005.

The album was awarded one of the 十大銷量國語唱片獲獎名單; 'Top 10 Selling Mandarin Albums of the Year' at the 2005 IFPI Hong Kong Album Sales Awards, presented by the Hong Kong branch of IFPI.

== Track listing ==
Track	Name	Romanization	Translation	Footnotes
1.	無敵超人	pinyin: Wúdí chāorén	Invincible Superman	Mandarin version of 大紅大紫
2.	見習愛神	pinyin: Jiànxí àishén	Trainee Cupid	Mandarin version of 明愛暗戀補習社
3.	莫斯科沒有眼淚	pinyin: Mòsīkē méiyǒu yǎnlèi	Moscow Has No Tears	Mandarin version of 下一站天后
4.	只要我長大	pinyin: Zhǐyào wǒ zhǎngdà	Only wish I could grow up	Mandarin version of 眼紅紅
5.	香濃	pinyin: Xiāng nóng	Hot perfume	
6.	瓶中沙	pinyin: Píng zhōng shā	Sand in the bottle	
7.	一半女生	pinyin: Yībàn nǚshēng	Half Schoolgirl	
8.	星光遊樂園	pinyin: Xīngguāng yóulèyuán	Starlight Amusement	
9.	同樣的兩個夢	pinyin: Tóngyàng de liǎnggè mèng	Identical Dreams	Mandarin version of 風箏與風
10.	數彩虹	pinyin: Shù cǎihóng	Counting Rainbows	
11.	老鼠愛大米 (in Cantonese)	Jyutping: lou5 syu2 ngoi3 daai6 mai5; pinyin: Lǎoshǔ ài dàmǐ	Mouse loves rice	Not included in some versions of the album
12.	老鼠愛大米	pinyin: Lǎoshǔ ài dàmǐ	Mouse loves rice	Not included in some versions of the album

- Note: All track in Standard Chinese (Mandarin Chinese) unless otherwise stated
