= 1995 Jade Solid Gold Best Ten Music Awards Presentation =

Hong Kong music awards ceremony

The 1995 Jade Solid Gold Best Ten Music Awards Presentation (Chinese: 1995年度十大勁歌金曲頒獎典禮) was held in January 1996. It is part of the Jade Solid Gold Best Ten Music Awards Presentation series held in Hong Kong.

== Top 10 song awards ==
The top 10 songs (十大勁歌金曲) of 1995 are as follows.

Song name in Chinese	Artist
濃情化不開	Emil Chau
純真傳說	Aaron Kwok
捨不得你	Sammi Cheng
危情追蹤	Leon Lai
我寂寞	Priscilla Chan
情未鳥	Andy Lau
春光乍洩	Anthony Wong
離開以後	Jacky Cheung
小玩意	Cass Phang
你沒有好結果	Amanda Lee

== Additional awards ==
Award	Song (if available for award)	Recipient
The best group songs (最受歡迎合唱歌曲獎)	打開天空	(gold) Daniel Chan, Kelly Chen, Ray Chan (陳建穎), Joyce Yau (邱穎欣)
–	分甘同味	(silver) Natalis Chan, Alan Tam
–	神話, 情話	(bronze) Wakin Chau, Chyi Yu
Most popular Mandarin song (最受歡迎國語歌曲獎)	真永遠	(gold) Andy Lau
–	一千個傷心的理由	(silver) Jacky Cheung
–	一言難盡	(bronze) Phil Chang
Most popular creative singer (最受歡迎創作歌手)	–	(gold) Wakin Chau
–	–	(silver) Phil Chang
–	–	(bronze) Tin zik-tong (天織堂)
Outstanding performance award (傑出表現獎)	–	(gold) Amanda Lee (李蕙敏)
–	–	(silver) Adam Cheng
–	–	(bronze) Kelly Chen
The best music arrangement (最佳編曲獎)	迷糊, 情慾, 對象	C.Y. Kong, performed by Andy Hui
The best song producer (最佳歌曲監製獎)	純真傳說	Mark Lui, Siu mei (小美), performed by Aaron Kwok
The most popular new artist (最受歡迎新人獎)	–	(gold) Kelly Chen
–	–	(silver) Christine Ng (伍詠薇)
–	–	(bronze) Daniel Chan
The best music video (最佳音樂錄影帶獎)	迷糊, 情慾, 對象	Director導演 Tsang Hin Chung (曾憲宗), performed by Andy Hui
The best music video performance award (最佳音樂錄影帶演出獎)	失憶(諒解)備忘錄	Aaron Kwok
CASH most popular award (CASH最佳中文流行歌曲獎)	春光乍洩	Anthony Wong, Jason Choi (蔡德才), Albert Leung, performed by Anthony Wong
The most popular male artist (最受歡迎男歌星獎)	–	Leon Lai
The most popular female artist (最受歡迎女歌星獎)	–	Cass Phang
Asian Pacific the most popular Hong Kong male artist (亞太區最受歡迎香港男歌星獎)	–	Andy Lau
Asian Pacific the most popular Hong Kong female artist (亞太區最受歡迎香港女歌星獎)	–	Faye Wong
Gold song gold award (金曲金獎)	離開以後	Jacky Cheung
Best city romance song (全城至愛金曲)	我至叻	Natalis Chan
Honours award (榮譽大獎)	–	Teresa Teng
