= 2001 Jade Solid Gold Awards =

Hong Kong music awards ceremony

The 2001 Jade Solid Gold Best Ten Music Awards Presentation (Chinese: 2001度十大勁歌金曲頒獎典禮) was held in January 2002. It is part of the Jade Solid Gold Best Ten Music Awards Presentation series held in Hong Kong.

== Top 10 song awards ==
The top 10 songs (十大勁歌金曲) of 2001 are as follows.

Song name in Chinese	Artist
Shall We Talk	Eason Chan
最愛演唱會	Kelly Chen
Para Para Sakura	Aaron Kwok
姊妹	Miriam Yeung
玉蝴蝶	Nicholas Tse
夏日 Fiesta	Andy Lau
終身美麗	Sammi Cheng
爛泥	Andy Hui
飛花	Hacken Lee
痛愛	Joey Yung

== Additional awards ==
Award	Song (if available for award)	Recipient
Annual outstanding award (2001年度傑出表現獎)	–	(Gold) Gigi Leung
–	–	(silver) Leehom Wang
–	–	(bronze) Steven Ma
Most popular mandarin song (最受歡迎國語歌曲獎)	開不了口	(gold) Jay Chou
–	唯一	(silver) Leehom Wang
–	我的心只可容納你	(bronze) Andy Lau
The most popular new artist (male) (最受歡迎新人獎)	–	(gold) Jay Chou
–	–	(silver) Alex Fong
–	–	(bronze) Victor Chen (陳司翰)
The most popular new artist (female) (最受歡迎新人獎)	–	(gold) Denise Ho
–	–	(silver) Bobo Chan
–	–	(bronze) Mango Wong (王秀琳)
The most popular commercial song (最受歡迎廣告歌曲大獎)	走出地平線	(gold) Gigi Leung
–	彩色世界	(silver) Stephanie Che
–	全身暑假	(bronze) Joey Yung
Most popular online song (最受歡迎網上金曲獎)	犯 賤	Jordan Chan
The best group (最受歡迎組合獎)	–	(gold) Twins
–	–	(silver) VRF
–	–	(bronze) Swing
Rising star song (新星試打金曲獎)	戀愛拼圖	Emme Wong
The best group songs (最受歡迎合唱歌曲獎)	意猶未盡	(gold) William So, Rain Lee
–	其實我介意	(silver) Terence Lam (林漢洋), Elle Choi (小雪)
–	拾荒蛋糕	(bronze) Nicholas Tse, Grace Ip (葉佩雯)
Most popular adapted song award (最受歡迎改編歌曲演繹大獎)	絕對美麗	Aaron Kwok
Most popular self-composed singer (最受歡迎唱作歌星)	星晴	(gold) Jay Chou
–	–	(silver) Andy Lau
–	–	(bronze) Nicholas Tse
Honours award (十大勁歌金曲致敬大獎)	–	Anita Mui
The best compositions (最佳作曲)	Shall We Talk	Chan Fai-young
The best lyrics (最佳填詞)	爛泥	Joe Lei (李峻一)
The best music arrangement (最佳編曲)	Para para sakura	Peter Kam
The best song producer (最佳歌曲監製)	玉蝴蝶	Carl Wong (王雙駿), Nicholas Tse
Four channel award (四台聯頒傳媒大獎)	–	(gold) Joey Yung
–	–	(silver) Edison Chen
–	–	(bronze) Jay Chou
Community chest charity award (公益金慈善金曲大獎)	誰令你心痴	Aaron Kwok, Twins
Asian Pacific most popular Hong Kong male artist (亞太區最受歡迎香港男歌星獎)	–	Andy Lau
Asian Pacific most popular Hong Kong female artist (亞太區最受歡迎香港女歌星獎)	–	Kelly Chen
The most popular male artist (最受歡迎男歌星)	–	Andy Hui
The most popular female artist (最受歡迎女歌星)	–	Sammi Cheng
Gold song gold award (金曲金獎)	Shall we talk	Eason Chan
