= Yumiko Cheng =

- Born: 6 September 1981 (age 45); Shanghai, China
- Occupations: Singer; actress
- Years active: 1991–present

Chinese name
- Traditional Chinese: 鄭希怡
- Simplified Chinese: 郑希怡
Transcriptions
Standard Mandarin
- Hanyu Pinyin: Zhèng Xīyí
Yue: Cantonese
- Yale Romanization: Jehng Hēiyì
- Jyutping: Zeng6 Hei1ji4
- Musical career
- Also known as: Cheng Hei Yee (Cantonese Jyutping)
- Origin: Hong Kong
- Genres: Cantopop
- Instrument: Singing
- Label: Emperor Entertainment Group
- Formerly of: 3T
- Website: Official Website

Yumiko Cheng (born 6 September 1981) is a Hong Kong Cantopop singer and actress. Cheng was given the Japanese nickname "Yumiko" by her friends in secondary school, and upon signing with EEG, adopted it as her official stagename.

== Career ==
Cheng was originally marketed as a member of the group 3T (along with Mandy Chiang and Maggie Lau), which released an EP in 2002. She was the sole member of the group who went on to release a solo EP later that year. This was followed by a second EP, DanceDanceDance (舞舞舞) and her first full-length album One2Three, in 2003.

In 2004, she released the album, Perfect Date, though made a decreasing number of media appearances due to health problems and an overall strategy re-evaluation within her company.

2005 saw a return with the lead single 'Arabian Market' (亞拉伯市場), complemented by a novel image that featured her in traditional Arabic dress. She would continue covering Middle-Eastern pop hits in subsequent singles such as 'Lupine Girl' (狼女, originally sung by Aneela Mirza) in 2006, and 'Five Centuries' (五個世紀, OT: Bechom Shei In The Heart of Tel Aviv by Sarit Hadad) in 2008, which became a minor hit in its own right in the Chinese dance charts, and was even mentioned in a report by a major Israeli newspaper.

Yumiko's Space, the 2005 album to which 'Arabian Market' (亞拉伯市場) belonged, otherwise showed an 80s disco and electronic influence. Veteran music producer Carl Wong (王雙駿) took on songwriting and production credits for 6 songs, including that of the second single 'Think' (想). Electronic pop duo PixelToy also contributed one song, who again appear with songwriting credits on Cheng's 2008 Mandarin album Spectacular Era (精彩年代). Cheng has interviewed in the past that Yumiko's Space remained a personal favourite of all her albums.

Aside from a career in pop music, Cheng has starred in several films, including a special guest appearance in Stanley Kwan's 2005 feature, Everlasting Regret. In August 2015, Cheng left Emperor Entertainment Group after 15 years, and has since focused on acting for mainland television dramas as well as developing her clothing label, "Why So Cool".

== Wardrobe malfunction incidents ==
Cheng dominated the entertainment headlines in December 2006, due to a wardrobe mishap while performing an aerialist stunt for TVB's annual charity show. While being retrieved from mid-air on a trapeze, her trousers were accidentally pulled off by her stunt partner Chin Kar-lok, revealing her underwear. Much to Cheng's embarrassment, the incident garnered a great deal of media attention. The MC Eric Tsang later apologised due to public disapproval over a number of remarks made at the time of the incident, including a request for a replay of the accident in slow motion, though other MCs such as Nancy Sit and Lydia Shum were seen to have laughed uncontrollably in the television broadcast.

She again made news on 23 June 2007 while performing as a featured guest for New Talent Singing Awards Toronto Audition, where she exposed part of her bare chest. The material was cut from the delayed broadcast in Vancouver.

When pressed by Stephen Chen in a 2008 TVB interview to comment on whether or not these incidents were staged, Cheng's manager, Mani Fok remarks: "Every woman has a bottom line."

== Personal life ==
In June 2012, Yumiko Cheng participated in Cherrie Ying's birthday party in Phuket, Thailand. Because the swimming pool was slippery, a group of actresses and birthday girls suddenly stumbled and fell on the hillside next to the pool. The birthday girl was only slightly injured, but Yumiko Cheng had too much momentum when she fell down the hillside. She was pierced through her lungs by a branch from her back. The condition was serious. People on the scene called an ambulance to send her to the hospital and was sent to the intensive care unit. She was in a coma for two days or two. At night, after a round of rescue, it finally got better.

In August 2012, it was announced that she accepted the proposal of her makeup artist boyfriend Andy for years. The wedding was held on September 5, 2014, the day before her 33rd birthday. It was also revealed on Twins Weibo and Facebook.

On April 8, 2015, she gave birth to her daughter Liang Zirou (baby name: Liang Jiezhu) at the Hong Kong Adventist Hospital, but she was less than 24 hours old. Due to respiratory problems and pulmonary hydrops, she had to be transferred to the Intensive Care Department of Eastern Hospital. The hospital can be discharged after two weeks. In 2019, Cheng's daughter Liang Jiji celebrated her fourth birthday. Liang is one of the second generations of popular stars on the Internet. Liang Bianzhu has been dressed stylishly since he was a child, and the two mothers and daughters often pretend to be parent-child.

== Discography ==
'As 3T'

- 2002: Girl Butterfly 少女蝶

Solo Albums:

- 26 November 2002: Yumiko The Debut EP
- 6 June 2003: Dance Dance Dance (舞舞舞) EP
- 14 November 2003: One 2 Three
- 20 August 2004: Perfect Date
- 21 June 2005: Yumiko's Space
- 13 April 2006: Passion
- 10 November 2006: 7 Nutrients (Yumiko New + Best Selection) (七連滋養)
- 21 March 2007: Shanghai Doll (上海娃娃)
- 2 February 2008: Super Model
- 20 November 2008: Wonderful Time (精彩年代)
- 25 September 2014: I'm A Lucky Girl (New + Best Selection)

== Filmography ==
=== Film ===
Year	Film	Role	Notes
1991	Center Stage		
1992	New Dragon Gate Inn		
2002	Demi-Haunted		
2003	Love Under the Sun		
2004	Heat Team	Fung Po-Po	1st Female Lead
2004	The Attractive One		2nd Female Lead
2005	Everlasting Regret	Zhang Yonghong	
2007	The Lady Iron Chef	May	3rd Female Lead
2007	The Drummer	Carmen	3rd Female Lead
2007	Meet the Robinsons	Franny	Cantonese version
2008	Love Is Elsewhere	Sandra	2nd Female Lead
2008	True Women for Sale	Ob-Gyn Nurse	Cameo Appearance
2009	All's Well, Ends Well 2009		
2011	Treasure Inn		
2012	Nightfall		
2012	The Bullet Vanishes		2nd Female Lead
2012	Fortune Cookies		
2013	The Midas Touch		
2014	Aberdeen		
2016	Good Take!		
2017	77 Heartbreaks		
2019	77 Heartwarmings		

=== TV series ===
Year	Title	Role	Notes
2002	All About Boy'z	Stephaine	Supporting Role 女配角
2005	The Proud Twins	Jiang Yufeng	Supporting Role 女配角
2008	The Gentle Crackdown II	Chan Sai-Mui	Pairs up with Steven Ma; 1st Female Lead 第一女主角
2009	Stage of Youth	Shen Su Cai	3st Female Lead 第三女主角
2011	Love Amongst War		
2017	Heart and Greed	Crystal	Guest Star appearance
2017	OCTB	Ah-Yan	Daughter of Hon Bun
2020	Forensic Heroes IV	Monique Hau Man-li	Supporting Role 女配角
2020	Sisters Who Make Waves	cast member	乘风破浪的姐姐
2021	Love at Night	Li Sa	Supporting Role
2022	Nothing But You	Ning Xia	
2023–2024	Blossoms Shanghai	Reporter	Supporting Role 女配角

=== Television shows ===
Year	Title	Role	Network	Notes
2020	Beautivels	Host	HOY TV	EP5-6

== Awards and nominations ==
Year	Award	Category	Nominee	Result
2003	2002 Jade Solid Gold Awards	The most popular new artist (female)	—N/a	Gold
2003	2002 RTHK Top 10 Gold Songs Awards	Silver blessing award	—N/a	Won
2003	Music Pioneer Awards 2002	Best New Artist (female)	—N/a	silver
2004	2003 Jade Solid Gold Awards	Outstanding performance award	—N/a	Gold
2008	Music Pioneer Awards 2008	Top 10 Songs – Hong Kong/Taiwan	Little cleverness	Won
2008	Music Pioneer Awards 2008	Most Improved Award	—N/a	Won
2010	Music Pioneer Awards 2009	Dance Music Award (female)	—N/a	Won
2011	Music Pioneer Awards 2010	Dance Music Award (female)	—N/a	Won
