= Twins (2001 EP) =

EP by Twins
- Released: August 15, 2001
- Genre: Cantopop
- Length: 50:05
- Label: Emperor Entertainment Group

Twins chronology
| Twins (2001) | Twins' Love (2002) |

Twins (AVEP) was the first EP for Twins and was released in August 2001. It contained 3 music videos and 6 songs. Among the songs, Ming Ai An Lian Bu Xi She (明愛暗戀補習社) was popular.

== Release, promotion and marketing ==
In an effort to promote the EP to a younger audience, Emperor Entertainment Group bundled the EP with bonus items and coupons, such as hair care products and vouchers for gifts of sushi.

The initial EP release was a success, selling 10,000 copies in under 24 hours.

== Track listing ==
1. Computer Data Not Playable
2. "明愛暗戀補習社 [Opening Love & Secret Love in Tutoring Class]" (Music Video)
3. "女校男生 [Male Student in Girls' School]" (Music Video)
4. "明愛暗戀補習社 [Opening Love & Secret Love in Tutoring Class]" (Music Video 拍攝花絮 [Behind The Scenes])
5. "快熟時代 [Fast Maturing Era]"
6. "明愛暗戀補習社 [Opening Love & Secret Love in Tutoring Class]" (Assembly Mix)
7. "女校男生 [Male Student in Girls' School]"
8. "換季 [Changing Seasons]"
9. "盲頭烏蠅 (Blind-headed Fly)"
10. "明愛暗戀補習社 [Opening Love & Secret Love in Tutoring Class]" (After School Mix)
