= 2005 Jade Solid Gold Awards =

Hong Kong music awards ceremony

The 2005 Jade Solid Gold Best Ten Music Awards Presentation (Chinese: 2005年度十大勁歌金曲頒獎典禮) was held in January 2006. It is part of the Jade Solid Gold Best Ten Music Awards Presentation series held in Hong Kong.

== Top 10 song awards ==
The top 10 songs (十大勁歌金曲) of 2005 are as follows.

Song name in Chinese	Artist
希望	Kelly Chen
無賴	Ronald Cheng
繼續談情	Andy Lau
情非首爾	Hacken Lee
男孩像你	Fiona Sit
明日恩典	Joey Yung
天才與白痴	Leo Ku
烈女	Miriam Yeung
夕陽無限好	Eason Chan
勞斯．萊斯	Denise Ho

== Additional awards ==
Award	Song (if available for award)	Recipient
The most popular group (最受歡迎組合獎)	-	(gold) Twins
-	-	(silver) Grasshopper
-	-	(bronze) Soler
The most popular new male artist (最受歡迎新人獎) (男)	-	(gold) Justin Lo
-	-	(silver) Ron Ng
-	-	(bronze) Kenny Kwan
The most popular new female artist (最受歡迎新人獎) (女)	-	(gold) Janice Vidal
-	-	(silver) Ivana Wong
-	-	(bronze) Toby Leung
Newcomer rising song award (新人飆升歌曲獎)	吉絲蒂的衣櫃	Krusty
The most popular commercial song (最受歡迎廣告歌曲大獎)	聽聽	(gold) Eason Chan
-	完美關係	(silver) Kelly Chen
-	冬令時間	(bronze) Twins
The most popular Chinese song (最受歡迎華語歌曲獎)	再說一次.我愛你	(gold) Andy Lau
-	愛可以問誰	(silver) Hacken Lee
-	星光遊樂園	(bronze) Twins
The best duet song (最受歡迎合唱歌曲獎)	刻不容緩	Hacken Lee, Joey Yung
Most popular self-composed singer (最受歡迎唱作歌星)	-	(gold) Tat Ming Pair
-	-	(silver) Ivana Wong
-	-	(bronze) Endy Chow
Outstanding performance award (傑出表現獎)	-	(gold) Denise Ho
-	-	(silver) Pong Nan (藍奕邦)
-	-	(bronze) Jolie Chan (陳苑淇)
The best compositions (最佳作曲)	夕陽無限好	Eric Kwok, performed by Eason Chan
The best lyrics (最佳填詞)	夕陽無限好	Albert Leung, performed by Eason Chan
The best music arrangement (最佳編曲)	情非首爾	Ronald Fu, performed by Hacken Lee
The best song producer (最佳歌曲監製)	Blessing	Hins Cheung
Community chest charity live-combination award (公益金 Live 大不同組合大獎)	-	Andy Lau, Twins
Four channel award (四台聯頒音樂大獎)	天才與白痴	張佳添, BC, 鄭汝森, Albert Leung, performed by Leo Ku
Asian Pacific most popular Hong Kong male artist (亞太區最受歡迎香港男歌星獎)	-	Andy Lau
Asian Pacific most popular Hong Kong female artist (亞太區最受歡迎香港女歌星獎)	-	Kelly Chen
The most popular male artist (最受歡迎男歌星)	-	Hacken Lee
The most popular female artist (最受歡迎女歌星)	-	Joey Yung
Gold song gold award (金曲金獎)	無賴	Ronald Cheng
