= Twins Language =

Studio album by Twins
- Released: January 2008
- Recorded: 2007
- Genre: Mandopop
- Label: Emperor Entertainment Group

Twins chronology
Twins Party (2007)	Twins Language (2008)	Everyone Bounce (2010)

Twins Language is an album by Hong Kong duo Twins. It is their third mandarin album. It was released in January 2008. It is their last album before break-up.

== Background ==
The album was recorded in 2007. It was released on January 8, 2008, two months before their break up. They reunited in 2010 with album Everyone Bounce.

== Track listing ==
1. "Cute - Repulsive" (Charlene Choi version)
2. "Younger Sister"
3. "60 分"
4. "Mutual Relationship"
5. "酷"
6. "Cute - Repulsive" (Gillian Chung version)
7. "Can You See It?" (Gillian Solo)
8. "季节 限定"
9. "自由行 不行"
10. "飘零 燕 (国语 版)"
