= Are You Sleeping =

Are You Sleeping may refer to:

- the nursery rhyme Frère Jacques
- Truth Be Told (2019 TV series), a mystery TV series on Apple TV+ originally titled Are You Sleeping?
