= Amazing Album =

Studio album by Twins
- Released: August 2002
- Genre: Cantopop
- Label: Emperor Entertainment Group

Twins chronology
Our Souvenir (2002)	Amazing Album (2002)	Happy Together (2002)

Amazing Album is the fifth CD for Twins and was released in August 2002. It consisted of 2 discs, one of which was a CD with 11 songs and a VCD with 3 music videos.

== CD content ==
=== Disc one ===
1. "ICHIBAN Xing Fen" (ICHIBAN興奮) (The theme song of the Nissin Cup Noodles advertisement)
2. "Ren Bi Ren" (人比人)
3. "Mo Fa Wang Guo" (魔法王國)
4. "Tuo Tuo Bu Ha Mu Tai Lang" (跅跅步哈姆太郎) (The theme song of a Japanese cartoon 哈姆太郎)
5. "200% Zhou Yu" (200%咒語) (The ending song of the Japanese cartoon 哈姆太郎)
6. "Peng You Zi" (朋友仔)
7. "Ni Shi Wo De UFO" (你是我的UFO) (The theme song of the Nissin UFO advertisement)
8. "Wo De UFO" (我的UFO) (The theme song of the Nissin UFO advertisement in Putonghua version)
9. "Melody Fair" (A song for the film Just One Look)
10. "Li Wo Qian Xiao" (梨渦淺笑) (A song for the film Just One Look)
11. "Da Hong Da Zi" (大紅大紫)

=== Disc two ===
1. "ICHIBAN Xing Fen" (ICHIBAN興奮) (Music Video)
2. "Da Hong Da Zi" (大紅大紫) (Music Video)
3. "Tuo Tuo Bu Ha Mu Tai Lang" (跅跅步哈姆太郎) (Music Video)
