= Touch of Love (album) =

Studio album by Twins
- Released: April 2003
- Genre: Cantopop
- Label: Emperor Entertainment Group

Twins chronology
Amazing Album (2002)	Touch of Love (2003)	Evolution (2003)

Touch of Love is the seventh album of Twins and was released in April 2003. It contains 2 discs. One is a CD with 11 new songs while the other one is a VCD, which had a music video for "Xia Yi Zhan Tian Hou" (下一站天后).

Two months later (June 2003), a second version was released. A new song and its music video "Bian Bian Bian" (變變變), the theme song of the movie The Twins Effect and sung by Twins and Jackie Chan, were added.

== CD Content ==
=== First Version ===
Disc 1

1. 多謝失戀 (Thank You For The Break-up)
2. 我們要睡覺 (We Have To Sleep)
3. 我的爸爸媽媽 (My Parent) [Solo version, Featuring Gillian Chung]
4. 千金 (Thousand Gold)
5. 那天很愛笑 (Loved To Laugh)
6. 講玩 (Jokes)
7. 女朋友 (Girlfriend)
8. 下一站天后 (Next Station, Tian Hou) [Solo version, Featuring Charlene Choi]
9. 童子軍 (Scouts)
10. 咩世界 (What's The World?)
11. 下一站天后 (Next Station, Tian Hou)

Disc 2

1. 下一站天后 (Next Station, Tian Hou) [Music Video]

=== Second Version ===
1. "Bian Bian Bian" (變變變) (the theme song of the film Twins Effect)(Music Video)
2. "Xia Yi Zhan Tian Hou" (下一站天后) (Music Video)
3. "Bian Bian Bian" (變變變) (featuring Twins and Jackie Chan, the theme song of the film Twins Effect)
4. "Duo Xie Shi Lian" (多謝失戀)
5. "Wo Men Yao Shui Jiao" (我們要睡覺)
6. "Wo De Ba Ba Ma Ma" (我的爸爸媽媽) (Solo version, featuring Gillian Chung)
7. "Qian Jin" (千金)
8. "Na Tian Hen Ai Xiao" (那天很愛笑)
9. "Jiang Wan" (講玩)
10. "Nu Peng You" (女朋友)
11. "Xia Yi Zhan Tian Hou" (下一站天后) (Solo version, featuring Charlene Choi)
12. "Tong Zi Jun" (童子軍)
13. "Mie Shi Jie" (咩世界)
14. "Xia Yi Zhan Tian Hou" (下一站天后)
