= Evolution (Twins album) =

Studio album by Twins
- Released: September 2003
- Genre: Cantopop
- Label: Emperor Entertainment Group

Twins chronology
Touch of Love (2003)	Evolution (2003)	Singing in the Twins Wonderland (Volume 1) (2003)

Alternative cover

Evolution (進化論), is the eighth album of Twins and was released September 2003. The disc contains 10 songs.

== CD content ==
1. "Luan Shi Jia Ren" (亂世佳人)
2. "Ni Jiang Ni Ai Wo" (你講你愛我)
3. "Huang Xin Jia Qi" (慌心假期)
4. "You Know What I Mean"
5. "Peng YOu De Ai" (朋友的愛)
6. "Xia Ru Kuang Hua" (夏日狂嘩)
7. "Gao Wen Yu Jia" (高溫瑜伽)
8. "Xiang Gang Niu Yue" (香港紐約)
9. "Beautiful Day"
10. "San Jiao Yuan Wu" (三角圓舞)
