= Around the World with 80 Dollars =

- Around the World with 80 Dollars cover

Studio album 80块环游世界 by Twins
- Released: June 2006
- Genre: Mandopop
- Language: Mandarin
- Label: Emperor Entertainment Group

Twins chronology
The Missing Piece (2005)	Around the World with 80 Dollars (2006)	Ho Hoo Tan (2006)

Around the World with 80 Dollars is the second Mandarin album by Hong Kong Cantopop girl group, Twins. It was released in June 2006 by EEG.

The music video for "我很想爱他" (I Really Want to Love Him) features Taiwanese artist Danson Tang.

The tracks "一时无俩" (One Time not Twice) and "我很想爱他" (I Really Want to Love Him) were nominated and "80块环游世界" (Around the World with 80 Dollars) won Top 10 Gold Songs at the Hong Kong TVB8 Awards, presented by television station TVB8, in 2006.

== Track listing ==
1. "变身派对" (Transformation Party)
2. "80块环游世界" (Around the World with 80 Dollars)
3. "我很想爱他" (I Really Want to Love Him)
4. "流金摇摆" (Flowing Gold Swing Swans)
5. "今天星期几" (Which Day is Today?) - Gillian Chung Solo
6. "一时无俩" (One Time not Twice)
7. "妳最勇敢" (You are the Bravest)
8. "黑盒子" (Black Box)
9. "一个人看电影" (Watching Movie Alone) - Charlene Choi Solo
10. "森巴" (Samba)
