= Jade Kwan =

Hong Kong singer (born 1979)

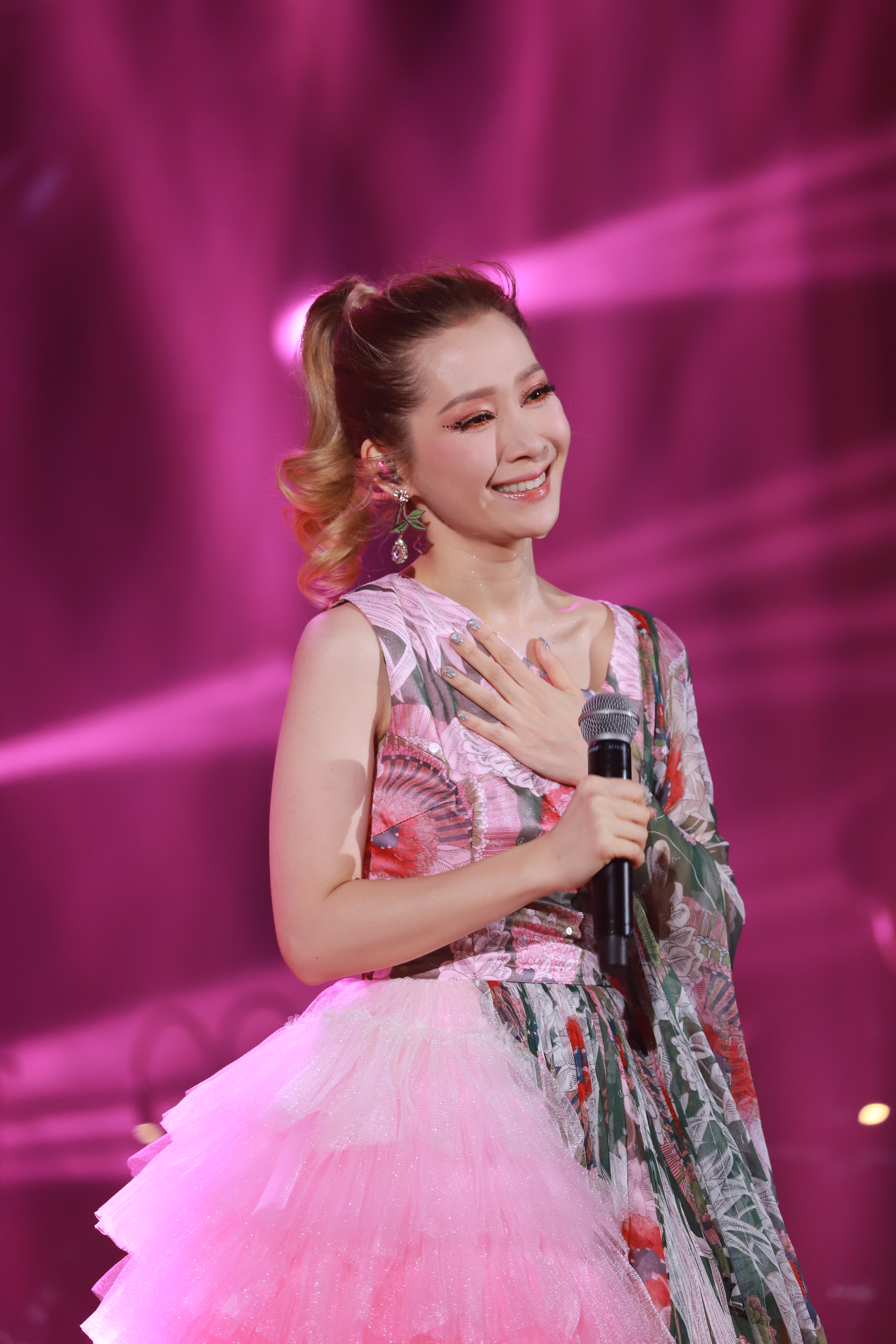
- Kwan performing in Guangzhou, 2019
- Born: Kwan Wai-man (關惠文); July 31, 1979 (age 47); Hong Kong
- Occupations: Singer; philanthropist
- Years active: 2002–present
- Spouse: Jonas Yeung (m. 2009)
- Children: 1

Chinese name
- Traditional Chinese: 關心妍
- Simplified Chinese: 关心妍
Transcriptions
Standard Mandarin
- Hanyu Pinyin: guan1 xin1 yan2
Yue: Cantonese
- Jyutping: gwaan1 sam1 jin4
- Musical career
- Origin: Hong Kong
- Genres: Cantopop
- Instruments: Vocals, Piano, Guitar, Saxophone
- Labels: Stars Shine International (2010–present); BMA Records (1999–2009)
- Website: www.jadekwan.club

Kwan Wai-Man (born July 31, 1979), better known professionally as Jade Kwan Sum-Yin (Chinese: 關心妍), is a Hong Kong and Canadian singer and philanthropist. Originally from Vancouver, she entered the music industry after winning the 1999 New Talent Singing Awards Canada Finals and the Best Potential Newcomer Award at the New Talent Singing Awards International Finals of the same year. She debuted under BMA Records in July 2002 with the album Jade-1, winning multiple best new artist awards and has since released more than 13 albums and extended plays. Kwan is known for her philanthropic work and has been awarded the 2012 Ten Outstanding Young Persons Selection and the Hong Kong Volunteer Award in 2011. She is the founder and chairperson of charitable organization Shining Life Limited 妍亮生命慈善基金.

== Life and career ==
=== 1979–1999: Early life and career beginnings ===
Kwan was born in Hong Kong on July 31, 1979. She has an older brother. After her parents' divorce when she was eight years old, she immigrated with her mother and brother to British Columbia, Canada in 1990. Her mother returned to Hong Kong after a few years for work. Feeling uncomfortable in a new environment, Kwan had stated that she had engaged in smoking, underage drinking, and skipped school when she was twelve years old. She had also contemplated suicide when her first boyfriend broke up with her.

After graduating high school, she entered the New Talent Singing Awards Vancouver Audition 1999 (新秀歌唱大賽溫哥華選拔賽) with the song "Face" (臉, originally sung by Chinese diva Faye Wong) and was awarded first runner-up. As such, she advanced to the New Talent Singing Awards Canada Finals 1999 (新秀歌唱大賽加拿大總決賽) and won. She then competed in the New Talent Singing Awards International Finals 1999 (1999 年全球華人新秀歌唱大賽, also representing Vancouver) and won the "Best Potential Newcomer Award" (最具潛質獎) at the International Finals held in Shanghai, China.

=== 2002–2003: Debut and breakthrough ===
She returned to Hong Kong hoping to pursue a career in singing, eventually landing a 10-year deal with BMA Records. Kwan did not officially debut until 2002, stating that for three years she did not have jobs, instead spent time learning music theory and how to play the tenor sax and violin. She relied on her mother for financial support, stating "the amount of money my mother invested in me really can't be calculated, it must be more than six figures."

She made her debut with the Mandarin single "Ruined Your Lover" 亂了情人 and followed with Cantonese release "Can't Stand For It" 負擔不起, both well received by radio stations. Her debut studio album, Jade-1, containing 11 tracks, was released July 3, 2002. She achieved her first number one hit on RTHK and TVB's Jade Solid Gold Song Chart with the song "You Have Heart" 你有心, released in her second studio album Jade-2 on December 20 of the same year. Both Jade-1 and Jade-2 reached gold certification, selling 30,000 copies and 50,000 copies respectively. As such, Kwan was awarded 2002 IFPI Best Selling Local Female Newcomer. She swept newcomer awards at year-end music award shows, including Best Prospect Award Gold Prize at the 25th RTHK Top 10 Gold Songs Awards, Best New Female Artist at Metro Radio Music Awards, Ultimate Song Chart's Female Newcomer Gold Prize, Most Popular Female Newcomer (Gold prize) at the 2002 TVB Jade Solid Gold Best Ten Music Awards.

=== 2004–2005: Controversies and The 5th Element ===
In efforts to promote Kwan for her concert, BMA Records gave Cable TV Hong Kong footage of Kwan's rehearsal in Japan, along with Cantonese interview footage. This sparked controversy with TVB, as the act was considered a breach of contract. Subsequently, all artistes under BMA Records management were banned from appearing on TVB programmes, which at the time was considered an important medium. Jade made a public apology, stating, "I am a TVB contract artiste, perhaps the company [BMA Records] was negligent... I hope TVB will be lenient".

More controversy ensued when an internet rumour spread in November 2004, known as "My Sister Got Fired" (家姐被炒潮文), in which Kwan supposedly gotten a retail sales representative fired. Kwan repeatedly stated the story was false; however, her popularity decreased significantly. It also earned her the nickname "Sister Kwan".

=== 2009–2010: Shine and A New Beginning ===
After her contract with BMA ended in May 2009, Kwan focused her efforts on recording a Christian album. Shine was released under Jade Star Limited on September 21, containing 12 tracks.

Kwan signed with Stars Shine International in 2010 and returned to the charts with the single "Starting Over", a Cantonese version of Liu Liyang's "Present". Her album A New Beginning was released October 11, 2010. A second single, "Try Love Personally" was released to critical success, with Kwan being praised for her vocal ability. She won Top 10 Song at the 33th RTHK Top 10 Gold Song Awards; Best Performance, Best Female Singer, and Hit Song at the 2010 Metro Radio Hit Music Awards. With Stars Shine International failing to obtain a date for a Hong Kong Coliseum concert for Kwan, she decided not to renew her contract after it ended in 2011.

=== 2011–2013: Still, Concert, and Pause ===
"Still" 仍然 was released to radio stations in October 2011. The single reached number one on Metro Radio Hits Pop Chart, JSG Song Chart, and on RTHK. The song won Top 10 Song at the 2011 JSG Music Awards. On January 20, 2012, Kwan headlined her second Coliseum concert titled Jade Sings. Special guests included Chilam Cheung, Shirley Kwan, and the Grasshoppers.

On September 30, 2012, Kwan was named as one of the recipients of the 2012 Ten Outstanding Young Persons Selection, becoming the fifth Hong Kong female singer to receive the award. As promotion for her upcoming album, Kwan held a mini concert, Neway Music Live x Jade Kwan, on September 23. On October 12, she released the album Pause. The album contained six new tracks, and three from the previous EP. The single "Lovelorn Philosophy" 失戀哲理 topped the JSG Chart and the Metro Radio Hits Pop Chart. The song won Hit Song and Kwan won Best Female Singer at the 2012 Metro Radio Hit Music Awards. "Lovelorn Philosophy" also won Top 10 at the JSG Awards Show.

After not receiving any recognition at the 35th RTHK Top 10 Gold Song Awards, Kwan posted on Sina Weibo that she was disappointed in music award shows, and that she will no longer attend award presentations. She stated: "I will not give up music. I just don't plan on releasing more albums and decided not to play this game of award shows. Previously I said I would work hard for one more year because of my co-workers' and fans' support, but the result of working hard for a year disappointed everyone... I am too." She further stated that after completing her work on hand, she take a hiatus to try and start a family. In March 2013, Kwan and her label were in talks of renewing her contract. She stated, "Mr. Sit [owner of Star Entertainment] treats me like a daughter, only telling me to sing well. I have no reason to say no."

=== 2014: C-12 project and Say Concert ===
On March 6, 2014, a music video was posted on YouTube under the account name C-12 for the song " Abnormally Normal", a song with heavy EDM influences. With all credits under the name C-12, netizens were left to guess who the singer was. At the end of the month another music video was posted for "Chose a Way to Die" 揀一個死法. Both songs were noted for their darker themes compared to mainstream Cantopop. On April 22, a press conference was held, revealing the singer to be Kwan, along with producer Carl Wong and lyricist Chan Wing Him.

Kwan returned with the track "Resigned to Adversity" under her own name. The song was received well by radio stations, topping the RTHK Chart and reaching top 3 for the three other major stations. On November 20, Kwan released her third greatest hits album Say New + Best Selections. On November 28 and 29, Kwan headlined her Jade Kwan Concert 2014 (關心妍《說》演唱會) at the Kowloonbay International Trade & Exhibition Centre Star Hall.

=== 2015– 2019: Smile, Hiatus, Touching Moment Tour ===
In July 2015, the single "Sister Kwan" 關家姐 was released. The song talks about her view of the "My Sister got Fired" rumour after 11 years. Despite the song peaking only at number three on JSG Song Chart, the song won 2015 Jade Solid Gold Song. Kwan released "Bank of Life" 人生銀行; the single reached number one on Metro Radio and JSG. On October 31, 2015, Jade performed at Broadway Macau for the first time for her Jade Kwan Concert. On January 8, 2016, the single "A Yazidi Girl Like Me" was released. The song served as the theme song for the documentary Get Close to ISIS Victims. "Heartless Man", composed by singer-songwriter AGA was released in March 2016. She released the single "Smile" (lyrics and music by Cousin Fung and James Ng) on July 31, 2016, to commemorate the birth of her daughter. On August 10, 2016, the EP Smile was released digitally and as a 2-CD release.

In April 2019, it was announced that Kwan will be touring in China for the first time. The Touching Moment Concert tour kicked off on July 13 at the Zhongshan Memorial Hall in Guangzhou, China.

=== 2021: Comeback ===
On April 21, 2021, Kwan released "Soft" (腍), the first of three new singles planned for release in 2021. Kwan wrote and produced the second single (愛的告別式); it was released June 17.

== Personal life ==
On October 24, 2009, Kwan married long-time boyfriend Jonas Yeung in Bali. They announced the birth of their daughter, Jovia, on July 23, 2016, via social media.

Kwan is a Christian, and has been active in attending evangelical events.

== Philanthropic work ==
Kwan headlined benefit concert Shining as Star "妍"亮生命音樂佈道會 at the Queen Elizabeth Stadium from September 10–12, 2009, fundraising for Christian Zheng Sheng College, a school for helping young drug offenders.

== Discography ==
=== Studio albums ===
- Jade-1 (2002-07-03)
- Jade-1 Special Edition (2002-09-13)
- Jade-2 (2002-12-20)
- Jade-2 Special Edition (2003-01-17)
- Jade-3 (2003-04-16)
- Jade-3 Powerful Pack (2003-06-20)
- Jade Forward (2003-11-26)
- The 5th Element (2005-01-07)
- Jade Loves... (2006-05-03)
- Lost & Found (2007-07-20)
- 最愛 Jade.i (2008-05-28)
- 妍亮 Shine (2009-09-10)
- A New Beginning (2010-10-11)
- Still 仍然 (2012-01-20)
- Pause (2012-10-12)
- Emergence (2021-12-17)

=== Extended plays ===
- Still 仍然
- C-12
- Smile

=== Compilation albums ===
- Secret Garden 秘密花園
- Jade Birthday Kit
- Say New + Best Selections

=== Live & MV albums ===
- "心愛、心妍 (Love Jade) Karaoke" VCD & DVD (2003-8-29)
- "Jade I Am Ready Concert 2004" CD (2004-3-19)
- "Jade I Am Ready Concert 2004" VCD & DVD (2004-4-17)
- Jade Kwan Concert 2014
