= Twins (group) =

Hong Kong Cantopop duo

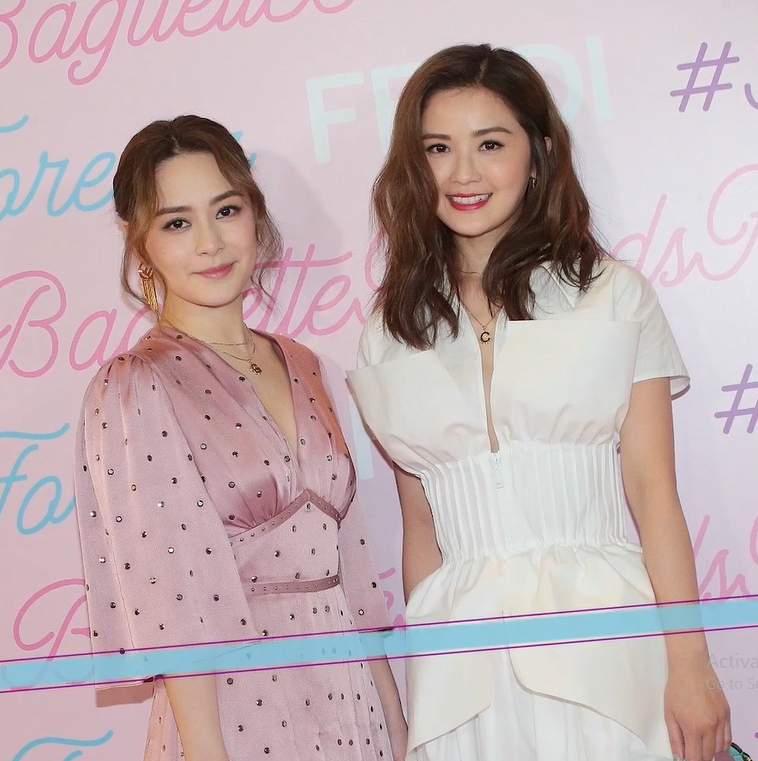
- Gillian Chung (left) and Charlene Choi (right) in 2019

Background information
- Origin: Hong Kong
- Genres: Cantopop; Mandopop; teen pop; bubblegum pop; new wave; indie pop
- Years active: 2001–2008, 2010–present
- Label: Emperor Entertainment Group
- Members: Charlene Choi; Gillian Chung
- Website: Twins EEG HK Official Site
- Awards: – Favorite Artist, Hong Kong; 2006

Twins is a Hong Kong pop duo formed in 2001 by Emperor Entertainment Group (EEG) and composed of Charlene Choi and Gillian Chung.

Since 2001, the group has released sixteen studio albums (twelve in Cantonese and four in Mandarin), three extended plays, five compilation albums and four live albums. In February 2008, Twins temporarily separated following the Edison Chen photo scandal involving Chung. The group reformed two years later in 2010.

== History ==
=== 2001–2003: Debut and first albums ===
Gillian Chung had also worked as a part-time model during one of her summer vacations in Hong Kong. Similar to her erstwhile partner, Charlene Choi was also a part-time model who had appeared in several advertisements. She became famous after her participation in the Radio Television Hong Kong (RTHK) television program Y2K. Both caught the attention of EEG manager Mani Fok (霍汶希). They subsequently auditioned for and later formed the duo known as "Twins".

Twins signed to Emperor Entertainment Group and were formed on 18 May 2001. According to Mani Fok, EEG's plan for Twins was to emulate the success of the Japanese duo KinKi Kids. In August 2001, they released their debut extended play Twins (AVEP) with hit single "Open Love, Secret Love, Tutoring Institute". This EP contained 3 music videos and 6 songs. As part of album promotions, Twins collaborated with MSN to make personal pages and web games. In addition, EEG bundled gifts and coupons with the EP, so that teenage album owners got more value from their purchase by receiving things like hair care products and vouchers for dance courses. It went platinum in its first week of selling. In November, Twins released their second EP Twins' Love, which contained 8 songs and 1 music video for the lead single, "Slam Drunking Love".

In January 2002, Twins released their third EP Twins. The EP contained one CD with five new songs, and a VCD, with 2 music videos. Since it was near Chinese New Year, the single "Ma Bao 668" was a greeting song for Chinese New Year. In May 2002, Twins finally released their debut album Our Souvenir with two discs. Disc one, CD contained 10 tracks with single "Er Ren Shi Jie Bei". Disc two was a VCD, with two music videos. Their debut album (just like a debut EP) was a great success. In August 2002, Twins released second album Amazing Album, consisted of two discs, CD with 11 songs, and a DVD with three videos. In 2002, Twins had their first concert ever, and three more in 2003 (which were held in Guangzhou).

Between 2001 and 2003, the duo received a total of 72 total awards. By 2003, they have received a large number of awards from the four major Hong Kong media organizations of RTHK, Commercial Radio Hong Kong, Metro Radio and TVB. In April 2003, they released third album, Touch of Love. It contained two discs, CD and DVD. Two months later, in June 2003, the second version of the album was released with a new single and its music video "Bian Bian Bian". The song was theme for their movie The Twins Effect and sung by Twins and Jackie Chan. With the brand new look, Twins released 1 disc 10 track fourth album named Evolution in September 2003.

=== 2004–2005: Continued success with Cantonese releases, Singing in the Twins Wonderland albums and Mandarin debut ===
In 2004, Twins had released four volumes of their children albums Singing in the Twins Wonderland, which were released for little children and it contained English nursery rhymes and stories. In January 2004, Twins released fifth studio album Magic, consisted of eleven songs. It was called Magic to emphasis their new musical style and the theme of the album. The Twins' Girl Power was the Olympic-themed album released in June 2004. It came in a special edition package. Included are: Six mini posters measuring 15" x 20" Twins Effect 2 beverage coaster Lucky draw scratch-and-win card for the music VCD. Similar to their previous albums, this album was larger than usual, using a large cardboard book-like package to carry the AVCD and posters. There were six different colored fabric bands wrapped around the package. Included is the theme song for Twins Effect II, (Love Is Invincible, seventh track).

In early 2005, Twins released their debut Mandarin album Trainee Cupid. In June 2005, one year after the last Cantopop album, Twins released their sixth studio album Samba with the singles "Samba Queen" and "Pink Guitar". Their seventh studio album The Missing Piece, was released in December 2005, after their album 36 Stratagems. They made a popular concert with the same name where they hugged each other and released a live/video album "Twins: The Missing Piece Concert".

In December 2005, a rumor mentioned the splitting of the two singers. However, they attended the May 2006 MTV Asia Awards in Thailand together. They were nominated for and won the Hong Kong Favorite Artist Award.

=== 2006–2009: Final albums, touring and disbandment ===
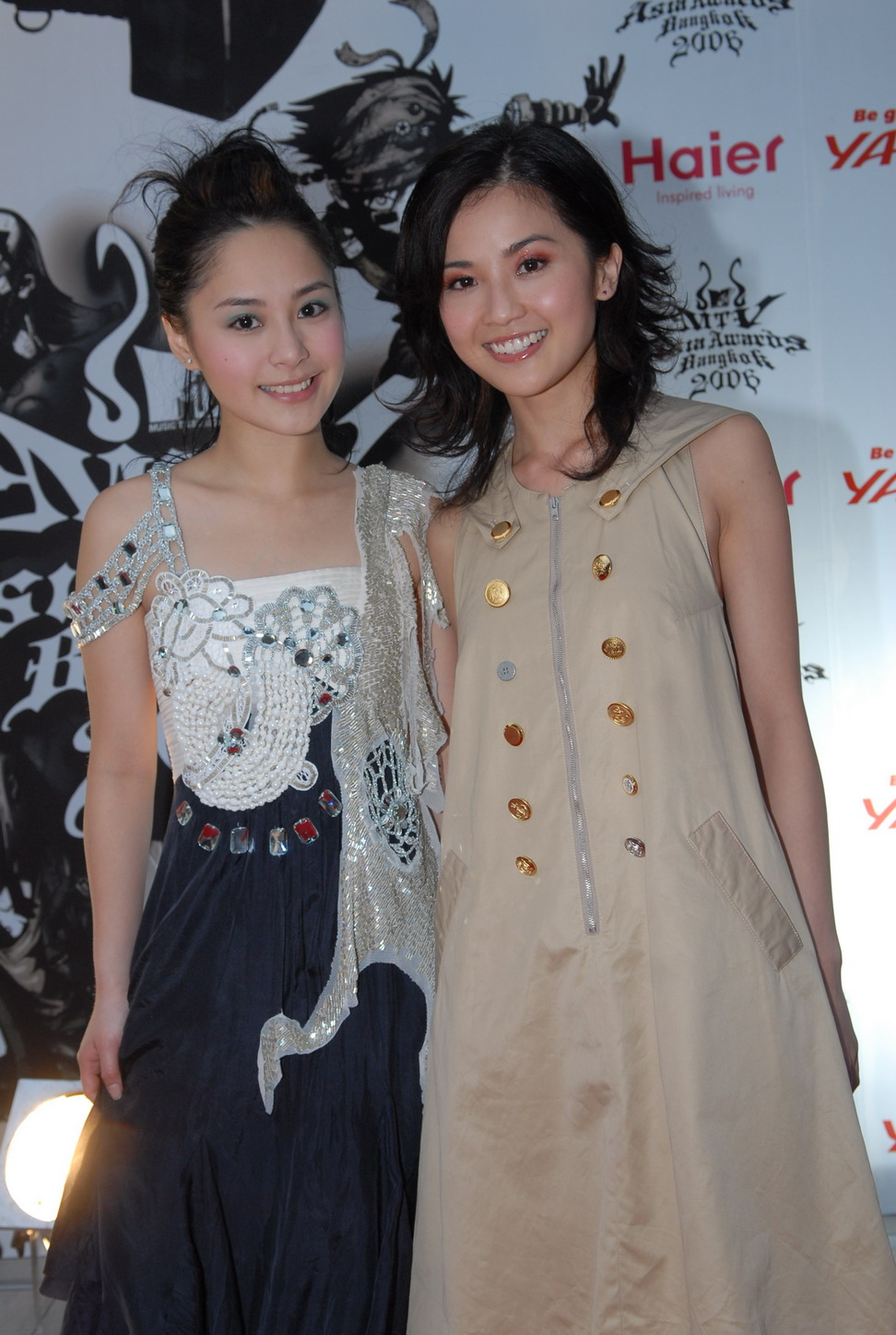
Twins in 2006

In June 2006, they released their second mandarin album Around the World with 80 Dollars which was a great success. Tracks "One Time Not Twice" and "I Really Want to Love Him" were nominated, and album Around the World with 80 Dollars won Top 10 Gold Songs at the Hong Kong TVB8 Awards, presented by television station TVB8, in 2006. The eighth album Ho Hoo Tan was released in September 2006. It consisted of a CD and a DVD with music videos. At the 2006 Hong Kong Entertainment Awards ceremony Choi tearfully acknowledged that there have been criticisms of the Twins' singing abilities and that she hoped that they could better improve in the coming year.

In February 2007, they celebrated their sixth year together in the Hong Kong music industry. They released a special Sixth Anniversary New + Best Selection CD/DVD. In September of the same year, Twins embarked on a multi-city North American concert tour, with special guests Sun Boy'Z. International stops included San Francisco, Toronto, and Atlantic City. It was their first time performing on a major tour across several North American cities. In 2007, Twins released their ninth studio album Twins Party. The album was a success. It was released in three versions: Twins version, Gillian solo version and Charlene solo version.

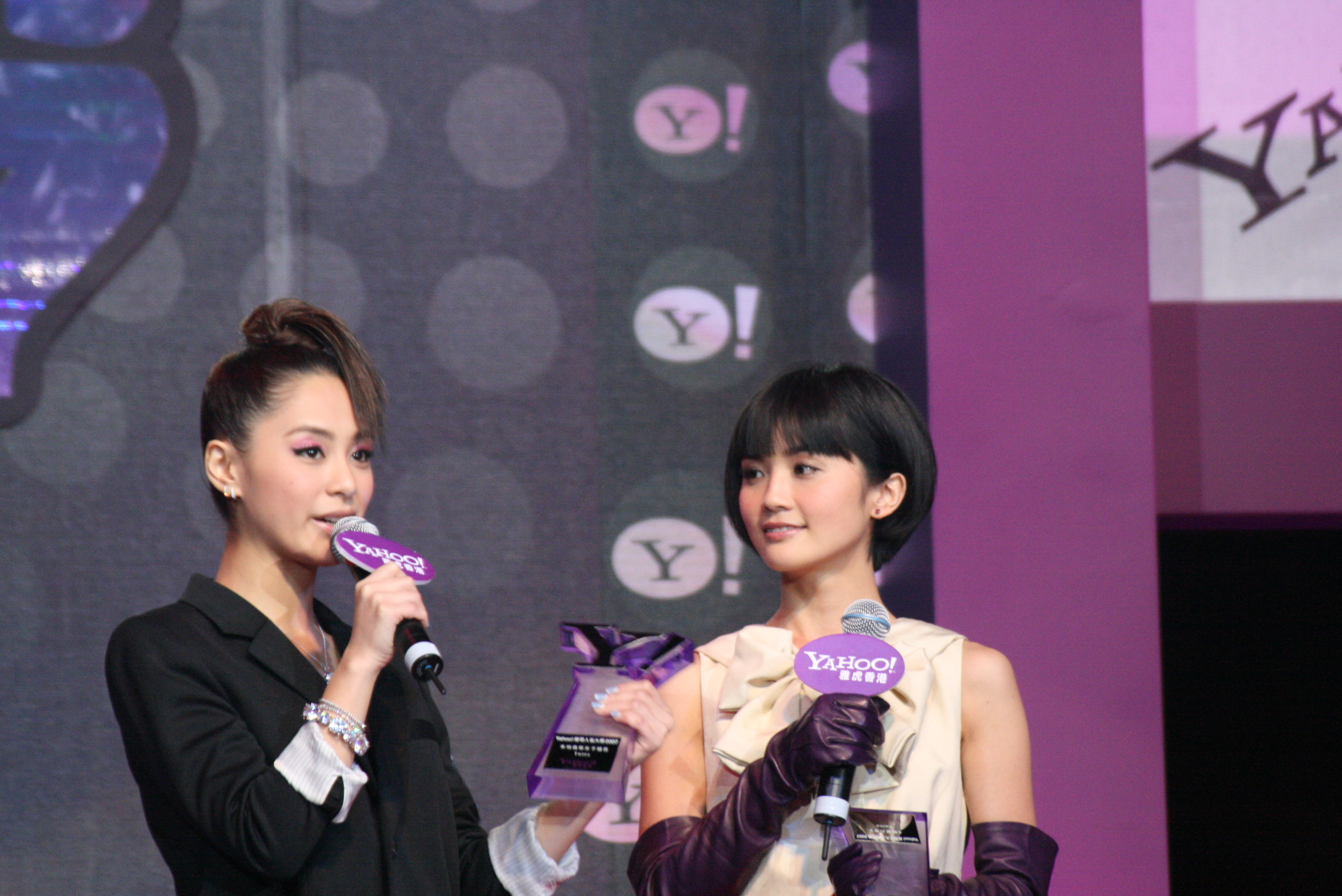
Twins in 2007

In early January 2008, Twins won two major awards at the 2007 Jade Solid Gold Top 10. They earned the most popular group award as well as the most popular Asia Pacific region female artist award. That year, Twins released their third Mandarin and final album before their hiatus, titled Twins Language. The group was dragged into the fray when Gillian was involved in the Edison Chen photo scandal. Her private images were among those which found their way onto the internet at the end of February 2008. With Gillian deciding to duck out of the public eye, Twins announced its "temporary dissolution" in July 2008. Charlene said she was highly optimistic that they would reunite some day in the future.

On 16 January 2009, during a TVB interview on My 2008 (我的2008), Choi talked about how she handled the media. During the 31st RTHK Top 10 Gold Songs Awards hosted in January 2009, Choi said Twins would return.

=== 2010–2016: Reunion, 3650, 2 Be Free and #LOL ===
Two years after the split, many wondered whether Twins had become a myth. In February 2010, Charlene Choi talked to the media about her experience in going solo. She summed up the experience by describing the name of her song "Two without one" (二缺一). She said that Twins was a symbol for their generation, and that they would never break up.

On the night of 27 February 2010 the "EEG 10th anniversary concert" was held at The Venetian Macao luxury hotel. A number of singers were present including EEG and non-EEG representatives. Some notables include Joey Yung, Nicholas Tse, Leo Ku, Vincy Chan, William Chan, Yumiko Cheng, Anthony Wong and many more. Gillian Chung and Charlene Choi appeared on stage together for the first time in two years to do a small performance for the anniversary concert. They sang (風箏與風), (下一站天后), (女校男生), (飲歌), (戀愛大過天) and (人人彈起).

A few days later on 3 March, Twins appeared in public at the Harbour plaza after parading around in a purple Porsche. A public announcement was made that Twins would reunite to perform in a three-day "Nokia Twins 2010 concert" from 16 to 18 April at the Hong Kong Coliseum in Hung Hom. The last time they performed at the same stage was four years previously.

In 2011, Twins released their comeback Mandarin album 3650. They released it as a celebration of 10th anniversary of their first project. The album had many covers, which were their photos (like "Our Souvenir" album cover) that were re-taken in 2011. In March 2012, Twins released their new, twelfth studio album titled 2 Be Free. Album contained one disc with ten new songs and a DVD with 3 new music videos.

After their album 2 Be Free was released, Chung and Choi focused on their solo careers again. Chung released two studio albums Vernicia Flower (2013) and Wholly Love (2014). Choi also released albums Montage (2012) and Blooming (2013). However, they reunited at 2015 Emperor Group Annual Celebration & Emperor Entertainment Group 15th Anniversary Ceremony on 1 February 2015 in Beijing, China. Twins performed in the Hong Kong Coliseum on the last day of 2015, as well as the first day of 2016 until 4 January. Their last performance was said to be filmed for their upcoming concert DVD and it lasted for 3.5 hours where their last encore was a full hour.

== Discography ==
Cantonese studio albums

- Our Souvenir (2002)
- Amazing Album (2002)
- Touch of Love (2003)
- Evolution (2003)
- Magic (2004)
- Girl Power (2004)
- Samba (2005)
- 36 Stratagems (2005)
- The Missing Piece (2005)
- Ho Hoo Tan (2006)
- Twins Party (2007)
- 2 Be Free (2012)

Mandarin studio albums

- Trainee Cupid (2005)
- Around the World with 80 Dollars (2006)
- Twins Language (2008)
- 3650 (2011)

== Filmography ==
Featuring both Charlene and Gillian:

Year	Title	Role	Notes
2002	Summer Breeze of Love 這個夏天有異性	Kammy Chung Lai-san (Gillian), Choi Kei (Charlene)	Acting debut
2002	The Monkey King:Quest for the Sultra 齊天大聖孫悟空	紫薇仙子 (Gillian), 紫蘭仙子 (Charlene)	
2002	Just One Look 一碌蔗	Decimator / Ghost girl (Gillian), Nam (Charlene)	
2003	The Twins Effect 千機變	Gypsy (Gillian), Helen (Charlene)	
2003	The Death Curse 古宅心慌慌	Linda Ting (Gillian), Nancy Ting (Charlene)	
2004	Fantasia 鬼馬狂想曲	Chopstick Sisters	
2004	Protégé de la Rose Noire 見習黑玫瑰	Gillian Lu (Gillian), Sandy (Charlene)	
2004	New Police Story 新警察故事	Sa Sa (Charlene)	
2004	Love on the Rocks 戀情告急	Mandy (Gillian), Crystal Au-yeung Sum-kit (Charlene)	
2004	The Twins Effect II 千機變II之花都大戰	Blue Bird (Gillian), Spring (Charlene)	Second and final The Twins Effect sequel
2004	6 AM 大無謂	(themselves)	Cameo role
2004	Kung Fu Soccer 功夫足球		Television series
2005	House of Fury 精武家庭	Natalie Yue (Gillian), Ella (Charlene)	
2005	Bug Me Not! 蟲不知	Auntie (Gillian), Sasako (Sasha) (Charlene)	
2007	Twins Mission 雙子神偷	Pearl (Gillian), Jade (Charlene)	Alternate title Let's Steal Together
2007	Naraka 19 地獄第19層	Rain (Gillian), Wendy (Charlene)	Final movie role

== Concerts ==
- 13–15 September 2002 | Ichiban Amazing Show (Twins Ichiban 興奮演唱會)
- 18–19 January 2003 | Matsunichi Twins Guangzhou Amazing Show (松日Twins廣州興奮演唱會)
- 25 June 2003 | Tou Hao Ren Wu Chang Hao Music Concert (頭號人物唱好音樂會)
- 2 August 2003 | Netvigator NETCash Pop-up Concert ( 網上行叱吒樂壇Pop-Up音樂會)
- 31 December 2003 – 4 January 2004 | Matsunichi Twins 04 Concert (Twins 04 好玩演唱會)
- 3 June 2005 | Starlight Amusement Park Concert (Australia)
- 4–7 January 2006 | Twins Star Mobile Incomparable Concert (Twins 星Mobile 一時無兩演唱會)
- 18–19 August 2006 | Twins Concert in Genting Malaysia
- 15 September 2007 | Twins Concert in Cow Palace, San Francisco/Daly City
- 18 September 2007 | Twins Concert in Toronto at Casino Rama (我們相愛6年)
- 22–23 September 2007 | Twins Sixth Anniversary World Tour 2007 [Atlantic City] (Twins 我們相愛6年 環遊世界[大西洋城]演唱會)
- 16–18 April 2010 | Nokia Twins Everyone Bounce Concert (Nokia 舞樂作動 Twins 人人彈起演唱會)
- 13 November 2010 | Twins Everyone Bounce Concert Live in Macau (Twins 人人彈起 Concert Live in Macau)
- 31 December 2015 – 4 January 2016 | Twins #LOL #Live in HK Concert
- 21–23, 25–29 January 2024; 1–6 February 2024 | Twins Spirit Since 2001 Live in Hong Kong

== Photo albums ==
- August 2001 Twins Love the Colorful Travel 112 pages
- November 2001 Twins 1+1 Photo Album 96 pages
- August 2003 Twins Love Hong Kong 112 pages
- December 2004 Twins Hold Hands Hong Kong 112 pages

== See also ==
- Gillian Chung
- Charlene Choi
- Cantopop
- Mandopop
