= 1990 Jade Solid Gold Best Ten Music Awards Presentation =

Hong Kong music awards ceremony

The 1990 Jade Solid Gold Best Ten Music Awards Presentation (Chinese: 1990年度十大勁歌金曲頒獎典禮) was held in January 1991. It is part of the Jade Solid Gold Best Ten Music Awards Presentation series held in Hong Kong.

== Top 10 song awards ==
The top 10 songs (十大勁歌金曲) of 1990 are as follows.

| Song name in Chinese | Artist |
|---|---|
| 失戀 | Grasshopper (Band members: Calvin Choy, Remus Choy, Edmond So) |
| 再會了 | Andy Lau |
| 前塵 | Sandy Lam |
| 相逢何必曾相識 | Ram Chiang, Rita Carpio |
| 愛恨纏綿 | Shirley Kwan |
| 祗願一生愛一人 | Jacky Cheung |
| 焚心以火 | Sally Yeh |
| 眷戀 | Hacken Lee |
| 光輝歲月 | Beyond (Band members: Wong Ka Kui, Wong Ka Keung, Paul Wong Koon Chung, Yip Sai Wing) |
| 心仍是冷 | Anita Mui, Anthony Lun |

== Additional awards ==
| Award | Song name (if available for award) | Recipient(s) |
|---|---|---|
The Most Popular Mandarin Song Award (最受歡迎國語歌曲獎)
| Gold award | 你知道我在等你嗎 | Jeremy Chang (張洪量) |
| Silver award | 耶利亞女郎 | Angus Tung |
| Bronze award | 特別的愛給特別的你 | Sky Wu (伍思凱) |
| The Best Composition Award (最佳作曲獎) | 焚心以火 | Music composers: Joseph Koo, Wong Jim; Performed by: Sally Yeh |
| The Best Lyric Award (最佳填詞獎) | 光輝歲月 | Lyrics by: Wong Ka Kui; Performed by: Beyond (Band members: Wong Ka Kui, Wong Ka Keung, Paul Wong Koon Chung, Yip Sai Wing) |
| The Best Music Arrangement Award (最佳編曲獎) | 焚心以火 | Music Arrangement by: Joseph Koo; Performed by Sally Yeh |
| The Best Song Producer Award (最佳歌曲監製獎) | 焚心以火 | Music producer: Wong Jim; Performed by: Sally Yeh |
The Most Popular New Artist Award (最受歡迎新人獎)
| Gold award | --- | Leon Lai |
| Silver award | --- | Tsang Hong Sang (曾航生) |
| Bronze award | --- | May Ng (吳婉芳) |
| The Best Music Video Award (最佳音樂錄影帶獎) | 樂與悲 | Director: Yeung wai-yip (楊偉業); Performed by: Tai Chi (太極) (Band members: Albert Lui, Patrick Lui, Joey Tang, Ernest Lau, Edde Sing, Ricky Chu, Gary Tong) |
| The Best Music Video Performance Award (最佳音樂錄影帶演出獎) | Electric Girl | Norman Cheung (張立基) |
| The Best Music Video Performance Award (最佳音樂錄影帶演出獎) | 蜘蛛女之吻 | Grasshopper (Band members: Calvin Choy, Remus Choy, Edmond So) |
| The Most Popular Male Artist Award (最受歡迎男歌星獎) | --- | Andy Lau |
| The Most Popular Female Artist Award (最受歡迎女歌星獎) | --- | Sally Yeh |
| Gold Song Gold Award (金曲金獎) | 焚心以火 | Sally Yeh |
