= 1989 Jade Solid Gold Best Ten Music Awards Presentation =

Hong Kong music awards ceremony

The 1989 Jade Solid Gold Best Ten Music Awards Presentation (Chinese: 1989年度十大勁歌金曲頒獎典禮) was held in January 1990 at The Hong Kong Academy for Performing Arts. It is part of the Jade Solid Gold Best Ten Music Awards Presentation series held in Hong Kong.

== Top 10 song awards ==
The top 10 songs (十大勁歌金曲) of 1989 are as follows.

| Song name in Chinese | Artist(s) |
|---|---|
| 夕陽之歌 | Anita Mui |
| 一生不變 | Hacken Lee |
| 誰明浪子心 | Dave Wong |
| 一生何求 | Danny Chan |
| 難得有情人 | Shirley Kwan |
| 真的愛你 | Beyond (Band members: Wong Ka Kui, Wong Ka Keung, Paul Wong Koon Chung, Yip Sai Wing) |
| 依然 | Sandy Lam |
| 夕陽醉了 | Jacky Cheung |
| 千千闕歌 | Priscilla Chan |
| 由零開始 | Leslie Cheung |

== Additional awards ==
| Award | Song name (if available for award) | Recipient(s) |
|---|---|---|
| The Best Composition Award (最佳作曲獎) | 留住我吧! | Tai Chi (Band members: Albert Lui, Patrick Lui, Joey Tang, Ernest Lau, Edde Sing, Ricky Chu, Gary Tong) |
| The Best Lyric Award (最佳填詞獎) | 一生何求 | Lyrics by: Pun Wai Yun (潘偉源); Performed by: Danny Chan |
| The Best Music Arrangement Award (最佳編曲獎) | 燒 | Music Arrangement by: Anthony Lun; Performed by: Sandy Lam |
| The Best Song Producer Award (最佳歌曲監製獎) | 千千闕歌 | Producers: Priscilla Chan, Au Ding Juk (歐丁玉), Chan Wing Ming (陳永明); Performed by: Priscilla Chan |
| The Most Popular New Artist Award (最受歡迎新人獎) | --- | Dave Wong |
| The Most Popular New Artist Award (最受歡迎新人獎) | --- | Shirley Kwan |
| The Best Music Video Award (最佳音樂錄影帶獎) | 夜半一點鐘 | Director: Yeung Wai Yip (楊偉業); Performed by: Alex To |
| The Most Popular Male Artist Award (最受歡迎男歌星獎) | --- | Leslie Cheung |
| The Most Popular Female Artist Award (最受歡迎女歌星獎) | --- | Anita Mui |
| Gold Song Gold Award (金曲金獎) | 夕陽之歌 | Anita Mui |
