= 1988 Jade Solid Gold Best Ten Music Awards Presentation =

Hong Kong music awards ceremony

The 1988 Jade Solid Gold Best Ten Music Awards Presentation (Chinese: 1988年度十大勁歌金曲頒獎典禮) was held in January 1989. It is part of the Jade Solid Gold Best Ten Music Awards Presentation series held in Hong Kong.

== Top 10 song awards ==
The top 10 songs (十大勁歌金曲) of 1988 are as follows.

Song name in Chinese	Artist(s)
貼身	Leslie Cheung
Stand By Me	Anita Mui
祝福	Sally Yeh
真的漢子	George Lam
傻女	Priscilla Chan
大地	Beyond (Band members: Wong Ka Kui, Paul Wong Koon Chung, Steve Wong Ka Keung, Yip Sai Wing)
胭脂扣	Anita Mui
煙雨淒迷	Danny Chan
沉默是金	Leslie Cheung, Samuel Hui
千載不變	The Wynners (Band members: Alan Tam, Kenny Bee, Bennett Pang, Danny Yip, Anthony Chan)

== Additional awards ==
Award	Song name (if available for award)	Recipient(s)
The Best Composition Award (最佳作曲獎)	但願人長久	Lowell Lo
The Best Lyric Award (最佳填詞獎)	祝福	Lyrics by: Pun Wai Yun (潘偉源); Performed by Sally Yeh
The Best Music Arrangement Award (最佳編曲獎)	真愛又如何	Music Arrangement by: Joseph Koo; Performed by: Paula Tsui
The Best Song Producer Award (最佳歌曲監製獎)	祝福	Producers: Sally Yeh, Zung Deng Yat (鍾定一), Wong Pak Man (黃柏文), George Lam; Performed by: Sally Yeh
The Most Popular New Artist Award (最受歡迎新人獎)	---	Grasshopper (Band members: Calvin Choy, Remus Choy, Edmond So)
The Best Music Video Performance Award (最佳音樂錄影帶獎)	夢裡共醉	Director: Yeung Wai Yip (楊偉業); Performed by Anita Mui
The Most Popular Male Artist Award (最受歡迎男歌星獎)	---	Leslie Cheung
The Most Popular Female Artist Award (最受歡迎女歌星獎)	---	Anita Mui
Gold Song Gold Award (金曲金獎)	祝福	Sally Yeh
Jade Solid Gold Honour Award (勁歌金曲榮譽大獎)	---	The Wynners (Band members: Alan Tam, Kenny Bee, Bennett Pang, Danny Yip, Anthony Chan)
