= Two of a Kind (Hong Kong TV series) =

Hong Kong television series

- Official poster
- 淘氣雙子星
- Genre: Modern Drama, Teen, Romance
- Created by: Hong Kong Television Broadcasts Limited
- Starring: Hacken Lee; Paul Wong; Yu Sin Man; Cutie Mui; Steve Wong; Aaron Kwok; Paul Chun; Kiki Sheung
- Theme music composer: Wong Ka Kui
- Opening theme: Days Gone By (逝去日子) by Beyond
- Country of origin: Hong Kong
- Original language: Cantonese
- No. of episodes: 10

Production
- Producer: Mui Siu-ching
- Production location: Hong Kong
- Editor: Au Koon-ying
- Camera setup: Multi camera
- Running time: 45 minutes
- Production company: TVB

Original release
- Network: TVB Jade
- Release: 10 July – 21 July 1989

Two of a Kind
- Chinese: 淘氣雙子星
- Simplified Chinese: 淘气双子星
- Literal meaning: "Naughty Gemini"
Transcriptions
Standard Mandarin
- Hanyu Pinyin: Táo qì shuāng zǐ xīng
Yue: Cantonese
- Jyutping: tou4 hei3 soeng1 zi2 sing1

Two of a Kind (Chinese: 淘氣雙子星; Jyutping: tou4 hei3 soeng1 zi2 sing1; literally "Naughty Gemini") is a 1989 Hong Kong modern teen television drama created and produced by TVB, starring Hacken Lee, Paul Wong, Yu Sin Man, Cutie Mui, Steve Wong, Aaron Kwok, Paul Chun, Kiki Sheung as the main cast and was produced by popular TVB producer Mui Siu-ching. First original broadcast began on Hong Kong's Jade channel July 10 till July 21, 1989 every Monday through Friday during its 7:35 to 8:35 pm timeslot with a total of 10 episodes.

== Synopsis ==
Fed up with being mistreated by his new step-father and his mother not caring Cha Sing Yu (Hacken Lee) boards a plane from the U.S. and runs away to Hong Kong to look for his father. When he lands in Hong Kong he heads to his father's office only to find out his father is away on a business trip but he does run into his fraternal twin brother Cha Sing Chow (Paul Wong) at the office. Sing Yu follows Sing Chow and befriends him, Sing Yu is also able to talk Sing chow into taking him in that night. Sing Yu talks Sing Chow into having fun that night and the two get drunk.

Their dad comes home finding the both of them drunk and that Sing Yu has returned to Hong Kong alone. The next day Sing Yu registered for school where he meets the rest of Sing Chow's classmates. Everyone welcomes him except Sheung Yan Yin (Yu Sin-man), who had an unpleasant run in with Sing Yu the day before. She instantly becomes Sing Yu's enemies but Sing Chow also has a crush on her. Meanwhile, classmate Lee Sai Sai goes out of her way to help Sing Yu to adjust to life in Hong Kong since she has a crush on him.

As Sing Yu, Sing Chow and their friends transition from student to young adult life each face their own difficulty. Sing Yu must choose to follow his dreams of becoming a tennis player or continue his university studies. While Sing Chow comes to terms that Yan Yin does not have romantic feelings for him and must move on with his life.

== Cast ==
=== Students ===
- Hacken Lee as Cha Sing Yu (查星宇)
- Paul Wong as Cha Sing Chow (查星宙)
- Yu Sin-man as Sheung Yan Yin (常欣然)
- Cutie Mui as Lee Sai Sai (李西西)
- Steve Wong as Yeung Yau Chi (楊有智；nickname Dr. YY YY 博士)
- Aaron Kwok as Chui Yik (徐翊; nickname Dongguan Boy 東莞仔)
- Sarah Wong as Momoko To (桃芷美; To Chi May)
- Brian Wong as Yuen Siu Kau (袁小球)
- Timothy Wong Yik as Billy Cheung (張耀邦; Cheung Yiu Bong)

=== School faculty ===
- Law Kwok-wai as school principal (校長)
- Kiki Sheung as Sheung Yin Yin (常嫣然)
- Andy Tai as Ha Hin Yeung (夏顯揚)
- Wai Yee-yan as Miss Chan
- Lee Tim-sing as Chu Sir (朱Sir)

=== Parents ===
- Paul Chun as Charles Cha (查萬里; Cha Man Lei)
- Amy Wu as Lydia Chung (鍾迪雅; Chung Dik Nga)
- Wong Chun as Lee King (李勁)

=== Extended cast ===
- Constance Cheng as Siu Yuen (小阮)
- Candy Wong
- Ng Shui-ting
- Mak Chi-wan
- Suen Kwai-hing
- Kit Chan
- Gordon Lam
- Ying Man-woo
- Lee Wei-ming
- Lily Liew
- Evergreen Mak

== Soundtrack ==
- Days Gone By (逝去日子) by Beyond
- Walk with You (與妳共行) by Beyond
- Youthful Dreams (夢少年) by Hacken Lee
