= Escape from Hong Kong Island =

2004 Hong Kong film by Simon Lui

Escape from Hong Kong Island (Mak dau sin sang)
- Directed by: Simon Lui
- Written by: Simon Lui
- Starring: Jordan Chan; Cheung Tat-ming; Coco Chiang; Wayne Lai; Tats Lau
- Release date: 23 September 2004
- Country: Hong Kong
- Language: Cantonese

Escape from Hong Kong Island (墨斗先生) is a 2004 black comedy film made in Hong Kong, directed by Simon Lui, and starring Jordan Chan.

== Synopsis ==
Jordan Chan plays Raymond Mak, a skilled investment consultant working on Hong Kong island, and this talent has provided Raymond with an abundant lifestyle. However, he has also cultivated an arrogant attitude and treats people with disrespect.

At the start of the day, Raymond finds out to the glee of his manager and co-workers that he had been fired for embezzlement and costing too much upkeep for the company. He demands an explanation, but his supervisor cites his abusive behavior towards him and his co-workers. The termination of his job does not faze Raymond, and he makes a phone call to a rival investment, who has been trying to for years to convince Raymond to defect to them. However, he needs Raymond to cross the harbor to Kowloon to sign on before the CEO leaves on a business trip at 5:00 pm.

After he leaves his former employer, he is robbed by someone who he recognizes from earlier. He is robbed of his wallet, money, and other items. He tries to report the robbery at the police station but takes up a lot of time trying to explain the robbery. The lost property police officer attempts to be helpful and recommends going to the Hong Kong Immigration office to get a new ID card. Upon arriving, he sees that the line is too long and abandons the idea.

Raymond gets in touch with a colleague at his bank for some immediate cash but the banker cannot citing the bank regulations. He tries to contact friends on getting some quick cash, but many do not want to deal with him (from his attitude and behavior). He remembers several people who he has offended, thinking that they will not help. He throws his books at the ground, but it is caught by the helpful police officer. He talks with him about not littering but also recommends going back to the Immigration office.

He contacts his former girlfriend, but she is upset over an incident where he cheated on her (and was caught at a luxury store). She explains that his behaviors and treatment of his friends has earned him a bad reputation. Angry, she leaves him at the restaurant, but does leave him some money. At the restaurant, he bumps into an executive that he can suck up to, and ends up paying for his meal (which is expensive).

He calls the rival company several times to explain that he is on his way, but will be a little late. He even tries to ask a woman for her phone so that he can use it, but the woman is irritated by this. The helpful police officer shows up again to settle incident, and tries to be helpful. But warns Raymond that he cannot cause such disrespectful disturbances.

Broke and no way to get to Kowloon, he tries numerous ways to earn some money to travel across the harbor. He tries to cash in coupons at a video store, attempts to go to a sperm donation center, and begging for change. He meets a blind beggar, who he had seen earlier, and tries to rob him. But the beggar (who is not actually blind) catches him. They sit together and they both explain their stories, and relate to each other. The beggar gives him some friendly advice on fate, and both wish each other well.

He tries to see his mother for money, but the nurse explains that she has had Alzheimer's for about 9 months. She is very irritated with Raymond that he has not seen in at all. He finds his sister (Wong Chun-Chun) and his brother. His brother wants nothing to do with him. His sister is very friendly to him, but once Raymond see how much they are struggling, he does not ask her for anything.

Again he tries to get some money to cross the harbor by playing an elderly men at chess in the park. But he loses, and the elderly group beats him up for not paying them. Hopeless and regretful, he tries to actually swim the harbor, pledging to be a better person if he succeeds. But is caught by the helpful officer. The Police Officer is yells at him for risking his life and risking another officer's life. He is also angry that he tried to help Raymond, but Raymond was too prideful to take help (referencing his suggestions of going to the Immigration Office). They take him in, but due to a large round up of people at the police station, they go to the police station in Kowloon.

At the station, the police officer shows takes Raymond to his office. There he asks if the man sitting next to him is familiar, since he was caught with Raymond's things. Raymond recognizes him as the man who stole his things, but does not have the heart to punish him. Raymond says the man is not the robber. The "robber" explains that he was in a similar situation to Raymond, and that he apologizes. Raymond accepts.

Several days later, Raymond tries to make amends to his friends and family. He tries to help his sister with employment. And he is friendly around the office, learning that there is more important and meaningful things in life.

== Cast and roles ==
- Jordan Chan - Raymond Mak
- Nelson Cheung - Waiter
- Cheung Tat-Ming - Raymond's Bro
- Coco Chiang - Candy Lo
- Jim Chim - Bank Employee
- Fung Li - Nurse
- Vincent Kok - Video Shop Owner
- Emily Kwan - Passenger on taxi
- Wayne Lai - Lost property Police Officer
- Tats Lau - Beggar
- Law Kar-ying - Raymond's superior
- Leung Wing-Chung - Sperm Bank Director
- Li Fung - Elderly home nurse, who despises Raymond for taking advantage from his mother, who suffered from Alzheimer's disease
- Monica Lo - Lucy
- Tin Kai Man - Buddhist Taxi Driver
- Chapman To - Policeman
- Wong Chun-Chun - Raymond's Sis
- Paul Wong - Mugger
- Wong Ka Keung - Bus Driver
- Yip Sai Wing - Raymond's colleague
- Natalie Tong - Raymond's colleague
