= Protest against MTR's musical instrument restrictions =

2015 Hong Kong protest

Musicians protest against MTR's luggage rules
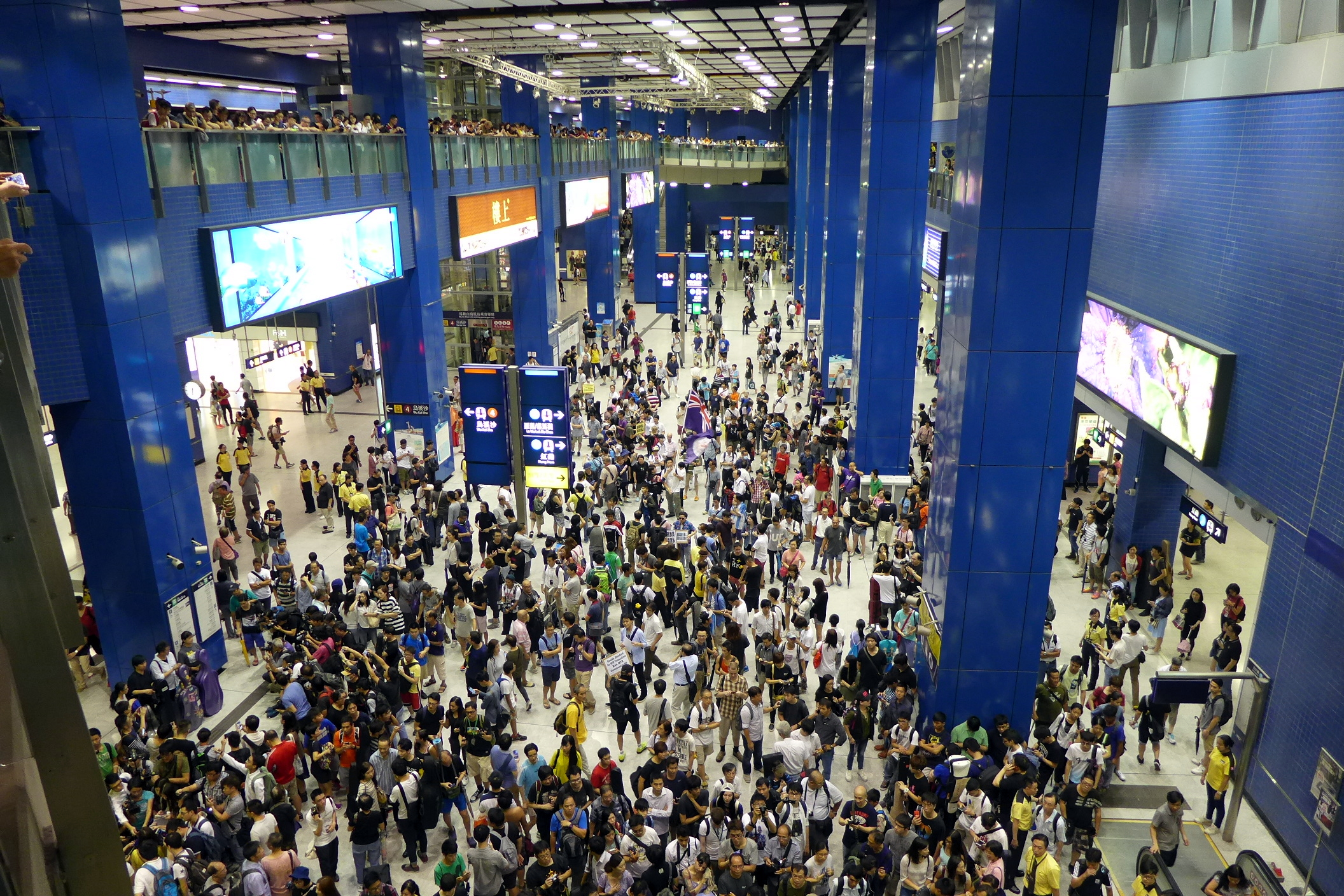
- Protesters gathered in the concourse of Tai Wai Station, with some picking up musical instruments to perform
- Date: 3 October 2015
- Location: Tai Wai station and Sha Tin station
- Goals: Protest MTR's ban on large musical instruments

Casualties
- Arrested: 1

On 3 October 2015, a protest was held at Tai Wai station and subsequently Sha Tin station in Hong Kong. The action was initiated online by Mavis Lung Man-wai (龍文慧), a yangqin teacher and musician, following controversy over the enforcement of Mass Transit Railway (MTR) regulations governing oversized luggage and musical instruments. The protest is also referred to by its original campaign title "Let's bring our musical instruments to take MTR" or its transliteration as "Call for the Public to Bring Large Musical Instruments on the East Rail Line" (Chinese: 號召各界攜帶大型樂器搭東鐵).

It focused on allegations that the MTR applied its luggage regulations selectively. Musicians and their supporters argued that students carrying large musical instruments, including cellos and guzhengs, were being prevented from using the railway, while parallel traders from mainland China carrying substantially larger quantities of goods were allegedly allowed. The campaign consequently became both a musicians' rights protest.

The protest contributed to a subsequent review of the MTR's luggage policy. On 27 October 2015, the MTR Corporation announced a four-month trial registration scheme allowing passengers to carry certain oversized musical instruments subject to larger dimensional limits. However, it would still ban guzhengs and double basses from entering.

== Background ==
At the time of the protest, MTR regulations generally limited passengers to luggage whose combined length, width and height did not exceed 170 cm, with no individual side exceeding 130 cm, and a maximum weight of 23 kg. Items exceeding the prescribed limits could be refused entry into the paid area of a station. The restrictions were presented by the MTR as measures intended to protect passenger safety and prevent oversized objects from obstructing station and train passages. Mr. Hung, a guzheng player of 20 years, said that before the 2007 merger of the two railways, the Kowloon–Canton Railway (KCR) had a formal procedure for carrying oversized items: passengers could pay an additional HK$20 for a staff-issued sticker. After he explained that his instrument was for personal use rather than sale, KCR waived the fee. MTR said the scheme was abolished in 2009. Comparing with other public transport operators in Hong Kong, MTR uniquely sets a specific length limit, while others generally regulate overall luggage volume. The MTR, Star Ferry and trams may fine violators; KMB and other franchised buses may refuse boarding. Minibuses have no explicit luggage limits.

On 15 September 2015, an image of a schoolgirl carrying a guzheng being stopped by MTR staff at Tai Wai station circulated widely online, sparking criticism of the MTR's alleged selective enforcement of its luggage rules. Critics contrasted the incident with photographs of parallel traders carrying oversized goods, including washing machines and large quantities of luggage, on MTR trains, arguing that the MTR was applying its regulations more strictly to ordinary passengers and musicians than to parallel traders carrying large commercial goods. The controversy also led to an online campaign, "MTR Over-Cooperation Movement", in which participants encouraged passengers to report other passengers carrying oversized luggage so that MTR staff would be compelled to apply the regulations consistently.

Another incident involved Calvin Ho Ka-yeung, a forth-year Hong Kong Baptist University music student, who carried a cello on the East Rail Line of MTR. In late September, Ho was stopped by MTR personnel and his cello case was measured. Reports stated that the case exceeded the 130-cm maximum length by approximately 4 cm. Ho was subsequently issued a warning concerning a possible fine of up to HK$2,000 and escorted out the station. However, without enough money to take a taxi, he re-entered the station through another entrance and boarded the Kwun Tong line. Richard Bamping, principal cellist of the Hong Kong Philharmonic Orchestra, criticized the treatment of musicians and called it "ridiculous". He also noted that rail systems in nearby international cities were more accommodating: JR East did not subject musical instruments to its general luggage-size restrictions, while Taipei Metro allowed passengers to apply for an exemption in advance. Laurent Perrin, associate principal cellist of the Hong Kong Sinfonietta, found the incident "hard to believe."

== Organisation ==
Mavis Lung Man-wai, a yangqin teacher, launched a Facebook campaign calling on musicians and members of the public to bring their large musical instruments to Tai Wai station. The campaign was initially framed primarily as an expression of solidarity among musicians and a demand that the MTR reconsider its treatment of large instruments. The event was planned at 6 pm on 3 October 2026, and its Facebook page got six thousand responses in just 6 hours. More than 3,500 people had indicated an interest in the Facebook campaign before the protest.

== Protests ==
=== Protest at Tai Wai station ===
Before 6 pm, street performer So Chun, who had previously been charged with obstruction for performing on the street, used red paint to write a protest message on the floor of Tai Wai Station concourse, accusing MTR of disrupting people’s livelihoods and suppressing the arts. MTR staff monitored the scene and later sent cleaners to remove the writing. Meanwhile, hundreds of protesters then arrived at Tai Wai station, including dozens of musicians carrying large musical instruments. Protesters held banners, "musical instruments are not parallel-traded goods", "MTR bullies the weak", The event also gathered a large crowd of by-standers.

At around 7 pm, several groups of musicians began performing at different parts of the station. Canadian bagpiper Patrick Brousseau, dressed in a kilt, became a focal point after playing Scottish tunes as well as the Descendants of the Dragon and Fengyang Flower Drum. Other musicians gathered to jam with guitars, cello and flutes, protesting what they saw as MTR’s unfair treatment of musicians compared with parallel traders.

At around 8 pm, musicians from different backgrounds performed and sang Beyond's Boundless Oceans Vast Skies, as well as other popular Cantopop songs. By 8 pm, most participants had left.

Members of localist groups were also present, causing the event to gradually expand from a music-community action into a broader anti-MTR protest. Localist protesters repeatedly confronted MTR staff, surrounding them and questioning whether the company had taken bribes to overlook parallel traders. Some shouted insults such as “MTR staff are dogs” or the milder “MTR is shameful,” while staff remained calm. Profanities were heard repeatedly, while some protesters displayed yellow umbrellas and waved the British Hong Kong flag.

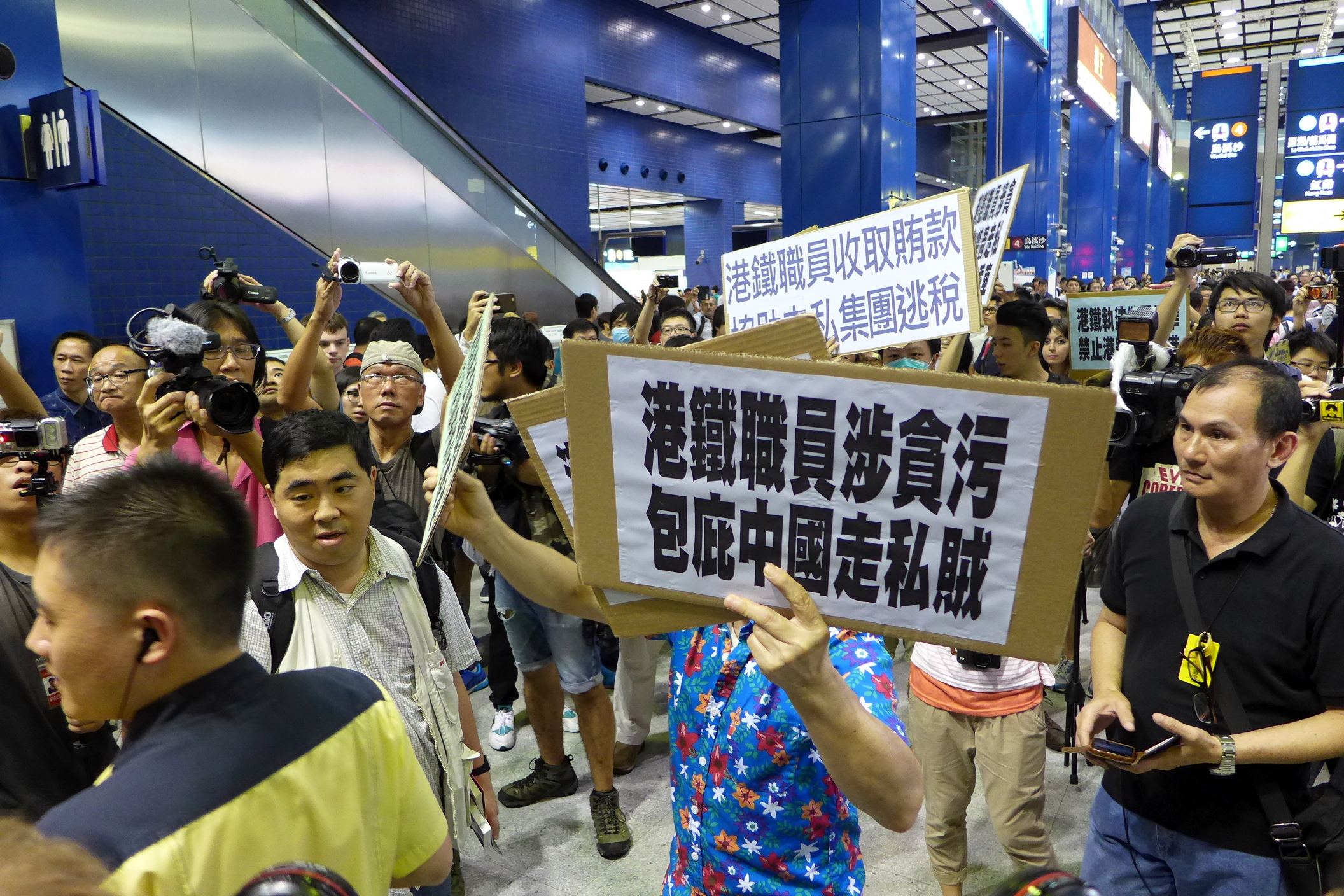
Protesters carried signs to expressing their dissatisfaction with MTR's unfair treatment

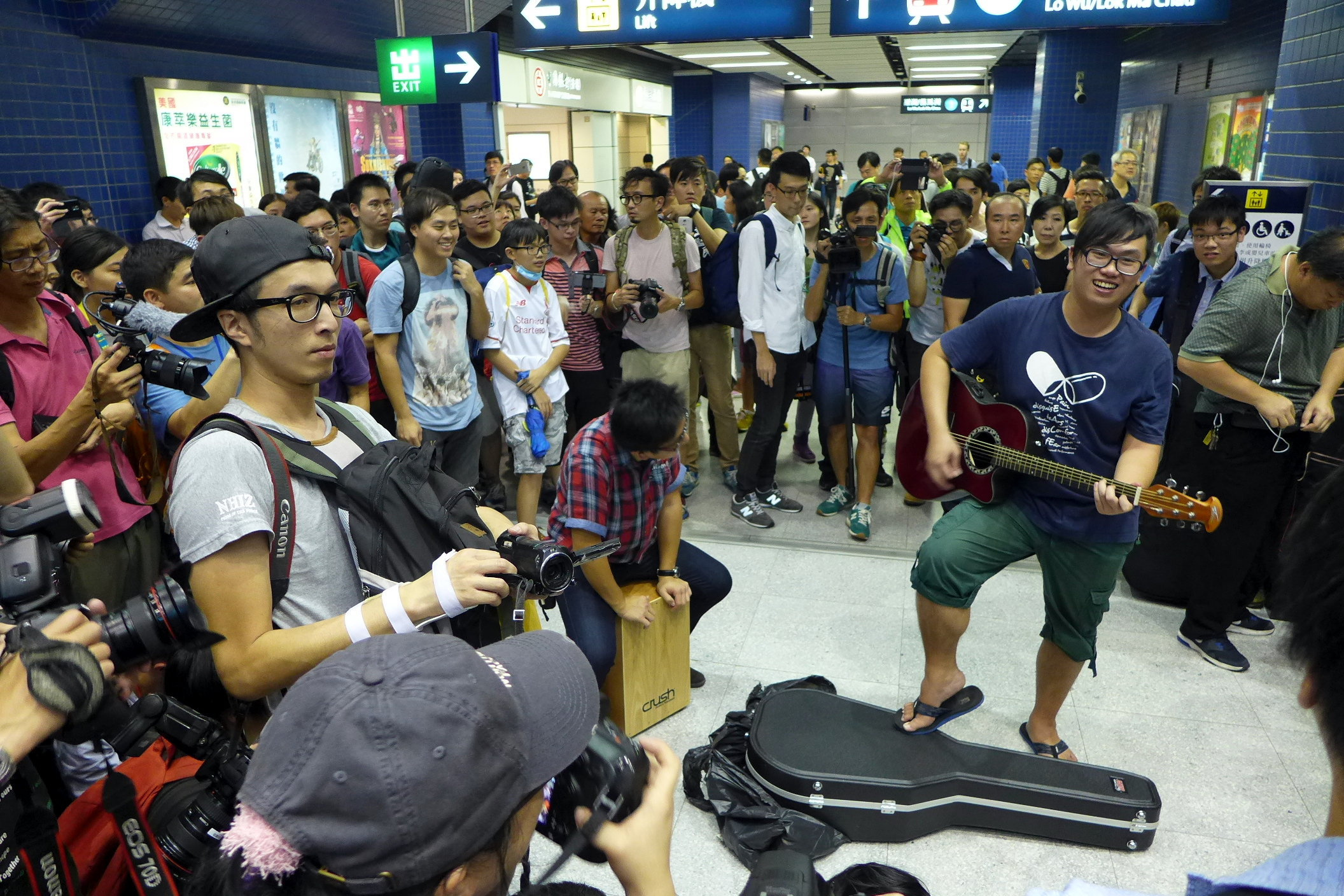
At around 7 pm, musicians began performing

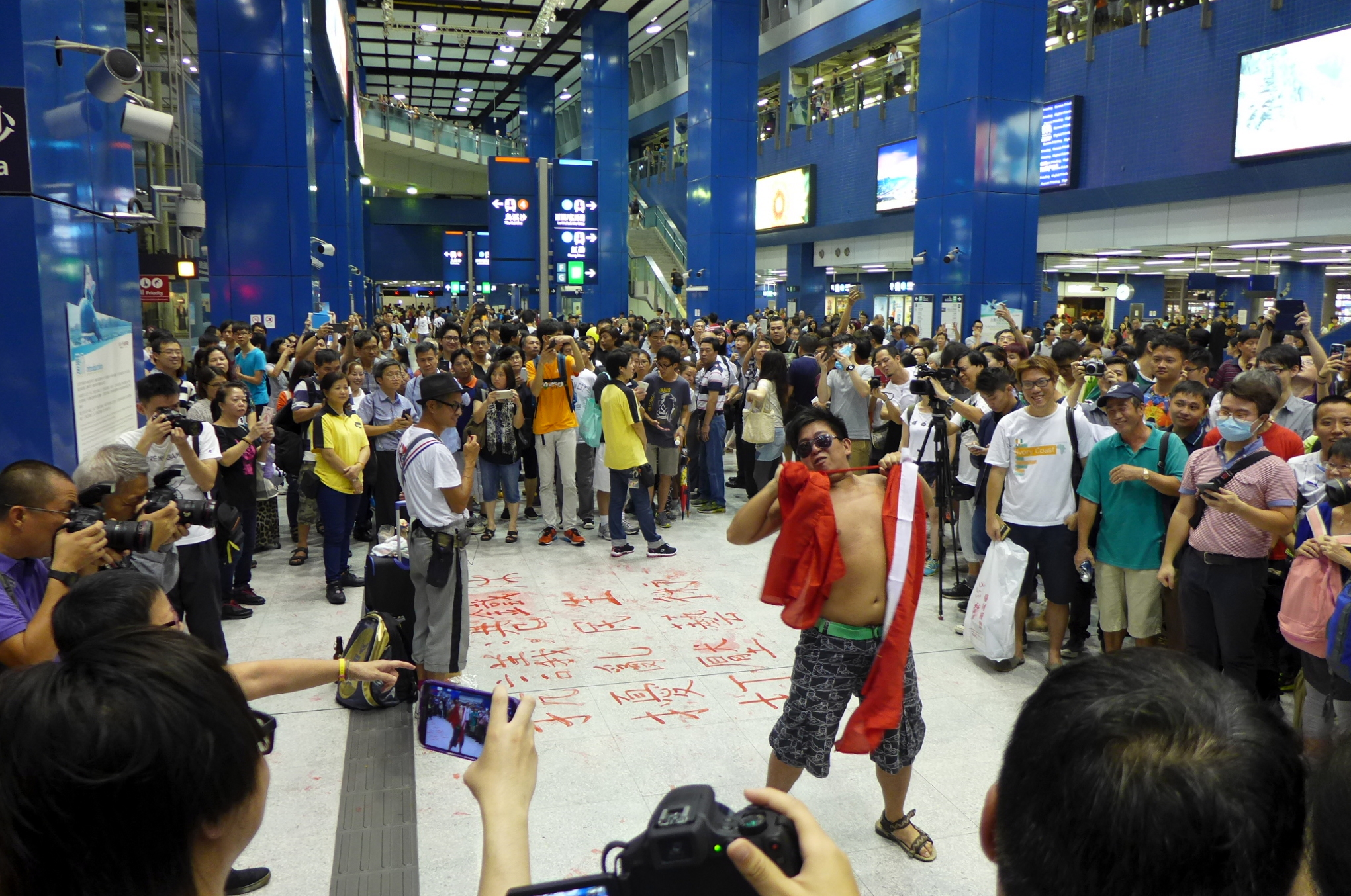
Protesters brought a "Communist Party flag" and made it available for people to stomp on

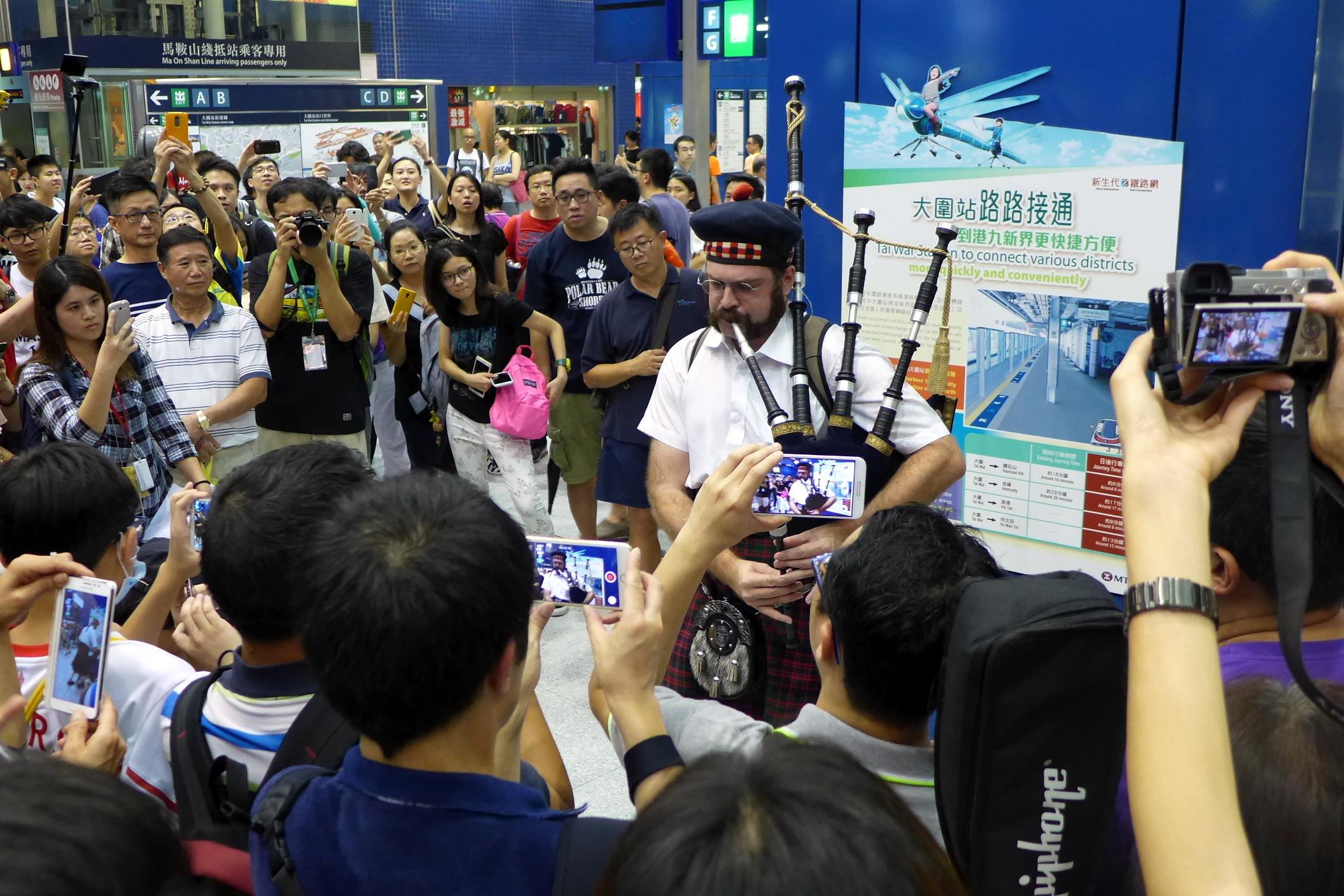
Canadian musician Patrick Brousseau playing the Scottish bagpipes

=== Move to Sha Tin station ===
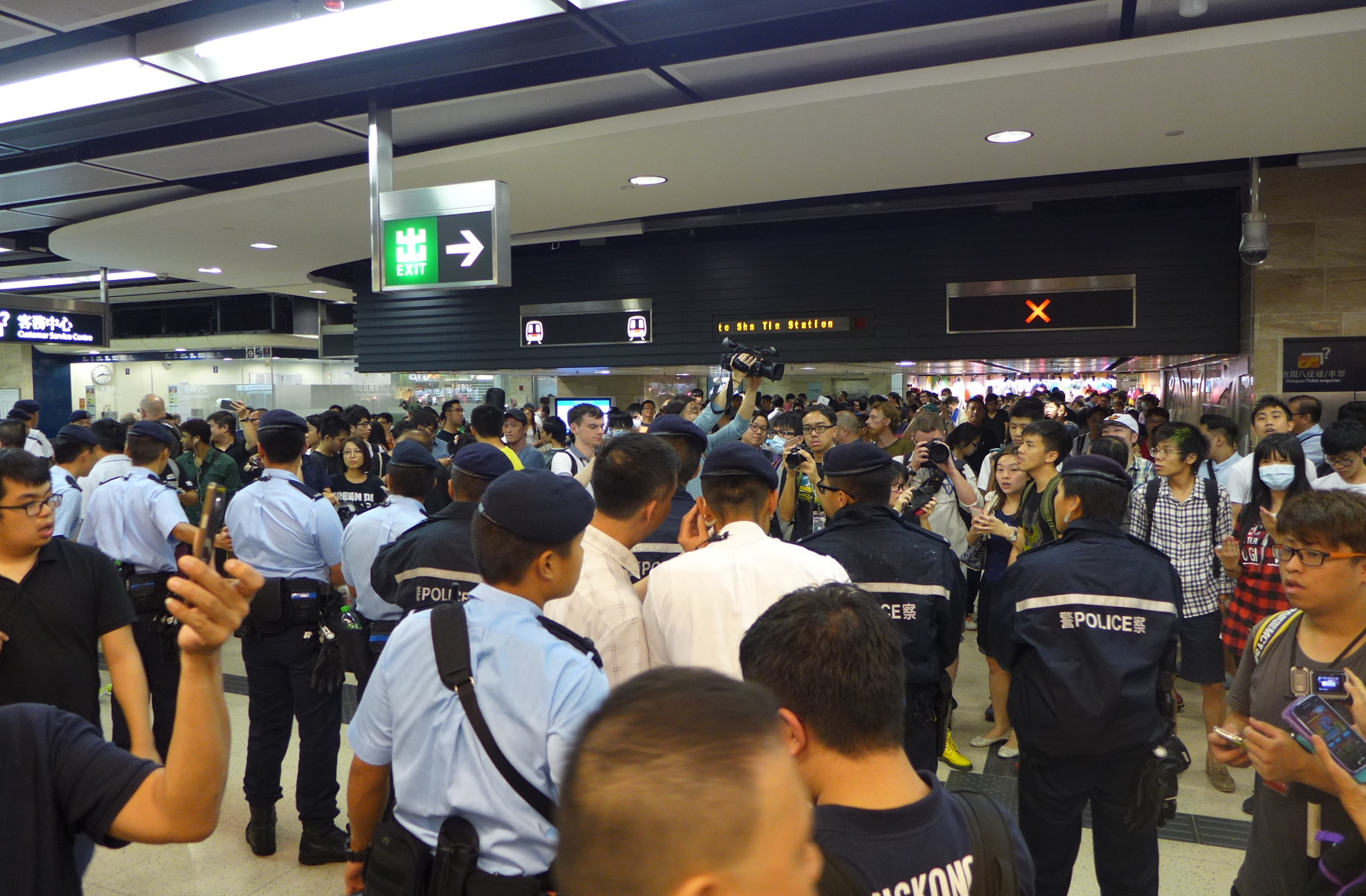
More than a dozen police officers stationed in Sha Tin Station

At around 7:40 pm, members of the public asked MTR staff on the platform to measure the oversized luggage of two passengers. When staff asked the passengers to leave the train so that the luggage could be inspected, the two sides became involved in a dispute because the passengers did not trust the staff. One man used his body to prevent the train doors from closing. The incident eventually escalated into pushing and a verbal altercation, and the people involved were removed from the train when it arrived at Fo Tan Station.

At around 8 pm, nearly 100 protesters, mainly from localist groups, moved to Sha Tin Station. They demanded that MTR staff strictly enforce the luggage regulations and inspect passengers’ luggage that was believed to exceed the permitted dimensions, making the issue of parallel traders a central focus of their protest. Some passengers, dissatisfied with being stopped by protesters, became involved in verbal disputes with them.

Video of Chan being hit
- https://www.youtube.com/watch?v=FuC-_pxNroM

At 8:20 pm, TVB female reporter Chan Ka-yan was reportedly struck by a 39-year-old woman, Cheung Gwai-ying, and taken to Prince of Wales Hospital for checkups. Police arrested Cheung, who was carrying large luggage while surrounded by protestors. While Chan was filming with her phone, the woman struck the phone out of Chan’s hand, causing it to hit Chan in the face. On 18 February 2016, the case was heard at Sha Tin Magistrates' Courts, where the woman was bound over for 12 months on a HK$1,000 bond.

== Reactions ==
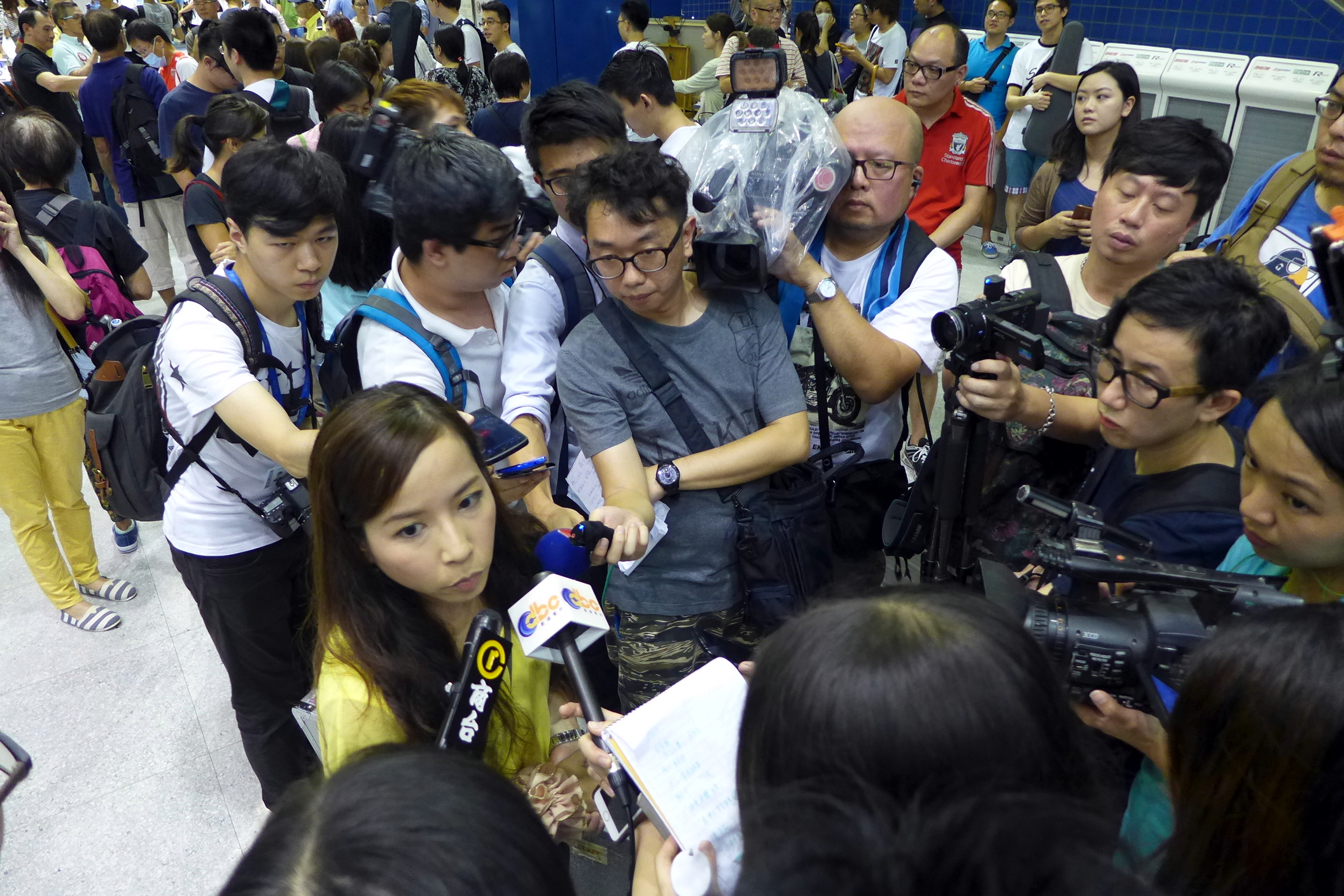
Organiser, Mavis Lung, interviewed by the media

Lung said that she had originally intended the demonstration to bring together musicians and stand for their rights to use the public transit. She subsequently expressed concern that portions of the demonstration had been taken over by other protesters whose objectives extended beyond the original campaign. She nevertheless regarded the campaign as successful in drawing public attention to the issue. In later comments, she said that the action had begun largely as a spontaneous response to what she regarded as unfair treatment and that she had not anticipated the political and confrontational elements that subsequently emerged.
