= Rita Carpio =

Hong Kong Cantopop singer

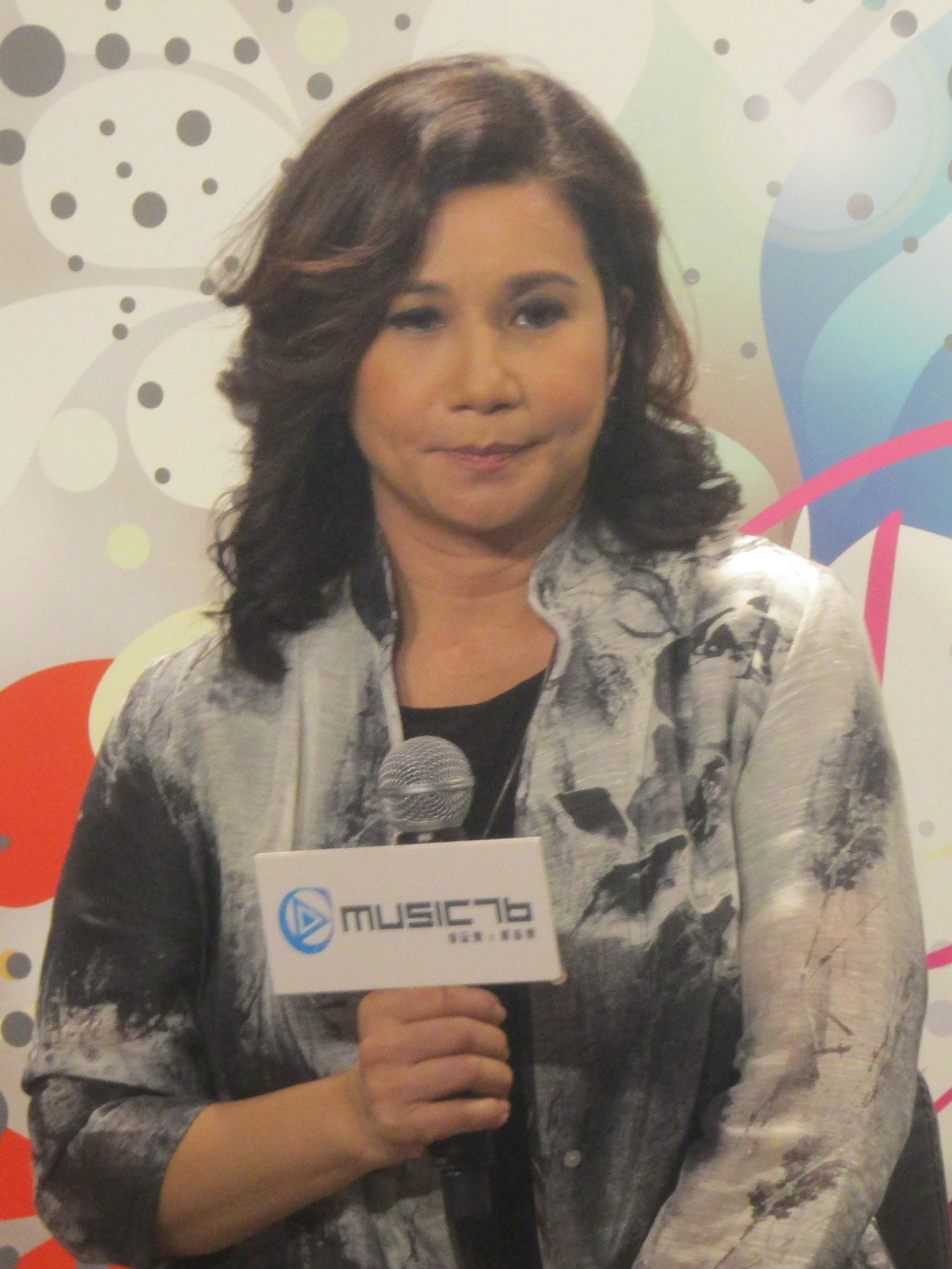
- Rita Carpio (2016)
- Born: Rita Maria Carpio; 17 June 1965 (age 59); Hong Kong
- Occupation: Singer
- Years active: 1982–present
- Children: 2

Chinese name
- Traditional Chinese: 韋綺姍
Transcriptions
- Musical career
- Also known as: Lee Tai (李媞); Mi Ti (米媞); Wai Yee Shan
- Origin: Hong Kong

Rita Maria Carpio (Chinese: 韋綺姍; born June 17, 1965) is a Hong Kong pop singer of Filipino-Macanese ethnicity. Active since the 1980s, she is most well known for the 1990 Cantopop classic "You Needn’t Be Acquaintances to Meet with Each Other" (相逢何必曾相識), a duet which she sang with Ram Chiang.

== Life ==
Born to Filipino and Macanese parents in Hong Kong, Rita Carpio was exposed to music at an early age since the Carpios in Hong Kong were heavily involved in the music industry. Her father Tony Carpio worked as a jazz musician, while her cousin Teresa Carpio became a household name in Hong Kong as a singer during Rita's childhood. Rita's parents were separated early in her life, so she and her siblings were raised by her father, who taught them the piano and guitar. While her siblings eventually became established musicians playing instruments, Rita opted to sing instead, and started to sing at her father's performances as a teenager. Her father used to turn her microphone's volume down in these performances in order to train her voice.

In 1982, she participated in the inaugural New Talent Singing Awards hosted by Hong Kong's television broadcaster TVB under the name Rita Maria Carpio. While most other contestants chose to sing Chinese songs, Rita Carpio did not feel confident performing in Chinese (having been brought up in an English-speaking household) and performed The Nolans' "Sexy Music". She emerged as the contest's first runner-up, losing only to Anita Mui, future Cantopop diva. Rita Carpio got a contract with Capital Artists from the contest, but the company focused their resources on Anita Mui, and Rita Carpio found her English singing to be incompatible with the company's focus on the Cantopop market. She left the company under two years.

In the late 1980s, Carpio was scouted by a Taiwanese record label to sing English songs for the Taiwan market, where she was named Mi Ti (米媞, from her name Rita) for marketing purposes. She released two English albums there, Days of Sunshine (1988) and High Cost of Living (1989) to mild success; however, she became homesick and went back to Hong Kong. Without an agent of her own, she did not leverage the fame she gathered in Taiwan to stage a comeback to the Hong Kong market, and instead had to start from the bottom. She started singing for advertising agencies and ended up as a backing vocalist for Ram Chiang. Her resonant voice in the background of Chiang's song "Those Who Have to Go Will Eventually Go" (要走的始終都要走) attracted attention from radio DJs, which prompted Chiang's producer to sign her onto their label Fitto Record.

Chiang wrote the duet "You Needn’t Be Acquaintances to Meet with Each Other" (相逢何必曾相識) for Carpio to use in his upcoming album Meeting/Going (相逢/走). For the song's release, the record label wanted to promote Caprio as a "local Chinese", thus giving her the Chinese name Wai Yee Shan (韋綺姍), a stage name that she uses to this day. The song was released to wide acclaim, earning it a spot in the 1990 Jade Solid Gold Best Ten Music Awards by TVB and the "My Favourite Song" award in the same year's Ultimate Song Chart Awards by Commercial Radio Hong Kong.

Having launched her Hong Kong career with such success, Rita Carpio released Revolution (1990), her first full album in Hong Kong. Her performance of the song "Oh My God!" (跪在大門後; lit. "Kneel Behind the Door") from the album won her first place in the Hong Kong sub-contest of the 1990 ABU Golden Kite World Song Festival, and she went to Kuala Lumpur to represent Hong Kong in the main contest as a finalist. She released two more albums (and a remix album) afterwards, before leaving the industry to start a family. She now has two daughters.

In 2014, she was invited by Ram Chiang, now an actor, to make an appearance in the TVB comedy drama Come On, Cousin. In her first appearance in a TV drama, she played the deceased wife of Chiang's character. The two performed their classic duet "You Needn’t Be Acquaintances to Meet with Each Other" in episode 12, which went viral in Hong Kong. Rita Carpio took this opportunity to release a hi-fi album, featuring new recordings of her songs from 20 years ago. In addition to performing at shows, she also teaches music, with Kandy Wong being one of her notable students.

== Discography ==
- Star Hits Vol.3 (1978) — Sings "Boogie Oogie Oogie" only
- The Best Of 20 Years Before Vol.5 (1982) — Featured on four songs. (Al Di La, Blue Tango, Only You and Yellow Rose Of Texas)
- Greatest Oldies 48 (Early 80s) — English Album with Kenny Cheng and Lung Ying-Ha
- 心裏氹氹轉/心中的秘密 (1986) — EP with Wawa
- Greatest Oldies 48 Vol.2 (Late 80s) — English Album with Kenny Cheng
- Days of Sunshine (來自陽光的小女人, 1988) — English album
- High Cost of Loving (無價的愛, 1989) — English album
- Revolution (革命, 1990) — Cantonese album
- Remix (1991)
- Love Me Once Again (1993) — Cantonese album
- 解放 (1994) — Cantonese album
- Legendary Voices (傳奇巨聲, 2014) — Compilation album with Ram Chiang
- Dolce Rita (綺麗人生, 2016)

== Filmography ==
- Come On, Cousin (2014), Chan Yee Shan — TVB drama
- Knock Knock Who's There? (有客到, 2015) — Hong Kong horror film
- Oh My Grad (老表，畢業喇！, 2017) — TVB drama
