= Paul Fonoroff =

American film critic (born 1954)

- Born: Paul Kendel Fonoroff; 1954 (age 71–72); Cleveland, Ohio, U.S.
- Education: Brown University (BA); University of Southern California (MFA)
- Occupations: Film critic; actor

Chinese name
- Traditional Chinese: 方保羅
Transcriptions
Yue: Cantonese
- Jyutping: Fong^{1} Bou^{2} Lo^{4}

Paul Kendel Fonoroff (born 1954) is a film critic and historian specializing in Chinese-language cinema. Born in the United States, he spent several years of schooling in China, accepting a fellowship at Peking University. After moving to Hong Kong in 1983, Fonoroff spent decades ingrained in its local film culture, writing reviews for the South China Morning Post and appearing on television to discuss cinema. He also received small acting parts in about twenty films.

Over the decades, Fonoroff amassed a large collection of Chinese film journals and periodicals. He donated this collection to the University of California, Berkeley in 2015.

== Biography ==
Fonoroff was born in Cleveland, Ohio. He began studying Chinese in high school, participating in a youth study group going to Hong Kong in 1972. He continued his education at Brown University, taking a year off to study Mandarin at Nanyang University and completing his undergraduate degree in Chinese. Interested in film, he went to University of Southern California to receive a Master of Fine Arts. When the United States and China rekindled diplomatic relations in 1979, Fonoroff traveled to Beijing, accepting a grant to research Chinese cinema at Peking University.

Upon completion of his studies in Beijing, Fonoroff moved to Hong Kong in 1983. He accepted a role on TVB as a scriptwriter, while also writing for a local magazine. Fonoroff remained in Hong Kong for decades, where he consistently wrote about movies and appeared in over a thousand episodes of cinema-related television programs in Cantonese, Mandarin, and English. He hosted the show Movie World on Asia Television's international channel, and wrote film reviews for the South China Morning Post. After accepting his first Hong Kong film role in Sworn Brothers (1987), Fonoroff made appearances in over twenty movies and TV dramas. These included "special guest appearances" in Once Upon a Time in China II and Fight Back to School II (both 1992).

Fonoroff has written several books on Hong Kong cinema. In 1997, he authored Silver Light: A Pictorial History of Hong Kong Cinema 1920–1970, a picture book utilising his collection of Hong Kong movie memorabilia. This book was also given a separate translation in Chinese and released. The following year, Fonoroff published At the Hong Kong Movies: 600 Reviews from 1988 Till the Handover, a compilation of the various newspaper columns he wrote. Fonoroff's collection of film periodicals, scripts, and posters were later showcased in Chinese Movie Magazines: From Charlie Chaplin to Chairman Mao 1951–1981. This book was included in The New York Times' selection of Best Art Books of 2018. In 2015, Fonoroff's collection was acquired by the University of California, Berkeley. The collection, housed in the university's C.V. Starr East Asian Library, is generally considered the largest Chinese film-related archive outside China.

Fonoroff is a member of the Hong Kong Film Critics Society and the Performing Artists Guild of Hong Kong. He is also an advisor to the Hong Kong Film Archive.

== Movie-Related Series ==
- Watching Cantonese Classics 粵語長片是咁睇的 (2021-2022) - Cantonese
- Asian Movie Archaeologist 方保羅-電影考古家 (2010) - Mandarin
- Hong Kong Movie Odyssey (2004) - English
- Phoenix Tonight 相聚鳳凰台 (1998-2002) - Mandarin
- Movie World 電影世界 (1996-1998) - Mandarin
- Entertainment News 非常娛樂 (1994-1996) - Mandarin
- Movie Station 電影情報組 (1994-1995) - Cantonese
- Look for a Star 星海追蹤 (1993-1994) - English
- Camera Time 開麥拉時間 (1991) - Cantonese
- Movie Talk 戲人戲語 (1990-1993) - Cantonese
- Movie World 電影世界 (1989-1993) - English
- Eye on Hong Kong 放眼香港 (1987-1989) - English

== Filmography ==
- Helios 赤道 (2015) Martin Koo
- Amphetamine 安非他命 (2010)
- Drink-Drank-Drunk千杯不醉 (2005) Bookstore Owner
- A Family in Hong Kong 香港一家人 (2000) (TV Series)
- What Are You Gonna Do, Sai Fung? 1959某日某 (1999) Pierre Birton
- Dream Trips 夢之旅 (1999) Dream Guide
- Spirit of the Dragon 老鼠龍之猛龍過港 (1998)
- Bishonen美少年之戀 (1998)
- Lawyer Lawyer 算死草]] (1997) - Judge
- I Have a Date with Spring 我和春天有個約會 (1996) - Father Yung 容神父 (TV Series)
- Tristar 大三元 (1996) - Bearded Mormon
- What a Wonderful Life 奇異旅程之真心愛生命 (1996) - Reporter Going to Canada
- Once in a Lifetime 終身大事 (1995) - Doctor
- The Final Option 飛虎雄心 (1994) - Police Official
- The Rise and Fall of Qing Dynasty IV 十三皇朝:溥儀]] (1992) - Reginald Johnston (TV Series)
- Fight Back to School Part 2 逃學威龍2 (1992) - Secretary of Security
- Summer Lovers 夏日情人 (1992) - Laserdisc Shop Clerk
- Once Upon a Time in China II 黃飛鴻2男兒當自強 (1992) - British Consul
- Love: Now You See It... Now You Don't 我愛扭紋柴 (1992) - Surveyor
- The Inspector Wears Skirts 4 92霸王花對霸王花 (1992) - Commander
- Once Upon a Time a Hero in China 黃飛鴻笑傳 (1992) - Indiana Jones
- Alan and Eric Between Hello and Goodbye 雙城故事 (1991) - Hairy Keung
- Sworn Brothers肝膽相照 (1987) - Extra in Courtroom
- Love Bittersweet愛情麥芽糖 (1984) - Admirer of Festival Lantern
- The Herdsman牧馬人 (1982) - Extra Dancing in Restaurant
- The Sea is Calling 大海在呼唤 (1982) - Mabasuo 馬巴索
