= Paul Wong (musician) =

Hong Kong musical artist (born 1964)

- 黃貫中
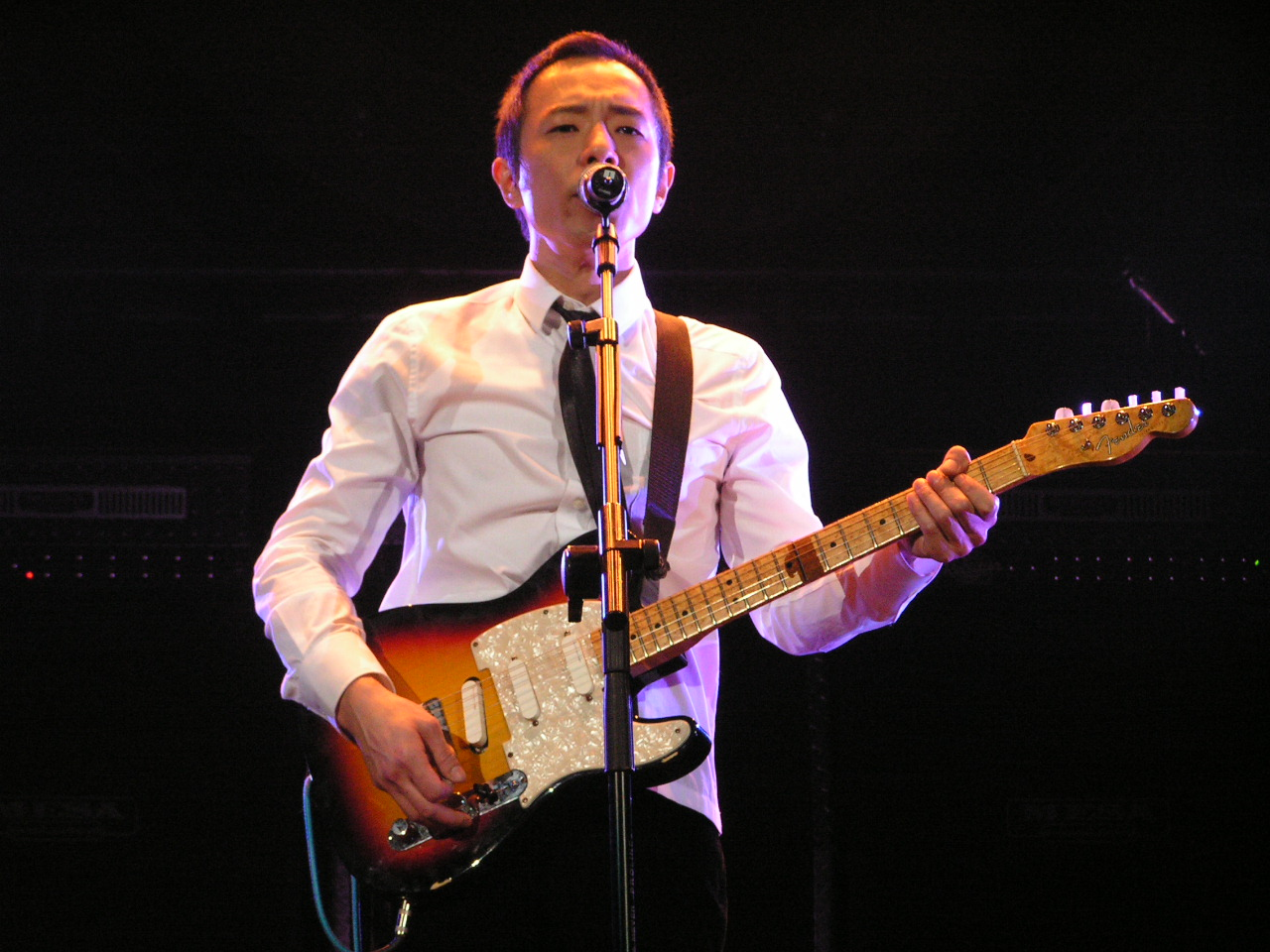
- Wong performing in 2006
- Born: Wong Koon-chung; 31 March 1964 (age 62); British Hong Kong
- Other names: Godfather of bands; Godfather of rock
- Education: Higher Diploma in Design, Hong Kong Polytechnic College
- Occupations: Musician; singer; songwriter; record producer; designer
- Years active: 1985–present
- Spouse: Athena Chu (m. 2012)
- Children: 1

Chinese name
- Traditional Chinese: 黃貫中
- Simplified Chinese: 黄贯中
Transcriptions
Standard Mandarin
- Hanyu Pinyin: Huáng Guànzhōng
Yue: Cantonese
- Jyutping: Wong4 Gun3zung1
- Musical career
- Genres: Rock; Cantopop; Mandopop
- Instruments: Vocals; guitar
- Labels: Universal Records; Pathe Records; Warner Records; WOW Records
- Formerly of: Beyond

Paul Wong Koon-chung (born 黃貫中; 31 March 1964), known professionally as Paul Wong, is a Hong Kong musician, singer, songwriter and record producer. He achieved fame in Asia as the lead guitarist of the rock band Beyond until the band disbanded in 2005. After lead vocalist Wong Ka Kui's death, Wong became the lead vocalist and main songwriter for Beyond. He also earned the award "The Best Rock Singer" of the Hit Awards in 2012.

== Biography ==
=== 1964–2005: Early life and Beyond ===
Paul Wong was born on 31 March 1964, growing up with father, mother and two younger brothers in Kowloon City. Still, his mother later lived separately from her husband and children as his parents divorced.

As a juvenile, he was the champion at a couple of art contests. Until he majored in design at Hong Kong Polytechnic College, he was invited by drummer Yip Sai Wing to handle a design project for Beyond's first concert. Later he became friends with them as well as a member replacing the former lead guitarist Chan Sze On. While he worked as a designer at an advertising company, he was meantime in progress of several pieces of design work, such as the envelope design of the cassette Goodbye Ideals (1986) and the clothing design for Contact of Life Concert (1991).

Regarding his vocal contribution to Beyond, he started off as the lead vocalist singing the lead on "Midnight Stray" (1988). In the same year, he later provided lead vocals on "The Ground", one of the band's big hits. Besides, he began to play roles in different television series, including Two of a Kind featuring Hacken Lee and Wong in the leading roles.

On 30 June 1993, the mainstay of Beyond Wong Ka Kui was deceased. Thereafter the remaining three members switched to Rock Records making the band's next album The 2nd Floor Flat (1994). After Wong Ka Kui's death, Paul Wong and Wong Ka Keung became the band's primary songwriters. In circa 1999, the media told that Paul Wong and Wong Ka Keung had discorded due to the difference between their musical ideas. Beyond in 2003 resumed conducting the concerts Beyond Beyond Beyond Live. Still, they held the band's final and break-up concert Beyond The Story Live in 2005.

=== 1999–present: Solo career ===
In late 1999, Wong launched his work as a solo singer while Beyond was taking a break. He formed the band Hann consisting of Jun Kung, Mak Man Wai (member of LMF) and Dino Acconci from the band Soler. Later on Wong established his own studio Polar Bear Studio. Afterward he signed a contract with Universal Records and then released Yellow Paul Wong (2001) and Black White (2001) in order. By these two albums, he won "The Gold Award as a Singer-songwriter" in Ultimate Song Chart Awards Presentation (2001 & 2002).

Wong showed his interest in musicals. In 2000 he played the protagonist Tony in the musical The Dream Broken in Victoria Harbour by troupe Theatre Space. The story was adapted from a broadway musical West Side Story, which was localised and whose background was moved to Hong Kong. At the performances, local conductor Henry Shek took the lead and played with Hong Kong New Philharmonic Symphonic Orchestra as all performers at the seashore of Hong Kong Cultural Centre.

In November 2002 Wong held his debut concert Play It Loud in Hong Kong Coliseum. After the contract with Universal had ended, he issued an album Existence (2004), where he invested in by himself.

In 2005 by the dissolution of Beyond, they ran eight sessions of Beyond The Story Live 2005 at Hong Kong Coliseum, which is the band's last world tour. Consequently, he worked as the musical supervisor for the musical Akapi Shooting Incident by Commercial Radio Hong Kong, in which Sammy Leung and Kitty Yuen engaged and Wong also wrote a few soundtracks.

In April 2006, Wong signed a contract with Chinese Warner Records to explore the market of the Mainland China. In October he conducted solo concerts at Hong Kong Coliseum, namely Paul Wong Hong Kong Concert 2006: The Music of Madman's Study.

== Discography ==
=== Solo albums and EPs ===
Release date	Title	Language	Label
January 2001	Yellow Paul Wong	Cantonese	Universal
December 2001	Black White (黑白)	Cantonese	Universal
April 2002	Identical Root (同根)	Cantonese	Universal
November 2002	Play It Loud	Cantonese	Universal
July 2004	I Now Exists (我在存在)	Cantonese	Pathe Records
July 2007	I Now Exists	Mandarin	WOW Music
October 2011	Concerto in A minor (A小調協奏曲)	Cantonese / Mandarin	WOW Music
January 2013	Paul Wong Collection	Mandarin	WOW Music
September 2025	Fragments (碎片)	Cantonese	

=== Songs for artists ===
Year	Single	Artist	Role
1997	"Distressed By Myself" (自尋煩惱)	Andy Hui	Songwriter; Lyricist; Arranger; Producer
1998	"Just Say Gooy-Bye"	Karen Mok	Songwriter
1999	"Nuts" (神經病)	Jordan Chan	Songwriter
1999	"Don't Let Me Drink Too Much" (別讓我喝太多)	Andy Hui	Songwriter
1999	"I Can't"	Andy Hui	Songwriter
1999	"On My God" (我的天)	Karen Mok	Songwriter; Arranger; Producer
1999	"Awesome" (了不起)	Lawrence Chou	Songwriter, Lyricist
2000	"A Black Tie" (黑色領帶)	Daniel Chan	Songwriter, Arranger
2000	"Drive"	Kang Jingchun (康淨淳)	Songwriter
2000	"Everyone Is Mad" (所有人是傻)	Nicholas Tse	Songwriter; Arranger; Producer
2001	"Good Dog" (好狗)	Jan Lamb	Songwriter; Arranger; Producer
2002	"Elegance Wins the Heaven" (美麗勝天國)	Wong He	Songwriter
2002	"Rainy Days"	Athena Chu	Songwriter, Producer
2002	"Jump Up" (跳起來)	Athena Chu	Songwriter; Arranger; Producer
2002	"New Colourful World" (彩色新天地)	Johnny Tseng (曾國銘)	Songwriter
2002	"We Can Change"	Wong Ka Ming (王嘉明)	Songwriter, Arranger
2003	"Overnight Feud" (隔夜仇)	Hacken Lee	Songwriter, Producer
2003	"Understand, okay" (明白了吧)	Hacken Lee	Songwriter, Producer
2004	"How Much Can You Love" (可以幾愛)	Ella Koon	Songwriter, Producer
2004	"Awesome (了不起)"	Andy Hui	Songwriter
2004	"Marlon Brando" (馬龍白蘭度)	Andy Lau	Songwriter; Arranger; Producer
2004	"Your Majesty" (萬歲)	Jordan Chan	Songwriter
2004	"Saturday Night"	Andy Hui	Songwriter, Producer
2004	"Don't Provoke Me" (不要惹我)	Athena Chu	Songwriter, Producer
2004	"Ah-oh"	Athena Chu	Songwriter, Producer
2004	"Spell" (法術)	Athena Chu	Songwriter, Producer
2004	"I Win" (我贏了)	Athena Chu	Songwriter, Producer
2004	"A Queen in Trouble" (落難皇后)	Gigi Leung	Songwriter; Arranger; Producer
2005	"Where Are You" (你在哪裡)	Fiona Sit	Producer
2006	"Good Brothers" (好兄弟)	Softhard	Songwriter; Arranger; Producer
2008	"A Representative Wife" (標準太太)	Josie Ho	Songwriter; Arranger; Producer
2008	"A Poisoned Scorpion" (中毒蠍子)	Josie Ho	Songwriter, Arranger
2008	"Not a Doll" (不是娃娃)	Elanne Kwong	Songwriter, Producer
2008	"Starting Off" (出發)	Liu Xuan	Songwriter; Lyricist; Arranger; Producer
2008	"An Inflatable Doll" (充氣娃娃)	Shino Lin	Songwriter
2008	"Go Go Dragon" (GO GO 飛龍)	Jan Lamb	Songwriter, Producer
2009	"Authentic" (不加塑)	Keeva Mak (麥家瑜)	Songwriter, Arranger
2009	"Hong Kong Hong Kong" (香港香港)	Alan Tam	Songwriter; Arranger; Producer
2009	"Last Time the Last Time" (上次無下次)	Alan Tam	Songwriter; Arranger; Producer
2009	"Poors" (窮鬼)	Jan Lamb	Songwriter; Arranger; Producer
2009	"Never Said Goodbye"	Juno Mak	Arranger, guitar
2011	"Ignorant During Youthhood" (年少無知)	Bowie Lam, Moses Chan, Kenny Wong (黃德斌)	Songwriter, Producer
2015	"A Virtuous Robber" (盜亦有道)	Alex Chia (謝中傑)	Songwriter; Arranger; Producer

== Filmography ==
Film	Year	Role
Sworn Brothers	1987	
No Regret	1987	
The Black Wall	1989	
The Fun, the Luck & the Tycoon	1989	
Happy Ghost IV	1990	
Beyond's Diary	1991	
Daddy, Father and Papa	1991	
Love and Let Love!	1998	
The Boss Up There	1999	
Sleeping with the Dead	2002	
Escape from Hong Kong Island	2004	
The Heavenly Kings	2006	
Wonderful Times	2006	
Rebellion	2009	
Young and Dangerous: Reloaded	2013	
The Way We Dance	2013	
Doomsday Party	2013	
