= Happy Ghost IV =

1990 Hong Kong film by Clifton Ko

- Original Hong Kong poster.
- Traditional Chinese: 開心鬼救開心鬼
- Simplified Chinese: 开心鬼救开心鬼
- Hanyu Pinyin: Kai xin gui jiu kai xin gui
- Directed by: Clifton Ko
- Written by: Raymond Wong
- Produced by: Raymond Wong
- Starring: Raymond Wong; May Lo; Fennie Yuen; Charine Chan
- Cinematography: Sander Lee
- Edited by: Kam Ma
- Music by: Paul Wong; Wong Ka Keung; Wong Ka Kui; Yip Sai Wing
- Production companies: Pak Ming Films Ltd. Ko Chi Sum Films Co. Ltd.
- Distributed by: Newport Entertainment Co. Ltd.
- Release date: 30 June 1990
- Running time: 84 minutes
- Country: Hong Kong
- Language: Cantonese
- Box office: HK$ 11,780,725

Happy Ghost IV (released in the Philippines as Magic to Win 4) (Chinese: 開心鬼救開心鬼) is a 1990 Hong Kong comedy film directed by Clifton Ko. The film stars Raymond Wong and Pauline Yeung.

== Cast ==
- Raymond Wong as Hong Sum-kwai
- Pauline Yeung as Annie
- Beyond as Man, Mo, Ying, and Kit
- Woo Fung as Annie's father
- Charlie Cho as Chiu
- Tommy Wong as Crazy Bill
- Lau Shun as Crazy Kwan Yeung
- James Wong as judge
- Clifton Ko as man in washroom

== Release ==
=== Box office ===
Happy Ghost IV grossed a total of HK$11,780,725. The film ran in Hong Kong theatres from 30 June 1990 to 2 August 1990.

== Reception ==
In his book Horror and Science Fiction Film IV, Donald C Willis described Happy Ghost IV as an "occasionally funny low comedy" with "some okay "invisible ghost" effects".

== See also ==
- Clifton Ko filmography
- List of Hong Kong films of 1990

== Notes ==
=== References ===
- Willis, Donald C. (1997). Horror and Science Fiction Films IV. Scarecrow Press. ISBN 0-8108-3055-8.
