= Wong Ka Kui =

Hong Kong musician (1962–1993)

- 黃家駒
- Wong in 1993
- Born: Wong Ka Kui; 10 June 1962; Sham Shui Po, Kowloon, British Hong Kong
- Died: 30 June 1993 (aged 31); Shinjuku, Tokyo, Japan
- Burial place: Tseung Kwan O Chinese Permanent Cemetery
- Other name: Koma Wong
- Education: Secondary 5, Baldwin College (博允英文中學)
- Occupations: Musician; singer; songwriter
- Years active: 1983–1993
- Relatives: 4, including Wong Ka Keung

Chinese name
- Traditional Chinese: 黃家駒
- Simplified Chinese: 黄家驹
Transcriptions
Standard Mandarin
- Hanyu Pinyin: Huáng Jiājū
Yue: Cantonese
- Jyutping: Wong4 Gaa1-keoi1
- Musical career
- Genres: Rock; Cantopop; Mandopop; J-pop
- Instruments: Vocals; guitar
- Labels: Kinn's Music; Cinepoly Records; Warner Records
- Formerly of: Beyond

Wong Ka Kui (Chinese: 黃家駒; Jyutping: Wong4 Gaa1-keoi1; 10 June 1962 – 30 June 1993), also known by his Japanese stage name Koma Wong, was a Hong Kong musician, singer and songwriter, best known as the leader and a co-founder of the rock band Beyond, where he was the lead vocalist, the rhythm guitarist and the primary songwriter. His younger brother Wong Ka Keung was also the band's bass guitarist. Wong Ka Kui wrote over 100 songs in his short life and was considered one of the iconic figures of Cantonese and Mandarin rock music.

== Life and career ==
=== Early life ===
Wong was born on 10 June 1962, and grew up in So Uk Estate, Sham Shui Po.

When Wong was a junior pupil in secondary school, he was firstly exposed to European and American music due to his classmate's introduction. Wong later on became a big fan of David Bowie and Pink Floyd. Until Wong was 17, he taught himself to play the guitar on an acoustic guitar which was pre-owned and then given by a neighbour. When he desired to learn the electric guitar, he bought a red Fender Stratocaster with a maplewood neck which was also second-handed. Since Wong was once teased for his poor guitar playing, he determined to refine his guitar skills until he could be as proficient as the person who teased him was.

Before the outset of Wong's musical career, he worked as an office assistant, mechanic, and scenery decorator for a TV company after he had graduated at secondary 5 from Baldwin College.

=== Formation of Beyond ===
In 1981, Wong (rhythm guitar) made friends with Yip Sai Wing (drums) at the piano company called 'Collin Music'. They subsequently teamed up with William Tang (鄧煒謙; lead guitar) and Lee Wing Chiu (李榮潮; bass guitar) as a band. In 1983, the band participated in the contest called 'Guitar Players Festival' under the band name 'Beyond', created by Tang who made a vow to transcend themselves in the pursuit of musical attainments. In 1984, Lee left Beyond and Wong Ka Keung then filled in Lee's position (bass). In 1985, Tang's departure resulted in Paul Wong's engagement as the lead guitarist besides his design and graphics work.

Consisting of Wong Ka Kui, Yip Sai Wing, Wong Ka Keung, and Paul Wong, Beyond conducted debuted Beyond concert Forever Waiting (永遠等待演唱會) in 1985, which was the band’s only self-funded concert.

In 1986, Lau Chi Yuen (劉志遠) joined Beyond as the lead guitarist and the keyboardist, recording the band's first album Goodbye Ideals (再見理想) (1986), which was their only self-funded album or EP. Coincidentally Beyond met Leslie Chan (陳健添) who was the proprietor of Kinn's Music, the band were shaped into a more down-to-earth and idolised. The first Beyond EP Forever Waiting (永遠等待), the second Beyond album Arabian Dancing Girls (亞拉伯跳舞女郎) (1987), and the third Beyond album Modern Stage (現代舞台) (1988) were released under the record label Kinn's Music.

=== 1988–1991: First success, Cinepoly Records and social concerns ===
In 1988, Beyond signed the contract to Cinepoly Records, collaborating with the company proprietor Chan Siu Po (陳少寶). Due to the Beyond album Secret Police (秘密警察) (1988) released by Cinepoly, the band won a couple of awards in Jade Solid Gold Best Ten Music Awards Presentation. In this album, the best-known track was "The Grand Earth" (大地). In 1989, Beyond kept earning awards when the band's next album Beyond IV (1989) was also released by Cinepoly. Their next best-known track "Truly Love You" (真的愛妳) was even popular since it became an award-winning number in the final of Jade Solid Gold Best Ten Music Awards Presentation 1989 and RTHK Top 10 Gold Songs Awards 1989.

In 1990, another Beyond song "Glorious Years (光輝歲月)" from the album Destiny Party (命運派對) (1990) became an award-winning number in the final of Jade Solid Gold Best Ten Music Awards Presentation 1990, for which Wong Ka Kui under his name rather than the band name also won "the Best Lyrics Award".

From 1990 to 1991, Beyond paid more attention to the social issues and ongoing events around the world. The music and lyrics in the song "Glorious Years" (光輝歲月) was created during Wong's visit to New Guinea in 1990 and it is a tribute to former South-African president Nelson Mandela. In 1991, the band visited Kenya and witnessed the grinding poverty and misery there. Wong was again enlightened to write music and lyrics in the song "Amani" from the album Hesitation (猶豫). "Amani" means "peace" in Swahili and this song also included lyrics in Swahili, calling for peace and love. Upon their return, a number of songs were written addressing the serious problems of Africa. The Beyond Third World Foundation was created in the same year with profits from the redistribution of an early album.

=== Career in Japan ===
In the 1990s, Wong began to feel limited by the Hong Kong music industry; he once said that "there's only the entertainment industry but not a music industry in Hong Kong." Beyond thus decided to focus on their career in Japan. In January 1992, the band signed a worldwide management contract with Japanese record label Amuse. During the year, they released an album called Continue the Revolution (繼續革命). In May 1993, Beyond returned to Hong Kong with a new album Rock and Roll (樂與怒). Wong's signature work "Boundless Oceans, Vast Skies" (海闊天空) won the Best Original Song award in Hong Kong. Before they went back to Japan, Beyond held unplugged live concerts in Hong Kong and Malaysia, which were Beyond's last concert with Wong Ka Kui.

== Death ==
Beyond arrived in Japan in January 1993 to record new material and engage in media appearances. On 24 June 1993, the band appeared at a Tokyo Fuji Television game show called If Uchannan-chan is Going to Do It, We Have to Do It! (ウッチャンナンチャンのやるならやらねば!). Fifteen minutes after the show commenced, an accident occurred. The stage floor was very narrow and slippery, and both Wong and host Teruyoshi Uchimura slipped and fell 2.7 meters off the platform, live on air. Wong landed head first to the ground and immediately slipped into a coma when Uchimura landed on Wong's chest. Uchimura received no serious injury, while Wong was rushed to the hospital.

On 26 June, several music fans of Beyond gathered at the carpark lot of the Commercial Radio Hong Kong Station to pray for him. The next day, as doctors declared the case hopeless, a traditional Chinese medicine practitioner arrived to treat Wong, who showed slight improvement afterwards. Six days later, on 30 June 1993, at 16:15 at the Tokyo Women's Medical University Hospital, a Japanese representative announced Wong's death in a press conference.

Wong's body was transported back to Hong Kong on 3 July, with hundreds of people awaiting its arrival at Kai Tak Airport. His funeral procession took place two days later, bringing various major streets in Hong Kong to a standstill. Thousands of celebrities and fans attended his funeral service. Wong was buried in Tseung Kwan O Chinese Permanent Cemetery, with his Martin D-28 acoustic guitar. His tombstone is made of white marble and bears the image of a guitar. Every year on his birthday and the anniversary of his passing, fans gather at his tomb to pay their respects.

== Legacy ==
The song "Boundless Oceans, Vast Skies" was written by Wong in 1993 and has been an anthem of Cantonese rock music and one of Beyond's signature songs. On 12 April 2022, it became the first Cantonese song to reach 100 million views on YouTube.

During a concert of Beyond in 2003, Wong was resurrected in the form of a life-size video projection, alongside the remaining band members while they sang the song "Combat for Twenty Years" (抗戰二十年) in memory of him 10 years after his death.

On 8 November 2005, Hong Kong post office released a stamp collection called "Hong Kong Pop Singers". Wong was one of the five singers who had their images printed on stamps.

In a vote conducted by Sina China in 2007, Wong was one of the Most Missed Celebrities along with Leslie Cheung and Anita Mui. Many tribute songs have been written and dedicated to him, including "The Champion of Love" by the rock band Bakufu-Slump, "Him" by the rock band Soler, "Wish You Well" by his brother Wong Ka Keung, "Paradise" by Beyond, "Combat for twenty years" by Beyond and "The Story" by Paul Wong.

In December 2007, Radio Television Hong Kong (RTHK) released a documentary series called "A Legend Never Dies", featuring Roman Tam, Anita Mui, Leslie Cheung, Teresa Teng, Wong Ka Kui and Danny Chan. The episode of Wong aired on TVB on 26 January 2008. The episode is entitled: Wong Ka Kui "The Spring Water of Hong Kong Music Industry."

The asteroid 41742 Wongkakui was named in his memory on 29 May 2018.

== Filmography ==
- Sworn Brothers (1987)
- No Regret (1987)
- The Black Wall (1989)
- The Fun, the Luck & the Tycoon (1989)
- Happy Ghost IV (1990)
- Beyond's Diary (1991)
- The Banquet (1991)
- Cageman (1992)

== Selected awards ==
- 1989 – won "Song of the Year" award for the song "Truly Love You" at Hong Kong's Jade Solid Gold Awards
