= Boundless Oceans, Vast Skies =

1993 song by Beyond

"海闊天空 (Boundless Oceans, Vast Skies)"

Single by Beyond

from the album Rock and Roll
- Language: Cantonese
- B-side: "What For"
- Released: 14 May 1993
- Recorded: 1993
- Genre: Pop rock; art rock
- Length: 5:24
- Label: Warner Music Group
- Songwriter: Wong Ka Kui
- Producers: Beyond, Kunihiko Ryo

Chinese name
- Traditional Chinese: 海闊天空
- Simplified Chinese: 海阔天空
- Cantonese Yale: Hói fut tīn hūng
- Literal meaning: 'Sea Vast Sky Clear'
Transcriptions
Standard Mandarin
- Hanyu Pinyin: Hǎi kuò tiān kōng
- Wade–Giles: Hai^{3} k‘uo^{4} t‘ien^{1} k‘ung^{1}
- IPA: [xàɪ kʰwô tʰjɛ́n kʰʊ́ŋ]
Yue: Cantonese
- Yale Romanization: Hói fut tīn hūng
- Jyutping: hoi2 fut3 tin1 hung1
- IPA: [hɔj˧˥ fut̚˧ tʰin˥ hʊŋ˥]

Music videos
- Music video (Rock Records edition) on YouTube
- Music video (WEA edition) on YouTube

"Boundless Oceans, Vast Skies" (Chinese: 海闊天空; Cantonese Yale: Hói fut tīn hūng; lit. 'Sea Vast Sky Clear') is a song by the Hong Kong rock band Beyond. It was released for their studio album Rock and Roll (樂與怒; Lohk yúh nouh) on 14 May 1993, and remains massively popular. The song is an anthem of Cantonese rock music and one of Beyond's signature songs. In 2022, it became the first Cantonese song to record over 100 million views on YouTube.

It has been adopted for several events in Cantonese-speaking regions, such as the Artistes 512 Fund Raising Campaign for the 2008 Sichuan earthquake, and most prominently as the unofficial anthem of the 2014 Hong Kong protests.

== Background ==
Ka Kui was inspired by his trip to Africa in 1990 (after which he also wrote one of his most popular songs "Amani" ("Peace" in Swahili)). Its theme—personal freedom and the pursuit of dreams—flowed from his disillusionment with the music industry. It was written to celebrate the tenth anniversary of the band's formation. However, Ka Kui died on 30 June 1993, around two months after the song's release. It went on to gain critical acclaim and commercial success.

=== Release ===
The song has been also translated as "Under a Vast Sky", "Ocean Wide Sky High", "Vast Seas, Clear Skies", and "Clear Skies, Vast Ocean". The 1993 Taiwanese album sharing the Chinese name of the song officially translates the title of the song as "Hold On to My Dream".

Beyond recorded a Japanese version, "Haruka naru yume ni ~Far away~" (遥かなる夢に 〜Far away〜; literally "A Faraway Dream").

== Covers ==
In the 2003 Hong Kong movie Truth or Dare: 6th Floor Rear Flat, the song was performed live by Teresa Carpio, where it was interpreted as the sacrifice a mother had made for her son.

In 2010, Cai Xiuqing (蔡岫勍) performed the song for China's Got Talent, earning her third place. In 2012, Hong Kong a cappella group Metro Vocal Group released a cover on their album No Borders.
