= Soler (band) =

Hong Kong-based rock duo

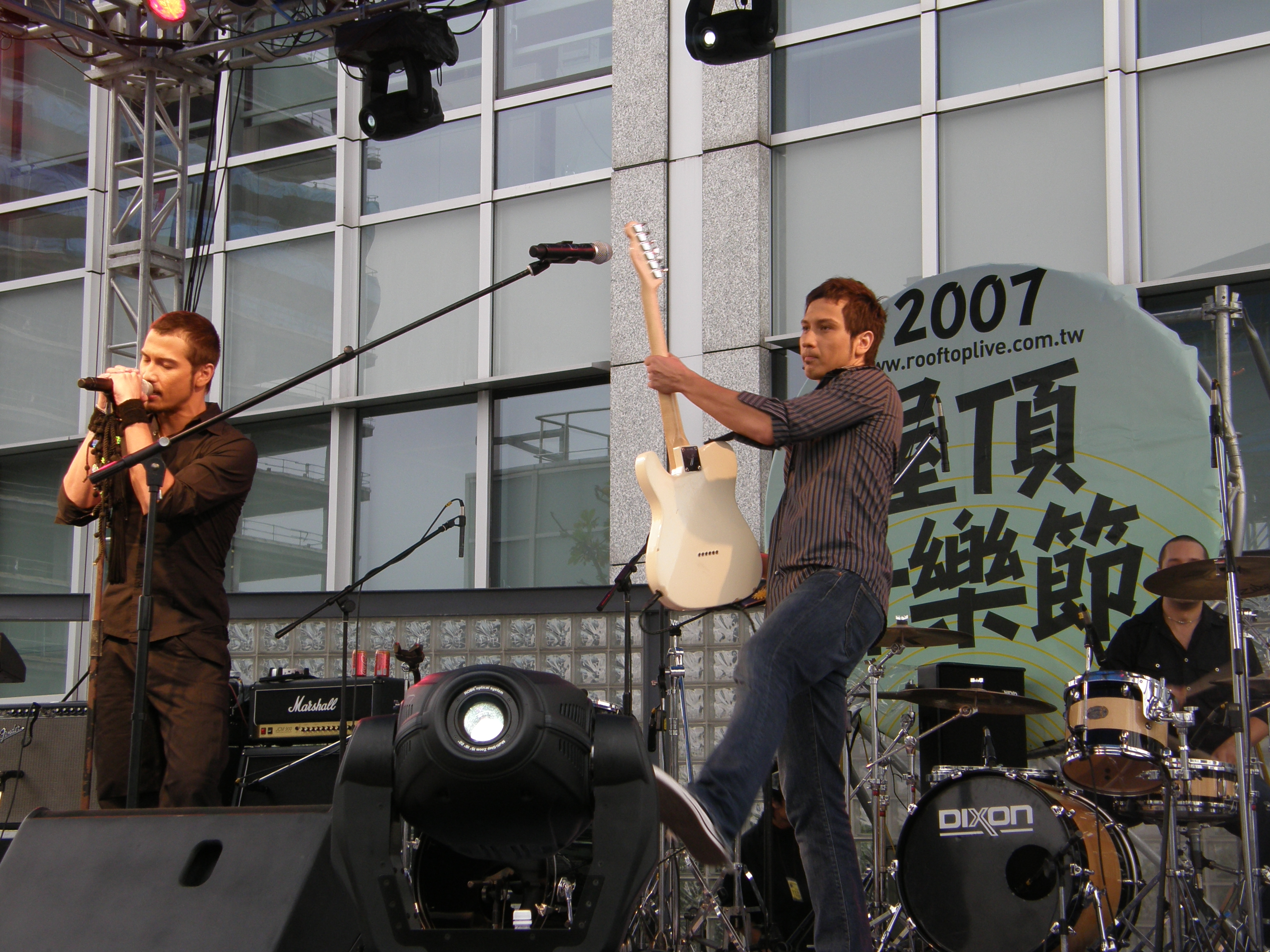

Background information
- Origin: Macau
- Genres: C-rock, Acoustic rock, Blues, Jazz, Mandopop, Italian pop, Hong Kong English pop
- Instrument(s): Guitar, Bass, Piano, Drums
- Years active: 2005–present
- Labels: K-Town Music
- Members: Julio Acconci; Dino Acconci

Soler is a Hong Kong–based rock duo originally from Macau formed by twin brothers Julio Acconci (vocals/bass) and Dino Acconci (vocals/guitar), Soler made their Hong Kong debut in early 2005.

== Biography ==
Julio and Dino Acconci were born on 9 September 1972 in Macau to an Italian father and a Karen (Myanmar) mother. They spent their childhood in Macau, The twins were raised Roman Catholic – attended Yuet Wah College, an all-boys' Roman Catholic secondary school in Macau. They later moved to Italy to pursue their studies and began to develop their music career. Later on, Soler was officially formed and became professional musicians signing to EMI Italy in 1996 with the release of their first single in Europe.

Prior to their debut in Hong Kong, they returned to Macau in 1999.

In 2001 Beyond's guitarist Paul Wong was searching for a guitarist to join his new rock band HANN, and Dino was invited over to Hong Kong for an audition. Dino's friendship with Paul soon led to Paul discovering Dino had a twin, Julio, who was in Julio's own words 'tagging along' to practices, but only after Paul mistook Julio for Dino. The idea of 'Soler' turning professional was a result of peer pressure from the friends of the Acconci brothers, who all echoed the same message – that it was a waste of their vocal talent if they didn't at least give Hong Kong a crack. Soler soon turned professional when offered a contract with a new music label after a member of the audience was fascinated with one of their live gigs in Hong Kong.

== Career ==
Prior to their 2005 debut, as an underground band which performed many live gigs, Soler has over the years developed a musical style that blends rock, soul and folk into one. Their music could best be described as folk rock with a bit of soul. Soler's live performances have had electrifying effects on Hong Kong's usually timid and reserved audience.

Soler is also currently the only band from Macau producing Cantonese songs in Hong Kong. The brothers can speak several languages, including English; Cantonese, the official language of Macau; Mandarin; Italian; Portuguese; and Spanish. Dino can also speak a little bit of French. They mainly perform in English, Cantonese and Mandarin but also include Italian and Portuguese in their repertoire.

On 15 July 2005, Soler released their debut album "Stereo" (雙聲道) which stormed the charts. The album includes songs sung in Cantonese alongside songs in English, with even a few sung in Mandarin. Their debut album sold so well in Hong Kong that Soler moved quickly to release their second album "Intuition", a Mandarin album, only 5 months later (on 19 December 2005), whilst juggling marketing duties, advertisements and Radio and TV appearances all in the same few months.

Beyond's guitarist Paul Wong, is also a big fan of Soler. Prior to Soler's debut, Dino was a band member of the group HANN, a band formed by Paul Wong when he went solo. Wong has also helped to pen lyrics to some of Soler's Cantonese songs, most notable the hit single "Tsunami", a song depicting the uphill struggle Soler went through before they became successful.

On 7 July 2007 they performed at the Chinese leg of Live Earth in Shanghai.

They are also hosts and main actors in English Made Easy 2011 and the third season in 2017.

== Debut ==
Soler's Hong Kong debut in early 2005 greatly exceeded their own expectations. The Acconci brothers were initially worried that, like their debut in Italy, their Eurasian ancestry would make it difficult for the Hong Kong locals to accept them, although people of mixed or full foreign appearance are usually received with interest rather than rejection by the Chinese people of Hong Kong. However, to their surprise Soler was a storming success – as soon as their first song "Soul Lost" (失魂) was aired on radio, listeners sat up and took notice of the 'gweilo band who sang in Cantonese'. With their popularity soaring, Soler became extremely busy as they were surrounded by the media and paparazzi, but with that Soler have also remained modest. They are fondly known to the media as "The Italian twins band", and it is now very common to hear their songs on Hong Kong radio channels, as well as seeing them make regular appearances on TV, print media and radio interviews.

Commercial Radio 903 D.J. Inti, who hosts a popular weekly rock music programme on Saturday evenings, has been credited as one of the first people to help unearth the talented duo by inviting them onto her show "Band Time" (組BAND 時間) on 18 May 2005, a time when Soler was still not yet well known to the Hong Kong public. Inti's radio programme "Band Time" introduces overseas band music as well as introducing local Hong Kong underground bands with interviews.

=== Contract dispute and bankruptcy ===
Soler was a recording group with Hummingbird Music, however due to artistic differences, Soler left the company and signed to BMA Records. Hummingbird Music sued the group for not fulfilling the contract, which the court ruled Soler must pay the record company HK$6 Million in reparations including accrued interests. In 2012, the record company filed Soler for bankruptcy. On 21 November 2012, Soler was declared bankrupt.

== Discography ==
- Un Posto Per Noi (1997)
- Tears in Your Hands (1998)
- Stereo (雙聲道) (15 July 2005)
- Intuition (直覺) (19 December 2005)
- Dragon Tiger Gate (龍虎門) (EP) (27 July 2006)
- X2 (9 September 2007)
- Unplugged at Kafka (9 September 2008)
- Canto (9 April 2009)
- Vivo (3 November 2010)
- Evolution (2018)

== Concerts ==
Soler held their first live concerts on 27 and 28 December at Kowloon Bay, Hong Kong.

Soler held a concert at the Hong Kong Coliseum in Hung Hom on 25 April 2006. They invited as guest performers Paul Wong, Ryan Hui and Karen Mok.

On 31 October 2010, Soler performed with an eight piece band from Sicily, Italy called The OmniArt Ensemble at the 24th Macau International Music Festival.

Soler did a round of concerts for VIVO Tour on 12 November 2010 at Rotunda One Hitec, Hong Kong and 19 November 2010 at Legacy Taipei. A follow-up tour "VIVO, Live goes on" continued the album promotion tour with smaller gigs in different cities from China to Taiwan to Malaysia. And was ended with the concert "When Summer Ends—A Gathering" in Legacy, Taipei on 21 September 2011.

In 2011, Soler began touring with Lo Tai Yo in the Love Melody 2100 Tour, playing a significant part in the concerts with a rock setting together with Tony Wong from the Taiwan rock band "Monkey Pilot". The tour kicked off in Beijing, China on 2 July 2011, scheduled to run all the way into the summer of 2012, with stops in Shanghai, Chengdu, Guangzhou, Shenzhen, Hong Kong and more.

On May 25, 2015, Soler is guest performer at the 8th Annual Fairchild Radio Songwriter's Quest in Toronto, Canada. Noted physician and composer and long time SQ contestant, Dr. Ian Pun will present his cooking dubstep song "Digital Spareribs" 数字排骨.

== Awards ==
- On 1 January 2006 at the 2005 CRHK Annual Music Awards, Soler were awarded the 2005 Best Group Newcomer Gold Award, following them were electronica group Pixel Toy (Bronze Award) and pop group Krusty (Silver Award).
