= Tai Chi (band) =

Hong Kong rock band

- Origin: Hong Kong
- Genres: Cantopop
- Members: Patrick Lui, Joey Tang, Ernest Lau, Eddy Sing, Ricky Chu

Tai Chi (太極) is a Hong Kong rock band formed in Hong Kong in 1985 by Patrick Lui (lead vocalist), Albert Lui (lead vocalist), Joey Tang (guitarist), Gary Tong (keyboardist), Ernest Lau (guitarist), Eddy Sing (bass guitarist and backing vocal), and Ricky Chu (drummer). The band split in 1995 and reunited in 2005.

The band was part of Hong Kong's 1980s "Band Boom" era, along with Fundamental, Beyond, Tat Ming Pair, Blue Jeans, Small Island, Raidas, Citybeat. Tai Chi are known for their catchy melodies.

== Members ==
- Patrick Lui (lead and backing vocals)
- Joey Tang (guitar, backing and lead vocals)
- Ernest Lau (guitar, backing vocals)
- Eddy Sing (bass guitar, backing vocals)
- Ricky Chu (drums, percussion)

== Past members ==
- Albert Lui (lead and backing vocals, left the band and migrated to Canada in 1993)
- Gary Tong (keyboards, piano, backing vocals, deceased in 2021 due to heart attack)

== Hit Songs ==
- 暴風紅唇 (Stormy red lips)
- 紅色跑車 (Red sports car)
- 他 (Him)
- 迷途 (Stray)
- 禁區 (Restricted area)
- 欠 (Owe)
- 全人類高歌 (Human race sing together)
- 想 (Want)
- 留住我吧 (Let me stay)
- 沉默風暴 (Silent storm)
- 樂與悲 (Happy and sad)
- 一切為何 (What's happened to everything?)
- 頂天立地 (Upright)
- Crystal
- 每一句說話 (Every word you said)
- 一個戀愛故事 (A love story)
- 一生不再說別離 (Never say goodbye again)
- 我們的八十年代 (Our 80's)
