= Yip Sai Wing =

Hong Kong musician

- Born: 19 August 1963 (age 62); British Hong Kong
- Occupation: Musician
- Years active: 1983–present
- Spouse: Zhang Weiling (m. 2011)
- Partner: Hui Wan Shan (1995–2002)
- Children: 1

Chinese name
- Traditional Chinese: 葉世榮
- Simplified Chinese: 叶世荣
Transcriptions
Standard Mandarin
- Hanyu Pinyin: Yè Shìróng
Yue: Cantonese
- Jyutping: Yip9 Sai3wing4
- Musical career
- Genres: Rock, Cantopop
- Instrument(s): Drums, vocals, percussion
- Labels: Fei Lok Records
- Formerly of: Beyond

Yip Sai Wing (born 19 August 1963) is a Hong Kong musician, best known as the drummer and co-founder of the rock band Beyond, formed with the lead vocalist Wong Ka Kui.

== Biography ==
Yip Sai Wing (叶世荣), born on August 19, 1963, in Hong Kong, is a Hong Kong male singer and musician, as well as the drummer and co-founding member of the rock band Beyond. In 1983, he formed the band Beyond with Wong Ka Kui and others, taking on the role of the drummer and percussionist. During his time with the band, Sai Wing contributed to many classic songs, including Boundless Oceans, Vast Skies (海阔天空), Glorious Years (光辉岁月), Truly Love You (真的爱你), No More Hesitation (不再犹豫), I Like You (喜欢你), Goodbye Ideal (再见理想), Complete Possession (完全的拥有), Lover (情人), and Footprints of the Past (旧日的足迹), etc..

Sai Wing attended several schools in his early years, including Salesian School, Salesian English School, Islamic Dharavi Memorial Secondary School, and New Method College. During his high school years, he was introduced to British rock music. Encouraged by his school and family, he began learning to play the drums and formed a band with his friends. After graduating from the pre-university program at New Method College, he failed to get into university and began working in the insurance industry as a broker at Tugu Insurance Company.

It was at a music store that he met Wong Ka Kui, and they became friends after discovering they both liked David Bowie. Later, Yip Sai Wing played drums while Wong Ka Kui played guitar, and the two joined various bands together. In 1983, to participate in a band competition, they, along with two friends, Deng Wei Qian (also known as Wu Lin, English name William) and Li Rong Chao, officially formed the band Beyond. After several lineup changes, they were eventually joined by bassist Wong Ka Keung (Wong Ka Kui’s brother)and lead guitarist Wong Koon Chung, which led to their manager, Chan Kin Tim, bringing them into the Hong Kong music.

After years of hard work, Beyond became one of the most influential bands in Hong Kong.In 2003, Beyond won the "Best Original Film Song" at the 23rd Annual Hong Kong Film Awards for "Vast Skies" (長空 or "Chang Kong"), which was written by Yip and Wong Ka Keung.

Starting from 2002, he started to develop his career in mainland China. He married Chinese model Zhang Weiling in 2011.

== Discography ==
- Beautiful Time Machine (EP) (美麗的時光機器) (2001)
- Remember You (EP) (2003)
- Leaves Turned Red (EP) (2005)
- Mercy (EP) (2009)

== Filmography ==
- The Fun, the Luck & the Tycoon (1989)
- Happy Ghost IV (1990)
- Beyond's Diary (1991)
- Party of a Wealthy Family (1991)
- Human Pork Chop (2001)
- Modern Cinderella (2002)
- A Wicked Ghost III: The Possession (2002)
- Bust Family (2004)
