= Wong Ka Keung =

Hong Kong musician

Steve Wong
- 黃家強
- Born: Wong Ka Keung; 13 November 1964 (age 61); Sham Shui Po, Kowloon, British Hong Kong
- Education: Secondary 5, Hong Kong Christian College (香港基教書院)
- Occupations: Musician; singer; songwriter; record producer
- Years active: 1984–present
- Spouse: Makiko Mizuguchi (m. 2006)
- Children: 2
- Relatives: Wong Ka Kui (brother)

Chinese name
- Traditional Chinese: 黃家強
- Simplified Chinese: 黄家强
Transcriptions
Standard Mandarin
- Hanyu Pinyin: Huáng Jiāqiáng
Yue: Cantonese
- Jyutping: Wong4 Ga1koeng4
- Musical career
- Genres: Rock; Cantopop; Mandopop
- Instruments: Vocals; bass guitar; guitar
- Label: East Asia Star Light (東亞星光)
- Formerly of: Beyond; Picasso Horses

Steve Wong Ka Keung (Chinese: 黃家強; born 13 November 1964) is a Hong Kong musician, singer, songwriter, and the bassist for the rock band Beyond. He is also the younger brother of lead vocalist and rhythm guitarist Wong Ka Kui, who died in 1993.

== Life and career ==
=== 1964–1999: Early life and Beyond ===
Wong was born on 13 November 1964 in Sham Shui Po, Kowloon and his ancestry traces back to Taishan, Guangdong, He was born and grow up with his family in So Uk Estate, Sham Shui Po. He studied in Tsung Tsin Primary School, Good Counsel Catholic Primary School, and Hong Kong Christian College.

He played music with Kubert Leung in a band. In late 1983 he joined Beyond to replace the band's original bassist Lee Wing Chiu (李榮潮). From the album Modern Stage (現代舞台)'s release in 1988, Wong began singing on some tracks, notably "Cold Rain Night" (冷雨夜) with lyrics by him and music by his brother Wong Ka Kui.

In June 1993, his brother Wong Ka Kui died in an accident in Japan. In 1994 Beyond released the album 2nd-Floor Band Room (二樓後座) and from then lead guitarist Paul Wong and he received the role of Beyond lead vocalist and main songwriter.

In late 1999, Beyond announced their launch of solo career. In 2002 Wong formed the group Picasso Horses with several young musicians and then signed a contract with Universal Records to cultivate bands.

=== 1999–present: Solo career ===
Wong is also a songwriter for many artists, including Leo Ku, Eason Chan, Amanda Lee, Jordan Chan, Faye Wong, etc.

In July 2009, Wong and Paul Wong ran three continuous sessions of concert in Hong Kong Coliseum despite private discord between them.

Wong held "Wong Ka Keung It's Alright Live Concert" on 4 to 5 June 2013, in Kowloonbay International Trade & Exhibition Centre.

Wong was the manager for the rock duo Soler, but they stopped their collaboration due to discord.

In December 2015, Wong attended BPA's 3rd annual dinner, sang Beyond’s signature works "Love You" (喜歡你) and "Glorious Years" (光輝歲月) with a couple of civil servants and took a photo with former chief executive Leung Chun Ying, leading to controversy from some netizens.

After that, Wong became a spokesman for a Gionee advertisement where a 3D projected image of his brother Wong Ka Kui appeared and they hugged each other, resulting in the second controversy from fans.

== Personal life ==
He is now married to Makiko Mizuguchi from Japan, and they have two sons.

== Discography ==
- BeRightBack (BRB) (2002)
- Picasso Horses (2004)
- Ta Ta (2007)
- Wong Ka Kui Memorial Album (2008)
- Incense (2015)

== Filmography ==
- Sworn Brothers (1987)
- The Fun, The Luck & The Tycoon (1989)
- Happy Ghost IV (1990)
- Beyond's Diary (1991)
