= The Fun, the Luck & the Tycoon =

1990 Hong Kong film by Johnnie To

- Film poster

Chinese name
- Traditional Chinese: 吉星拱照
- Simplified Chinese: 吉星拱照
Transcriptions
Standard Mandarin
- Hanyu Pinyin: Jí Xīng Gǒng Zhào
Yue: Cantonese
- Jyutping: Gat1 Sing1 Gung6 Ziu3
- Directed by: Johnnie To
- Screenplay by: Hoi Tik
- Based on: Coming to America by Eddie Murphy
- Produced by: Catherine Hun
- Starring: Chow Yun-fat; Sylvia Chang; Nina Li Chi; Lawrence Cheng
- Cinematography: Horace Wong
- Edited by: Wong Ming-gong
- Music by: Lo Tayu; Fabio Carli
- Production company: Cinema City
- Distributed by: Golden Princess Amusement
- Release date: 18 January 1990
- Running time: 86 minutes
- Country: Hong Kong
- Language: Cantonese
- Box office: HK$20,292,057

The Fun, the Luck & the Tycoon is a 1990 Hong Kong comedy film directed by Johnnie To. It starred Chow Yun-fat, Sylvia Chang, Nina Li Chi and Lawrence Cheng. It is an adaptation of Coming to America.

== Synopsis ==
Lam Po Sang (Chow Yun-fat) was born into a wealthy family. He is the richest man in Hong Kong, rich enough to build a space station. Sang lives in a luxury villa served by many maids. He is envied and worshiped by millions. However, he does not enjoy his lifestyle. He also does not want to follow his grandaunt's (Ouyang Sha-fei) arranged marriage between him and his cousin Cindy (Nina Li Chi) because his property would belong to her. He just wants to live a happy life. While his grandaunt was not home, Sang disguises as a civilian and runs away.

At a charity gala, Sang work as a handyman where he meets Hung Yeung-yuk (Sylvia Chang), the younger sister of Hung Tung-tung Food Company's boss Mr. Hung (Ha Yu). Sang was attracted by Yuk's wisdom and beauty and he falls in love. Sang becomes an employee at their restaurant to get close to Yuk with the help of his loyal butler Fatso (Wong San). This causes Hung's plan to match-make her sister with wealthy man Jimmy Chiu (Lawrence Cheng) to fail.

With his new life, Sang becomes energetic. While working at the restaurant, he gets to know the smart little kid Rocky (Wong Kwan-yuen) and four strong-willed brothers (Beyond) whom are his colleagues. Sang wins Yuk's love. However, Jimmy, Cindy and Tung do not let things go smoothly, and when Sang's grandaunts expose Sang who he is to Yuk, she storms off. After many misunderstandings, Sang and Yuk end up together.

== Cast ==
- Chow Yun-fat as Lam Po Sang / Stink (2 roles)
- Sylvia Chang as Hung Yeung-yuk
- Nina Li Chi as Cindy Chan
- Lawrence Cheng as Jimmy Chiu
- Wong Kwan-yuen as Rocky Ma
- Ha Yu as Hung Tung-tung
- Beyond as Restaurant workers
- Wong San as Fatso
- Wong Man as Sang's mother
- Ouyang Sha-fei as Sang's grandaunt
- Bowie Wu as Barrister Cheung
- Raymond Wong as Priest (cameo)
- James Lai as Jeweller (cameo)
- Fung King-man as Doctor
- Ho Ling-ling as Rocky's girlfriend
- Yue Ming as Sang's office manager
- Alan Chui Chung-San as Robber (cameo)
- Lo Hoi-pang as Senior Policeman
- Yeung Yau-cheung as Junior Policeman
- Albert Lo as Customer at restaurant (brief cameo)
- Leung Oi as Customer at restaurant (brief cameo)
- Cheng Siu-ping as Woman at office
- English Tang
- Ho Wan as Party guest
- Leung Hak-shun as Party guest
- Ho Chi-moon as Party guest
- Lee Wah-kon

== Reception ==
=== Critical ===
Andrew Saroch of Far East Films rated the film 3 out of 5 stars and writes "The Fun, The Luck And The Tycoon is not hilarious or particularly side-splitting, but the humour is such that it hits the mark in a subtle manner. Therefore this is an agreeable Chow Yun-fat comedy that is mostly successful in its modest ambitions."

=== Box office ===
The film grossed HK$20,292,057 at the Hong Kong box office during its theatrical run from 18 January to 15 February 1990.

== See also ==
- Chow Yun-fat filmography
- Johnnie To filmography
