= Sworn Brothers =

1987 Hong Kong film by David Lai

- Film poster

Chinese name
- Traditional Chinese: 肝膽相照
- Simplified Chinese: 肝胆相照
Transcriptions
Standard Mandarin
- Hanyu Pinyin: Gān Dǎn Xiàng Zhào
Yue: Cantonese
- Jyutping: Gon1 Daam2 Song1 Ziu3
- Directed by: David Lai
- Screenplay by: David Lai; Manfred Wong
- Produced by: Sammo Hung
- Starring: Andy Lau; Cheung Kwok-keung
- Cinematography: Raymond Lam; Ardy Lam
- Edited by: Peter Cheung
- Music by: Chris Babida; Sherman Chow
- Production companies: Golden Harvest Productions; Bo Ho Films
- Distributed by: Golden Harvest
- Release date: 12 March 1987
- Running time: 88 minutes
- Country: Hong Kong
- Language: Cantonese
- Box office: HK$8,480,443

Sworn Brothers (Chinese: 肝膽相照) is a 1987 Hong Kong action crime drama film. It is directed by David Lai and stars Andy Lau and Cheung Kwok-keung as stepbrothers on opposite sides of the law as a triad and cop, respectively.

== Plot ==
Lam Ting-yat is orphaned as a child and raised by police officer Uncle Pau alongside Pau's son, Ngan Kwok. The two grow up as close friends. Kwok later returns to Hong Kong after training at Scotland Yard and becomes a police inspector, while Ting joins the triads under crime lord Yeung Tung-hoi. Although they are now on opposite sides of the law, they remain close. Kwok is assigned to investigate Yeung's gang, with corrupt sergeant Shek, known as "Portuguese", working under him. Among the case files, Kwok finds one concerning Ting.

Ting plans to leave the triads and emigrate. He meets a singer, Peggy, and the two fall in love. Without Pau's knowledge, Ting pays HK$100,000 towards his heart surgery. Meanwhile, rival gangster Fung demands a larger share of Yeung's business. Ting is sent to confront him, and a fight follows in which Ting's associate Ka-lok is killed. Ting shoots Fung. It is later revealed that Yeung had staged an earlier attempt on his own life in order to manipulate Ting into taking action.

Shek later finds evidence linking Ting to Fung's death and attempts to arrest him. During a confrontation on a rooftop, Peggy is taken hostage. Ting kicks Shek from the building and escapes with Peggy. Kwok is subsequently demoted because of his association with Ting.

Ting prepares to flee to Brazil with money provided by Yeung. He visits Pau before leaving, but Shek arrives and forces his way inside. Pau suffers a heart attack, and Ting kills Shek before taking Pau to hospital. Pau asks Kwok to help Ting leave Hong Kong. When Kwok later confronts Ting in a car park, Ting recalls their childhood dream of becoming police officers. Kwok allows him and Peggy to leave.

As their ship leaves Hong Kong, Yeung's associate Fat Ko shoots Ting in the back. Ting falls into the water and the ship explodes, killing Peggy. Ting survives and is imprisoned. He decides to testify against Yeung and leave his criminal life behind. During an attack in prison, Ting is stabbed while Kwok suffers a severe brain injury after coming to his aid. Pau suffers another heart attack after seeing the condition of both men.

Ting escapes from custody and attempts to kill Yeung, but is recaptured. At trial, Ting and Yeung face numerous charges relating to smuggling and murder. Ting is convicted and sentenced to death, while Yeung is acquitted. After the verdict, Kwok, wearing a neck brace, embraces Ting and gives him an opportunity to shoot Yeung. Ting kills Yeung, then drops the gun as he and Kwok raise their hands together.

== Cast ==
- Andy Lau as Lam Ting-yat
- Cheung Kwok-keung as Inspector Ngan Kwok
- Siu Hung-mui as Peggy / Man-man
- Bill Tung as Uncle Ngan Pau
- Peter Yang as Yeung Tung-hoi
- Wong Chi-keung as Fat Ko Wai
- Kan Tat-wah as Sergeant Shek / Portuguese
- Fung Yuen-chi as Fung
- Ka Lee as Chan Kwo
- Chin Kar-lok as Ka-lok
- Wan To-ming
- Eddy Ko as Commander Chan Chung-hon
- Pauline Wong as Yeung Lai-chu
- Tony Au as Doctor
- Pan Yun-sang as Fung's henchman
- Shum Lo as Chu's father in-law
- Lui Tat
- Jackson Ng
- Cheung Wing-cheung
- Paul Fonoroff as man in court
- Cheung Yuen-wah as Peggy's colleague
- Yu Kwok-lok as Fung's henchman
- Ng Kwok-kin as policeman
- Chow Kam-kong as Yeung's thug
- Fei Pak as Policeman
- Chui Fat as thug
- Yuen Tak as thug

== Theme song ==
- What is Between (當中究竟)
  - Composer: Lik Fung
  - Lyricist: Lo Kwok-chim
  - Singer: Andy Lau

== Box office ==
The film grossed HK$8,480,443 at the Hong Kong box office during its theatrical run from 12 March to 2 April 1987 in Hong Kong.

== See also ==
- Andy Lau filmography
- Sammo Hung filmography
