= List of awards and nominations received by Leo Ku =

Leo Ku awards
Award	Won
Commercial Radio Hong Kong Ultimate Song Chart Awards	24
IFPI Hong Kong Sales Awards	2
Jade Solid Gold Top 10 Awards	18
Metro Radio Mandarin Music Awards	3
Metro Showbiz Hit Awards Awards	23
MTV Asia Awards	1
RTHK Top 10 Gold Songs Awards	22
Sprite Music Awards	11
Hong Kong TVB8 Awards	3
- Total
Awards won	107

Leo Ku is a cantopop singer in Hong Kong. Since his debut in 1994, he has released twenty studio albums and six compilation albums.

His most successful songs to date are "Love and Honesty" (Nobita), "Never Too Late" (Human) and "The Genius and the Idiot". "Never Too Late" has received a lot of praise because its lyrics that reflects on how people in Hong Kong often neglect their family and friends due to their busy schedule. The song alone won more than eighteen awards between 2004 and 2005 including RTHK Golden Song of the Year and Hit Song of the Year from Metro Showbiz Hit Awards. Because of the popularity of the song, Leo had won the Gold Award of Best Male Artist in Ultimate Song Chart Award in 2004, in which Eason Chan, his competitor, failed to get any award that year.

== Commercial Radio Hong Kong Ultimate Song Chart Awards ==
The Ultimate Song Chart Awards Presentation (叱咤樂壇流行榜頒獎典禮) is a cantopop award ceremony from one of the famous channel in Commercial Radio Hong Kong known as Ultimate 903 (FM 90.3). Unlike other cantopop award ceremonies, this one is judged based on the popularity of the song/artist on the actual radio show. Leo has won twenty-two of these awards since 1995 including a gold for Ultimate Male Artist in 2004.

Year	Award	Work	Result	Ref.
1995	Ultimate New Male Artist Awards	Leo Ku	Gold Award	
1996	Ultimate Top 10 Songs	Actually I...I...I (其實我...我...我)	Won	
1998	Ultimate Male Artist	Leo Ku	Silver Award	
1999	Ultimate Top 10 Songs	Have You For One Day (有你一天)	Won (#6)	
2000	Ultimate Top 10 Songs	Holiday in Rome (羅馬假期)	Won (#3)	
2004	Ultimate Top 10 Songs	Killing Move (必殺技)	Won (#2)	
2004	Ultimate My Favorite Song	Killing Move (必殺技)	Won	
2005	Ultimate Top 10 Songs	Nobita (大雄)	Won (#6)	
2005	Ultimate Male Artist	Leo Ku	Gold Award	
2005	Ultimate My Favorite Male Artist	Leo Ku	Won	
2005	Ultimate My Favorite Song	Love and Honesty (愛與誠)	Won	
2006	Ultimate Top 10 Songs	The Genius and the Idiot (天才與白痴)	Won (#2)	
2006	Ultimate Male Artist	Leo Ku	Silver Award	
2007	Ultimate Song Award (至尊歌曲大獎)	Never Too Late (愛得太遲)	Won	
2007	Ultimate My Favorite Song	Never Too Late (愛得太遲)	Won	
2007	Ultimate Album	Human (我生)	Won	
2007	Ultimate Male Artist	Leo Ku	Silver Award	
2007	Ultimate 4 Channels Album Award (四台聯頒大碟)	Human (我生)	Won	
2008	Ultimate Top 10 Songs	Love Coming Home (愛回家)	Won (#4)	
2008	Ultimate Male Artist	Leo Ku	Silver Award	
2009	Ultimate Top 10 Songs	See You Next Time (下次再見)	Won (#3)	
2009	Ultimate Male Artist	Leo Ku	Silver Award	
2010	Ultimate Top 10 Songs	Era (時代)	Won (#8)	
2010	Ultimate Male Artist	Leo Ku	Bronze Award	

== IFPI Hong Kong Sales Awards ==
IFPI Awards is given to artists base on the sales in Hong Kong at the end of the year.

Year	Award	Work	Result	Ref.
2005	Top 10 Best Selling Cantonese Albums	勁歌‧金曲 新曲+精選	Won	
2005	Top 10 Best Selling Cantonese Albums	Star Track 星戰	Won	
2005	Top 10 Best Selling Cantonese Albums	"Leo Ku in Concert 2005" 古巨基05勁歌‧金曲演唱會	Won	
2005	Top 10 Best Selling Local Artists	Leo Ku	Won	
2005	Best Selling Local Male Artist	Leo Ku	Won	
2006	Top 10 Best Selling Cantonese Albums	Human	Won	
2006	Top 10 Best Selling Local Artists	Leo Ku	Won	
2007	Top 10 Best Selling Local Artists	Leo Ku	Won	
2008	Top 10 Best Selling Cantonese Albums	Guitar Fever	Won	
2008	Top 10 Best Selling Local Artists	Leo Ku	Won	

== Jade Solid Gold Top 10 Awards ==
The Jade Solid Gold Songs Awards Ceremony(十大勁歌金曲頒獎典禮) is held annually in Hong Kong since 1984. The awards are based on Jade Solid Gold show on TVB.

Year	Award	Work	Result	Ref.
1995	The Most Popular New Male Artist	Leo Ku	Gold Award	
1997	The Top 10 Songs	Enjoy Yourself Tonight(歡樂今宵)	Won	
1998	The Top 10 Songs	Have You For One Day (有你一天)	Won	
1999	The Top 10 Songs	Holiday in Rome (羅馬假期)	Won	
1999	The Most Popular Mandarin Song	Making A Wish(許願)	Bronze Award	
2003	The Most Popular Internet Song	Killing Move (必殺技)	Won	
2004	The Top 10 Songs	Love and Honesty (愛與誠)	Won	
2005	The Top 10 Songs	The Genius and the Idiot (天才與白痴)	Won	
2005	The Four Channels Song	The Genius and the Idiot (天才與白痴)	Won	
2006	The Top 10 Songs	Never Too Late (愛得太遲)	Won	
2006	The Best Song	Never Too Late (愛得太遲)	Won	
2006	The Most Popular Advertisement Song	Never Too Late (愛得太遲)	Silver Award	
2007	The Most Popular Internet Song	Love Coming Home (愛回家)	Won	
2008	The Top 10 Songs	眼睛不能沒眼淚	Won	
2008	Most Popular Male Artist	Leo Ku	Won	
2009	The Top 10 Songs	"Earth is Dangerous" (地球很危險)	Won	
2009	Most Popular Male Artist	Leo Ku	Won	
2010	The Top 10 Songs	義海豪情	Won	
2010	Most Popular Male Artist	Leo Ku	Won	

== Metro Radio Mandarin Music Awards ==
Year	Award	Work	Result	Ref.
2006	Best Mandarin Male Artist Award	Leo Ku	Won	
2006	Best Presentation Award 新城國語力演繹獎	Leo Ku	Won	
2006	Hit Mandarin Song	Sleeping Beauty (睡美人)	Won	

== Metro Showbiz Hit Awards ==
The Metro Showbiz Hit Awards (新城勁爆頒獎禮) is held in Hong Kong annually by Metro Showbiz radio station. It focus mostly in cantopop music.

Year	Award	Work	Result	Ref.
1994	Hit New Male Artist	Leo Ku	Gold Award	
1997	Most Leap Male Artist	Leo Ku	Won	
1999	Top One Hit Karoke Song	Holiday in Rome (羅馬假期)	Won	
2003	Hit Song	Killing Move(必殺技)	Won (#9)	
2004	Hit Male Artist	Leo Ku	Won	
2004	Hit Golden Song	Love and Honesty (愛與誠)	Won	
2004	Hit Karoke Song	Love and Honesty (愛與誠)	Won	
2004	Hit Album	Nobita (大雄)	Won	
2004	My Favorite Song	Love and Honesty (愛與誠)	Won	
2005	Hit Male Artist	Leo Ku	Won	
2005	Hit Song	Jade Solid Gold (勁歌金曲); The Genius and the Idiot (天才與白痴)	Won	
2005	Most Hit Song	The Genius and the Idiot (天才與白痴)	Won	
2005	Hit Album	Star Track (星戰)	Won	
2006	Hit Male Artist	Leo Ku	Won	
2006	Hit Song	Shower (花灑); Never Too Late (愛得太遲)	Won	
2006	Most Hit Song	Never Too Late (愛得太遲)	Won	
2006	Hit Song of the Year	Never Too Late (愛得太遲)	Won	
2006	Hit Karoke Song	Never Too Late (愛得太遲) – Duet with Vivian Chow	Won	
2006	4 Channels Award	Never Too Late (愛得太遲) – Duet with Vivian Chow	Won	
2007	Hit Male Artist	Leo Ku	Won	
2007	Hit Song	Love Coming Home (愛回家)	Won	
2007	Most Hit Song	Love Coming Home (愛回家)	Won	
2007	My Favorite Male Artist	Leo Ku	Won	
2009	Hit Song	Earth is Very Dangerous (地球很危險)	Won	
2009	Best Male Artist	Leo Ku	Won	
2009	Asia Most Popular Artist	Leo Ku	Won	
2009	Global Hit Artist	Leo Ku	Won	
2010	Most Air Song	"Era" (時代)	Won	
2010	Hit Male Artist	Leo Ku	Won	

== MTV Asia Awards ==
The MTV Asia Awards is the Asian equivalent to the MTV Awards in United States. Since its debut in 2002, the show gives recognition to the Asian artist as well as international icons for their achievement in fashion, film and music. There was no award ceremony in 2007. Leo Ku has won one award in the "Most Popular Hong Kong Artist" category in 2008.

Year	Award	Work	Result	Ref.
2008	Most Popular Hong Kong Artist	Leo Ku	Won	

== RTHK Top 10 Gold Songs Awards ==
The RTHK Top 10 Gold Songs Awards Ceremony(十大中文金曲頒獎音樂會) is held annually in Hong Kong since 1978. The awards are determined by Radio and Television Hong Kong based on the work of all Asian artists (mostly cantopop) for the previous year. Leo has won twenty-one of these awards.

Year	Award	Work	Result	Ref.
1995	Best New Male Artist Prospect Award	Leo Ku	Gold Award	
1995	Favorite New Artist Award	Leo Ku	Won	
1995	Media Favorite Award	Leo Ku	Won	
1997	Top 10 Songs Award	Enjoy Yourself Tonight(歡樂今宵)	Won	
1997	Top 10 Best Artist Award	Leo Ku	Won	
1997	Most Leap Male Artist Award	Leo Ku	Silver Award	
1999	Best Original Song	Weather Changes(天气会变)	Won	
1999	Best Mandarin Song Award	Make a Wish (許願)	Silver Award	
2004	Most Improved Artist Award	Leo Ku	Won	
2004	Global Chinese Golden Song	Love and Honesty (愛與誠)	Won	
2004	Top 10 Best Artist Award	Leo Ku	Won	
2004	Top 10 Songs Award	Love and Honesty (愛與誠)	Won (#2)	
2005	Top 10 Best Artist Award	Leo Ku	Won	
2005	Top 10 Songs Award	The Genius and the Idiot (天才與白痴)	Won (#9)	
2006	Best Artist Award	Leo Ku	Won	
2006	Top 10 Songs Award	Never Too Late (愛得太遲)	Won (#2)	
2006	Global Chinese Golden Song	Never Too Late (愛得太遲)	Won	
2006	Four Radio Channels Award – Media Favorite Award	Leo Ku	Won	
2008	Best Artist Award	Leo Ku	Won	
2008	Top 10 Songs Award	Love Coming Home (愛回家)	Won (#3)	
2009	Best Artist Award	Leo Ku	Won	
2010	The Top 10 Songs	Era (時代)	Won	

== Sprite Music Awards ==
Year	Award	Work	Result	Ref.
2004	Top 10 Songs (Hong Kong + Taiwan)	Love and Honesty (愛與誠)	Won	
2004	Best Presentation (最佳演繹歌手)	Leo Ku	Won	
2004	National Golden Song	Love and Honesty (愛與誠)	Won	
2005	Hong Kong Best Album	Jade Solid Gold (勁歌金曲)	Won	
2005	Top 10 Songs (Hong Kong + Taiwan)	Sleeping Beauty (睡美人)	Won	
2006	Top 10 Songs (Hong Kong + Taiwan)	Never Too Late (愛得太遲)	Won	
2006	National Golden Song	Never Too Late (愛得太遲)	Won	
2006	Hong Kong Best Male Artist	Leo Ku	Won	
2006	Hong Kong Best Album	Human (我生)	Won	
2007	Best Songs (Hong Kong + Taiwan)	Love Going Home (爱回家)	Won	
2007	Media Award (Hong Kong)	Leo Ku	Won	
2007	Best Male Artist (Hong Kong)	Leo Ku	Won	

== Hong Kong TVB8 Awards ==
Year	Award	Work	Result	Ref.
2003	Most Recommended Song	天上人間	Won	
2005	Most Favorite Cantonese Song from General Audience 全球觀眾最愛粵語歌曲獎	Jade Solid Gold (勁歌金曲)	Won	
2006	Most Hit Cantonese Song 全球熱愛粵語歌曲	一生何求	Won	
