= Priscilla Chan (singer) =

Hong Kong pop singer (born 1965)

Priscilla Chan Wai-han 陳慧嫻
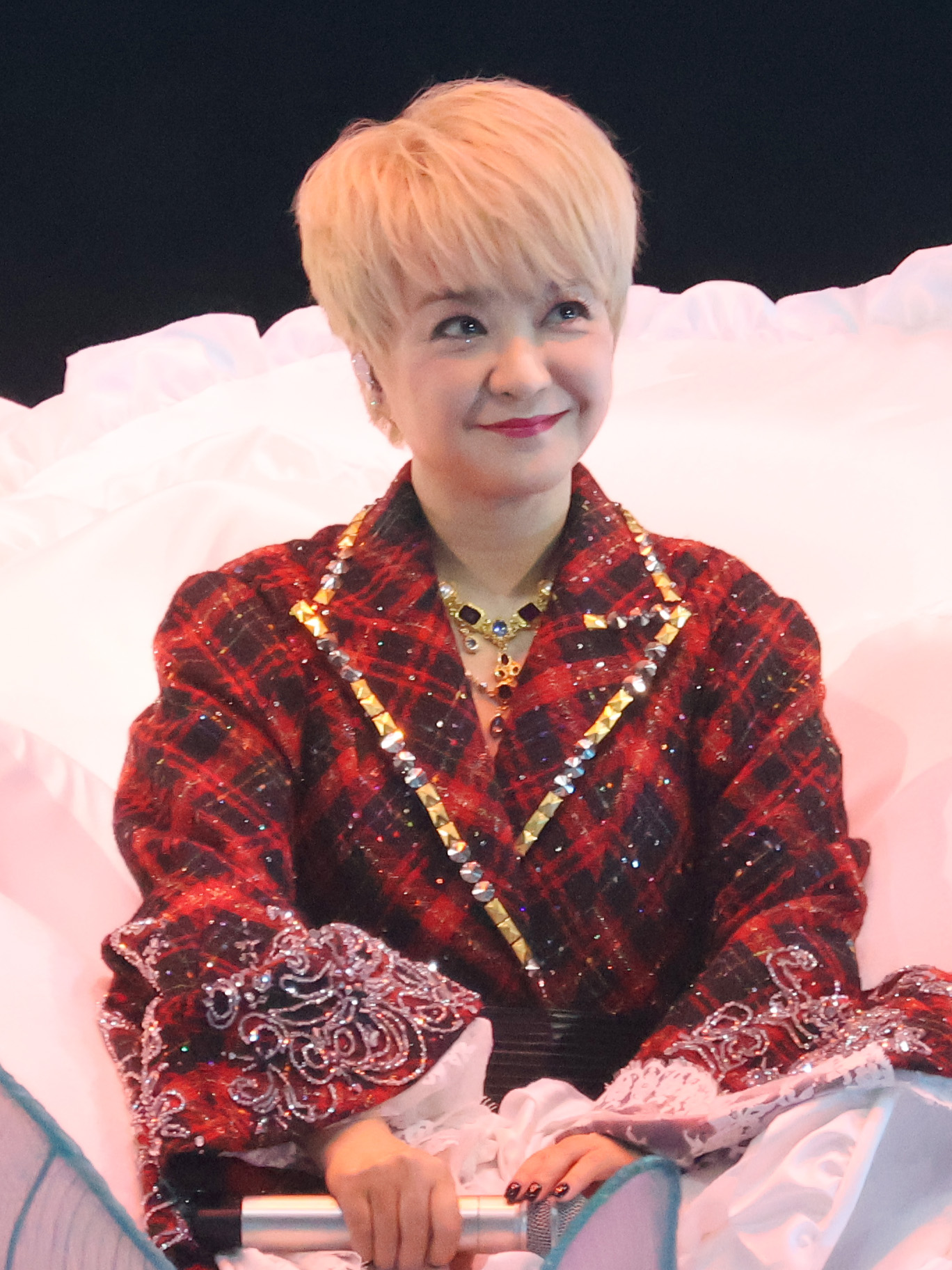
- Chan in 2025

Background information
- Also known as: PC
- Born: Chan Wai-han; 28 July 1965 (age 61); British Hong Kong
- Genres: Cantopop; Mandopop
- Occupation: Singer
- Years active: 1983–2001, 2003–2004, 2007–present
- Label: Various: Fiori Productions Ltd. (1983–1986); PolyGram Records Ltd., Hong Kong (1986–1997); Cinepoly Records Ltd. (1998–2001); Universal Music Hong Kong (2003–2004); International Entertainment Corporation (2007–2008); PolyGram Records Ltd., Hong Kong (subsidiary of Universal Music Hong Kong) (2013–2022); Emperor Entertainment Group (2022–present)
- Website: Priscilla Chan on Facebook; Priscilla Chan on Instagram; Priscilla Chan on Weibo (in Chinese)

Chinese name
- Traditional Chinese: 陳慧嫻
- Simplified Chinese: 陈慧娴
Transcriptions
Standard Mandarin
- Hanyu Pinyin: Chén Huìxián
Yue: Cantonese
- Yale Romanization: chàhn waih hàahn
- Jyutping: Can4 Wai6Haan4
- IPA: Cantonese pronunciation: [tʃʰɐn^{21} wɐi^{22} haːn^{21}]

Priscilla Chan Wai-han (Chinese: 陳慧嫻; Jyutping: Can4 Wai6 Haan4; pinyin: Chén Huìxián; born 28 July 1965) is a Hong Kong singer. She is known for her contralto singing voice and her clear, technically skilled, and emotion-rich vocals.

Debuted in 1983 at age 18 from a trio album project named Girls' Magazine (少女雜誌), which was formed by Fiori Productions Ltd. (法安利製作有限公司), with the hit "Forgotten Promise" (逝去的諾言), Chan began her solo singing career in 1984 and has since remained popular for more than three decades. Chan signed to PolyGram Records, Hong Kong (寶麗金) in 1986 and reached her career peak between the late-1980s and mid-1990s, and scored several hits particularly in the 1980s, most remarkably including "Silly Girl" (傻女) from her 1988 album Priscilla's Love (嫻情), as well as her signature song, "Thousands of Songs" (千千闋歌), one of the all-time Cantopop classics, from her 1989 best-selling farewell album Forever Your Friend (永遠是你的朋友), which also elevated Chan to the top tier of Hong Kong singers.

Chan continued to release albums during her study, and resumed her full-time singing career in 1995 after graduation, achieving a huge success for her comeback album titled Welcome Back. Chan's work remained relatively popular throughout the 1990s, eventually falling out of favour in the early 2000s when she was overtaken by a new generation of Cantopop singers. Chan made a few brief comebacks in the 2000s, including the one in 2003 when she signed to Universal Music Hong Kong, performed a concert with two shows, and released an album entitled Love Knot (情意結). Feeling frustrated upon poor record sales, Chan stepped back from the Hong Kong musical industry and embarked on her live performances at private functions and concerts overseas and in mainland China, where her popularity was further boosted.

After a decade of hiatus, Chan officially returned to the Hong Kong Cantopop scene in 2013, when she signed to Universal Music Hong Kong again with the relaunch of the PolyGram label in Hong Kong. Chan then successively released two cover albums, namely By Heart (2014) and Evolve (2015), and the compilation album Back to Priscilla (Back to Priscilla 嫻情三十) (2014) commemorating the 30th anniversary since her debut. Chan also performed in two major concert series, namely the "Back to Priscilla: 30th Anniversary Concert 2014 Live" (2014) and the "Priscilla-ism Live 2016" (2016) at the Hong Kong Coliseum, with world tours, live performances, and private functions mainly held in mainland Chinese cities, and sporadically in North America and Russia.

== Early life ==
Born in Hong Kong on 28 July 1965, Chan grew up as the eldest of three children (one younger sister and one younger brother). Her parents were senior governmental officials, and her father, Chan Ching-bo (陳澄波), was a former assistant director of Immigration at the Immigration Department of the Government of British Hong Kong, who was interested in music and indirectly developed her interest in singing. Chan attended Marymount Primary School and Marymount Secondary School in Happy Valley, Hong Kong, and had once been a secondary school fifth-form classmate with Sandy Lam, later also a Cantopop and Mandopop singer.

As a teenager, Chan would often take part in extracurricular activities. When Chan was still a primary six student, she already participated in the annual garden party, in celebration of Queen Elizabeth II's birthday, at the Government House held by the Government of British Hong Kong on behalf of the Marymount Primary School, and even shook hands with Sir Murray MacLehose, the then Governor of Hong Kong. Chan entered and received awards in speech contests during the Hong Kong Schools Speech Festival, as well as singing contests and events held internally in her secondary school and externally as joint-school functions, and was eventually got discovered by Angus Mak (麥偉珍, better known as 安格斯), who was an executive for the Fiori Productions Ltd. In 1983, Chan, in her fifth-form at age 18, was invited to audition by Mak and was soon arranged to release a compilation album named "Girls' Magazine" with Monica Chan and Luisa Maria Leitao (黎芷珊). At the same time, Chan continued her secondary education and was admitted to the Hong Kong Baptist College in 1985, majoring English studies.

== Career ==
=== 1983–1986: Years in the Fiori Productions Ltd. ===
Founders of the Fiori Productions Ltd., including Angus Mak, Jim Lee (李振權), and Tony Chiu (趙潤勤) who later also became Chan's manager, worked out the "Girls' Magazine" album which featured a youthful vibe that suited the young-girl and girl next-door image of the three members. Released in 1984, the debut album was a great success, and particularly the song "Forgotten Promise", composed as a Cantonese "short tune" (xiaodiao 小調) and sung by Chan, quickly became a hit, earning not only a platinum certification (over 50,000 unit sales) for the album, but also a speedy rise in Chan's popularity as a singer. On 30 June and 1 July 1984, the "Girls' Magazine" group participated in their first public concert entitled "Dragon and Tiger Talents in Concert" (龍虎群英演唱會), at the Hong Kong Coliseum with fellow musicians Anita Mui, Leslie Cheung, Deanie Ip, Elisa Chan (陳潔靈), the Tiger Team (小虎隊), William Hu (胡渭康), Suen Ming-kwong (孫明光), and Lam Lei (林利)). Following up the success in record sales and increased popularity, Fiori then arranged Chan's debut as a solo artist in August 1984, and released her first solo album titled Feelings of a Story (故事的感覺), also certified platinum, and the song "The Glass Window of Love" (玻璃窗的愛) was another chart-topping hit. The success of these two albums and two hits finally earned Chan a "Most Promising Newcomer Award" (最有前途新人獎), which was awarded in the 1984 RTHK Top 10 Gold Songs Awards (十大中文金曲頒獎音樂會). On 15 to 16 September 1984, Chan co-starred in a youth musical titled "First-love Quintet" (初戀五重奏) with four other female teen idols—namely Sandy Lam, Sandy Lamb (林姍姍), Sara Lee (李麗蕊), and Michelle Pau—at the Academic Community Hall (大專會堂) located in the Hong Kong Baptist College. In January 1985, Chan also made her Japanese debut with the release of the extended play "Thousand-Year Lover" (千年戀人; Japanese: 千年恋人) and another Japanese-Cantonese album of the same title in the name of "Girl's Magazine"; Chan even made appearance on Japanese music shows as promotion.

Back in Hong Kong, Chan took part in her first public concert as a solo artist, titled "Teen Idols in Concert" (青年偶像演唱會), at the Hong Kong Coliseum with Jacky Cheung, Lui Fong, Sandy Lam, and Sandy Lamb, on 13 to 14 August 1985. On 6 September 1985, Chan released her self-titled album "Priscilla" (陳慧嫻). Certified platinum, the album includes the chart-topping hit "Flower Shop" (花店), which its new version was released and included in Chan's cover album "By Heart" in 2014.

=== 1986–1990: Golden Age in the PolyGram Records Ltd., Hong Kong ===
In 1986, as the Fiori Productions Ltd. reorganised, Chan was signed as a full-time contract singer of the PolyGram Records Ltd., Hong Kong, the major music label which was also responsible for the release of Chan's aforementioned albums. At the same time, Chan quitted her Bachelor's studies at the Hong Kong Baptist College in order to be fully committed to her singing career. On 30 May, the album "Revolt" (反叛) appeared, which pushed her to new heights by adopting a Japanese-style teens image together with several popular tracks, including the leading track and disco hit "Dancing Street" (跳舞街), a cover version of Angie Gold's 1985 "Eat You Up" but based production wise, on Yōko Oginome's (荻野目洋子) version, titled "Dancing Hero (Eat You Up)" (ダンシング・ヒーロー (Eat You Up)); "Loving and/as Accident" (痴情意外); "Revolt" (反叛); "Hugging with Tears" (與淚抱擁); and "Love Me Once Again". "Dancing Street", in particular, was a huge success that not only topped the charts and was awarded the "Most Popular Disco Song" (Disco 最受歡迎歌曲) at the 1986 Jade Solid Gold Best Ten Music Awards Presentation held by TVB Jade, it is also regarded as one of the pinnacles of Chan's career. The album itself was certified double platinum (over 100,000 unit sales), and Chan also officially announced that she would complete her studies abroad after her recording contract signed with PolyGram Records was expired in 1990, a move that bewildered her fans and the industry.

Chan's fourth Cantonese studio album, "Change, Change, Change" (變、變、變) was released on 19 February 1987. Although her attempt to literally change her image into an elegant Audrey Hepburn-like style was failed, such that her hairstyle and outfit were once mocked as resembling to that of Chan Lap-ban (陳立品), the famous Hong Kong supporting actress of the 1950s to 1980s, the image itself remains a classic and the album sales still exceeded triple platinum in record sales with hits like "Greed, Greed, Greed" (貪、貪、貪) (a cover of Yōko Oginome's "Roppongi Junjōha"), "Change, Change, Change Change Change" (變、變、變變變) (a cover of Yū Hayami's (早見優) "Monday Shutdown"), and "Go!" (去吧！). On 24 July, Chan's first solo compilation album titled "Remix + Best Of" (Remix + 精選) was released.

Chan rebounded nicely in 1988 with the double platinum-certified album "Priscilla's Love" (嫻情), released on 15 January 1988, in which the chart-topping hit "Silly Girl" (傻女), a Cantonese rework version of the Spanish song "La Loca" by María Conchita Alonso, confirmed Chan's status as a serious contender in the golden age of Cantopop, as the song was awarded both the 1988 Jade Solid Gold Best Ten Music Awards and 1988 RTHK Top 10 Gold Songs Awards. The song, selected as one of the 40 greatest Cantopop songs of all time by the Hong Kong edition of Time Out magazine in 2016, is also Chan's personal favourite among her own works and the song which Chan thinks best describes herself. Starting from "Priscilla's Love" till "Forever Your Friend" (1989), Chan's retro-styled stage presence, accompanied by varied, vintage outfits and hatwears also became one of her most iconic images throughout her singing career. Following up the success of "Priscilla's Love", Chan then released a Mandarin-language album "Silly Girl" (傻女) which features "Silly Girl's Love" (傻女的愛), the Mandarin version of the song "Silly Girl".

Another Cantonese album "Autumn Colours" (秋色) appeared on 21 October 1988 and included a number of chart-toppers, such as "Joe le taxi", a cover version of the French singer Vanessa Paradis's 1987 hit of the same name; "When Will I See You Again?!" (幾時再見?!), a cover version of the American soul group The Three Degrees's 1974 song "When Will I See You Again"; and "It's A Small World" (人生何處不相逢), a three-week number-one song on the "Ultimate Song Chart" (叱咤樂壇流行榜) of channel Ultimate 903, Commercial Radio Hong Kong (CRHK) that also earned Chan the "Ultimate Female Singer: Silver Award" (叱咤樂壇女歌手銀獎) at the 1988 Ultimate Song Chart Awards Presentation held by CRHK. Together with songs like "Old Film at Midnight" (凌晨舊戲), and "The Earth Tracking" (地球大追蹤), a cover version of the Guinean singer Mory Kanté's "Yé ké yé ké" (1987), "Autumn Colours" was certified 4× platinum in record sales. Noteworthily, "It's A Small World" and "When Will I See You Again?!" are written on the theme of parting, constituting the series of farewell songs for Chan's hiatus as she would study abroad at Syracuse University.

1989, the year before Chan moved to New York State to pursue a bachelor's degree in Psychology at Syracuse University, was generally recognised as the pinnacle of her career. On 25 July, Chan released her farewell album "Forever Your Friend" (永遠是你的朋友), with the lead single "Thousands of Songs" (千千闋歌), a melancholic song about a parting couple. Also the Cantonese version of Masahiko Kondō's (近藤真彦) hit "Song of Sunset" (夕焼けの歌), "Thousands of Songs" was a song tailor-made for Chan who was about to suspend her musical career, with Cantonese lyrics written by Richard Lam (林振強). The song became very popular as soon as it was released, not only topping the musical charts of Hong Kong, especially the CRHK's "Ultimate Song Chart", on which the song occupied the number-one position for 3 weeks, it was also awarded the 1989 Jade Solid Gold Best Ten Music Awards, the 1989 RTHK Top 10 Gold Songs Awards, as well as the "My Favourite Ultimate Song Award" (叱咤樂壇我最喜愛的歌曲大獎) of the year at the 1989 Ultimate Song Chart Awards Presentation, winning with 2,715 votes from the live audience. Together with a series of farewell songs, including "Night Flight" (夜機), Chan's another great hit, the Cantonese version of the German singer Nicole Seibert's 1983 single "So Viele Lieder Sind In Mir", which was also awarded the RTHK Top 10 Gold Songs Awards of the same year; and the upbeat dance hit "Dancing Boy", a Cantonese rework from another Masahiko Kondō's song "Dancin' Babe" (1988), "Forever Your Friend" garnered enormous success as the album had sold over 350,000 copies (7× platinum) already only in the year 1989, finally becoming the best-selling record of Chan herself and that of the year 1989 in Hong Kong. Besides Chan's own popularity and the news of her suspension of career, some critics believe that the wave of mass migrations from Hong Kong in the late 1980s, prompted by events like the signing of the "Sino-British Joint Declaration" in 1984 and the 1989 Tiananmen Square protests and massacre, also contributed the emergence and accelerated popularity of Chan's songs like "It's A Small World" and "Thousands of Songs".

It is worth mentioning that, even though "Thousands of Songs" was more popular, at least in terms of record sales, than "Song of Sunset" (夕陽之歌), the theme song for the 1989 Hong Kong film "A Better Tomorrow III: Love & Death in Saigon" (英雄本色III夕陽之歌) and another Cantopop classic released by Anita Mui in September 1989 in her album "In Brasil" with Cantonese lyrics written by Keith Chan (陳少琪) (lyricist of Chan's "Night Flight"), "Thousands of Songs", the highly anticipated winner of the year's "Jade Solid Gold Best Ten Music Awards: Gold Award" (勁歌金曲頒獎典禮金曲金獎) presented by TVB, was lost to its counterpart "Song of Sunset" for the award, due to the closer commercial relations between TVB and Capital Artists (華星唱片), the label to which Mui was signed. Nonetheless, Chan's popularity was further promoted because of the album and elevated her to heights alongside peers including Leslie Cheung and Anita Mui; Chan was also awarded the "Ultimate Female Singer: Bronze Award" (叱咤樂壇女歌手銅獎) at the 1989 Ultimate Song Chart Awards Presentation. "Thousands of Songs" soon became Chan's most important and influential signature song and affirmed her status as a "Cantopop diva". Additionally, Chan held her first solo concert residency at the Hong Kong Coliseum from 28 August to 2 September 1989, entitled "Priscilla Chan in Concert" (陳慧嫻幾時再見演唱會; lit. Priscilla Chan's "When Will I See You Again" Concert), one of her most classic performances that also featured the farewell theme, with six shows rapidly sold out.

=== 1990–1994: Hiatus and years in the US ===
On 9 February 1990, Chan left Hong Kong for her study in the US; Michael Au (歐丁玉), her boyfriend and music director at PolyGram at that time, Jacky Cheung, one of her best singer friend since she was signed to PolyGram, her father and her fans saw her off at the Kai Tak Airport, where a large number of media reporters were also present. Chan was officially enrolled as an undergraduate student in August 1990. Although Chan originally planned to stop her musical career after graduation, in fact her singer contract with PolyGram still remained and was not completely over; after being persuaded by PolyGram staff and with Au's help, Chan continued recording new tracks in the US and had even made a few low-key returns to Hong Kong to record new Cantonese albums during winter and summer vacations in 1991–1994. On 26 March 1992, Chan released the album "Come Back" (歸來吧), in which tracks like "Drifting Snow" (飄雪), a chart-topper adapted from Yuko Hara's (原由子) 1991 hit "The Journey of the Flowers" (花咲く旅路); "black Tea House" (紅茶館), a cover version of Kouji Taira's (平浩二) "Bus Stop" (1972) and was awarded the 1992 RTHK Top 10 Gold Songs Awards; "Moon" (月亮), adapted from Taiwanese singer Mai Meng's (孟庭葦) 1991 hit "Look at the Face of the Moon" (你看你看月亮的臉); and "Come Back" (歸來吧), adapted from Taiwanese singer-songwriter Salsa Chen's (陳小霞) 1991 Taiwanese Hokkien song "Marionette" (傀儡尪仔) (Note: Chan's Cantonese cover version retains one of the song lyrics in the original Taiwanese Hokkien version: Chinese: 傀儡尪仔; Pe̍h-ōe-jī: Ka-lé ang-á; lit. 'Marionette (in the context of Taiwanese glove puppetry)' became a Soramimi in Cantonese that was deliberately misinterpreted as Chinese: 咖喱牛腩飯; Jyutping: Ga3lei1ngau4naam5faan6; lit. 'Curry beef brisket with rice' or simply Chinese: 咖喱牛腩; Jyutping: Ga3lei1ngau4naam5; lit. 'Curry beef brisket'.), still became hits and even classics. The album achieved a surprisingly good result of triple platinum certification despite the fact that Chan spent most of the time in the US with minimum publicity and promotion activities in Hong Kong.

On 15 October 1993, Chan released the album "Always By Your Side" (你身邊永是我), with the chart-topping hit "Jealousy", a cover version of Miyuki Nakajima's (中島美雪) "Jealousy, Jealousy" (ジェラシー·ジェラシー) (1993). The album, certified double platinum, was also a success, and Chan filmed a special music programme titled "Priscilla's Love in New York" (紐約嫻情) for TVB as promotion.

Decided to resume her musical career in 1994, Chan released the greatest hits album "Who Is My Love Today" (今天的愛人是誰) on 4 October in the same year, with two new tracks including the title song and chart-topping hit "Who Is My Love Today", adapted from Mariko Takahashi's (高橋真梨子) "Softly...Lovin' You" (そっと...Lovin' You) (1994).

Chan graduated from Syracuse University in the end of 1994 with First Class Honours (GPA 3.66/4.00). Besides her parents, Michael Au, who had already broken up with Chan around 1991, Au's wife, and Jacky Cheung attended Chan's graduation ceremony held in the Syracuse University's campus.

=== 1995–1997: Later years in the PolyGram Records Ltd., Hong Kong ===
By 1995, Chan has returned to the music industry in full force. However, as Chan recalled, she also started to feel disappointed and discouraged to the personnel changes of the PolyGram Records she returned to after her graduation in the US. Her initial return brought her back to the top of the charts with two albums: "Welcome Back" and "I Am Not Lonely" (我不寂寞), which were released on 23 February and 3 November 1995 respectively. Chan also starred in a CRHK radio drama titled "My Heart Never Dies" (我心不死) with Andy Lau (劉德華). "Welcome Back" was a huge success which topped the record sales chart for a record of six weeks in 1995. Songs like "Missing Love and Dust" (戀戀風塵), "It's Always Raining Tonight" (今天夜裡總下雨), "Missing You" (留戀) from the album "Welcome Back"; as well as "I'm Lonely" (我寂寞), which was awarded the 1995 RTHK Top 10 Gold Songs Awards, and "Drift" (飄), selected as the 10th song among the "1995 Ultimate Top 10 Songs" at the 1995 Ultimate Song Chart Awards Presentation, from the album "I Am Not Lonely", all became instant hits. The success of the two albums also earned Chan the "Top 10 Outstanding Artists Award" (十大優秀流行歌手大獎) in 1995 and 1996 at the RTHK Top 10 Gold Songs Awards.

Chan's 10-night concert residency, "Priscilla Chan in Concert '96" (雪映美白'96陳慧嫻演唱會) held in 1996 during the Lunar New Year period at the Hong Kong Coliseum reaffirmed her popularity with the public. Chan also released a well-received greatest hits album with new releases including the theme song for the concert, "Contented" (心滿意足). In the second half of 1996, Chan released another album "Problematic Woman" (問題女人) with the title track "Problematic Woman", seeking a change in image and musical style, but with generally negative responses. Chan also filmed a special music programme series titled "Wonderful Encounters in England" (英倫奇緣) in the UK for TVB as promotion. Nevertheless, tracks like "Wonderful Journey" (奇妙旅程) and "End of Fate" (緣了，就是完) still achieved considerable results and the former was awarded the 1996 Jade Solid Gold Best Ten Music Awards.

From 1997 onwards, Chan chose to keep a low profile in her career. She only released one Mandarin album "My Heart Is About To Fly Away" (心就要飛了) in March. Another two-night concert entitled "Musical Encounters with Priscilla and the Philharmonic" (慧嫻·港樂奇妙旅程'97演唱會) held in mid-March 1997 at the Hong Kong Coliseum with the Hong Kong Philharmonic Orchestra (HKPhil) made her the second pop artist ever to work with the HKPhil, after Jacky Cheung. A new track "Time For Two" (二人時間) was released as the concert's theme song.

=== 1998–2000: Years in the Cinepoly Records ===
With the signing of a new recording company, Cinepoly Records, Chan's fame started to fall. The death of her beloved cat, Remington, which she had been raising since she was studying in the US, in 1998 marked the start of the period when she found life difficult as the new recording company was also not working well for her. Her first album after signing to Cinepoly, "In Love For 2000 Hours" (愛戀二千小時) is a rare concept album in the Hong Kong Cantopop scene at that time and was also Chan's new attempt made in musical style, with hits like "Distance" (距離) and "Relish" (玩味). On 18 May 1999, Chan released "This Is Love" (正視愛) with the title track "This Is Love" (正是愛). Another version, with two Mandarin songs added, was released in August the same year for entering the mainland Chinese market. Although Chan personally was not satisfied with the record sales result, the album still achieved sales of more than 15,000 units when it was first released in Hong Kong in 1999, a good sales performance at that time.

On 29 August 2000, Chan released "Good For You" (為你好), a retro-styled album directed by Michael Au, her long-time musical director starting from 1986, with the title track of the same name. However, the album was under-promoted and Chan, feeling discouraged, began to step back from the Hong Kong Cantopop scene.

=== 2001–2006: Love Knot and hiatus ===
After the early termination of her contract with Cinepoly in 2001, Chan was diagnosed anxiety disorder around 2002, also because of the breaking up with her second boyfriend, Michael Cheung (張卓文), in addition to her cat's accidental death.

In 2003, signing temporarily to Universal Music Hong Kong, Chan made a comeback with an album named "Love Knot" (情意結) and a two-night concert at the Hong Kong Coliseum. The album features the title track "Love Knot", "Tomorrow Is Another Day" (明日有明天), a duet track named "Philandering" (拈花惹草) with Jade Kwan (關心妍), as well as a remake version of Chan's classic "Silly Girl" entitled "The Silly Girl's New Clothes" (傻女的新衣), directed by Chan Fai-young (陳輝陽), who cooperated with Chan for the first time. However, as the album sales of only 8,000 units was way below her expectation, mostly because of the market downturn after the 2003 outbreak of the severe acute respiratory syndrome (SARS), illegal online downloading and piracy, Chan decided to retreat once again; she also criticised the general preference of Cantopop audience at that time, who she believed were only interested in admiring the artists' images but not in truly appreciating their music. However, she reiterated her desire to continue singing as many loyal fans still remained around the world.

=== 2007–2012: Short comeback in Hong Kong, developing in the mainland Chinese music scene ===
In 2007, Chan signed temporarily with EC Music under International Entertainment Corporation (國際娛樂有限公司) until its closure in 2008, and released a new live album recorded at one performance of a two-night benefit concert held at the Kowloonbay International Trade & Exhibition Centre in Hong Kong in 2008. A new track named "Ring Finger" (無名指) was released as the concert's theme song.

From 2008 to 2012, Chan held concert tours in various mainland Chinese cities, including Shanghai, Guangzhou, Chengdu, Chongqing, and Nanning. During her tours in mainland China, Chan released a few Mandarin singles, such as "Asia" (亞細亞) (2010), one of the theme songs of the 2010 Asian Games held in Guangzhou, and "Let Love Blooms" (讓愛綻放) (2012), a commemorative track for the fourth-year anniversary of the 2008 Sichuan earthquake.

=== 2013–2022: Returning to the relaunched PolyGram Records in Hong Kong ===
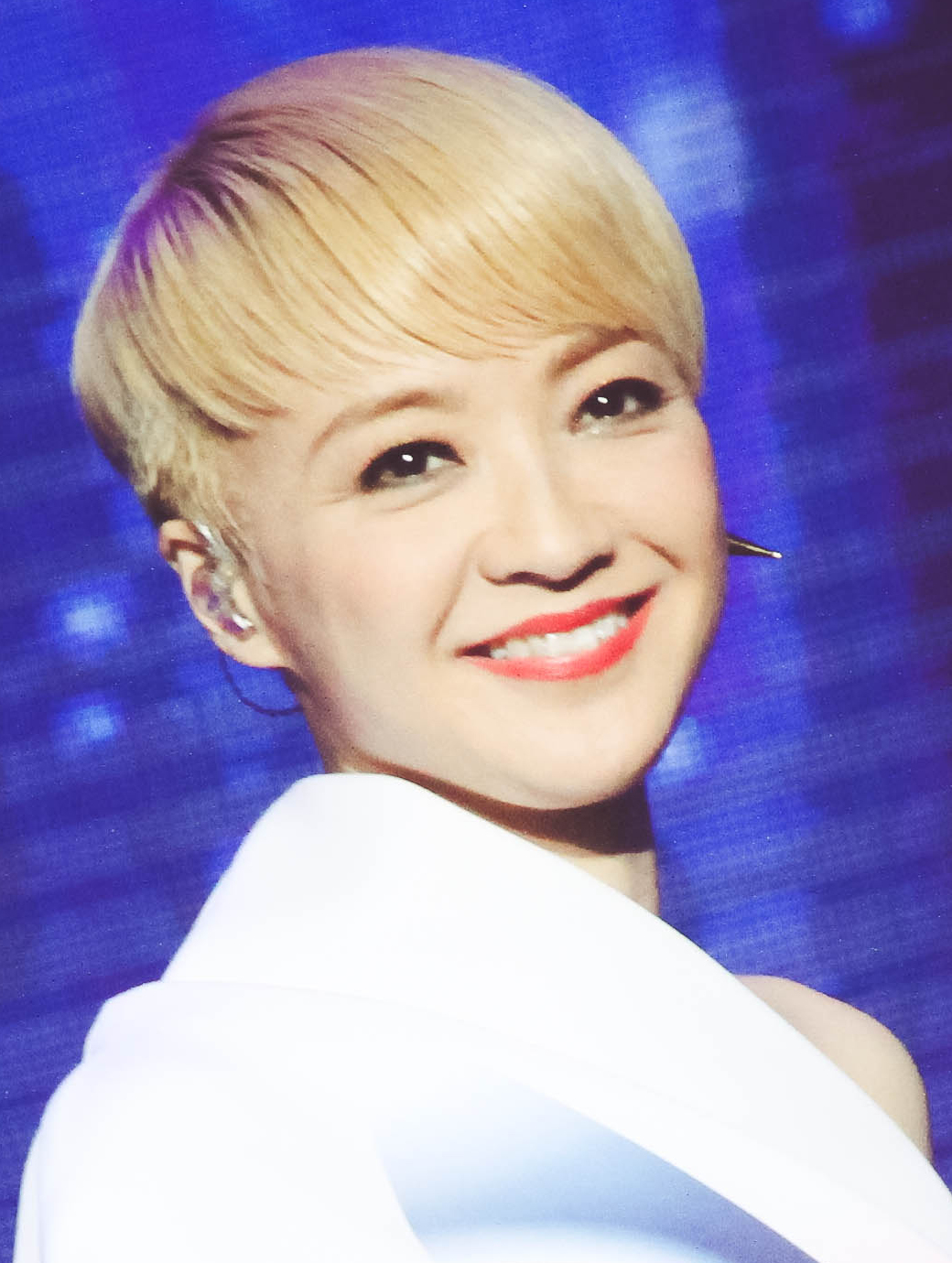
Chan in 2014

On 16 April 2013, Chan signed with Universal Music Hong Kong again, with the relaunch of the PolyGram label. On 28 August 2013, Chan participated in the "PolyGram Forever Live Concert" held at the Hong Kong Convention and Exhibition Centre with former PolyGram pop stars like Alan Tam (譚詠麟), Hacken Lee (李克勤), and Shirley Kwan (關淑怡).

Chan then released "By Heart", a cover album and her first album after returning to the relaunched PolyGram Records, on 7 April 2014. The album features Chan's cover of 10 songs produced in the former PolyGram Records. The compilation album that commemorates the 30th anniversary since her debut, "Back to Priscilla" (Back to Priscilla 嫻情三十), appeared on 17 June, before she held her 30th-anniversary commemorative concert at the Hong Kong Coliseum from 19 to 21 June, with Jacky Cheung and Joey Yung (容祖兒) as live guests. Kandy Wong (黃山怡), a Hong Kong singer who is regarded as a lookalike of Chan, also watched Chan's concert and the two took a photo together. Chan then performed at the "PolyGram Forever Live Concert in Singapore" organised in Singapore Indoor Stadium on 19 July.

The popularity of Chan and her classic "Silly Girl" increased after a Hong Kong singer Don Li (李逸朗) covered the song in an exaggeratedly emotional and "tearful" way and became viral in early 2015. Chan announced her extension of singer contract to PolyGram records and signed her management contract to Universal Music Hong Kong on 9 April 2015. She then made her one night concert performing her greatest hits at the Resorts World Genting, Malaysia in July 2015. On 19 November, Chan released another cover album titled "Evolve", which included remakes of 10 of her own classics. The album was certified gold (7,500 unit sales for cover albums) in only two days.

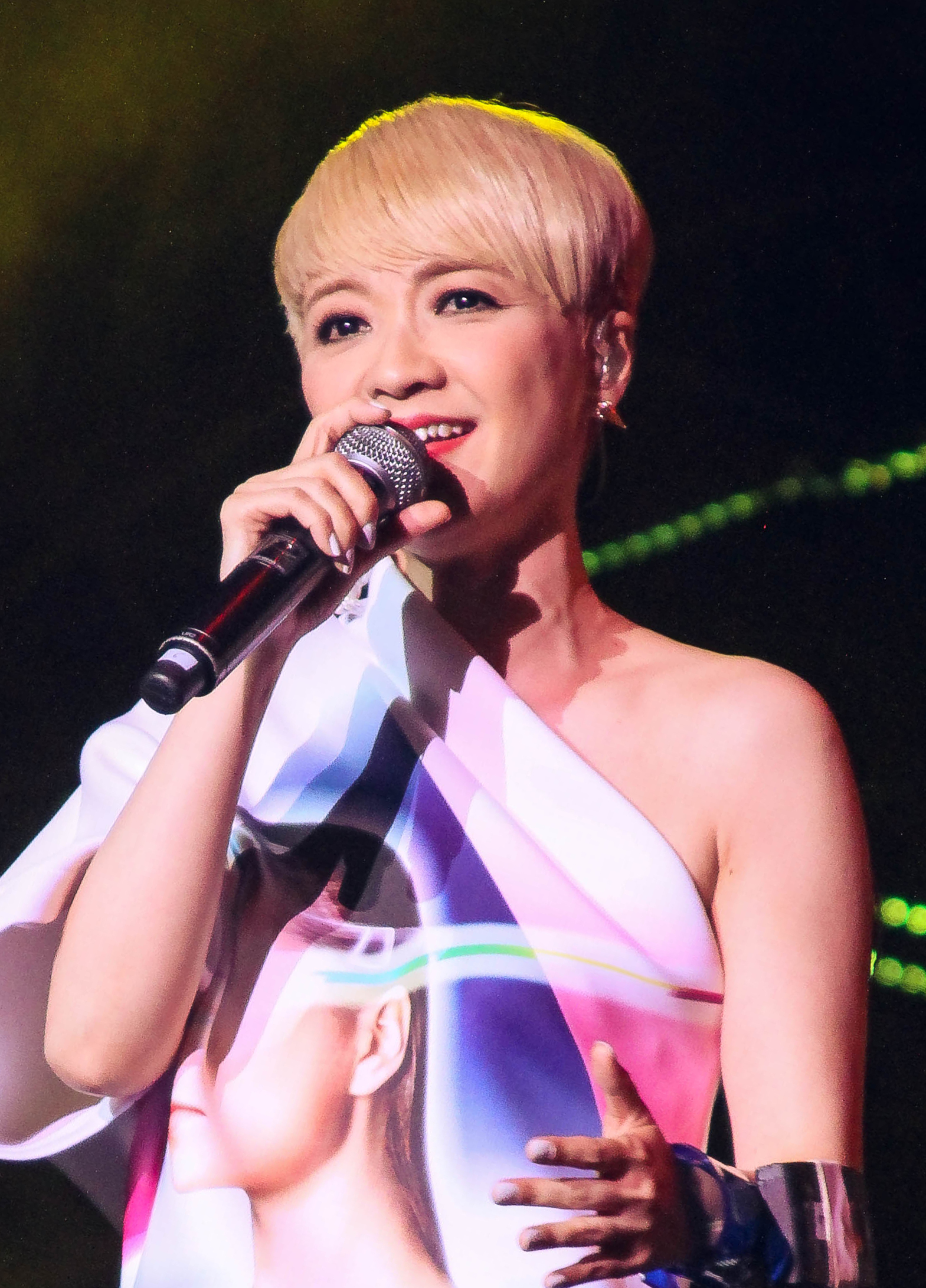
Chan performing in Singapore, 2014

Chan held her fifth solo concert residency, "Priscilla-ism Live 2016", at the Hong Kong Coliseum from 4 to 7 March 2016. Live guests include Hacken Lee, Kenny Bee (鍾鎮濤), Alan Tam, Andy Hui (許志安), and Grasshopper (草蜢). Soon after the concert, Chan began her "Priscilla-ism" tour in mainland Chinese cities, until 2020.

In 2018, the year that marks the 60th-anniversary of the deceased Cantopop superstar Danny Chan (陳百強), Priscilla Chan, as a Universal Music Hong Kong artist, covered Danny Chan's 1983 hit "Just Loving You" (偏偏喜歡你), which was included in the commemorative cover album "The World Sings Danny Chan" (環球高歌陳百強), along with 9 other Danny Chan's classics covered by 9 different Universal Music Hong Kong artists. On 9 September, Chan also performed "Just Loving You" in the concert commemorating Danny Chan's birthday on 7 September 1958.

In May 2022, Priscilla Chan's contract with Universal Music Hong Kong was terminated.

=== 2022–present: Emperor Entertainment Group ===
On 28 July 2022, her 57th birthday, Priscilla Chan officially announced that she has joined the Emperor Entertainment Group (EEG). Mani Fok, the manager of EEG, and EEG artists such as Simon Yam, Kara Wai, Hacken Lee, Joey Yung, Leo Ku, Nicholas Tse, and Twins filmed a short video to express their congratulation and welcoming messages. In September 2022, Chan announced her participation in the mainland Chinese pop music reality show, Singing With Legends 4, produced by Dragon Television. On 26 October 2022, Universal Music Hong Kong released a 3CD greatest hits album entitled "Isshōkenmei" (一生懸命), which includes two brand new Cantonese singles, "Early Flight" (早機) and "Return Home" (回家).

On 12 August 2023, Chan announced her participation as one of the judges for the Hong Kong singing talent show Midlife, Sing & Shine 2, produced by TVB. The show was aired on TVB Jade starting from 10 September 2023 and ended on 24 March 2024. On 19 November 2023, Chan attended TVB's "TVB Anniversary Gala Show 2023" and served as a guest performer.

On 12 November 2024, Chan announced that she would held her sixth solo concert residency, "The Fabulous 40 Priscilla Live in Hong Kong", at the Hong Kong Coliseum on 21, 22, 24, and 25 January 2025. For this occasion, Chan released two brand new Cantonese singles, "To My Dear Dearest" (給親愛的親愛) and "Accompany" (陪伴). On 23 December 2024, it was announced that her Hong Kong Coliseum solo concert residency would be adding an extra night of performance on 26 January, and an online live concert "Priscilla Chan The Intimate Live" was held on 23 December 2024 to promote the Hong Kong Coliseum concert. On 6 January 2025, it was announced that Chan's solo concert residency would be adding another extra night of performance on 30 January.

== Personal life ==
Chan has had three publicly admitted loving relationships over the course of her adult life. The first one was with her music producer Michael Au from 1984 until some time around 1991, after Chan went for college in the US. Au has since married and has two children. Chan admitted that Au was still the one who loved her the most and her most beloved lover among her three ex-boyfriends, and their relationship had already been transformed into that between family relatives since their break-up.

After Au, in 1994, Chan dated an artist designer Michael Cheung who also worked for Chan's image during her musical career at that time, and the relationship ended in 2002.

Chan's latest boyfriend was Dr. Tony Tse (謝國麟), a medical doctor who was her fan and they knew each other when Chan sought medical treatment for her anxiety disorder and related health issues in the second half of 2002. Chan once publicly expressed her love to Tse in her Hong Kong concert series held in 2003. However, both agreed to end the 5-year relationship in July 2007. The cause of the break-up, according to Chan, was personality differences.

Chan is a cat-lover. She once raised 9 cats at the same time. Chan's favourite singers include The Carpenters and Danny Chan.

Many believed that Chan made a wrong decision to leave the music industry at the peak of her career for college in 1989. Yet, Chan disagreed. She considered singing was an important part of her, but she valued education more. Furthermore, she reiterated the reason for getting a college degree was to fulfill her promise to her parents. The years studying in the US was also one of her happiest times in life.

Since 2017, Chan lives in the Beverly Hills (比華利山別墅) in the Tai Po District (大埔區).

== Concert tours in Hong Kong ==
- 陳慧嫻幾時再見演唱會 Priscilla Chan in Concert (28 August–2 September 1989)
- 雪映美白'96陳慧嫻演唱會 Priscilla Chan in Concert '96 (15–24 February 1996)
- 慧嫻·港樂奇妙旅程'97演唱會 Musical Encounters with Priscilla and the Philharmonic (14–15 March 1997)
- 陳慧嫻珍演唱會 Priscilla Chan Live (4–5 July 2003)
- 陳慧嫻活出生命II演唱會 Priscilla Chan Live 2008 (8–9 February 2008)
- Back to Priscilla 陳慧嫻三十周年演唱會 Back To Priscilla: 30th Anniversary Concert 2014 Live (19–21 June 2014)
- 陳慧嫻Priscilla-ism演唱會 Priscilla-ism Live 2016 (4–7 March 2016)
- The Fabulous 40 Priscilla Live in Hong Kong 陳慧嫻演唱會 (21, 22, 24, 25, 26, 30 January 2025)

== Discography ==
=== Albums ===
Year	Title	Native name	Language(s)	Publisher	Notes/Ref.
1984	Girls' Magazine	少女雜誌	Cantonese	Fiori Productions Ltd., PolyGram Records Ltd.	
1984	Feelings of a Story	故事的感覺	Cantonese	Fiori Productions Ltd., PolyGram Records Ltd.	
1985	Thousand-Year Lover EP	千年恋人	Japanese	Phonogram/Philips, PolyGram Records Ltd.	
1985	Thousand-Year Lover	千年恋人	Japanese/Cantonese	Phonogram/Philips, PolyGram Records Ltd.	
1985	Priscilla	陳慧嫻	Cantonese	Fiori Productions Ltd., PolyGram Records Ltd.	
1986	Revolt	反叛	Cantonese	PolyGram Records Ltd.	
1987	Change, Change, Change	變、變、變	Cantonese	PolyGram Records Ltd.	
1987	Remix + Best of	Remix + 精選	Cantonese	PolyGram Records Ltd.	
1988	Priscilla's Love	嫻情	Cantonese	PolyGram Records Ltd.	
1988	Silly Girl	傻女	Mandarin	PolyGram Records Ltd.	
1988	Autumn Colours	秋色	Cantonese	PolyGram Records Ltd.	
1988	Priscilla Chan Remix	—N/a	Cantonese	PolyGram Records Ltd.	
1989	Forever Your Friend	永遠是你的朋友	Cantonese	PolyGram Records Ltd.	
1989	Priscilla Chan in Concert	幾時再見演唱會	Cantonese/English	PolyGram Records Ltd.	
1990	Get Up and Dance	—N/a	Cantonese	PolyGram Records Ltd.	
1991	The Best of Priscilla Chan	永遠是你的陳慧嫻	Cantonese	PolyGram Records Ltd.	
1992	Come Back	歸來吧	Cantonese	PolyGram Records Ltd.	
1993	Always By Your Side	你身邊永是我	Cantonese	PolyGram Records Ltd.	
1994	Who Is My Love Today	今天的愛人是誰	Cantonese	PolyGram Records Ltd.	
1995	Welcome Back	—N/a	Cantonese	PolyGram Records Ltd.	
1995	I Am Not Lonely	我不寂寞	Cantonese	PolyGram Records Ltd.	
1996	Contented	心滿意足	Cantonese	PolyGram Records Ltd.	
1996	Priscilla Chan in Concert '96	雪映美白'96陳慧嫻演唱會	Cantonese	PolyGram Records Ltd.	
1996	Problematic Woman	問題女人	Cantonese	PolyGram Records Ltd.	
1997	Musical Encounters with Priscilla and the Philharmonic	慧嫻‧港樂奇妙旅程演唱會	Cantonese/Mandarin	PolyGram Records Ltd.	
1997	The Heart Is About To Fly Away	心就要飛了	Mandarin	PolyGram Records Ltd.	
1998	In Love For 2000 Hours	愛戀二千小時	Cantonese	PolyGram Records Ltd./Cinepoly Records Co Ltd.	
1998	Priscilla Chan and William So Music is Live	陳慧嫻 + 蘇永康拉闊音樂	Cantonese	PolyGram Records Ltd./Cinepoly Records Co. Ltd.	
1999	This Is Love	正視愛	Cantonese	Universal Music Group/Cinepoly Records Co. Ltd.	
2000	Good For You	為你好	Cantonese	Universal Music Group/Cinepoly Records Co Ltd.	
2003	Love Knot	情意結	Cantonese	Universal Music Group	
2003	Priscilla Chan Live	陳慧嫻珍演唱會 2003	Cantonese/English	Universal Music Group	
2008	Priscilla Chan Concert Live 2008	陳慧嫻活出生命II演唱會 2008	Cantonese	Universal Music Group	
2014	By Heart	—N/a	Cantonese	PolyGram Records Ltd./Universal Music Group	
2014	Back To Priscilla: 30th Anniversary Concert 2014 Live	Back to Priscilla 陳慧嫻30周年演唱會 2014	Cantonese	PolyGram Records Ltd./Universal Music Group	
2015	Evolve	—N/a	Cantonese	PolyGram Records Ltd./Universal Music Group	
2016	Priscilla-ism Live 2016	陳慧嫻 Priscilla-ism 演唱會 2016	Cantonese	PolyGram Records Ltd./Universal Music Group	
2022	Isshōkenmei	一生懸命	Cantonese	Universal Music Group	
2025	The Fabulous 40 Priscilla LIVE IN HONG KONG	The Fabulous 40 Priscilla LIVE IN HONG KONG 陳慧嫻演唱會	Cantonese/English	Emperor Entertainment Group	

== Filmography ==
Year	Title	Native name	Role	Notes/Ref.
1986	Devoted to You	痴心的我	Priscilla	Cameo role
1988	Nausicaä of the Valley of the Wind	風之谷	Nausicaä (voice)	Cantonese dub
