= Priscilla Chan (disambiguation) =

Priscilla Chan (born 1985) is an American pediatrician and philanthropist.

Priscilla Chan may also refer to:

- Priscilla Chan (singer) (born 1965), Hong Kong singer

== See also ==
- Priscelia Chan (born 1978), Singaporean television actress and host
