= 1995 RTHK Top 10 Gold Songs Awards =

Hong Kong music awards ceremony

The 1995 RTHK Top 10 Gold Songs Awards (Chinese: 第十八屆十大中文金曲頒獎音樂會) was held in 1996 for the 1995 music season.

== Top 10 song awards ==
The top 10 songs (十大中文金曲) of 1995 are as follows.

Song name in Chinese	Artist	Composer	Lyricist
離開以後	Jacky Cheung	Lee Shih Shiong	Keith Chan (陳少琪)
一生最愛就是你	Leon Lai	Mahmood Rumjahn (林慕德)	Jolland Chan Kim Wo (向雪懷)
捨不得你	Sammi Cheng	Mahmood Rumjahn (林慕德)	Lo Sheung Yan (勞雙恩)
(你沒有) 好結果	Amanda Lee	Keith Yip Mak Gou-loen (麥皓輪)	Wyman Wong
真永遠	Andy Lau	Chan Yiu-cyun (陳耀川)	Li On-sau (李安修)
濃情化不開	Wakin Chau	Wakin Chau	Albert Leung
我寂寞	Priscilla Chan	Lau Wing-gin (劉永堅)	Cheung Mei-jin (張美賢)
純真傳說	Aaron Kwok	Mark Lui	Siu mei (小美)
如夢初醒	Cass Phang	Terrence Choi (蔡國權)	Jolland Chan Kim Wo (向雪懷)
這個冬天不太冷	Jacky Cheung	Jacky Cheung	Keith Chan (陳少琪)

== Other awards ==
Award	Song or album (if available)	Recipient
Top 10 outstanding artists award (十大優秀流行歌手大獎)	–	Wakin Chau, Sammi Cheng, Jacky Cheung, Cass Phang, Ekin Cheng, Aaron Kwok, Leon Lai, Priscilla Chan, Hacken Lee, Faye Wong
Best new prospect award (最有前途新人獎)	–	(gold) Kelly Chen (silver) Christine Ng (bronze) Ray Chan (陳建穎)
Best dance performance award (最佳舞台表現新人)	–	Kelly Chen
Best singing technique award (最佳歌唱技巧新人)	–	Kit Chan
Best artistic talent award (最有音樂才華新人)	–	Zen
Best C-pop lyrics award (最佳中文流行歌詞獎)	(你沒有)好結果	Wyman Wong
Best original creation song award (最佳原創歌曲獎)	春光乍洩	Anthony Wong
Best original creation song award (最佳原創歌曲獎)	濃情化不開	Wakin Chau
Best revision song award (最佳改編歌曲獎)	送你一瓣的雪花	Leon Lai
Best revision song award (最佳改編歌曲獎)	直至消失天與地	Ekin Cheng
Outstanding Mandarin song award (優秀國語歌曲獎)	(gold) 味道 (silver) 真永遠 (bronze) 不要對他說	Winnie Hsin Andy Lau Jeff Chang
Sales award (全年最高銷量冠軍歌手大獎)	–	Jacky Cheung
International Chinese award (全球華人至尊金曲)	真永遠	Andy Lau
95 Charity record award (九五年度慈善大碟獎)	–	Natalis Chan
RTHK Golden needle award (金針獎)	–	Teresa Teng
