= Eat You Up =

"Eat You Up" may refer to:

- "Eat You Up" (Angie Gold song), a 1985 song by British singer Angie Gold
  - "Dancing Hero (Eat You Up)", a Japanese cover of the above song released in the same year by Yōko Oginome
- "Eat You Up" (BoA song), a 2008 song by South Korean singer BoA
