= 1996 Jade Solid Gold Best Ten Music Awards Presentation =

Hong Kong music awards ceremony

The 1996 Jade Solid Gold Best Ten Music Awards Presentation (Chinese: 1996年度十大勁歌金曲頒獎典禮) was held in January 1997. It is part of the Jade Solid Gold Best Ten Music Awards Presentation series held in Hong Kong.

== Top 10 song awards ==
The top 10 songs (十大勁歌金曲) of 1996 are as follows.

Song name in Chinese	Artist
聽風的歌	Aaron Kwok
夜風鈴	Cass Phang
默契	Sammi Cheng
呼吸	Edmond Leung
妳的名字, 我的姓氏	Jacky Cheung
奇妙旅程	Priscilla Chan
情深說話未曾講	Leon Lai
風花雪	Kelly Chen
一個人睡	Andy Lau
發現	Ekin Cheng

== Additional awards ==
Award	Song (if available for award)	Recipient
Brilliant achievement award (輝煌成就大獎 )	-	Roman Tam
Most popular Mandarin song (最受歡迎國語歌曲獎)	情書	(gold) Jacky Cheung
-	思念誰	(silver) Eric Moo
-	因為愛	(bronze) Andy Lau
Outstanding performance award (傑出表現獎)	-	(gold) Daniel Chan
-	-	(silver) Leo Ku
-	-	(bronze) Karen Tong (湯寶如)
The best compositions (最佳作曲獎)	情深說話未曾講	Mark Lui, performed by Leon Lai
The best lyrics (最佳填詞獎)	妳的名字, 我的姓氏	Albert Leung, performed by Jacky Cheung
The best music arrangement (最佳編曲獎)	第二最愛	Black Box, performed by Leo Ku
The best song producer (最佳歌曲監製獎)	情深說話未曾講	Mark Lui, performed by Leon Lai
Four channel award (四台聯頒傳媒大獎 - 大碟獎)	Perhaps	Leon Lai
The most popular new male artist (最受歡迎新人獎)	-	(gold) Gigi Leung
-	-	(silver) Ronald Cheng
-	-	(bronze) Josie Ho
The best music video (最佳音樂錄影帶獎)	未忘人	Kwok ga-ping (郭嘉萍), performed by Amanda Lee (李蕙敏)
The most popular male artist (最受歡迎男歌星獎)	-	Jacky Cheung
The most popular female artist (最受歡迎女歌星獎)	-	Sammi Cheng
Asian Pacific most popular Hong Kong male artist (亞太區最受歡迎香港男歌星獎)	-	Andy Lau
Asian Pacific most popular Hong Kong female artist (亞太區最受歡迎香港女歌星獎)	-	Faye Wong
Gold song gold award (金曲金獎)	情深說話未曾講	Leon Lai
Best dance (至尊舞台大獎)	-	Aaron Kwok
Community chest charity award (公益金慈善金曲大獎)	當年情 (previous by Leslie Cheung)	Leon Lai
