= Love Message =

Love Message may refer to:

- "Love Message" (song), a 1996 song
- Love Message (film), a 2005 Chinese film
