= Final Fantasy (disambiguation) =

Final Fantasy is a media franchise originating from a role-playing video game of the same name, which debuted on the Nintendo Entertainment System in 1987.

Final Fantasy may also refer to:

- Final Fantasy (video game), the first video game in the series
- Final Fantasy: Legend of the Crystals, a 1994 anime OVA released in Japan as Final Fantasy

In music:

- Final Fantasy is the former name of Owen Pallett's Toronto-based musical project
- Final Fantasy (album), a 2005 album by Leo Ku, or the title track
- "Final Fantasy", a song by Alma from Have U Seen Her?
- "Final Fantasy", a song by Drake from Scorpion

== See also ==
- List of Final Fantasy media
