= 1999 Jade Solid Gold Best Ten Music Awards Presentation =

Hong Kong music awards ceremony

The 1999 Jade Solid Gold Best Ten Music Awards Presentation (Chinese: 1999年度十大勁歌金曲頒獎典禮) was held in January 2000. It is part of the Jade Solid Gold Best Ten Music Awards Presentation series held in Hong Kong.

== Top 10 song awards ==
The top 10 songs (十大勁歌金曲) of 1999 are as follows.

Song name in Chinese	Artist
新的喝采	Aaron Kwok
真心真意	Andy Hui
幸福摩天輪	Eason Chan
插曲	Sammi Cheng
非走不可	Nicholas Tse
對你太在乎	Kelly Chen
抬起我的頭來	Miriam Yeung
償還	Faye Wong
心只有你	Andy Lau
羅馬假期	Leo Ku

== Additional awards ==
Award	Song (if available for award)	Recipient
The most popular male artist (最受歡迎男歌星獎)	–	Andy Lau
The most popular female artist (最受歡迎女歌星獎)	–	Kelly Chen
Asian Pacific most popular Hong Kong male artist (亞太區最受歡迎香港男歌星獎)	–	Aaron Kwok
Asian Pacific most popular Hong Kong female artist (亞太區最受歡迎香港女歌星獎)	–	Faye Wong
Gold song gold award (金曲金獎)	插曲	Sammi Cheng
The best group songs (最受歡迎合唱歌曲獎)	來夜方長	(gold) William So, Kit Chan
–	讓我取暖	(silver) Leehom Wang, Cass Phang
–	不再悲哀的日期	(bronze) Steven Ma, Frances Yip
Most popular Mandarin song (最受歡迎國語歌曲獎)	愛你一萬年	(gold) Andy Lau
–	心如刀割	(silver) Jacky Cheung
–	許願	(bronze) Leo Ku, Gigi Leung
Annual outstanding award (99年度傑出表現獎)	–	(gold) Nicolas Tse
–	–	(silver) Miriam Yeung
–	–	(bronze) Gigi Leung
The best compositions (最佳作曲獎)	櫻花	Hacken Lee, Gong gong-san (江港生), performed by Hacken Lee
The best lyrics (最佳填詞獎)	一枝花	Albert Leung, performed by Cass Phang
The best music arrangement (最佳編曲獎)	來夜方長	Dennie Wong (黃丹儀), performed by William So, Kit Chan
The best song producer (最佳歌曲監製獎)	非走不可	Ronald Ng (伍樂城), performed by Nicholas Tse
Four channel award (四台聯頒傳媒大獎)	–	Leon Now, performed by Leon Lai; Believe, performed by Nicholas Tse
The most popular new artist (最受歡迎新人獎)	–	(=gold) Joey Yung
–	–	(=gold) Cecilia Cheung
–	–	(bronze) Ruby Lin
The most popular commercial song (最受歡迎廣告歌曲獎)	渴望無限 Ask For More	(gold) Aaron Kwok
–	心只有你	(silver) Andy Lau
–	任何天氣	(bronze) Cecilia Cheung
Most popular adapted song award (最受歡迎改編歌曲演繹大獎)	未知	Joey Yung
Community chest charity award (公益金慈善金曲大獎)	一起走過的日子	Andy Lau
Honours award (榮譽大獎)	–	Leslie Cheung
