= 1998 Jade Solid Gold Best Ten Music Awards Presentation =

Hong Kong music awards ceremony

The 1998 Jade Solid Gold Best Ten Music Awards Presentation (Chinese: 1998年度十大勁歌金曲頒獎典禮) was held in January 1999. It is part of the Jade Solid Gold Best Ten Music Awards Presentation series held in Hong Kong.

== Top 10 song awards ==
The top 10 songs (十大勁歌金曲) of 1998 are as follows.

| Song name in Chinese | Artist |
|---|---|
| 你是我的女人 | Andy Lau |
| 越吻越傷心 | William So |
| 天下無雙 | Eason Chan |
| 情誡 | Faye Wong |
| 不想這是場戲 | Jacky Cheung |
| 愛你 | Andy Hui |
| 一變傾城 | Aaron Kwok |
| 祝你快樂 | Sammi Cheng |
| 我這樣愛你 | Leon Lai |
| 有你一天 | Leo Ku |

== Additional awards ==
| Award | Song (if available for award) | Recipient |
|---|---|---|
| The best group songs (最受歡迎合唱歌曲獎) | 甲乙丙丁 | (gold) Andy Hui, Ronald Cheng, Jacky Cheung |
| – | 一往情深 | (silver) Ekin Cheng, Gigi Leung |
| – | 對你, 我永不放棄 | (bronze) Gallen Lo, Flora Chan |
| Most popular Mandarin song (最受歡迎國語歌曲獎) | 笨小孩 | (gold) Andy Lau, Blackie Ko, Jacky Wu |
| – | 牽手 | (silver) A-mei Cheung |
| – | 最近比較煩 | (bronze) Wakin Chau, Jonathan Lee, Victor Wong |
| Outstanding performance award (傑出表現獎) | – | (gold) Gallen Lo |
| – | – | (silver) Miriam Yeung |
| – | – | (bronze) Nicholas Tse |
| The best compositions (最佳作曲獎) | 愛你 | Mark Lui, performed by Andy Hui |
| The best lyrics (最佳填詞獎) | 當男人愛上女人 | Keith Chan (陳少琪), performed by Amanda Lee (李蕙敏) |
| The best music arrangement (最佳編曲獎) | 球迷奇遇記 | Gong gong-sang (江港生), performed by Hacken Lee |
| The best song producer (最佳歌曲監製獎) | 越吻越傷心 | Conrad Wong (黃尚偉), performed by William So |
| Four channel award (四台聯頒傳媒大獎 – 大碟獎) | 情誡 | Adrian Chan, Albert Leung, performed by Faye Wong |
| The best music series (最佳音樂特輯) | 羅文弦曲情牽俄羅斯 | Roman Tam |
| The most popular new artist (最受歡迎新人獎) | – | (gold) Grace Ip (葉佩雯) |
| – | – | (silver) Lillian Ho (何嘉莉) |
| – | – | (bronze) Pace Wu (吳佩慈) |
| The most popular commercial song (最受歡迎廣告歌曲獎) | 愛你不愛你 | (gold) Leon Lai |
| – | You're the one | (silver) Kelly Chen |
| – | 大激想 | (bronze) Eason Chan, Miriam Yeung, Edmond Leung |
| The most popular male artist (最受歡迎男歌星獎) | – | Aaron Kwok |
| The most popular female artist (最受歡迎女歌星獎) | – | Faye Wong |
| Asian Pacific most popular Hong Kong male artist (亞太區最受歡迎香港男歌星獎) | – | Jacky Cheung |
| Asian Pacific most popular Hong Kong female artist (亞太區最受歡迎香港女歌星獎) | – | A-mei Cheung |
| Gold song gold award (金曲金獎) | 我這樣愛你 | Leon Lai |
| Community chest charity award (公益金慈善金曲大獎) | Try to remember | Leon Lai |
