= 1989 RTHK Top 10 Gold Songs Awards =

Hong Kong music awards ceremony

The 1989 RTHK Top 10 Gold Songs Awards (Chinese: 1989年度十大中文金曲得獎) was held in 1989 for the 1988 music season.

== Top 10 song awards ==
The top 10 songs (十大中文金曲) of 1989 are as follows.

Song name in Chinese	Artist	Composer	Lyricist
一生不變	Hacken Lee	Pong Sing-cung (彭承松) Fan Zeon-dou (范俊道)	Heung Suet-wai (向雪懷)
千千闋歌	Priscilla Chan	Kohji Makaino	Richard Lam
依然	Sandy Lam	A.Armata B.Cantorilli	Richard Lam
真的愛你	Beyond	Wong Ka Kui	Siu mei (小美)
淑女	Anita Mui	Chris Babida (鮑比達)	Pun wai-yun (潘偉源)
Linda	Jacky Cheung	Katayama Keishi (片山圭司)	Richard Lam
夜機	Priscilla Chan	R.Siegel Robert Jung	Keith Chan (陳少琪)
誰明浪子心	Dave Wong	Dave Wong	Pun Jyun-loeng (潘源良)
一生何求	Danny Chan	Wong Man-cing (王文清)	Pun wai-yun (潘偉源)
夕陽之歌（金曲金奖）	Anita Mui	Kohji Makaino	Keith Chan (陳少琪)

== Other awards ==
Award	Song or album (if available)	Recipient
Best new prospect award (最有前途新人獎)	–	(gold) Dave Wong (silver) Shirley Kwan (bronze) William So (Exceptional award) Echo, Wong Jik (黃翊), Patrick Tam
Best record producer award (最佳唱片監製獎)	永遠是你的朋友	Michael Au (區丁玉), Chan wing-ming (陳永明) for Priscilla Chan
Best musical arrangements (最佳編曲獎)	燒	Anthony Lun
Best record design award (最佳唱片封套設計獎)	看星的日子	Temsa Bee
Best C-pop song award (最佳中文流行歌曲獎)	難得有情人	Lou Dung-nei (盧東尼)
Best C-pop lyrics award (最佳中文流行歌詞獎)	憑著愛	Pun Jyun-loeng (潘源良)
Outstanding mandarin song award (優秀國語歌曲獎)	血染的風采	Wong Hung (王虹)
Outstanding mandarin song award (優秀國語歌曲獎)	一無所有	Cui Jian
Sales award (全年銷量冠軍大獎)	永遠是你的朋友	Priscilla Chan
IFBI award (IFPI大獎)	–	Anita Mui, Priscilla Chan
RTHK Golden needle award (金針獎)	–	Paula Tsui
