= Jade Solid Gold (album) =

Compilation album by Leo Ku
- Released: February 7, 2005
- Genre: Cantopop

Leo Ku chronology
Nobita	Jade Solid Gold	Star Track

Jade Solid Gold (勁歌金曲) is an album by Cantopop singer Leo Ku, released on February 7, 2005. It include some of the previous popular hit songs like Nobita (大雄), Love and Honesty (愛與誠), Second Most Loved (第二最愛), Killing Move (必殺技) and Let Heaven Shed Its Tears (任天堂流淚). The album also include a DVD with Karaoke of some of the hit songs.

The only new song in this album is Jade Solid Gold, which itself is a compilation of 39 love songs that had sung by various artist like Leon Lai, Joey Yung, Miriam Yeung, and more.

== Track listing ==
CD

1. Jade Solid Gold (勁歌金曲) - New Song (Medley)
  1. Chapter 1: Big Sky of Love (天大的愛)
    1. Songs: Love You (愛你), Love is Forever (愛是永恆), My Pride (我的驕傲), Love is the Biggest Privilege(愛是最大權利), Love is Bigger Than Sky (戀愛大過天)
  2. Chapter 2: Talk About Love (講情)
    1. Songs: Shall We Talk, Which Day I Didn't Think About You (哪有一天不想你), Kiss More Sad More (越吻越傷心), I Said I Want You To Be Happy (我說過要你快樂), If You Had Let Me Finish Talking(假如讓我說下去), Deep Words Haven't Been Spoken (情深說話未曾講)
  3. Chapter 3: 日月星辰風雨潮
    1. Songs: 太陽星辰, 愛如潮水, Blue Rain (藍雨), Wind Continue to Blow (風繼續吹), 讓一切隨風, Like Wind (如風), Promise (約定)
  4. Chapter 4: Two People (兩個人)
    1. Songs: Modern Love Story (現代愛情故事), Too Hard To Be In Love (相愛很難), 誰令你心癡, 相逢何必曾相識, Teach Me How To Not Love Her (教我如何不愛她), The Gentle You(溫柔的你)
  5. Chapter 5: Loner Songs (浪情歌)
    1. Songs: Who Would Understand The Heart of a Loner (誰明浪子心), Friendship Forever (友情歲月), 飛女正傳
  6. Chapter 6: God Love Commoners (神愛世人)
    1. Songs: Teenage Girl Prayer (少女的祈禱), God Please Save Me (神啊救救我), Love God(愛神)
  7. Last Chapter: Please Let Me Go (好心一早放開我)
    1. Songs: 小城大事, 獻世, Love and Honesty (愛與誠), 好心分手, Who Would Let Go (誰願放手)
2. Monica (新歌)
3. Love and Honesty (愛與誠)
4. 傷追人
5. Nobita (大雄)
6. Killing Move/Fatal Trick (必殺技)
7. Love God (愛神)
8. Wuhung (悟空)
9. Let Heaven Shed Its Tears (任天堂流淚)
10. Holiday In Rome (羅馬假期)
11. Enjoying Yourself Tonight (歡樂今宵)
12. Be My Valentine
13. Friendship (友共情)
14. Actually I...I...I (其實我...我...我)
15. Second Most Loved (第二最愛)
16. 笑說想

=== Bonus Tracks ===
1. Killing Move/Fatal Trick (必殺技) - The KKK X'mas Party Band
2. Nobita (大雄) - Drama version
3. Love and Honesty (愛與誠)- Featuring Vivian Chow

== DVD ==
1. Monica
2. Love and Honesty (愛與誠) - Karaoke
3. 傷追人 - Karaoke
4. Nobita (大雄) - Karaoke
5. Killing Move/Fatal Trick (必殺技) - Karaoke
6. Love God (愛神) - Karaoke
7. Wuhung (悟空) - Karaoke
8. Let Heaven Shed Its Tears (任天堂流淚) - Karaoke
