= 1986 Jade Solid Gold Best Ten Music Awards Presentation =

Hong Kong music awards ceremony

The 1986 Jade Solid Gold Best Ten Music Awards Presentation (Chinese: 1986年度十大勁歌金曲頒獎典禮) was held in January 1987. It is part of the Jade Solid Gold Best Ten Music Awards Presentation series held in Hong Kong.

== Top 10 song awards ==
The top 10 songs (十大勁歌金曲) of 1986 are as follows.

| Song name in Chinese | Artist(s) |
|---|---|
| 將冰山劈開 | Anita Mui |
| 遙遠的她 | Jacky Cheung |
| 當年情 | Leslie Cheung |
| 千個太陽 | Deanie Ip, Elisa Chan (陳潔靈) |
| 千億個夜晚 | George Lam |
| 幾許風雨 | Roman Tam |
| 無言感激 | Alan Tam |
| 朋友 | Alan Tam |
| 有誰共鳴 | Leslie Cheung |
| 夢伴 | Anita Mui |

== Additional awards ==
| Award | Song name (if available for award) | Recipient(s) |
|---|---|---|
| The Best Composition Award (最佳作曲獎) | 當年情 | Composer: Joseph Koo; Performed by: Leslie Cheung |
| The Best Lyric Award (最佳填詞獎) | 有誰共鳴 | Lyrics by: Siu Mei (小美); Performed by: Leslie Cheung |
| The Best Music Arrangement Award (最佳編曲獎) | 當年情 | Music Arrangement by: Joseph Koo; Performed by: Leslie Cheung |
| The Best Record Album Produced Award (最佳唱片監製獎) | 黑色午夜 | Music Producer by: Michael Lai; Performed by: Leslie Cheung |
| The Most Popular Disco Song Award (最受歡迎Disco歌曲) | 跳舞街 | Priscilla Chan |
| The Most Popular Group Award (最佳樂隊組合) | --- | Tai Chi (Band members: Albert Lui, Patrick Lui, Joey Tang, Ernest Lau, Edde Sing, Ricky Chu, Gary Tong) |
| The Most Popular Male Artist Award (最受歡迎男歌星獎) | --- | Alan Tam |
| The Most Popular Female Artist Award (最受歡迎女歌星獎) | --- | Anita Mui |
| Gold Song Gold Award (金曲金獎) | 有誰共鳴 | Leslie Cheung |
| Jade Solid Gold Honour Award (勁歌金曲榮譽大獎) | --- | Samuel Hui |
