= Eat You Up (Angie Gold song) =

Single by Angie Gold

from the album Applause
- B-side: "Eat You Up (Instrumental)"
- Released: 1985
- Recorded: 1985
- Genre: Hi-NRG
- Label: Passion Records
- Songwriters: Angelina Kyte; Anthony Baker
- Producer: Les Hunt

Angie Gold singles chronology
"Lucky in Love" (1982)	"Eat You Up" (1985)	"Timebomb" (1985)

Audio
- "Eat You Up" on YouTube

"Eat You Up" is a song by British singer-songwriter Angie Gold, released in 1985 by Passion Records. It was written by her and Anthony Baker, and produced by Les Hunt.

The song spent six weeks on US Billboard's Hot Dance/Disco Club Play chart in July–August 1985, but found more success in Japan, when covered in Japanese by Yōko Oginome towards the end of the year. The original by Angie Gold was also popular there – it was released in Japan under the title "Suteki na High Energy Boy" (素敵なハイエナジー・ボーイ, Suteki na Hai Enajī Bōi; "Nice High Energy Boy") and spent four consecutive weeks at No. 1 on Oricon's international singles chart in early 1986. The song was also adapted in several languages by other artists in Japan, Hong Kong, and South Korea.

Gold later re-recorded the song with producer Ian Levine for her 1995 compilation album The Best of Angie Gold: Eat You Up.

== Track listing ==
No.	Title	Writer(s)	Length
1.	"Eat You Up"	Angelina Kyte; Anthony Baker
2.	"Eat You Up (Instrumental)"	Kyte; Baker

== Charts ==
Chart (1985–1986)	Peak position
Japan (Oricon International)	1
US Dance Club Songs (Billboard)	30

== Cover versions ==
- Yōko Oginome covered the song in Japanese as her seventh single "Dancing Hero (Eat You Up)", from her 1985 compilation The Best. This version peaked at No. 5 on Oricon's singles chart and has since become her most popular song. She also recorded "Dancing Hero" with different English lyrics on her 1986 album Raspberry Wind.
- Yumi Yano covered the song in Japanese in her 1985 EP Makin' It. The lyrics are completely different from Oginome's version.
- Priscila Chan covered the song in Cantonese as "Tiu3 Mou5 Gaai1" (Chinese: 跳舞街; lit. "Dancing Street") in 1986, based mainly on Oginome's version. The song topped the Hong Kong charts and was awarded the 1986 Jade Solid Gold Best Ten Award for Most Popular Disco Song (Chinese: 最受歡迎Disco歌曲). "Tiu3 Mou5 Gaai1" is regarded as one of the pinnacles of Chan's career.
- Lee Eun-ha covered the song in Korean as "Salanghaeyo" (Korean: 사랑해요; lit. "I Love You") in 1986.
- In the 1990s, Sandeep Sapkota's Nepali version, "Dance Tonight", received constant replay on Nepal's national television. The song, modeled on Oginome's version in musical structure, was released on Sapkota's album Ayaam.
- Yang Hye Seung (born 1970) covered the song in Korean as "Hwalyeohan Single" (Korean: 화려한 싱글; lit. "Gorgeous Single") in 2003.
- Demon Kakka covered the song on his 2007 cover album Girls Rock Hakurai. His cover incorporates the lyrics of Oginome's version.
- Cita Citata, an Indonesian artist, covered the song in Bahasa Indonesia on her 2014 album single "Sakitnya Tuh Disini" which also became a television show using the same title.
