= Love Message (film) =

- Directed by: Ah Gan
- Written by: Ah Gan
- Starring: Leo Ku; Angela Chang
- Release date: 2005
- Running time: 87 mins
- Country: China
- Language: Mandarin

Love Message (Mandarin: Aiqin duanxun) is a 2005 film directed by Ah Gan.

== Cast ==
- Leo Ku
- Angela Chang
