= Zen (Chinese band) =

Hong Kong rock music band

Zen is a Hong Kong rock music band that was signed by Warner Bros. Records and had its debut album in 1995. They disbanded in 2000 and re-formed in 2005.

== Band members ==
- Vocal: 黃和興 (Addison)
- Bass Guitar: 鄭偉鴻 (Martin)
- Guitar: 鄧明輝 (James)
- Drums: 關禮琛（Pesky）

== Discography ==
- 1994: I Remember You（EP）
- 1995: 交織怒火 Warner Bros. Records
- 1995: 晴天
- 2000: Kawan

== Awards ==
- Commercial Radio Hong Kong best song
- Metro Broadcast Corporation）best new group
- Radio Television Hong Kong best new group
