= Final Fantasy (album) =

Album by Leo Ku

Final Fantasy (最終幻想)

Studio album by Leo Ku
- Released: November 2005
- Genre: Mandopop
- Label: EMI

Leo Ku chronology
Star Track	Final Fantasy (最終幻想)	Human

Final Fantasy (最終幻想, Zuìzhōng huànxiǎng) is a Mandarin album by the singer Leo Ku, released in November 2005. Most of the songs are from his famous cantopop hits in the previous two years including "Genius and Idiot", "Nobita" and "Love and Honesty".

== Track listing ==
1. Sleeping Beauty (睡美人)
2. Genius and Idiot (天才與白痴) - Mandarin version
3. Classmates (同班同學)
4. Nobita (大雄) - Mandarin version
5. Dynasty Warriors (三國無雙)
6. Final Fantasy (最終幻想)
7. Let Heaven Shed Tears (任天堂流淚) - Mandarin version
8. Love and Honesty (愛與誠) - Mandarin version
9. Summer Fairytale (夏天的童話)

=== Bonus track ===
1. Don't Say You Don't Know (不要說你不知道)
2. Spring (春天)
