= Angie Gold =

British singer

- Also known as: Angelina Kyte, Prima, Princess Paragon
- Born: Angelina Fiorina Kyte
- Origin: England
- Genres: Pop, R&B, disco
- Occupation: Singer
- Instrument: Vocals
- Years active: Late 1970s - 2000s
- Labels: Epic, Kaleidoscope Records Limited, Alfa International, Passion, Klone Records, Nightmare Records
- Formerly of: Girlfriends, Illusive, People Like Us, Stepsisters Suns of Shiva

Angie Gold (born Angelina Fiorina Kyte) is a British singer whose song "Eat You Up" was a dance hit in 1985.

== Background ==
Born into a musical and artistic Italian family, at the age of eight she was already performing in clubs on weekends. At 17 she did her first TV show.

At the age of 22, she was a contestant on a Saturday night TV show called Search for a Star, where she was spotted by the CBS / Epic Sony record label and signed a contract with them.

== Career ==
=== 1970s ===
In 1978, Angie Gold released a single in Germany on Polydor. The title song, "Der schönste Tag" (English translation: "The most beautiful day"), was a previously unreleased adaptation of "If I Had Words".

=== 1980s ===
She was pictured with Kaleidoscope Records Limited founder Robin Blanchflower after the completion of her debut single for the label, "Every Home Should Have One". She released the Gus Dudgeon-produced single titled on Kaleidoscope Records Limited. It appeared in the New Singles section of the 2 March 1981 issue of Record Business. The following week the single had debuted at No. 88 on the Record Business Airplay Guide chart. It was a "breaker / climber" Luxembourg, Trent and Beacon. It was a hit pick at Capital and on the main playlist or charting at Metro and BBC Scotland. The following week it had dropped down to No. 94. It was on the main playlist or charting at Metro and Swansea. It was also a hit pick and Plymouth. By 30 March it had moved up from No. 84 to No. 55. It was also on the main play list or charting at Metro, Swansea and Plymouth. By 6 April it had dropped down to No. 98. It was still on the main playlist or charting at Metro, Tees, Swansea and BBC Scotland.

After another single, she recorded her debut album, which was released in 1982.

Gold's second album, produced by Ben Findon, appeared later in the year. In 1982 with a song titled "Get It Over With" from that album she competed at the 11th Tokyo Music Festival (held at the Budokan), winning a "silver" award.

In May 1982, "Gold's single "Who Am I Kidding" bw "Now That the Party is Over" was released on Kaleidoscope KRL A2323. By 21 June the song was listed as a breaker and was a "breaker / climber" in Trent and Forth and on the man playlist at Swansea. It was still a breaker for the week of 28 June and 5 July. For the week of 12 July, the record debuted at No. 149 on the Record Business Bubbling Under Singles 101-150 chart. It peaked at No. 130 for the week of 26 July.

In 1985, she released a song titled "Eat You Up", which reached number 30 on the US Billboard disco chart. A Japanese-language cover of the song, titled "Dancing Hero", was released by Yōko Oginome as her seventh single. The original (published in Japan under the title "Suteki na High Energy Boy") was also popular there, spending four consecutive weeks at the very top of Oricon's International Singles Chart in early 1986.

Working with producer Nigel Wright, Gold recorded the Sela & Biddu composition "Applause". Backed with "Creature Of The Night", it was released on Passion PASH 62 in 1986. The single debuted at No. 14 on the Record Mirror Eurobeat chart for the week of 13 September 1986. It peaked at No. 2 for the week of 4 October. It was still in the chart at No. 24 for the week of 8 November.

In 1988, Gold became the new voice of the South-African Hi-NRG band People Like Us and recorded songs including "Resurrection" and "Two to Tango". She also recorded the ballad "Prayer for You", which was originally co-written by Cindy Dickenson.

=== 1990s - 2000s ===
In late 2007, she reunited with Ian Levine (with whom she worked in the 1980s and 1990s, starting with the 1986 single "Applause" on Passion Records) to record a new song titled "No Pain No Gain" for the various artists album Disco 2008.

As of 2007–2009, she lived in the Canary Islands.

== Discography ==
=== Albums ===
==== Studio albums ====
- Angie Gold (1982)
- A Lady of Gold (1982)
- Applause (1986)
- Angie Gold (1988)

==== Compilation albums ====
- The Best of Angie Gold (1995)

==== Albums with People Like Us ====
- People Like Us (1988)

=== Singles ===
Year	Title	Charts			Album
Year	Title	US Dance	AUS	JPN Oricon Int'l	Album
1978	"Der schönste Tag"	—	—	—	Non-album single
1981	"Every Home Should Have One"	—	—	—	Angie Gold
1981	"Love's Fool"	—	—		Angie Gold
1981	"A Woman's Intuition"	—	—		A Lady of Gold
1981	"Get It Over With"	—	62		A Lady of Gold
1982	"Who Am I Kidding"	—	—	—	A Lady of Gold
1982	"Lucky in Love"	—	—		Angie Gold
1985	"Eat You Up"	30	—	1	Applause
1985	"Timebomb"	—	—		Applause
1986	"Applause"	—	—		Applause
1987	"Third Finger Left Hand"	—	—		Non-album single
1988	"Haunted House"	—	—		Angie Gold (1988)
1989	"Right Back in the Middle"	—	—		Non-album single
1993	"Take My Breath Away"	—	—		Non-album single
1997	"I Finally Found Someone" (with Paul Parker)	—	—		Non-album single
