= William So =

Hong Kong actor and singer

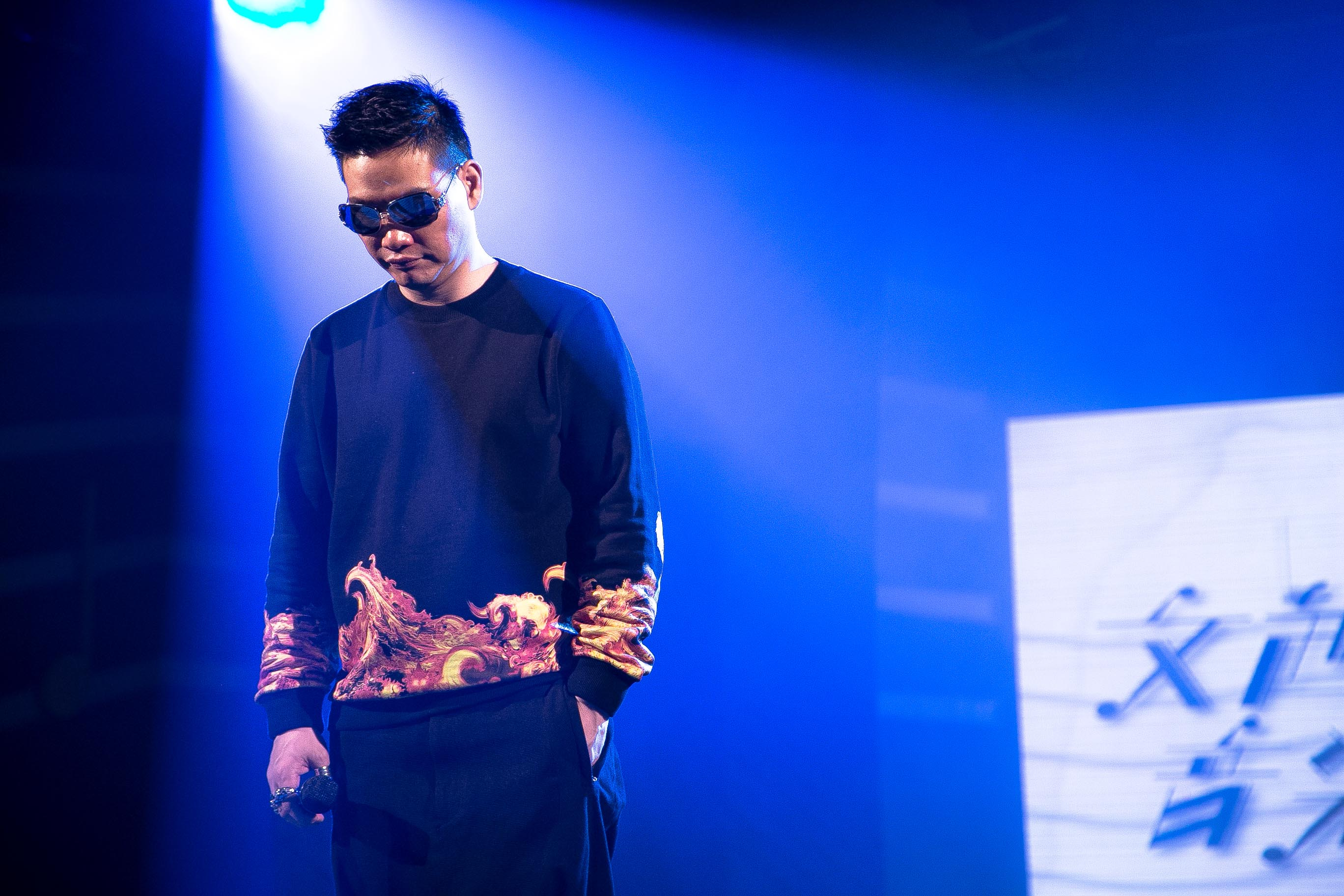
- So in 2014
- Born: So Wing Hong; 24 September 1967 (age 58); British Hong Kong
- Occupations: Singer; actor
- Years active: 1985–present
- Spouses: Jane Foong (m. 1999; div. 2003) Anita Fung (m. 2014)
- Children: 1
- Awards: New Talent Singing Awards – 1985 First Runner-up

Chinese name
Transcriptions
Standard Mandarin
- Hanyu Pinyin: su1 yong3 kang1
Yue: Cantonese
- Jyutping: sou1 wing5 hong1
- Musical career
- Origin: Hong Kong
- Genres: Mandopop, Cantopop
- Instrument: Singing
- Labels: 1985–1988, 2011 – present Capital Artist; 2004 – 2010 Gold Label; 1997 – 2004 Go East; 1993 – 1997 Cinepoly Records; 1988 – 1991 Time Records

William So Wing Hong (Chinese: 蘇永康; born 24 September 1967) is a Hong Kong actor and a Cantopop singer. He began his musical career by participating the New Talent Singing Awards in 1985 and won the competition as the first runner up to Alex To. His performance at that event earned him a record contract with Capital Artists, with which he released an EP. 1998 was the peak year for William So with his hit song Kiss More, Sad More, which is also the theme song for the popular TV Series Healing Hands.

== Filmography ==
| Year | Name | Role |
|---|---|---|
| 1994 | A Taste of Killing and Romance (殺手的童話) | |
| 1996 | Out of the Blur (廢話小說) | |
| 1997 | Tempting Heart (心動) | |
| 1997 | Fly Me to Polaris (星願) | |
| 2000 | Blue Moon (跑馬地的月光) | |
| 2001 | Police Station Number 7 (七號差館) | Cameo |
| 2001 | Love White Bread (愛情白麵包) | |
| 2001 | Perfect Match (月滿抱西環) | |
| 2002 | My Lucky Star (行運超人) | Cameo |
| 2003 | Truth or Dare: 6th Floor Rear Flat (六樓后座) | Mr. Hung (康sir) |
| 2004 | Magic Kitchen (魔幻廚房) | Cameo |
| 2008 | L for Love L for Lies (我的最愛) | Cameo |
| 2010 | 72 Tenants of Prosperity (72家租客) | |
| 2011 | Summer Love (戀夏戀夏戀戀下) | cameo |
| 2011 | East Meets West 2011 (東成西就 2011) | |
| 2012 | I Love Hong Kong 2012 (2012我愛HK 喜上加囍) | |
| 2012 | Diva (DIVA華麗之後) | |
| 2012 | Lan Kwai Fong 2 | |
| 2012 | Princess's Temptation | |
| 2014 | The True Love | |
| 2014 | Golden Chicken 3 | |

=== TV series ===
| Year | Name | Role |
|---|---|---|
| 1987 | Genghis Khan (成吉思汗) | |
| 1987 | Foundling's Progress (男兒本色) | |
| 1987 | Young Beat (鐳射青春) | |
| 1988 | A Friend in Need (飛躍霓裳) | |
| 1988 | Teenage No More (不再少年時) | |
| 1990 | Friends and Lovers (又是冤家又聚頭) | |
| 1992 | File of Justice (壹號皇庭) | Raymond Chow |
| 1993 | To Chord the Victory (少年五虎) | Ah Ken |
| 1993 | File Justice II (壹號皇庭 II) | Raymond Chow |
| 1994 | Glittering Moments (Catwalk 俏佳人) | |
| 1994 | File Justice III (壹號皇庭 III) | Raymond Chow |
| 1995 | File Justice IV (壹號皇庭 IV) | Raymond Chow |
| 1997 | File Justice V (壹號皇庭 V) | Raymond Chow |
| 1998 | Healing Hands (妙手仁心) | Gilbert Kong |
| 2002 | A Case of Misadventure (騎呢大狀) | |
| 2002 | The Monkey King: Quest for the Sutra (齊天大聖孫悟空) | East Dragon Emperor |
| 2003 | Hail The Judge (新九品芝麻官) | |
| 2003 | Kung Fu Soccer (功夫足球) | Guest |
| 2006 | Silence (深情密碼) | Guest (Doctor Su) |
| 2006 | Twisted Love (讓愛自由) | |
| 2006 | Hailed The Judge (棟篤狀王) | |
| 2007 | Stupid Kid (笨小孩) (ATV) | |
| 2008 | Central Women(中環女人) (ATV) | |
| 2008 | Dressage To Win (盛裝舞步愛作戰) (TVB) | Himself |
| 2010 | The Men of Justice (法網群英) (ATV) | |
| 2011 | ICAC Investigators 2011 (廉政行動2011) | |
| 2015 | Once Upon a Song | |

=== Web drama ===
| Year | Name | Role |
|---|---|---|
| 2002 | Feel 100% (百分百感覺) | |
| 2002 | Feel 100% Winter Love Song (百分百感覺冬日戀曲) | |

== Awards ==
| Year | Award | Category | Work | Result | Ref. |
|---|---|---|---|---|---|
| 1989 | 1989 RTHK Top 10 Gold Songs Awards | Best new prospect award 最有前途新人獎 | | Bronze Award | |
| 1989 | Ultimate Song Chart Awards 叱吒樂壇 | Best New Male Artist 叱吒樂壇生力軍男歌手 | | Silver Award | |
| 1994 | 1994 Jade Solid Gold Top 10 Awards | Best Duet Song | Never Liked Being Alone 從不喜歡孤單一個 (with Angela Pang) | Gold Award | |
| 1994 | Metro Showbiz Hit Award 新城勁爆頒獎禮 | Best Duet Song 新城勁爆合唱歌曲 | Never Liked Being Alone 從不喜歡孤單一個 (with Angela Pang) | Won | |
| 1998 | Ultimate Song Chart Awards 叱吒樂壇 | Best Song 至尊歌曲大獎 | More Kisses, More Sorrows 越吻越傷心 | Won | |
| 1998 | Ultimate Song Chart Awards 叱吒樂壇 | My Favorite Song 我最喜愛的歌曲大獎 | More Kisses, More Sorrows 越吻越傷心 | Won | |
| 1998 | 1998 Jade Solid Gold Top 10 Awards | Top 10 Songs | More Kisses, More Sorrows 越吻越傷心 | Won | |
| 1998 | 1998 RTHK Top 10 Gold Songs Awards | Top 10 Songs | More Kisses, More Sorrows 越吻越傷心 | Won | |
| 1998 | 1998 RTHK Top 10 Gold Songs Awards | Top 10 outstanding artists award 十大優秀流行歌手大獎 | More Kisses, More Sorrows 越吻越傷心 | Won | |
| 1998 | 1998 RTHK Top 10 Gold Songs Awards | Leap award for male singer 飛躍大獎 | More Kisses, More Sorrows 越吻越傷心 | Gold Award | |
| 1998 | 1998 RTHK Top 10 Gold Songs Awards | International Chinese award 全球華人至尊金曲 | More Kisses, More Sorrows 越吻越傷心 | Won | |
| 1998 | Metro Showbiz Hit Awards 新城勁爆頒獎禮 | Top 10 Songs | More Kisses, More Sorrows 越吻越傷心 | Won | |
| 1998 | Metro Showbiz Hit Awards 新城勁爆頒獎禮 | Leap Award for singer 新城勁爆歌手突破大獎 | | Gold Award | |
| 1999 | 1999 Jade Solid Gold Top 10 Awards | Best Group Song | 來夜方長 (with Kit Chan) | Gold Award | |
| 1999 | 1999 RTHK Top 10 Gold Songs Awards | Top 10 outstanding artists award 十大優秀流行歌手大獎 | | Won | |
| 2000 | 2000 Jade Solid Gold Top 10 Awards | Best Group Song | 將生活留給自己 (with Andy Hui, Mark Lui, Flora Chan, Rain Li) | Bronze Award | |
| 2001 | 2001 Jade Solid Gold Top 10 Awards | Best Group Song | 意猶未盡 (with Rain Li) | Gold Award | |
| 2001 | Metro Showbiz Hit Awards 新城勁爆頒獎禮 | Top 10 Songs | 意猶未盡 (with Rain Li) | Won | |
| 2001 | Star Awards 2001 红星大奖2001 | Best Theme Songs | 光芒 | Won | |
| 2002 | Metro Showbiz Hit Awards 新城勁爆頒獎禮 | Top 10 Songs | I Promise After 我發誓以後 | Won | |

| Preceded by | New Talent Singing Awards First Runner-up; 1985 | Succeeded by Andy Hui (許志安) |
