= Human (Leo Ku album) =

Human (我生)

Studio album by Leo Ku
- Released: August 2006
- Genre: Cantopop
- Label: EMI

Leo Ku chronology
Final Fantasy (2005)	Human (我生) (2006)	Moments (2007)

Human (我生) is a Cantonese album by the singer Leo Ku, released in August 2006. The song "Never Too Late" (愛得太遲) earned Ku eighteen awards between the year 2006 and 2007. The song was based on the true story of one of his friends, who worked too hard and neglected the people around him until it was too late. Ku worked with the lyricist Albert Leung (林夕), to remind everyone to not work so hard and miss out everything in life.

== Track listing ==
1. Human (我生)
2. 敢死隊
3. Love Beauty (愛美麗)
4. 不如留低我
5. Repeated Mistake (重複犯錯)
6. Lucky (黑仔)
7. Shower (花灑)
8. 愛恨交纏
9. Never Too Late/Belated Love (愛得太遲)
10. Firm Appointment (約定你)
11. 往生
