= Leo Ku discography =

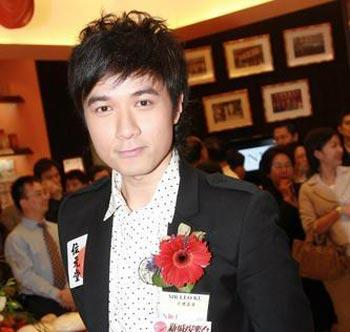
- Ku in 2009
- Studio albums: 26
- Extended plays: 5
- Live albums: 5
- Compilation albums: 6

This is the discography of Cantopop artist Leo Ku.

== Studio albums ==
List of studio albums
Title	Album details
Explanation of Love (愛的解釋)	Release Date: Hong Kong 28 July 1994 Singapore 29 November 2025 Singapore 30 November 2025; Language: Cantonese; Label:
Smile. Talk. Think. (笑說想)	Release Date: January 1995; Language: Cantonese; Label:
Actually I... I... I... (其實我...我...我...)	Release Date: November 1995; Language: Cantonese; Label:
Enjoy Yourself Tonight (歡樂今宵)	Release Date: 30 July 1997; Language: Cantonese; Label: BMG
The Clock That Forgets Time (忘了時間的鐘)	Release Date: December 1997; Language: Mandarin; Label: BMG
Flying Love and Dreams (愛與夢飛行)	Release Date: May 1998; Language: Cantonese; Label:
Stall (路邊攤)	Release Date: September 1998; Language: Mandarin; Label:
Be My Valentine	Release Date: December 1998; Language: Cantonese; Label: EMI
Leo Ku (古巨基)	Release Date: March 1999; Language: Mandarin; Label:
The Weather Changes (天氣會變)	Release Date: October 1999; Language: Cantonese; Label: EMI
Treasure Hunting (尋寶)	Release Date: January 2000; Language: Mandarin; Label:
New Pattern	Release Date: January 2001; Language: Cantonese; Label: Warner
Games (遊戲 - 基)	Release Date: November 2003; Language: Cantonese; Label: EMI
Nobita (大雄)	Release Date: July 31, 2004; Language: Cantonese; Label: EMI
Star Track (星戰)	Release Date: October 2005; Language: Cantonese; Label: EMI
Final Fantasy (最終幻想)	Release Date: November 2005; Language: Mandarin; Label: EMI
Human (我生)	Release Date: August 2006; Language: Cantonese; Label: EMI
Moments	Release Date: August 2007; Language: Cantonese; Label: Gold Label Records
Still the Master of Love Songs (我還是你的情歌王)	Release Date: June 2008; Language: Mandarin; Label: Gold Label Records
Guitar Fever	Release Date: September 2008; Language: Cantonese; Label: Gold Label Records
Strings Fever	Release Date: 2009; Language: Cantonese; Label: Gold Label Records
You Talkin' To Me?	Release Date: November 2009; Language: Cantonese; Label: Emperor Entertainment Group
The Age (時代)	Release Date: July 2010; Language: Cantonese; Label: Emperor Entertainment Group
The Era (大時代)	Release Date: April 2011; Language: Mandarin; Label: Emperor Entertainment Group
Amazing World (大時代) – EP	Release Date: October 2011; Language: Cantonese; Label: Emperor Entertainment Group
Dire Au Revoir A Mes Amours (告別我的戀人們)	Release Date: September 2012; Language: Cantonese; Label: Emperor Entertainment Group

== Compilation albums ==
List of compilation albums
Title	Album details
Second Most Loved (第二最愛)	Release Date: August 1996; Language: Cantonese; Label:
Having You On This Day (有你這一天)	Release Date: December 1998; Language: Cantonese; Label:
Greatest Hits	Release Date: January 2000; Language: Cantonese; Label:
Deeply deeply In Love (戀戀情深)	Release Date: May 2001; Language: Mandarin; Label:
Jade Solid Gold (勁歌金曲)	Release Date: February 7, 2005; Language: Cantonese; Label:
Leo Ku 2008 Jade Solid Gold 2 – New + Best Selection	Release Date: March 2008; Language: Cantonese; Label:

== Live albums ==
List of live albums
Title	Album details
Leo Ku – 903 Concert (叱咤萬人幫勝利誓師音樂會)	Release Date: October 2000; Language: Cantonese; Label:
Music is Live (拉闊音樂會)	Release Date: June 2004; Language: Cantonese; Label:
Leo Ku in Concert 2005 (05 勁歌金曲演唱會)	Release Date: May 2005; Language: Cantonese; Label:
Leo Ku The Magic Moments Concert 2007 (古巨基 The Magic Moments 演唱會 2007)	Release Date: 2007; Language: Cantonese; Label:
Leo Ku Eye Fever Concert 2009 (古巨基 Eye Fever 演唱會 2009)	Release Date: 2009; Language: Cantonese; Label:

== Extended plays ==
List of EPs
Title	Album details
Kiss Me, Okay? (親親我好嗎?)	Release Date: April 1995 (EP); Language: Cantonese; Label:
Wish (心願)	Release Date: January 1997 (EP); Language: Cantonese; Label:
Tiu Fei Gei (跳飛機)	Release Date: July 2000 (EP); Language: Cantonese; Label:
Guitar Fever	Release Date: September 2008 (EP); Language: Cantonese; Label:
Strings Fever	Release Date: April 2009 (EP); Language: Cantonese; Label:

== VCD/DVD ==
- August 2004: Music is Live (拉闊音樂會) (VCD/DVD)
- June 2005: Leo Ku in Concert 2005 (05 勁歌金曲演唱會) (VCD)
- July 2005: Leo Ku in Concert 2005 (05 勁歌金曲演唱會) (DVD)
- January 2007: Joey Yung x Leo Ku - California Red 903 Concert Live Karaoke (容祖兒 x 古巨基 - 加州紅903黃金組合音樂會) (VCD/DVD)
- February 2007: Leo Ku Karaoke (古巨基 - 黃金見聞錄卡拉OK) (VCD/DVD)
- 2007: Leo Ku The Magic Moments Concert 2007 (古巨基 The Magic Moments 演唱會 2007) (VCD/DVD)
- 2009: Leo Ku Eye Fever Concert 2009 (古巨基 Eye Fever 演唱會 2009) (DVD)
