= Jade Solid Gold =

- Opening title
- Genre: Music Show
- Presented by: See #Presenters
- Starring: C-pop artists
- Country of origin: Hong Kong
- Original language: Cantonese

Production
- Producer: TVB
- Production location: Hong Kong
- Running time: 70 minutes

Original release
- Network: TVB Jade
- Release: October 10, 1981 – May 21, 2023

Jade Solid Gold (Chinese: 勁歌金曲, literally "powerful song golden melody") is a music show on the TVB Jade television channel in Hong Kong. It has been running since October 10, 1981.

== History ==
Starting on October 10, 1981, every week, Jade Solid Gold features today's music videos, live performances or concerts, and a countdown of the top 20 best albums sold amongst the competition. The show has a live audience. Most of the performances are cantopop, rock, soul, and light music. Every January the Jade Solid Gold Best Ten Music Awards Presentation (十大勁歌金曲頒獎典禮) is one of the biggest music awards in Hong Kong. Along with the RTHK Top 10 Awards, they are the most recognized and publicized awards given.

The program also has a companion program called "Jade Solid Gold Song Video Corner (金曲挑戰站) ", in which a random music video is featured; hence the name.

== Participants ==
The majority of the singers to appear on the show are Cantopop or Hong Kong–based artists. Some mainland Chinese and Taiwanese artists have also performed on the show.

== Comparisons ==
A number of music themed shows have a similar format with Jade Solid Gold. This includes 360° (formerly 360° Boundless Music, 360° 音樂無邊) and Global Rhythm (無間音樂).

== Presenters ==
=== Current presenters ===
- Carrie Tam
- Ally Tse
- Auston Lam
- Daniel Chau
- Alvin Ng
- Jessica Law

=== Former presenters ===
- at17
- Cindy Au
- Nadia Chan
- Lawrence Cheng
- Nicola Cheung
- Bondy Chiu
- Amigo Choi
- Kent Choi
- Tracy Chu
- Paul Chung
- Vivian Chow
- Cerina Filomena da Graça
- G.E.M.
- Denise Ho
- Elaine Ho
- MC Jin
- Leo Ku
- Andrew Lam
- Jerry Lamb
- Hacken Lee
- Joey Leung
- Sammy Leung
- Mimi Lo
- Joe Nieh
- Patrick Tang
- Amigo Tsui
- Wyman Wong
- Woo Fung
- Paisley Wu
- Anna Yau
- Anita Yuen
- Louis Yuen
- Stephanie Ho
- Jinny Ng
- Fred Cheng
- Alfred Hui
- Hubert Wu
- Ronald Law
- Hoffman Tse

== See also ==
- Jade Solid Gold Best Ten Music Awards Presentation
- List of television programmes broadcast by TVB
