= Leo Ku =

Hong Kong singer (born 1972)

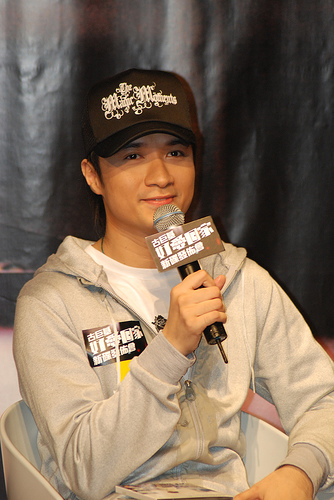
- Ku in 2007
- Born: 18 August 1972 (age 54); British Hong Kong
- Occupations: Singer; record producer; MV director; host; cartoonist; designer; model; actor
- Years active: 1991–present
- Spouse: Lorraine Chan (m. 2014)
- Children: 2 sons
- Awards: MTV Asia Awards – Favorite Artist, Hong Kong; 2008

Chinese name
- Chinese: 古巨基
Transcriptions
Standard Mandarin
- Hanyu Pinyin: Gǔ jùjī
Yue: Cantonese
- Yale Romanization: Gú Geuihgēi
- Jyutping: Gu2 Geoi6gei1
- Musical career
- Also known as: Ge Jai
- Origin: Hong Kong, China
- Genres: Cantopop, Mandopop
- Instrument: Guitar
- Labels: Music Plus (EEG) (2009–present); Gold Typhoon (EMI) (2003–2009); EEI (Warner Music) (1998–2001); Music Impact (Sony BMG) (1994–1998)
- Website: leoku.cc

Leo Ku Kui-kei (born 18 August 1972), founder of ChillGOOD TV, is a Hong Kong Cantopop and Mandopop singer, actor, TV host, model, cartoonist, MV director, and producer and designer. He employs falsetto as a singing technique and was named as one of the "Five Fresh Tigers of TVB".

== Career ==
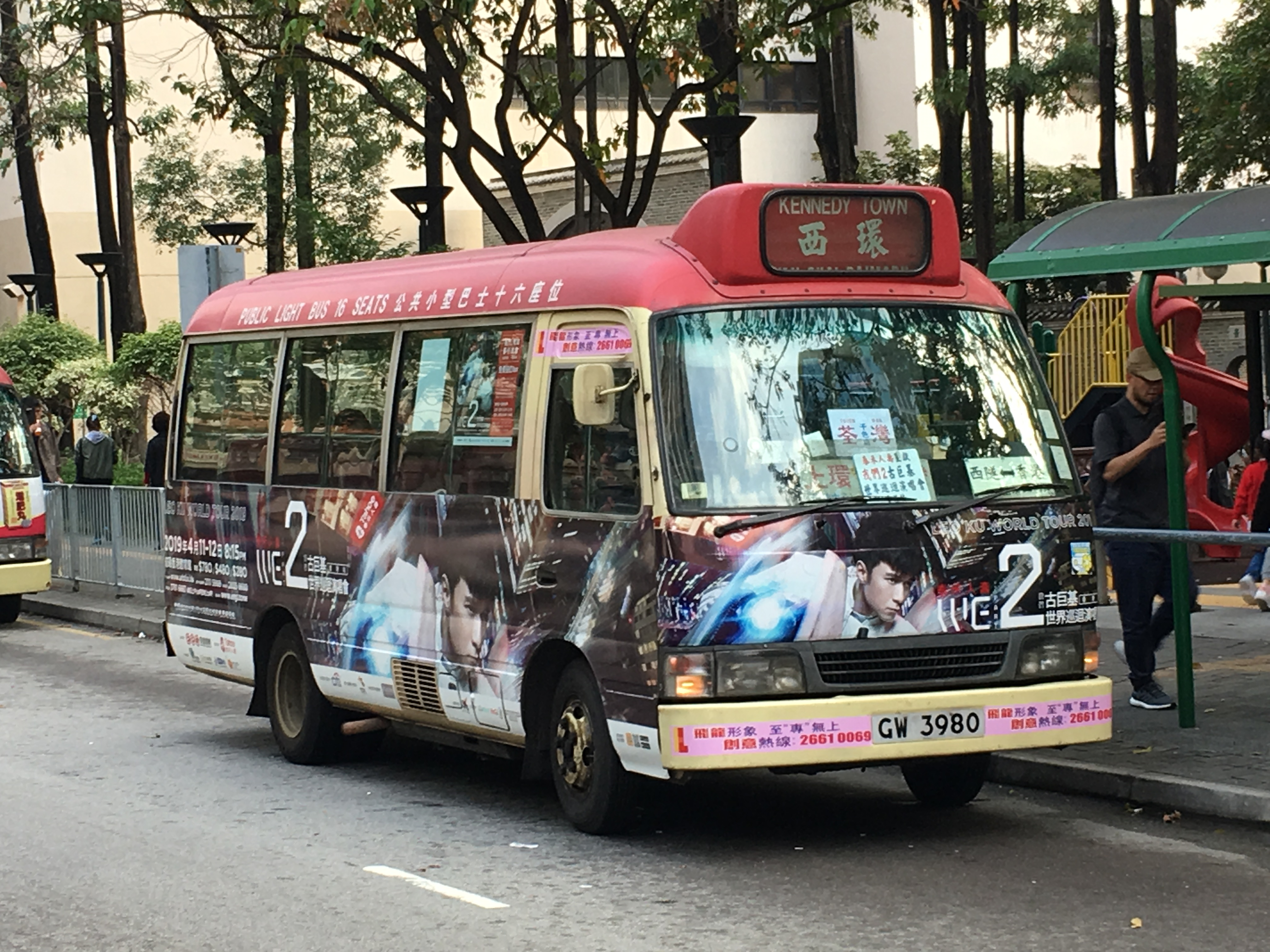
Ku paid passengers' fares to take the red minibus from Sai Wan to Tsuen Wan for free.

Joining TVB in 1991, Ku has released over 35 albums and he has won nearly 300 male singer and music awards over the course of his career.

In addition to Ku's career in Hong Kong, between 2000 and 2003, he played the male lead in two television drama series in mainland China, Romance in the Rain and My Fair Princess III: Heavenly Earth.

Ku's most famous Mandarin Chinese song is "Really Want" (好想好想), the theme song for the drama series Romance in the Rain. The song was broadcast across China. His best known Canto-pop song is "Never Too Late" which appeared on many year-end lists about the best songs of 2006 in Hong Kong. Ku was also selected to be the first host and a contestant in the third season of the Chinese version of I Am a Singer.

== Discography ==
- Games (2003)
- Nobita (2004)
- Star Track (2005)
- Final Fantasy (2005)
- Human (2006)
- Moments (2007)
- Guitar Fever (2008)

== Creations ==
- April 2003: Comic son Kubi (古比) was born
- August 2003: The Story of Kubi Comics Vol.1 (單行本), The Story of Kubi Comics Vol.1 Limited Version(完全限定版)
- August 2004: The Story of Kubi Comics Vol.2 (單行本), A Series of Kubi Stuff
- July 2008: Kubi Children Series 1 – Kubi's Cup (Kubi好孩子系列(1)-勝利的水杯), A Series of Kubi Stuff
- November 2008: Kubi illuminations on the wall of buildings for Christmas and New Year (商廈外牆設計之Kubi燈飾-聖誕及新年)
- November 2008: Own Label for clothes HOTDOG (個人服裝品牌"HOTDOG")

== Filmography ==
=== Film ===
- October 1993: Love on Delivery (破壞之王)
- 1995: Fatal Assignment
- June 1995: Romantic Dream (追女仔95—綺夢)
- July 1997: Cause We Are So Young (求戀期)
- November 1997: Task Force (熱血最強)
- March 1998: Anna Magdalena (安娜馬德蓮娜)
- December 1999: When I Look Upon the Stars (天旋地戀)
- September 2002: So Close (夕陽天使)(cameo)
- July 2005: Love Message (愛情短訊)
- February 2006: My Kung-Fu Sweetheart (野蠻秘笈)
- August 2006: Love at First Note (戀愛初歌)
- April 2007: Super Fans (甜心粉絲王)
- November 2008: Fit Lover (愛情左右)
- August 2012: Lan Kwai Fong 2 (喜愛夜蒲2)
- April 2015: Two Thumbs Up (衝鋒車)
- December 2015: Skiptrace (絕地逃亡)

=== Cantonese voice-overs ===
- June 1997: Hercules (大力士)
- June 2000: Stuart Little (一家之鼠超力仔)
- November 2002: Stuart Little 2 (一家之鼠超力仔2)
- July 2005: Robots (露寶治的世界)
- February 2010: The Princess and the Frog (公主與青蛙)

=== Television series ===
- November 1994: Instinct (笑看風雲)
- January 1995: The Trail of Love (前世冤家)
- August 1995: Stepping Stone (總有出頭天)
- April 1997: Weapons of Power (英雄貴姓)
- January 1996: Justice Bao (包青天之雪魄梅魂)
- January 1997: Corner the Con Man (皇家反千組)
- May 2001: Romance in the Rain (情深深雨濛濛)as He Shuhuan
- 2002: My Fair Princess III (還珠格格III – 天上人間) as Yongqi
- 2004: Sunshine Heartbeat (赤沙印記@四葉草2) as photographer
- 2006: Twist Love (讓愛自由 / 不該讓女人流淚)
- 2010: Youth Melody
- 2011: Happy Marshal
- 2014: Cao Cao (曹操) as Kong Rong

=== Television presenter ===
- 1991: Entertainment News Program (娛樂新聞眼)
- 1992: Jade Solid Gold (勁歌金曲-嘉賓主持)/Entertainment News Program (娛樂新聞眼)
- 1993: Entertainment News Program (娛樂新聞眼)
- July 1996: The Games of the Olympic Atlanta 1996 (1996年亞特蘭大奧林匹克運動會)
- 1999: Jade Solid Gold (勁歌金曲-嘉賓主持)
- November 2004: TVB Programme Preview 2005 (2005年無線節目巡禮)
- 2005: Jade Solid Gold (勁歌金曲-嘉賓主持)
- August 2008: The Games of the Olympic Beijing 2008 (2008年北京奧林匹克運動會)
- October 2008: Are You Smarter Than a 5th Grader? – TVB Cantonese Version (係咪小兒科)
- 2009: Judge on the singing competition show The Voice (zh:超級巨聲)

=== Radio presenter ===
- 1993: Eccentric Radio (古怪收音機)

== Awards ==
Ku has won song and artist awards from Commercial Radio Hong Kong, Jade Solid Gold, Metro Showbiz, RTHK, and others.

== Notes ==
- Leo Ku's Birthday Party. Retrieved 22 August 2005.
- Orison. Retrieved 24 December 2005.
