= Anita Mui =

Hong Kong singer and actress (1963–2003)

- 梅艷芳
- Mui in 1991
- Born: 10 October 1963; Mong Kok, British Hong Kong
- Died: 30 December 2003 (aged 40); Hong Kong Sanatorium & Hospital, Happy Valley, Hong Kong
- Burial place: Po Lin Monastery, Lantau Island, Hong Kong
- Occupations: Singer; actress
- Years active: 1982–2003
- Family: Ann Mui (sister)
- Awards: Full list
- Musical career
- Also known as: Madonna of the East; Daughter of Hong Kong
- Origin: British Hong Kong
- Genres: Cantopop; Mandopop
- Instrument: Vocals
- Labels: Capital Artists (1982–2000); Music Nation Group (2001–2003)

Chinese name
- Traditional Chinese: 梅艷芳
- Simplified Chinese: 梅艳芳
Transcriptions
Standard Mandarin
- Hanyu Pinyin: Méi Yànfāng
Yue: Cantonese
- Yale Romanization: Mùih Yihm-fōng
- Jyutping: Mui4 Jim6-fong1

Anita Mui Yim-fong (Chinese: 梅艷芳; 10 October 1963 – 30 December 2003) was a Hong Konger singer and actress who made major contributions to the Cantopop music scene and received numerous awards and honours. She remained an idol throughout her career, and is regarded as "Queen of Cantopop". She was dubbed as the "Daughter of Hong Kong" and is considered one of the most iconic Cantopop singers.

Mui once held a sold-out concert in Hammersmith, London, England, where she was dubbed the "Madonna of Asia", which brought her to further international fame. That title stayed with her throughout her career, in both Eastern and Western media. In June 2026, Mui was included in Oxford Dictionary of National Biography.

In the 1980s, the gangtai style of music was revolutionised by Mui's wild dancing and on-stage femininity. She was famed for her outrageous costumes and high-powered performances in tandem with contralto vocals, which are rare in female artists. Her 1985 album, 壞女孩 (Bad Girl), sold over 400,000 copies in Hong Kong and remains the highest-selling album of all time in the territory.

Her fan base reached far beyond Hong Kong into many parts of Asia, including Taiwan, China, Singapore, Korea, Japan and Malaysia. In the Hong Kong entertainment industry, where stars often rise and fall quickly, Mui consistently remained in the spotlight for 21 years (1982–2003). Her career came to an abrupt end in 2003 when she announced she had cervical cancer. She died later that year at the age of 40; her sister, Ann Mui, died three years earlier, at the same age from the same disease.

== Early life ==
Mui was born at Fa Yuen Street in Mong Kok, Kowloon, in October 1963. She is the youngest daughter in a family of four children, and the only one of the four born in Hong Kong, as her siblings were born in China. Mui's father died when she was very young. Her mother Mui Tam Mei-kam (1924-2026) was born in Xiguan, Guangzhou. She was a Chinese medicine practitioner, who opened Yuet Wah Chinese Medical Clinic, Wah Geong Chinese and Western Music College, and a music brand in Hong Kong. Her siblings are Mui Kai-Ming, Mui Tak-Ming, and singer Ann Mui. In some of her interviews, Mui mentioned that she had little memory of her father and that her family was impoverished. This meant that she had to help provide for her siblings at an early age. More hardship followed the family when the bar that her mother ran was destroyed by a fire.

At the age of four and a half, Mui started singing with her elder sister Ann. They used "Po-chu" and "Fong Fong" as their stage name respectively for their favourite actresses, Connie Chan (Chan Po-chu) and Josephine Siao (Siu Fong Fong). They would later adopt Yi Yi (依依) and Yi Na (依娜) as their stage names. Mui performed Chinese operas and pop songs in theatres, amusement parks and on the streets. Both Mui and her elder sister Ann performed in practically any nightclub that offered them a chance to make a living.

Mui studied at Kowloon Women's Welfare Club Li Ping Memorial School till she was primary four. She would transfer to another school and studied there till secondary one. While studying, Mui would be bullied by her school mates as singers were ridiculed and looked down upon.

At the age of 15, due to her high frequency of performances (up to six venues per day), she developed nodules on her vocal cords that affected her voice. Following the advice of the doctor, she took a year off and to keep herself occupied, she attended art lessons with her cousin. After a year, she started performing again despite the change in her vocal range, which lowered her voice by an octave.

== Career ==
=== Singing career ===
In 1982, encouraged by her sister, Mui competed in the first New Talent Singing Awards, organised by TVB and Capital Artists, in her stage name Yi Na. There, Mui got a big break by emerging champion with the song "The Windy Season" (風的季節), originally sung by Paula Tsui, beating over 3,000 contestants. Despite her title as "new talent" at that time, she had already been singing for more than 10 years performing as a busker from street and club performances during her childhood.

For winning the New Talent contest, Mui signed a recording contract with Capital Artists and released her debut album, Debt Heart (心債), under her real name with Capital Artists. The album drew a lukewarm response from the market. However, her subsequent albums, Red (赤色梅艷芳) (1983) and Leaping in the Spotlight (飛躍舞台) (1984) fared much better, as she developed her personal style and image, with guidance and support from fashion designer Eddie Lau. In 1983 and 1984, she won the RTHK Top 10 Gold Songs awards back to back.

Her winning streak continued when she won another major award in 1985, her first top 10 Jade Solid Gold Best Female Singer award. Thereafter, she won the award every year until 1989. She was awarded the Gold Songs Gold Awards (金曲金獎) in 1989 for the ballad "Song of the Sunset" (夕陽之歌), which became one of her signature songs throughout her career. In 1985, at the age of 21, Mui held her first concert lasting 15 nights (thus being one of the youngest singers to hold a concert at the Hong Kong Coliseum).

Beginning in late 1987 through early 1988, Mui held a series of 28 concerts at the Coliseum. This established a record at the time and dubbed Mui the title of "Ever Changing Anita Mui" (百變梅艷芳), which had become her trademark. Her popularity was also gaining prominence outside of Hong Kong, as she was invited to sing at the 1988 Summer Olympics opening ceremony in Seoul together with Janet Jackson as well as also performing her own solo with one of her hit songs of that year, "Blazing Red Lips (烈燄紅唇)".

On 12 February 1994, Mui was invited to hold a concert at the MGM Grand Garden Arena which is located on the Las Vegas Strip in Paradise, Nevada. The venue opened on 31 December 1993, with a concert by Barbra Streisand, and subsequent concerts by Luther Vandross, Mui herself and Janet Jackson. According to "The Last Manjusaka - Anita Mui's Performing Life" (revised edition), Madonna was also an audience at this concert. In 1995, Mui performed the song "Bad Girl" (a Cantonese cover of Sheena Easton's "Strut") in Guangzhou, China, where it was banned, as it was considered pornographic in nature. The government authorities in Guangzhou were infuriated when she chose to sing the song on the last day of her concert.

In 1990, during her birthday celebration with her fan club, Mui announced that she would put an end to receiving music awards to give a chance to newcomers. She held farewell concerts for 33 consecutive nights before retiring from the stage. At the age of 28, she stepped down from the industry, only to return from retirement in 1994. Mui mentored several Hong Kong newcomer singers who have since become successful, most notably Andy Hui, Denise Ho, Edmond Leung, the band Grasshopper, and Patrick Tam.

Mui at the "Anita Classic Moment Live 2003" concert in the Hong Kong Coliseum

Mui released 50 albums in total. Her best-selling album was the 1985 "Bad Girl" (壞女孩), which sold over 400,000 copies in a week (platinum 8x by Hong Kong's standards) and broke the selling record in Hong Kong. In 1994, she sold over 10 million albums. She was the first female singer in Hong Kong to achieve such sales result.

Mui performed in 300 concerts in her career. CNN compared her singing career with stars like Diana Ross and Madonna.

In 1998, aged 35, Mui was awarded the RTHK Golden Needle Award, being one of the youngest recipients to receive the award as a lifetime achievement.

In 2003, Mui announced that she had cervical cancer, from which her sister had also died. She held a series of eight shows at the Hong Kong Coliseum from 6–11 November and 14–15 November 2003, which were to be her last concerts before her death.

Her symbolic act was to "marry the stage", which was accompanied by her hit song "Sunset Melody" (夕陽之歌) as she exited the stage wearing a white wedding dress and veil. The last song she performed on stage was "Cherish When We Meet Again" (珍惜再會時), a rendition of The Manhattans' "Kiss and Say Goodbye", on 15 November 2003, where she was accompanied by her friends on stage.

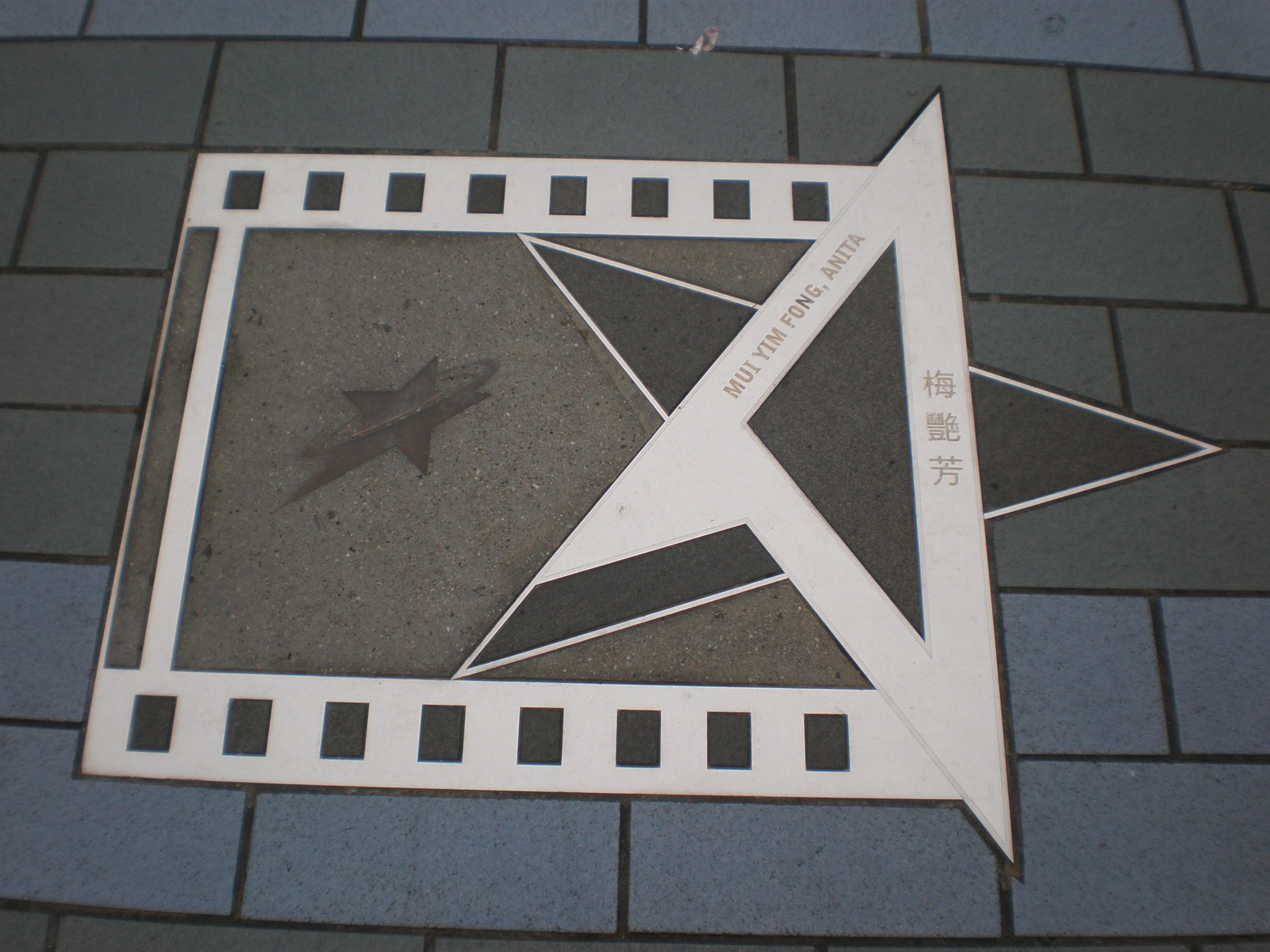
Mui's star on the Avenue of Stars

=== Acting career ===
Mui was also well known as an actress across Asia, as she starred in more than 40 films over a 20-year period. Her films were mainly of the action-thriller and martial arts variety, but she had also taken comedic and dramatic roles.

Her first acting award as a supporting actress was won at the Hong Kong Film Awards for her performance in Behind the Yellow Line (1984) alongside fellow Cantopop icon Leslie Cheung. Three years later in 1987, her performance in Stanley Kwan's Rouge, which also starred Cheung, won her the Best Actress Award at the Golden Horse Awards, as well as at the Hong Kong Film Awards in 1989. In the same year, she starred alongside Chow Yun-fat in Tsui Hark's A Better Tomorrow III: Love & Death in Saigon, which features her iconic ballad "Song of the Sunset". She also co-starred with Chow Yun-fat in the 1988 romantic comedy The Greatest Lover.

In 1990, she was cast in the titular role for Kawashima Yoshiko, a biopic of the flamboyant cross-dressing spy Yoshiko Kawashima based on the novel by Lilian Lee, who also authored the original novel and screenplay for Rouge. In 1992, she starred alongside comedy icon Stephen Chow in Justice, My Foot!, proving her calibre in the comedy genre. She also paired up with Stephen Chow in 1993 in Fight Back to School III. In the same year, she starred in The Heroic Trio with Michelle Yeoh and Maggie Cheung, and it proved to be one of her most popular action films. In 1994 and 1995, she found some international recognition by starring opposite Jackie Chan in The Legend of Drunken Master and Rumble in the Bronx. In 1996, she starred in Who's the Woman, Who's the Man with Leslie Cheung and Anita Yuen in a gender-bending love triangle story.

Later, in 1997, she also won another best supporting actress award at the Hong Kong Film Awards for her role in Eighteen Springs. In 2001, she starred in yet another Johnnie To comedy Wu Yen alongside Sammi Cheng and Cecilia Cheung as the lewd yet charming Emperor Qi. In 2002, she won Best Actress at the Changchun Film Festival Golden Deer Awards for Best Actress with her performance in July Rhapsody, which she starred alongside Jackie Cheung.

In 2003, Mui was originally cast for a major role for House of Flying Daggers but eventually declined due to her failing health before any of her scenes were filmed. After her death on 30 December 2003, director Zhang Yimou decided to alter the script to remove her character rather than recasting her. The film is dedicated to her memory.

Throughout her career, the tabloid magazines were unforgiving. Rumours relentlessly plagued Mui, who was accused of having tattoos on her arms and plastic surgery, being addicted to drugs, suicidal behavior and being linked to the death of a triad leader in the 1980s and 1990s. Rumours of affairs with leading actors also circulated.

== Politics, activism, and philanthropy ==
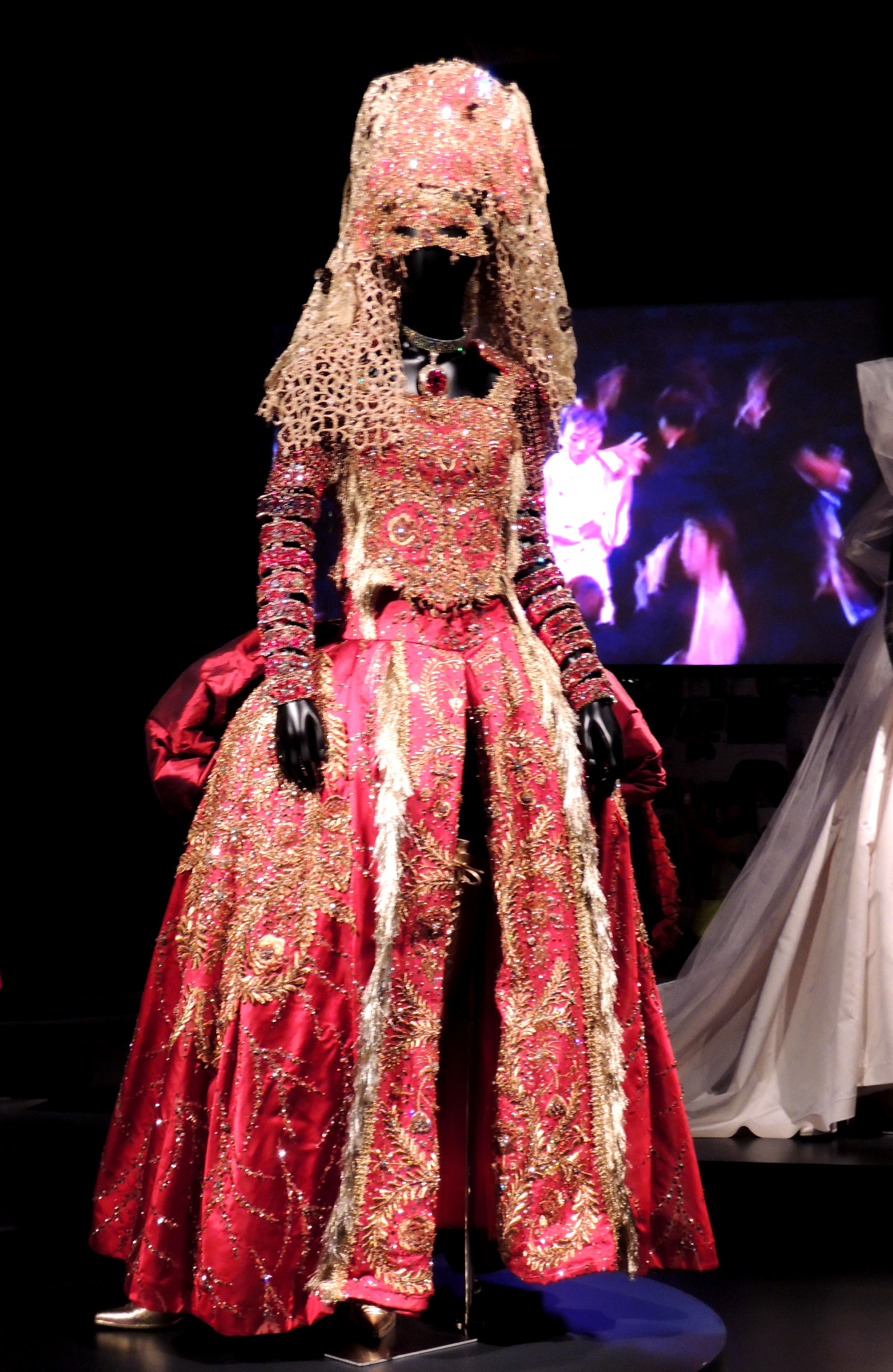
Mui's Classic Moment Live 2003 outfit on display at the Hong Kong Heritage Museum

Mui attended a local Hong Kong rally publicly calling for democracy during the 1989 Tiananmen Square protests that reportedly drew in 1 million people, which led to the founding of Hong Kong Alliance in Support of Patriotic Democratic Movements of China. She also performed at the 1989 Hong Kong concert for Chinese Democracy and vowed never to perform again in mainland China. Her rendition of Bloodstained Glory (血染的風采) has been praised as best among many. According to the posthumous memoirs of democracy activist Szeto Wah, Mui lent significant financial and material support to Operation Yellowbird, to help activists flee from China after the Tiananmen protests.

Mui was also actively involved in charitable projects throughout her career to give back to the community. After the Eastern China flood of 1991, she changed her mind about her boycott of mainland China and took part with other Hong Kong stars in a Beijing concert to raise funds for victims of the catastrophe.

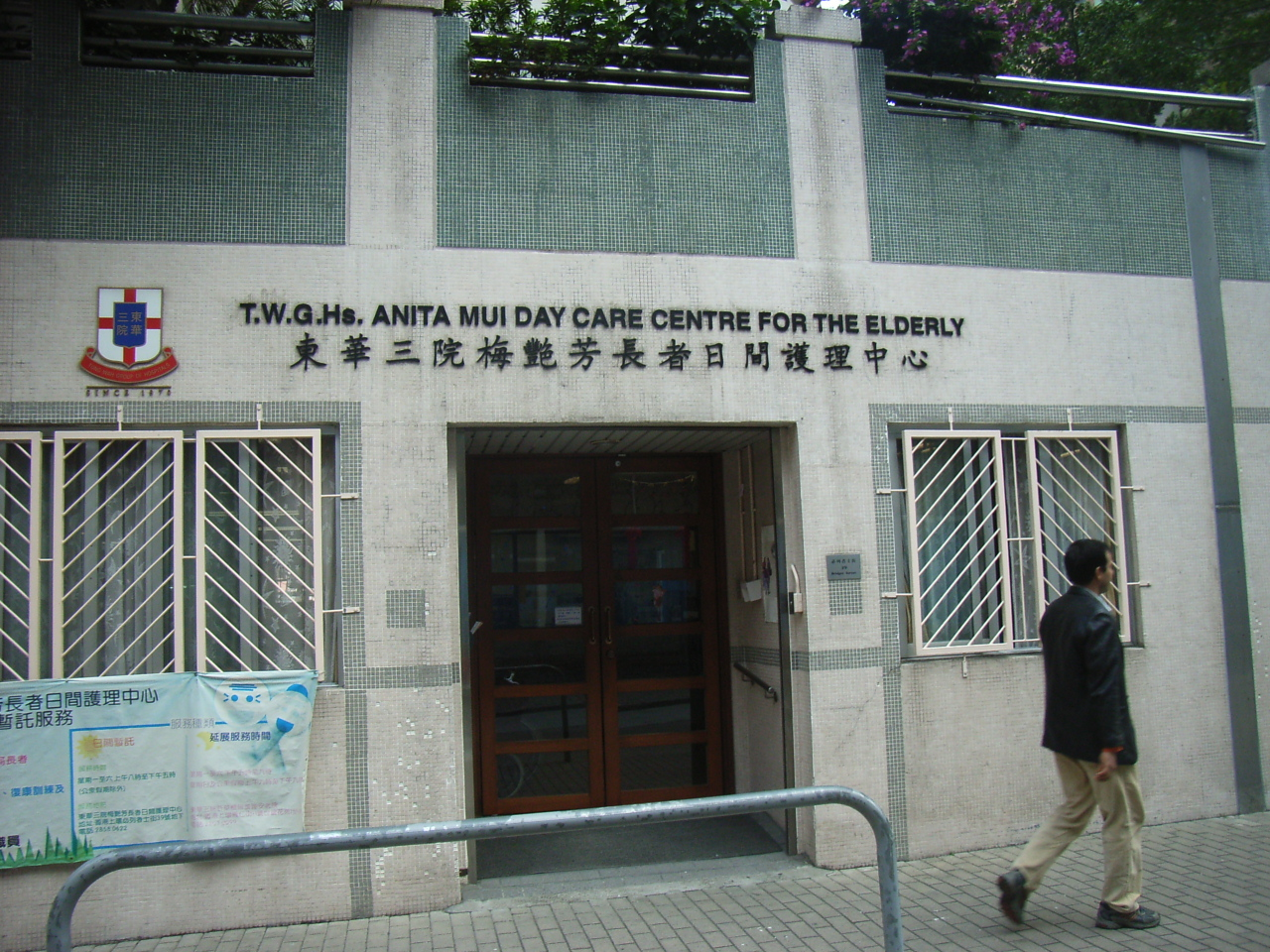
One of the care centres established by Mui.

The Tibetan red-crown Shamarpa (of Kagyudpa lineage) once said "She had a true heart. She was an unconventional woman and brought happiness to lots of people during her life." Her establishment of a nursing home in San Francisco, prompted the mayor of the city in 1992 to name 18 April as "Anita Mui Day". In 1993, she established the "Anita Mui True Heart Charity Foundation" (梅艷芳四海一心基金會). That same year, she was also one of the founders of the Hong Kong Performing Artistes Guild. The Canadian city of Toronto declared 23 October 1993 to be "Anita Mui Day".

During the severe acute respiratory syndrome (SARS) outbreak, she initiated a fundraising concert titled the 1:99 Concert to raise money for SARS-affected families, which attracted famous fellow celebrities such as Andy Lau and Jacky Cheung. She was also awarded the "Fighting Against SARS Award" from RTHK and the newspaper Ming Pao. In 2003, she wrote and published the book The Heart of the Modern Woman (現代女人心). Profits from the book went to the Children's Cancer Foundation.

== Personal life ==
In 1990, Mui began dating Benjamin Lam Kwok-bun, who was a member of the Jackie Chan Stunt Team. The relationship ended three years later. Despite rumours of her dating several men, Mui never married.

On 5 September 2003, Mui publicly announced that she had cervical cancer, from which her sister had also died.

== Death and legacy ==
Mui eventually succumbed to cervical cancer and died of respiratory complications leading to lung failure at Hong Kong Sanatorium and Hospital on 30 December 2003 at 2:50 am Hong Kong Time. She was 40 years old. Thousands of fans turned out for her funeral at North Point in January 2004 including Jackie Chan and Michelle Yeoh. Mui was cremated and her ashes are interred at the Po Lin Monastery's mausoleum on Lantau Island.

On 10 October 2026, it was reported that Mui's ashes, in an urn, was stolen from the mausoleum since 18 July when fans discovered it missing.

=== Will ===
In her will, Mui bequeathed two properties to her fashion designer, Eddie Lau, and the remainder to the Karen Trust – a trust she had set up and looked after by HSBC International Trustees. Its beneficiaries included her mother, Tam Mei-kam, and four nieces and nephews. The Karen Trust provided Tam with a life tenancy of HK$70,000 per month; upon Tam's death, the estate would go to the New Horizon Buddhist Association (妙境佛學會).

In 2005, Tam received a HK$705,000 lump-sum payment from the trust in May. She applied for and obtained a hardship grant to pay for medical expenditure of $50,000 in December; her application for funds from the estate to challenge the will was denied. In 2008, Mui's estate was estimated to be worth HK$100 million. Tam Mei-kam contested the will, arguing that Mui was mentally unfit when she executed her will in 2003, weeks before her death. The High Court ruled that Mui was of sound mind when she signed the will, and that she simply did not trust her mother with money.

Over the years, Tam mounted several legal challenges to the will, and succeeded in having the life tenancy varied to HK$120,000. Tam reportedly owed $2 million in legal costs in 2011. A fresh appeal by Tam and Mui's elder brother Peter Mui Kai-ming failed at the Court of Final Appeal in May 2011.

After that challenge, the Court of First Instance declared Tam bankrupt on 25 April 2012 for failing to pay legal fees, whilst allowing her to continue receiving her monthly allowance. In January 2013, the court ruled that the monthly tenancy of HK$120,000 to Tam, suspended since the previous July, would continue to be frozen due to mounting debts of the estate. Her brother was declared bankrupt on 17 January 2013 for failing to pay legal fees relating to the appeals. In May 2013, the court ordered the estate to pay Tam HK$20,000 a month for her living costs, as well as $240,000 to settle her overdue rent.

=== Legacy ===
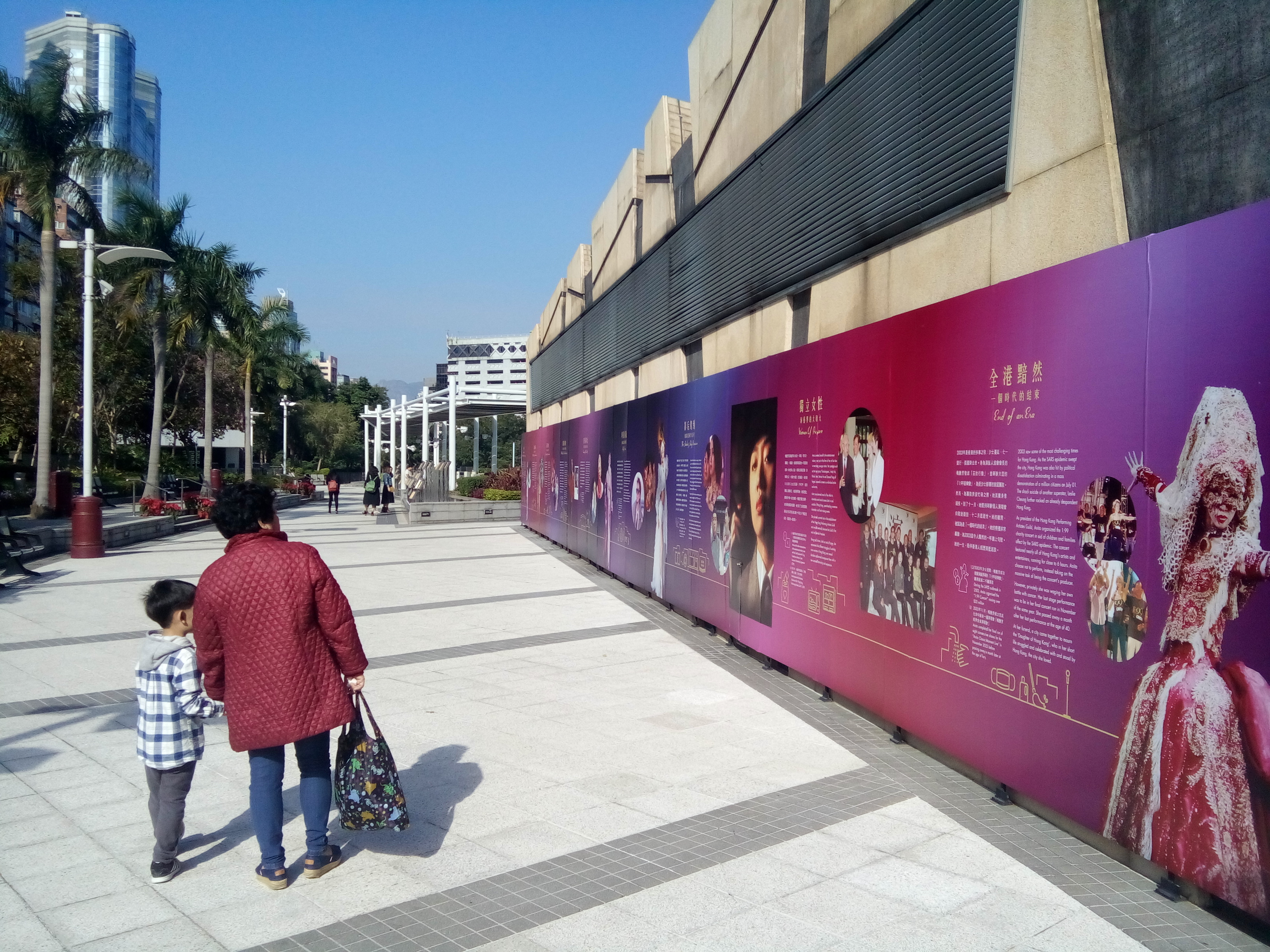
A Mui commemorative exhibition at TST East Waterfront Podium Garden in December 2016

In 1998, an ATV-produced television series Forever Love Song told a story of a character which was loosely based on that of Mui, but the character names were purposely changed. In 2007, a television series was produced in China titled Anita Mui Fei (梅艷芳菲) to tell the story of her life. The 42-episode series was broadcast by China Education Television. Some subjects, such as her suffering from cancer, Leslie Cheung's suicide and her mother's real estate dilemma, were avoided. Alice Chan portrayed Mui in the series.

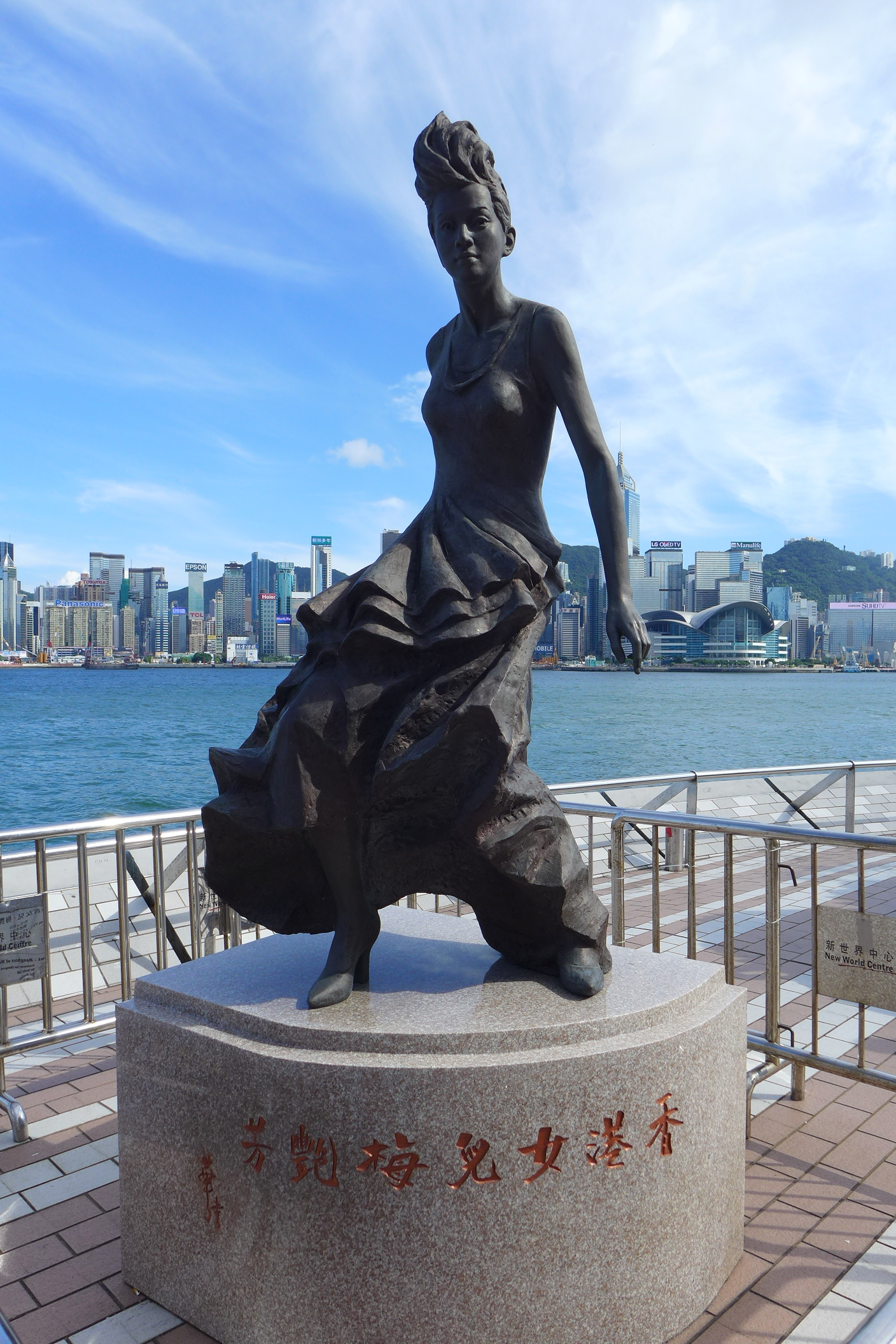
Bronze statue of Anita Mui in Hong Kong

On 23 September 2004, the Anita Mui True Heart Digital Multimedia Studio was opened at the University of Hong Kong. It included state-of-the-art equipment for digital audio and video editing. In Causeway Bay, an Anita Mui-themed cafe called Happiness Moon (囍月) is also dedicated to her legacy. On 11 October 2008, a show on TVB, titled Our Anita Mui (我們的梅艷芳), was dedicated to Mui. Many fans and off-stage personnel who worked with her had a chance to talk about their personal experiences with Mui. Singers who participated in the show included Andy Hui, Edmond Leung, and Stephanie Cheng. On 18 July 2014, a statue of Anita Mui was unveiled on Hong Kong's Avenue of Stars. In 2019, she was the subject of the film Dearest Anita. The film centered around individuals whose lives had been shaped by her work, including her fans and beneficiaries of her philanthropic work. In 2021, she was portrayed in the biopic Anita (梅艷芳), directed by Longman Leung. She was played by the Hong Kong model Louise Wong. Her work and stage costumes were displayed in an exhibition titled "Timeless Diva: Anita Mui" in the Hong Kong Heritage Museum lasting around eight months from 24 December 2023 to 2 September 2024, commemorating the 20th anniversary of her death. The exhibit included items from her private collection, including her TBS Award from the 1983 12th Tokyo Music Festival which was since housed in the museum, with courtesy of her former fashion designer and close friend Eddie Lau.

== Discography ==
=== Studio albums ===
==== Cantonese ====
Capital Artists Ltd.

- Sum chai (Debts of the Heart) 心債 (1982)
  Also includes solo recordings by members of the Hong Kong pop band, Siu Foo Deui (The Tigers) 小虎隊
- Red Anita Mui 赤色梅艷芳 (Chek sik Mui Yim-fong) (1983)
  Sometimes referred as Red 赤色 (Chek sik)
- Leaping in the Spotlight 飛躍舞台 (Fei yeok mou toi) (1984)
- Chi seoi lau nin (The Years Flow Like Water) 似水流年 (1985)
- Bad Girl 壞女孩 (Waai neoi haai) (1985)
- Yiu neoi (Temptress) 妖女 (1986)
- Burning Tango 似火探戈 (Tsi fo taam gwo) (1987)
- Flaming Red Lips 烈焰紅唇 (Leet yim hung seon) (1987)
- Mung leoi gung tzeoi (Drunk in Dreams Together) 夢裡共醉 (1988)
- Mellow 醉人情懷 (Zeoi yun tsing waai) (1988)
- We'll Be Together — EP (1988)
- Lady 淑女 (Sook neoi) Artists Ltd. (1989)
- In Brasil (sometimes referred as In Brazil) (1989)
- Say It If You Love Me 愛我便說愛我吧 (Ngoi ngo been soot ngoi ngo ba) (1989)
- Cover Girl 封面女郎 (Fung meen neoi long) (1990)
- Anita Mui (梅艷芳) (1991)
  Sometimes it is called Yook mong ye sau gaai (Jungle of Desire) 慾望野獸街
- It's Like This 是這樣的 (Si tze yeung dik) (1994)
  Sometimes, it is referred to as This Is Anita Mui 梅艷芳是這樣的 (Mui Yim Fong si tze yeung dik)
- The Woman of Songs 歌之女 (Goh tzi neoi) (1995)
- Illusions 鏡花水月 (Geng faa seoi yu) (1997)
- Variations 變奏 (Been tzau) (1998)
- Larger Than Life (1999)
- I'm So Happy (2000)

Go East Entertainment Co. Ltd.

- With (2002)

==== Japanese ====
English titles are official English titles used by record labels for below releases: Express (part of EMI Japan)

- Fantasy of Love / Debt of Love 唇をうばう前に / いのち果てるまで (kuchibiru o ubau mae ni / inochi hateru made) — EP (1983)
  "Fantasy of Love" is the Japanese version of the Cantonese song "Gau cheut ngo dik sum" (交出我的心). "Debt of Love" is the Japanese version of the Cantonese song "Sum chai" (心債).
- Marry Me Merry Me / nantonaku shiawase 日い花嫁 / なんとなく幸せ (nichii hanayome / nantonaku shiawase) — EP (1983)
  Marry Me Merry Me is sometimes referred as Marry Me Marry Me.

==== Mandarin ====
Rock Records

- Manjusaka 蔓珠莎華 (Man zhu sha hua) (1986)
- Ever-changing Anita Mui: Flaming Red Lips 百變梅艷芳:烈焰紅唇 (Bai bian Mei Yan-fang: lieyan hong chun) (1988)
- Intimate Lover 親密愛人 (Qinmi airen) (1991)

Other record labels

- Caution 小心 (Xiaoxin) — Capital Artists Ltd. (1994)
  Hong Kong edition of this album consists of Cantonese versions of some Mandarin songs.
- Flower Woman 女人花 (Nüren hua) — Music Impact Ltd. (1997)

Anita Music Collection Ltd.

- Moonlight on My Bed (or simply "Moonlight") 床前明月光 (Chuang qian ming yueguang) (1998)
- Nothing to Say 沒話說 (Mei huashuo) (1999)

=== Concert albums ===
Capital Artists Ltd.

- Anita Mui in Concert 87–88 百變梅艷芳再展光華87–88演唱會 – Cantonese (1988)
- Anita in Concert '90 百變梅艷芳夏日耀光華演唱會1990 – Cantonese (1990)
- Anita Mui Live in Concert 1995 一個美麗的回響演唱會 – Cantonese/Mandarin (1995)
- Anita Mui Final Concert 1992 百變梅艷芳告別舞台演唱會 – Cantonese/Mandarin (2006)

Music Impact Ltd.

- Anita Mui 1997 Live in Taipei 芳蹤乍現台北演唱會實錄 – Mandarin (1997)

Music Nation Records Company Ltd.

- Anita Mui Fantasy Gig 2002 梅艷芳極夢幻演唱會2002 – Cantonese/Mandarin (2002)

=== Compilation albums ===
Compilations released after 2004 are not included here: Capital Artists Ltd. (Cantonese)

- The Legend of the Pop Queen: Part I and Part II (1992)
- Lifetime of Fantasies 情幻一生 (Ching waan yat sang) (1993)
- Change 變 (Been) (1993)
- Wong tze tzi fung (Majestic) 皇者之風 (1993)
- Dramatic Life 戲劇人生 (Hei kek yan sang) (1993)
- Love Songs 情歌 (Ching goh) (1997)
- Love Songs II 情歌 II (Ching goh II) (1998)
- Anita's 45 Songs 眾裡尋芳45首 (2001)
- Tribute to Anita Mui 梅‧憶錄 (2004)
- Faithfully 梅艷芳 (2008)
- In the Memories of Anita Mui 追憶似水芳華 (2013)

Other record labels

- Anita Classic Moment Live 梅艷芳經典金曲演唱會 – Mui Music Ltd. (Cantonese/Mandarin) (2004)
- Anita Mui Forever 永遠的... 梅艷芳 – BMG Taiwan Inc. (Mandarin) (2004)

=== Singles ===
==== 1980s ====
Title	Year	Peak chart positions				Album
Title	Year	RTHK	TVB	903	997	Album
"Debts of the Heart 心債"	1982	1	—	—	—	Debts of the Heart 心債
"Red Doubts 赤的疑惑"	1983	1	—	—	—	Red Anita Mui 赤色梅艷芳
"Hand Over My Heart 交出我的心"	1983	3	—	—	—	Red Anita Mui 赤色梅艷芳
"Red Impact 赤的沖擊"	1983	—	—	—	—	Red Anita Mui 赤色梅艷芳
"Leaping in the Spotlight 飛躍舞台"	1984	6	—	—	—	Leaping in the Spotlight 飛躍舞台
"Don't Believe Love Is a Crime 不信愛有罪"	1984	1	—	—	—	Leaping in the Spotlight 飛躍舞台
"The Years Flow Like Water 似水流年"	1984	1	—	—	—	The Years Flow Like Water 似水流年
"Dream Embrace 夢幻的擁抱"	1985	—	—	—	—	The Years Flow Like Water 似水流年
"Manjusaka 蔓珠莎華"	1985	1	—	—	—	The Years Flow Like Water 似水流年
"Towards a New Day 邁向新一天"	1985	3	—	—	—	華星影視新節奏(第二輯)
"Bad Girl 壞女孩"	1985	—	—	—	—	Bad Girl 壞女孩
"Flame on the Iceberg 冰山大火"	1986	1	9	—	—	Bad Girl 壞女孩
"Walking My Way Alone 孤身走我路"	1986	3	—	—	—	Bad Girl 壞女孩
"Dream Partner 夢伴"	1986	—	1	—	—	Bad Girl 壞女孩
"Temptress 妖女"	1986	—	3	7	—	Temptress 妖女
"Break the Iceberg 將冰山劈開"	1986	—	1	1	—	Temptress 妖女
"Love Warrior 愛將"	1986	3	3	1	—	Temptress 妖女
"Gossip Girl 緋聞中的女人"	1987	—	6	16	—	Temptress 妖女
"Burning Tango 似火探戈"	1987	1	1	1	—	Burning Tango 似火探戈
"Decorated Tears 裝飾的眼淚"	1987	1	1	6	—	Burning Tango 似火探戈
"Cherish When We Meet Again 珍惜再會時"	1987	—	3	—	—	Burning Tango 似火探戈
"Relax 放鬆"	1987	—	7	14	—	Burning Tango 似火探戈
"Oh No! Oh Yes!"	1987	—	—	17	—	Burning Tango 似火探戈
"Flaming Red Lips 烈焰紅唇"	1987	1	1	1	—	Flaming Red Lips 烈焰紅唇
"Church of Sadness 傷心教堂"	1987	1	1	8	—	Flaming Red Lips 烈焰紅唇
"If I Were a Man 假如我是男人"	1988	—	—	9	—	Flaming Red Lips 烈焰紅唇
"Rouge 胭脂扣"	1988	—	9	16	—	Flaming Red Lips 烈焰紅唇
"Better Not To Meet 不如不見"	1988	1	1	6	—	Drunk in Dreams Together 夢裡共醉
"Drunk in Dreams Together 夢裡共醉"	1988	—	1	13	—	Drunk in Dreams Together 夢裡共醉
"Stand By Me"	1988	1	5	1	—	Drunk in Dreams Together 夢裡共醉
"Love You, Miss You 愛你，想你"	1988	—	—	25	—	Drunk in Dreams Together 夢裡共醉
"Lady 淑女"	1989	1	1	1	—	Lady 淑女
"Love at First Dance 一舞傾情"	1989	1	2	6	—	Lady 淑女
"Night Leopard 黑夜的豹"	1989	1	1	10	—	Lady 淑女
"Little Angel 小天使"	1989	5	—	15	—	親親小天使歌集
"United in Heart 四海一心"	1989	—	—	23	—	The Legend of the Pop Queen Part I
"Sunset Melody 夕陽之歌"	1989	1	1	2	—	In Brasil
"Summer Lover 夏日戀人"	1989	1	1	1	—	In Brasil
"Say It If You Love Me 愛我便說愛我吧"	1989	—	7	15	—	In Brasil
"Life of Passion 火紅色人生"	1989	—	—	14	—	In Brasil

==== 1990s ====
Title	Year	Peak chart positions				Album
Title	Year	RTHK	TVB	903	997	Album
"Cover Girl 封面女郎"	1990	1	1	1	—	Cover Girl 封面女郎
"Yelia 耶利亞"	1990	1	1	5	—	Cover Girl 封面女郎
"Heart Remains Cold 心仍是冷"	1990	1	1	3	—	Cover Girl 封面女郎
"Heart Remains Cold (solo) 心仍是冷"	1990	—	—	5	—	Cover Girl 封面女郎
"Facing Fate with a Smile 笑看風雲變"	1990	—	—	10	—	Cover Girl 封面女郎
"Return 似是故人來"	1990	1	1	1	—	Music Factory. Queen's Road East
"The Road Has Come to an End 路...始終告一段"	1990	—	—	13	—	The Legend of the Pop Queen Part II
"Jungle of Desire 慾望野獸街"	1991	1	1	1	—	Jungle of Desire 慾望野獸街
"What Day 何日"	1991	20	—	26	—	The Legend of the Pop Queen Part II
"Dream Temptress 夢姬"	1991	1	1	1	—	Jungle of Desire 慾望野獸街
"Faithfully"	1991	—	3	17	—	Jungle of Desire 慾望野獸街
"Godfather's Woman 教父的女人"	1991	—	—	25	—	Jungle of Desire 慾望野獸街
"Touch"	1991	1	—	3	—	The Legend of the Pop Queen Part I
"Too Late to Turn Back 回頭已是百年身"	1992	4	—	5	—	The Legend of the Pop Queen Part I
"It's Like This 是這樣的"	1992	—	—	18	—	The Legend of the Pop Queen Part I
"Intimate Lover 親密愛人"	1992	9	—	8	—	Intimate Lover 親密愛人
"Woman's Heart 女人心"	1993	—	—	15	—	Drama of Life 戲劇人生
"Where Does Love Belong 情歸何處"	1994	1	1	1	1	It's Like This 是這樣的
"In the Hazy Rainy Night 朦朧夜雨裡"	1994	1	—	5	—	It's Like This 是這樣的
"Like the Night 如夜"	1994	1	1	6	1	It's Like This 是這樣的
"Grateful 感激"	1994	11	—	10	—	It's Like This 是這樣的
"It's Not Me 他不是我"	1994	10	—	—	—	IFPI 100% 正版
"Free Your Head and Mind 放開你的頭腦"	1994	3	—	4	1	Caution 小心
"Caution 小心"	1994	—	—	22	—	Caution 小心
"Drunk Twilight 醉矇矓"	1994	—	—	13	—	Caution 小心
"The Song Girl 歌之女"	1995	1	—	4	1	The Song Girl 歌之女
"Lonely Love 愛我的只有我"	1995	—	—	14	—	The Song Girl 歌之女
"Total Eclipse 心全蝕"	1995	—	—	14	—	The Song Girl 歌之女
"Love Does Not Compromise 愛是沒餘地"	1995	—	—	27	—	The Song Girl 歌之女
"We Cried 我們都哭了"	1995	—	—	6	—	We Cried 我們都哭了
"Night Snake 夜蛇"	1997	10	—	12	—	Illusions 鏡花水月
"Embrace the One in Front of You 抱緊眼前人"	1997	1	1	4	1	Illusions 鏡花水月
"Flower Woman 女人花"	1997	—	—	—	—	Flower Woman 女人花
"Day and Night 朝朝暮暮"	1998	11	—	9	—	Love Songs 情歌
"You Keep Me Here 你留我在此"	1998	17	—	—	17	Variations 變奏
"Beautiful Penang 檳城艷"	1998	—	—	13	—	Variations 變奏
"East Mountain Rainy West Mountain Sunny 東山飄雨西山晴"	1998	8	8	—	—	Variations 變奏
"Moonlight on My Bed 床前明月光"	1998	3	3	16	3	Moonlight on My Bed 床前明月光
"The Wolf Love the Sheep 愛上狼的羊"	1998	3	—	—	9	Moonlight on My Bed 床前明月光
"Brilliant Stage 艷舞台"	1999	3	4	3	7	Larger Than Life
"Nausea 不快不吐"	1999	—	—	10	—	Larger Than Life
"Women's Problem 女人煩"	1999	—	—	5	—	Larger Than Life
"Hanging the Bell on the Rattan 長藤掛銅鈴"	1999	5	2	9	—	Nothing to Say 沒話說
"Dont Be a Woman in Your Next Life 下輩子別再做女人"	1999	—	7	—	6	Nothing to Say 沒話說

==== 2000s ====
Title	Year	Peak chart positions				Album
Title	Year	RTHK	TVB	903	997	Album
"I'm So Happy 我很快樂"	2000	9	—	1	3	I'm So Happy
"Lessons in Love 愛的教育"	2000	13	—	6	5	I'm So Happy
"Welcome Bed 牀呀! 牀!"	2000	3	3	10	5	I'm So Happy
"Glamour Forever 芳華絕代"	2001	1	1	1	—	With
"Love Is Difficult 相愛很難"	2002	1	1	1	1	With
"Single Woman 單身女人"	2002	—	—	5	7	With
"Women's Sorrows (duet) 女人之苦"	2002	—	—	—	9	On Hits (Special Edition)
"Return (Live Version) 似是故人來"	2003	—	—	—	9	—

== Tour setlists ==
梅艷芳盡顯光華 Anita Mui in Concert '85
1. 留住你今晚
2. 點起你欲望
3. 魅力的散發
4. 心債
5. 赤的疑惑
6. 交出我的心
7. 信
8. 24小時之吻 (梅艷芳、草蜢 合唱)
9. 祝你好運 (梅艷芳、草蜢 合唱)
10. 小虎子闖世界 (梅艷芳、小虎隊 合唱)
11. 歌衫淚影
12. 殘月碎春風
13. Medley:
  1. 再共舞
  2. 紗籠女郎
  3. 再共舞 Reprise
14. 滾滾紅塵
15. IQ博士
16. 風的季節 (梅艷芳、梅愛芳 合唱)
17. 中國戲曲
18. The Way We Were
19. 待嫁女兒心
20. 日本演歌 (梅艷芳、黎小田 合唱)
21. 合唱歌 (梅艷芳、Guest 合唱)
22. 夢伴
23. 別離的無奈
24. 冰山大火
25. 幻影
26. 蔓珠莎華
27. 夢幻的擁抱
28. 抱你十個世紀
29. 孤身走我路
30. 壞女孩
31. 顛多一千晚
32. 似水流年
33. 不了情
34. 逝去的愛
百變梅艷芳再展光華 Anita Mui in Concert 87–88
1. Medley:
  1. 冰山大火
  2. 征服他
  3. 心魔
  4. 冰山大火 Reprise
2. 痴痴愛一次
3. 緋聞中的女人
4. 妖女
5. 將冰山劈開
6. 愛將 (梅艷芳、草蜢 合唱)
7. 飛躍千個夢 (草蜢 主唱)
8. 戀之火
9. 殘月醉春風
10. 夢
11. 紗籠女郎
12. Medley:
  1. 嘆息
  2. 歌衫淚影
  3. 千枝針刺在心
13. 胭脂扣
14. 夢伴
15. 壞女孩
16. 放鬆
17. 暫時厭倦
18. 蔓珠莎華
19. 她的前半生
20. 烈燄紅唇
21. 尋愛
22. Oh No! Oh Yes!
23. 裝飾的眼淚
24. 無淚之女
25. 似火探戈
26. 魅力的天橋
27. 最後一次
28. 傷心教堂
29. 似水流年
30. 珍惜再會時
百變梅艷芳夏日耀光華演唱會 Anita Mui in Concert '90
1. 愛我便說愛我吧
2. 正歌
3. 第四十夜
4. 夏日戀人
5. 一舞傾情
6. 難得有情人
7. 愛情基本法
8. 心窩已瘋
9. 心仍是冷 (梅艷芳、倫永亮 合唱)
10. 明天你是否依然愛我 (梅艷芳、倫永亮 合唱)
11. 你知道我在等你嗎 (倫永亮獨唱)
12. Stand By Me
13. Dancing Boy
14. 玫瑰、玫瑰、我愛你
15. 不如不見
16. 最愛是誰
17. 倦
18. 夢裡共醉 (音樂/舞蹈)
19. 焚心以火
20. 脂胭扣
21. 黑夜的豹
22. Medley:
  1. 壞女孩
  2. 妖女
  3. 烈燄紅唇
  4. 淑女
23. 封面女郎
24. 她的前半生
25. 孤身走我路
26. 龍的傳人
27. 血染的風采
28. 蔓珠莎華
29. 夕陽之歌
30. 耶利亞
31. Encore:
  1. 似水流年
  2. 心債
  3. 夢伴
  4. 冰山大火
  5. 我未失方向
  6. 赤的疑惑
  7. 再共舞
  8. 珍惜再會時
百變梅艷芳告別舞台演唱會 Anita Mui Final Concert
1. 蔓珠莎華
2. Faithfully
3. 夢幻的擁抱
4. 夢姬
5. 妖女
6. 緋聞中的女人
7. 假如我是男人
8. Touch
9. 似火探戈
10. 不信愛有罪
11. 這一個夜
12. Jungle Medley:
  1. 黑夜的豹
  2. 慾望野獸街
  3. 夜貓夫人
  4. 慾望野獸街 Reprise
13. 教父的女人
14. 壞女孩
15. 胭脂扣
16. 啼笑因緣
17. 每當變幻時
18. 似是故人來
19. 幾多
20. 逝去的愛
21. 赤的疑惑
22. 夕陽之歌
23. 親密愛人
24. IQ博士
25. 似水流年
26. 心肝寶貝
27. 孤身走我路
28. 夢伴
29. Stand By Me
30. 珍惜再會時
31. 回頭已是百年身
情歸何處II 梅艷芳感激歌迷演唱會 Anita Mui Appreciating the Fans Concert
1. 封面女郎 Introduction
2. Medley:
  1. 淑女
  2. 壞女孩
  3. 夢伴
  4. 妖女
3. 親密愛人
4. Medley:
  1. 新鴛鴦蝴蝶夢
  2. 只羡鴛鴦不羡仙
5. 女人心
6. 激光中
7. 黑夜的豹
8. 放開你的頭腦
9. 感激
10. 珍惜再會時
梅艷芳一個美麗的回響演唱會 Anita Mui in Concert '95
1. Overture
2. 夢伴
3. We'll Be Together
4. Faithfully
5. 愛是沒餘地
6. 傳說 Interlude
7. 莫問一生
8. 烈女
9. 耶利亞
10. 夢姬
11. 等著你回來 Interlude
12. 得不到的愛情
13. Medley:
  1. 何日
  2. 李香蘭
  3. 何日 Reprise
14. 願今宵一起醉死
15. Interlude
16. Stand By Me
17. 是這樣的
18. Medley:
  1. 愛是個傳奇
  2. 粉紅色的一生
19. 明星
20. 女人心
21. Medley: (梅艷芳、倫永亮 合唱)
  1. 分分鐘需要你
  2. 浪子心聲
  3. 胭脂扣
  4. 情人
  5. 明天我要嫁給你
  6. 憑著愛
  7. 心仍是冷
  8. 分分鐘需要你 Reprise
22. 情歸何處
23. 感激
24. Interlude
25. Touch
26. 疾風
27. 愛我便說愛我吧
28. 歌之女
29. 似水流年
百變梅艷芳演唱會 Anita Mui in Concert 1999
1. 是這樣的
2. 艷舞台
3. 淑女
4. 抱緊眼前人
5. 愛上狼的羊
6. 女人心
7. 愛的感覺
8. 緋聞中的女人
9. Touch
10. 壞女孩
11. 似水流年
12. Medley:
  1. 似是故人來
  2. 心肝寶貝
  3. 胭脂扣
  4. 緣份
  5. 有心人
  6. 路...始終告一段
  7. 何日
  8. 夕陽之歌
13. 夜蛇
14. 烈艷紅唇
15. 抱你十個世紀
16. 眼中釘
17. 一生何求
18. 似夢迷離
19. 但願人長久
20. 不快不吐
21. Medley:
  1. 你真美麗
  2. 第二春
  3. 夢
  4. 戀之火
  5. 今宵多珍重
  6. 我要
  7. 給我一個吻
  8. 玫瑰、玫瑰、我愛你
22. 情歸何處
23. 你留我在此
24. 將冰山劈開
25. 床前明月光
26. 心窩已瘋
27. Big Bad Girl
28. 夢伴
梅艷芳極夢幻演唱會 Anita Mui Fantasy Gig
1. Opening
2. Stand By Me
3. 將冰山劈開
4. 愛我便說愛我吧
5. 長藤掛銅鈴
6. Medley:
  1. 艷舞台
  2. 烈焰紅唇
7. Medley:
  1. 憑甚麼
  2. 假如我是男人
  3. 黑夜的豹
8. 蔓珠莎華
9. Oh No! Oh Yes!
10. Wonderful Night
11. Faithfully
12. 是這樣的
13. 夢幻的擁抱
14. 夢姬
15. 烈女
16. 心債
17. 一舞傾情
18. 約會
19. 胭脂扣
20. 床前明月光
21. 心窩已瘋
22. 芳華絕代
23. 床呀！床！
24. 似水流年
25. 似是故人來
26. 抱緊眼前人
27. 親密愛人
28. Medley:
  1. 孤身走我路
  2. 夕陽之歌
29. Medley:
  1. 愛將
  2. 壞女孩
  3. 淑女
  4. 妖女
  5. 放開你的頭腦
  6. 夢伴
  7. 冰山大火
梅艷芳經典金曲演唱會 Anita Classic Moment Live
1. Overture
2. 夢裡共醉
3. 是這樣的
4. 抱緊眼前人
5. 心肝寶貝
6. Medley:
  1. 何日
  2. 李香蘭
  3. 何日 Reprise
7. 心債
8. 第四十夜
9. 夏日戀人
10. 'O Sole Mio
11. 親密愛人
12. Medley:
  1. 愛情的代價
  2. 我願意
  3. 似夢迷離
  4. 今生今世
  5. 深愛著你
13. 孤身走我路
14. 胭脂扣
15. 似是故人來
16. 似水流年
17. Sukiyaki
18. 花月佳期
19. 夕陽之歌

== Filmography ==
=== Film ===
Year	Title	Role	Notes	Ref.
1983	The Sensational Pair 叔侄．縮窒	Herself		
1983	Mad Mad 83 瘋狂83	Red Line Girl		
1983	Let's Make Laugh 表錯七日情	Fong		
1984	Behind the Yellow Line	Anita		
1985	The Musical Singer 歌舞昇平	Jannie Fong		
1985	Lucky Diamond 祝您好運	Ah Ji		
1985	Young Cops 青春差館	Man Rou Yim		
1986	Why, Why, Tell Me Why? 壞女孩	Fong Yim Mui		
1986	Happy Din Don 歡樂叮噹	Singer in Club		
1986	Last Song in Paris	Anita Chou		
1986	100 Ways to Murder Your Wife	Fang		
1986	Chocolate Inspector	Kiu-kiu		
1987	Scared Stiff	Miss Mui		
1987	Happy Bigamist 一屋兩妻	Yuan Tung/Park		
1987	Troubling Couples 開心勿語	Mui Tai-heung		
1988	Rouge	Fleur(Ju Fa/Ru Hua)		
1988	One Husband too Many 一妻兩夫	Yuan Tung/Park(Pai Jia)		
1988	The Greatest Lover 公子多情	Anita Ko		
1988	Three Wishes 黑心鬼	Mui Tsai-fa, Mui Lan-fa		
1989	The Canton Godfather	Luming Yang		
1989	A Better Tomorrow 3: Love & Death in Saigon	Chow Ying-kit		
1990	The Fortune Code	Jane		
1990	Kawashima Yoshiko	Yoshiko Kawashima		
1990	Shanghai Shanghai 亂世兒女	Mary Sung Chia-pi		
1991	The Top Bet	Mei		
1991	Au Revoir, Mon Amour 何日君再來	Ng Mui Yee		
1991	The Banquet	Herself		
1991	Saviour of the Soul	Yiu May-kwan, Yiu May-wai		
1992	Justice, My Foot	Madam Sung		
1992	Moon Warriors	Yue Ya-er/Princess		
1993	Fight Back to School III	Judy Tong Wong		
1993	The Heroic Trio	Tung/Wonder Woman/Shadow Fox		
1993	The Mad Monk	Goddess of Mercy		
1993	The Magic Crane	Pak Wan-fai		
1993	Executioners	Tung/Wonder Woman/Dorothy		
1994	Drunken Master II	Wong Fei-Hung's Step-Mother, Ling		
1995	Rumble in the Bronx	Elaine/Yi Ling		
1995	My Father is a Hero	Insp. Fong Yat Wa		
1996	Twinkle Twinkle Lucky Stars 1996 運財智叻星	Herself		
1996	Who's the Woman, Who's the Man	Fan Fan, Fong Yim Mui		
1997	Eighteen Springs	Gu Manlu		
2001	Wu yen	Emperor Qi (King Xuan of Qi)		
2001	Wu yen	Great Great Great Great Great Ancestor (Duke Huan of Qi)		
2001	Midnight Fly 慌心假期	Michelle To		
2001	Let's Sing Along 男歌女唱	Chu Wai-tak		
2001	Dance of a Dream	Tina Cheung		
2002	July Rhapsody	Chan Man-ching		

=== Television ===
Year	Title	Role	Notes	Ref.
1983	Summer Kisses, Winter Tears 香江花月夜	Fong Chi Mei		

== Accolades ==
- Top 10 Jade Solid Gold Most Popular Female Artist Award 1985–1989
- Top 10 Jade Solid Gold Top 10 song awards ('壞女孩') 1985
- Top 10 Jade Solid Gold Gold Song Gold Award for Sunset Melody ('夕陽之歌') 1989
- Hong Kong Film Awards for Best Supporting Actress 1985 for Behind the Yellow Line
- Golden Horse Award for Best Leading Actress 1988 for Rouge
- Asia-Pacific Film Festival Awards for Best Actress 1989 for Rouge
- Hong Kong Film Award for Best Actress 1989 for Rouge
- Hong Kong Film Awards for Best Supporting Actress 1998 for Eighteen Springs
- Golden Bauhinia Awards for Best Supporting Actress 1998 for Eighteen Springs
- RTHK Golden Needle Award 1998
- Golden Deer Awards for Best Actress 2002 for July Rhapsody

== See also ==
- Asteroid 55384 Muiyimfong
- Anita (2021 film)
- Music of Hong Kong
- Cinema of Hong Kong

Awards and achievements
Preceded by None	Hong Kong Film Award for Best Supporting Actress; 1985 for Behind the Yellow Line	Succeeded by Deannie Yip for My Name Ain't Suzie
Preceded by Sylvia Chang	Golden Horse Awards for Best Actress; 1987 for Rouge	Succeeded by Carol Cheng
Preceded by Josephine Siao for The Wrong Couples	Hong Kong Film Award for Best Actress; 1989 for Rouge	Succeeded by Maggie Cheung for A Fishy Story
Preceded by Shu Qi for Viva Erotica	Hong Kong Film Award for Best Supporting Actress; 1998 for Eighteen Springs	Succeeded by Shu Qi for Portland Street Blues
Preceded by Alan Tam	Golden Needle Award; 1998	Succeeded by Leslie Cheung
Preceded by Cho Tat Wah, Shek Kin	Professional Spirit Award; 2004	Succeeded by Jackie Chan, Yu Mo Wan
