= CETV =

CETV may mean or refer to:

- China Education Television (中国教育电视台), a satellite education channel in the People's Republic of China
- China Entertainment Television (CETV Family Channel) (華僑娛樂電視廣播有限公司 (華娛電視家庭台)), a satellite entertainment channel in Hong Kong
- Central European Media Enterprises (sticker symbol CETV)
- CETV (Praça TV), a Brazilian local news program
