= Bloodstained Glory =

1986 Chinese patriotic military song

"Blood-stained Glory" (Traditional Chinese: 血染的風采, Simplified Chinese: 血染的风采) is a Chinese patriotic military song written in 1986, originally used to commemorate those who died during the Sino-Vietnamese War. Many singers have covered the song, including Peng Liyuan, Dong Wenhua and Anita Mui. Following the 1989 Tiananmen Square protests, the song was adopted by the pro-democracy movement in Hong Kong, becoming known as a "democracy song" (民主歌曲) with a meaning distinct from its original military context.
