= 1983 RTHK Top 10 Gold Songs Awards =

Hong Kong music awards ceremony

The 1983 RTHK Top 10 Gold Songs Awards (Chinese: 1983年度十大中文金曲得獎) was held in 1984 for the 1983 music season.

== Top 10 song awards ==
The top 10 songs (十大中文金曲) of 1983 are as follows.

Song name in Chinese	Artist	Composer	Lyricist
赤的疑惑	Anita Mui	Shunichi Tokura	Cheng Kwok Kong
遲來的春天	Alan Tam	Yan Fook-fong (因幅晃)	Jolland Chan Kim Wo
情義兩心堅	Teresa Cheung	Joseph Koo	Tang Wai Hung
何必曾相識	Ken Choi	Dominic Chow	Cheng Kwok Kong
常在我心間	Michael Kwan Tracy Huang	J.Christopher W.Thompoon M.James	Andrew Lam
你的眼神	Tsai Chin	Sou Lai (蘇來)	Sou Lai (蘇來)
偏偏喜歡你	Danny Chan	Danny Chan	Cheng Kwok Kong
要是有緣	Kenny Bee	Kenny Bee	Lou Wing Keng (盧永強)
隨想曲	Paula Tsui	Joseph Koo	Cheng Kwok Kong
世間始終你好	Roman Tam Jenny Tseng	Joseph Koo	Wong Jim

== Other awards ==
Award	Song or album (if available)	Recipient
Best C-pop song award (最佳中文流行歌曲獎)	天籟	Lowell Lo
Best C-pop lyrics award (最佳中文流行歌詞獎)	隨想曲	Cheng Kwok Kong
Best new prospect award (最有前途新人獎)	-	Tsai Chin
Best record design award (最佳唱片封套設計獎)	-	Alan Chan (陳幼堅); Coek Lam (焯林)
Best record producer award (最佳唱片監製獎)	淡淡幽情	Tony Tang
RTHK honour award (香港電台榮譽獎)	-	Eugenio Nonoy O'Campo
