= A Better Tomorrow III: Love & Death in Saigon =

1989 Hong Kong film by Tsui Hark

- Film poster

Chinese name
- Traditional Chinese: 英雄本色3-夕陽之歌
- Simplified Chinese: 英雄本色3-夕阳之歌
Transcriptions
Standard Mandarin
- Hanyu Pinyin: Yīng Xióng Běn Sè Sān – Xī Yáng Zhī Gē
Yue: Cantonese
- Jyutping: Jing1 Hung4 Bun2 Sik1 Saam1 – Zik6 Joeng4 Zi1 Go1
- Directed by: Tsui Hark
- Screenplay by: Edward Leung; Tai Foo-ho
- Story by: Tsui Hark
- Produced by: Tsui Hark; John Woo
- Starring: Chow Yun-fat; Anita Mui; Tony Leung
- Cinematography: Horace Wong; Yun Chun-wah; Chik Kim-kiy
- Edited by: Marco Mak; Tsui Hark; David Wu
- Music by: Lowell Lo
- Production companies: Film Workshop; Golden Princess Film Production
- Distributed by: Golden Princess Film Production
- Release date: 20 October 1989 (Hong Kong)
- Running time: 119 minutes
- Country: Hong Kong
- Languages: Cantonese; English; Vietnamese
- Box office: HK$18,476,116

A Better Tomorrow III: Love & Death in Saigon (Chinese: 英雄本色3-夕陽之歌) is a 1989 Hong Kong action drama film directed, co-written, and co-produced by Tsui Hark, the producer behind the first two films in the series. It is a prequel to John Woo's A Better Tomorrow (1986) and A Better Tomorrow II (1987). John Woo wrote a screenplay for a third installment, but he never got to direct it due to artistic differences with Tsui during the filming of the second film. Instead, the original screenplay later became Bullet in the Head. The two films have many parallels, most notably, both being set in the Vietnam War.

The film stars Chow Yun-fat, who reprises his role of Mark Lee from the first film, Tony Leung Ka-fai and Anita Mui. The story shows how Mark became the character he was in the original film. The second part of the title, Love & Death in Saigon (夕陽之歌 or Song of the Setting Sun in Chinese), is also the title song for the movie and was sung by Mui.

== Plot ==
In 1974, during the final days of the Vietnam War and a few years before the events of the first film, Mark Lee and Chow Ying-kit arrive in Saigon, Lee intends to bring his uncle and cousin Michael Cheung Chi-mun back to Hong Kong with him. After arriving at the airport, Mark is ordered by a guard to open his luggage but seemingly forgot his keys, resulting in his confinement by corrupt security guards who strip and attempt to rob him, but he is saved by Chow, who seems to have some measure of influence.

Mark and Michael later encounter Kit in a nightclub where they learn of her criminal activities including gun running. Kit takes an interest in the cousins and invites them to accompany her on a deal with a local Vietnamese warlord. The deal sours but the three escape. Kit is impressed with how Mark and Michael handled themselves.

Over the next few months, Kit trains the cousins in her business and also in a marksmanship. Mark and Michael develop an attraction to her while Kit is attracted to Mark. Despite his feelings, Mark does not reciprocate Kit's affections to avoid hurting Michael, who thinks Kit is in love with him.

Kit manages to secure safe passage for Mark, Michael, and Michael's father back to Hong Kong. The three return and start a new business there.

The leader of the arms smuggling company (and Kit's former lover), Sam Ho Cheung-ching, returns after a three-year absence when he was presumed dead. Jealous of Kit's relationship with Mark and Michael, he plots to kill the cousins. Ho sends a bomb to the business, which kills Michael's father. Ho and his men capture Mark and Michael; they severely beat them with Ho warning them to stay away from Kit.

Kit expresses her regret for Michael's father's death and to share her feelings with Mark, which he reciprocates. Ho returns to Vietnam, taking Kit with him, to complete the deal with the Vietnamese warlord encountered earlier in the film.

Mark and Michael follow Ho back to Saigon, intending to kill him. Mark steps off the plane attired in his iconic outfit as seen in A Better Tomorrow: black duster, sunglasses, and matchstick in his mouth.

Kit later meets Michael in an abandoned temple to give him two plane tickets to leave Saigon with Mark. However, they are unexpectedly swarmed by Việt Cộng troops who attempt to execute them. Pat, a soldier and friend of Mark and Michael, strays into the temple which triggers a firefight with the Viet Cong. Michael is shot but is able to escape with Kit and Pat onto a jeep. During the ride however, Michael falls off and is surrounded by the Viet Cong which forces Pat and Kit to use a mortar that lands too close to Michael.

Believing Michael to be dead, Mark confronts Kit in her hotel room and accuses her of betrayal and keeping secrets from him. Their spat becomes physical with Mark hitting her and telling her he wants nothing to do with her before leaving. Later, Mark is met by Pat who takes him to an ambulance where Michael had been recovering.

Meanwhile, a despondent Kit prepares a bomb that she plans to detonate during her planned meeting with Ho and the Vietnamese warlord. During the meeting, however, the warlord attempts to double-cross Ho leading to a shoot-out. When the gun battle dies down, Mark arrives dual wielding two M-16 rifles, intending to exact revenge on Ho. Another shoot-out ensues, this time between Ho and Mark, during which Kit is shot by one of Ho's henchmen. Ho, however, is furious that Kit had become collateral and shoots his henchman. Ho prepares to execute Mark only to be shot by the warlord firing from a window. Mark catches Ho and uses his gun to shoot back at the warlord; Mark then cradles Ho who dies in his arms.

Pat and Michael arrive in the same ambulance to help Mark escape with the wounded Kit. The four are pursued by the warlord in an M48 Patton tank but Mark manages to destroy the tank with mortars, killing the warlord.

Mark and Michael then rush a dying Kit to Tan Son Nhat airport, where a mass evacuation is on-going as a result of the Fall of Saigon. Showing Kit's travel pass to the guards, the three are granted passage on the last helicopter leaving the airport which lifts off just as the North Vietnamese army rush through the tarmac and the Viet Cong flag is raised.

Kit succumbs to her injuries. Mark cradles her dead body and contemplates his life ahead as the helicopter flies off into the sunset.

== Cast ==
- Chow Yun-fat as Mark 'Gor' Lee
- Tony Leung Ka-fai as Michael Cheung Chi-mun
- Anita Mui as Chow Ying-kit
- Shih Kien as Michael's father
- Saburō Tokitō as Sam Ho Cheung-ching/Tanaka
- Maggie Cheung Ho-yee as Ling
- Cheng Wai-lun as Pat
- Andrew Kam as Jimmy
- Foo Wang-tat as Uncle Mười
- Nam Yin as Bond
- Wan Seung-lam as General with Bond
- Wong Chi-wai as Bodyguard
- Kirk Wong as Bodyguard
- Tam Wai as Bodyguard
- To Wai-wo as Soldier
- Ho Chi-moon as Mr. Ho's board member
- Thanh Hoàng
- Quyền Linh
- Leung Sam
- William Cheng

== Box office ==
The film grossed HK$18,476,116 at the Hong Kong box office.

== Alternative versions ==
The Taiwan version runs 130 minutes long, which is the complete uncut version. A VCD release of this version which incorrectly listed a length of 145 minutes has led to widespread allegations of a longer version, but the back cover of the VCD is the only evidence of the existence of a longer cut. The more widely available international version is 119 minutes (114 on PAL releases). A Taiwan Long Shong VHS dubbed in Taiwan (and distributed from Taiwan) contains an alternate scene in which Anita kisses Tony Leung's hand but is also shorter than the apocryphal 145 minute cut.

== Year-end list ==
- 10th – Stephen Hunter, The Baltimore Sun
