= Eddie Lau =

Fashion designer from Hong Kong

Eddie Lau Pui-Kei
- 劉培基
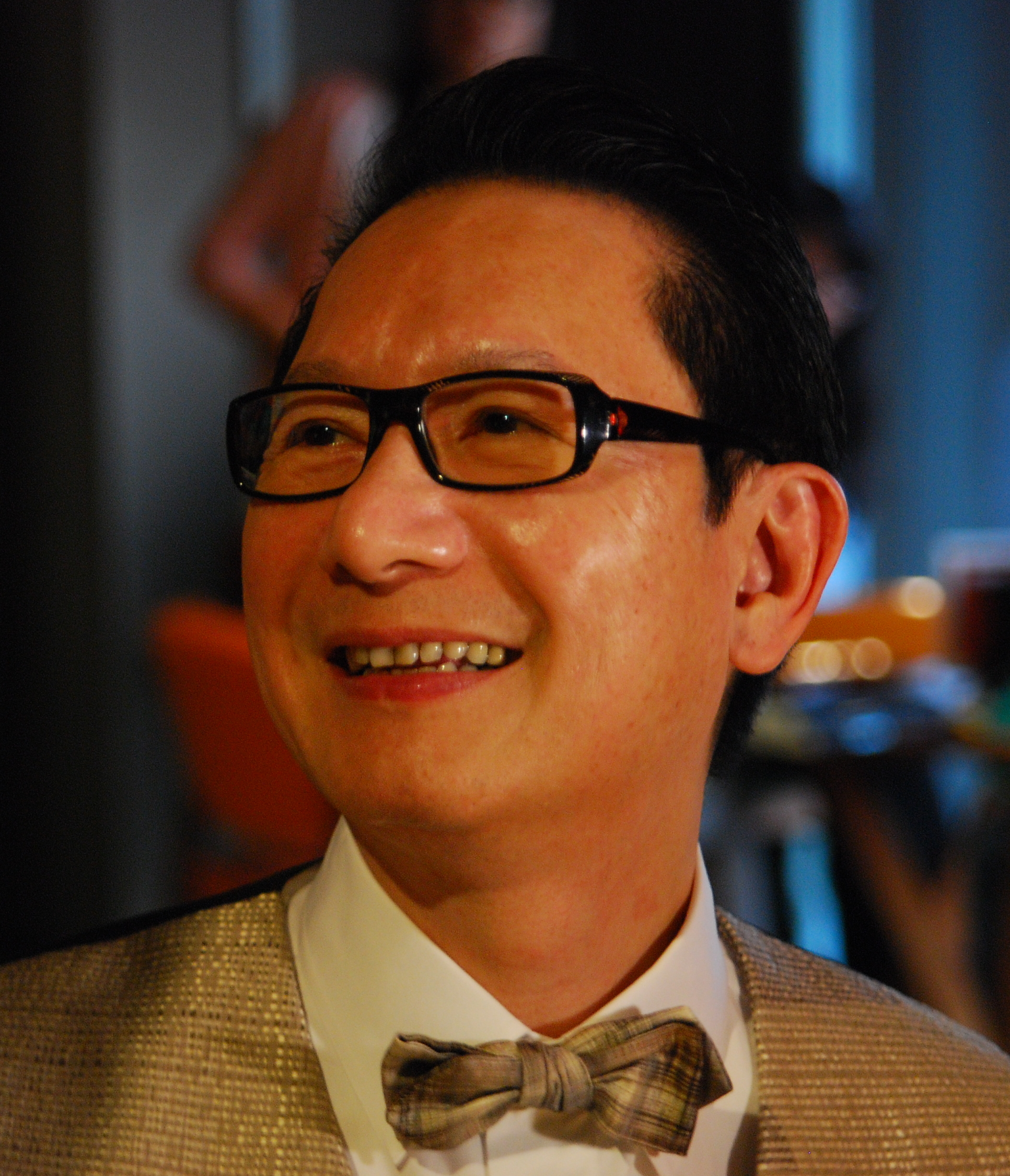
- Born: February 24, 1951 (age 75); British Hong Kong
- Education: Advanced clothing and material design in Saint Martins School of Art in London
- Occupations: Fashion Designer & Image Designer (Retired)
- Awards: Hong Kong Outstanding Young Persons Award '1983; Awards For Business Excellence '1987; Artists of The Year Awards in Fashion Design '1999; Artists of The Year Awards in Image Design '1999; MingPao Weekly's Hong Kong Dynamic Fashion Award '2013
- Website: eddielau.com

Eddie Lau Pui-Kei (born February 24, 1951) is a fashion designer in Hong Kong. Lau has worked in the fashion industry since 1962 until his retirement in 1999, but continues working in fashion. His career peaked in the 1980s, when he designed haute couture and stage costumes for celebrities including Anita Mui, Leslie Cheung, Eunice Lam, Bak Sheut-sin, Liza Wang, and Michelle Yeoh. Lau was also employed to design uniforms for international brands – Cathay Pacific (1999, 2011), Cathay Dragon (2013) and gained recognition for this work.

Lau is the first fashion designer whose works have become a focus of the Hong Kong Heritage Museum's collection In 2013, the Hong Kong Heritage Museum held an exhibition of Lau, named '他Fashion傳奇Eddie Lau‧她Image百變‧劉培基', including iconic stage costumes worn by Anita Mui, as well as Cathay Pacific cabin crew uniform. His autobiography Clair de Lune (《舉頭望明月．劉培基自傳》) was released in the same year.

== Early life and education ==
Lau was born in Hong Kong. He has never seen his father, while his mother was Pansy Cheung, an author. When he was eight years old, he was sent to a boarding school in Fanling. However, his mother did not pay any of his tuition fees. At the age of 11, Lau started out as an apprentice under a Shanghai tailor, Hai Hung-fat, in Tsim Sha Tsui. During this period, Lau learned the craftsmanship which became particularly useful throughout his career. Also, the experience gained from the apprenticeship inspired the three elements that were emphasized in his future designs – silhouette, simplicity and elegance.

In 1973, after he had saved enough money, Lau left Hong Kong for his further education on fashion design in a renowned fashion design institute – Central Saint Martins in London. According to Elle Magazine (199edition of August 1), Lau 'was enlightened by the freedom and artistic environment there and began to understand better what fashion design really was'.

== Career ==
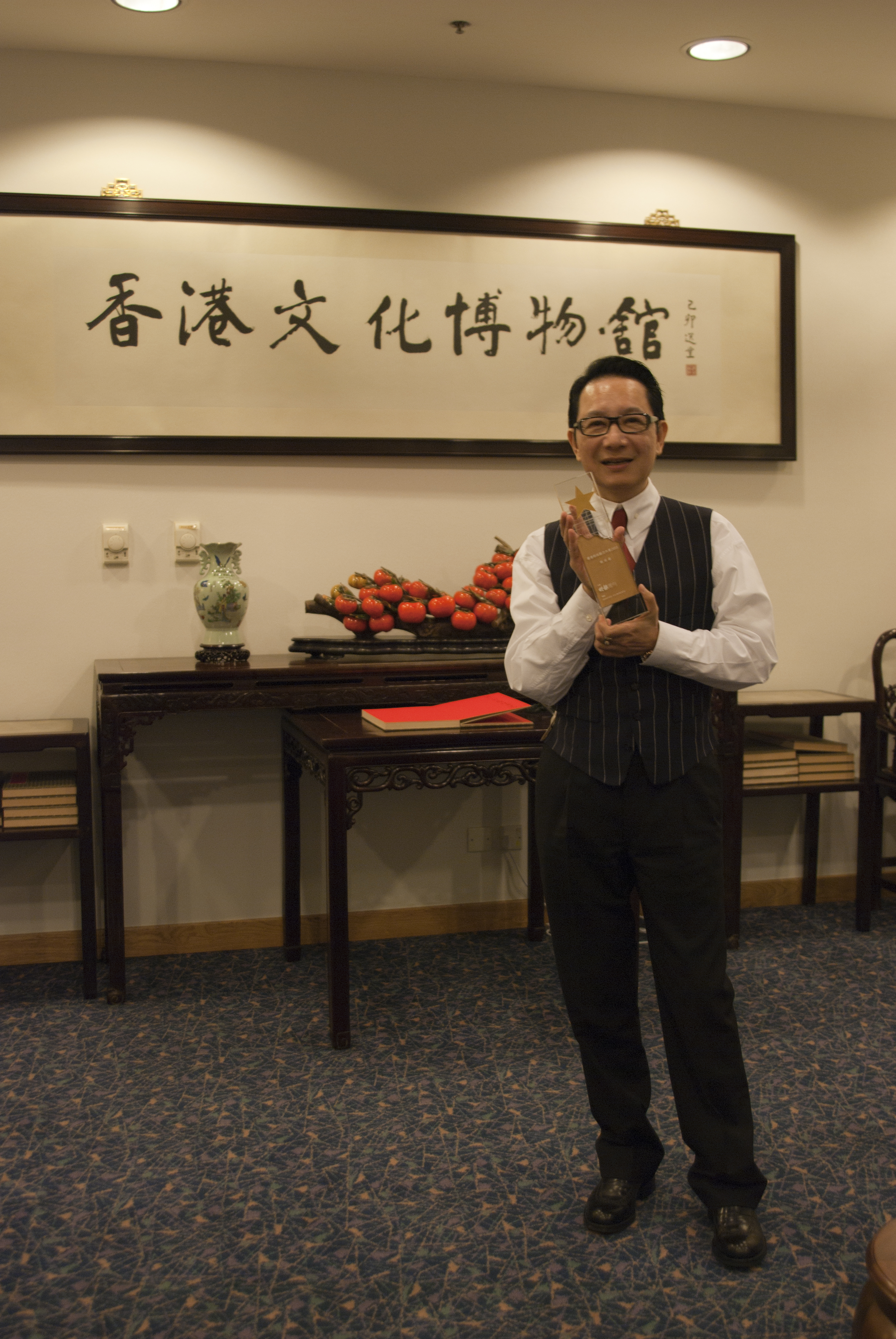
Lau was invited to hold an exhibition in the Hong Kong Heritage Museum in 2013

In fact, before Lau went to London for his further study, he established his own workshop in a rented room in Mirador Mansion at the age of 16. Since then, Lau began his personal lifelong business in the fashion industry.

After finishing his 2-year study in London, Lau returned to Hong Kong with his first collection. Soon in 1977, Lau was invited to parade his fashion collection for the grand finale in the Ready-to-wear Festival, which was organized by the Hong Kong Trade Development Council. In the same year, he headed back to London to hold his fashion show, and also flew to different countries afterwards to showcase his collections.

Later on, Lau launched his own lines:‘EDDIE LAU’and‘KAI’ (姫). He also founded his own fashion boutiques with his own brand 'EDDIE LAU' in Hong Kong and Japan, and collaborated with Chinese Arts and Crafts (H.K.) Ltd. to create several fashion collections. With these notable accomplishments, Lau became the first-ever Hong Kong designer to own an individual workshop and boutique.

In the 1980s, apart from fashion design and haute couture, Lau began his work in image design and stage costumes for pop stars, and the most iconic artist is Anita Mui, who dressed up in Lau's garments for almost every occasion and won the title of'Ever Changing Anita Mui' (百變梅艷芳).

In 1999, Lau completed a project for Cathay Pacific – designing the flight attendant uniforms. He used 'The Heart of Asia' as his inspiration, and the design received a myriad of positive responses from the public. He retired after he had finished the project.

However, after Lau's retirement, his passion towards fashion remains, and he is still keen on contributing to the industry. Lau renewed Cathay Pacific uniform designs in 2004 and designed the new uniforms for Cathay Pacific and Dragonair respectively in 2011 and 2013.

== Awards ==
- Hong Kong Outstanding Young Persons Award '1983
- Awards For Business Excellence '1987
- Artists of The Year Awards in Fashion Design '1999
- Artists of The Year Awards in Image Design '1999
- MingPao Weekly's Hong Kong Dynamic Fashion Award '2013
