= Ann Mui =

Hong Kong actress and singer

- 梅愛芳
- Mui in the 1990s
- Born: Ann Mui Oi-fong; 10 December 1959; Hepu, Guangdong, China
- Died: 16 April 2000 (aged 40); Causeway Bay, Hong Kong
- Burial place: Shang Sin Chun Tong, Kowloon Tong, Hong Kong
- Occupations: Singer; actress
- Years active: 1989–2000
- Spouse: Poon Lap-Tak (m. 1991)
- Children: 2
- Family: Anita Mui (sister)

Chinese name
- Traditional Chinese: 梅愛芳
- Simplified Chinese: 梅爱芳
Transcriptions
Yue: Cantonese
- Jyutping: Mui4 Ngoi3fong1

Ann Mui Oi-fong (梅愛芳) (10 December 1959 – 16 April 2000) was a Hong Konger singer and actress.

== Career ==
Born on 10 December 1959 in China, Mui experienced much hardship in her childhood. Her father died when she was very young and her mother, Tam Mei-kam, raised four children alone.

Like her sister Anita, Mui had a dramatic contralto singing voice, which is a rarity in Chinese pop music. Despite not being twins, both Mui and Anita's singing voices were strikingly similar, with the only way to tell them apart was the hand in which they hold the microphone. She is best remembered for her supporting roles in many movies, especially Jackie Chan's Police Story 2.

Mui died of cervical cancer in 2000, as would Anita three years later. Both sisters died at age 40. Mui died in St. Paul's Hospital, Causeway Bay, and her ashes were interred in Shang Sin Chun Tong, Kowloon Tong.

== Personal life ==
In 1991, she married the father of her two sons, Poon Lap-Tak, whom she and her family became estranged from until her death in 2000.

== Selected filmography ==
- 1988 – Police Story 2
- 1989 – Burning Ambition
- 1989 – The Iceman Cometh
- 1989 – They Came to Rob Hong Kong
- 1990 – Stagedoor Johnny
- 1990 – Chicken A La Queen
- 1991 – Touch and Go
- 1995 – Farewell My Dearest
