= Daughter of Hong Kong =

Daughter of Hong Kong (Chinese: 香港女兒 or 香港的女兒) is a nickname. People with the nickname include:

- Anita Mui (1963–2003), an awarded actress and Cantopop diva dubbed as "Madonna of the East".
- Joanna Tse (1968–2003), a pulmonologist who died on duty while volunteering to save patients during the 2003 SARS pandemic.
- Chow Hang-tung (born 1985), a barrister, democratic activist and political prisoner.
- Yau Wai-ching (born 1991), former elected Legislative Council member, and a member of the localist camp Youngspiration.

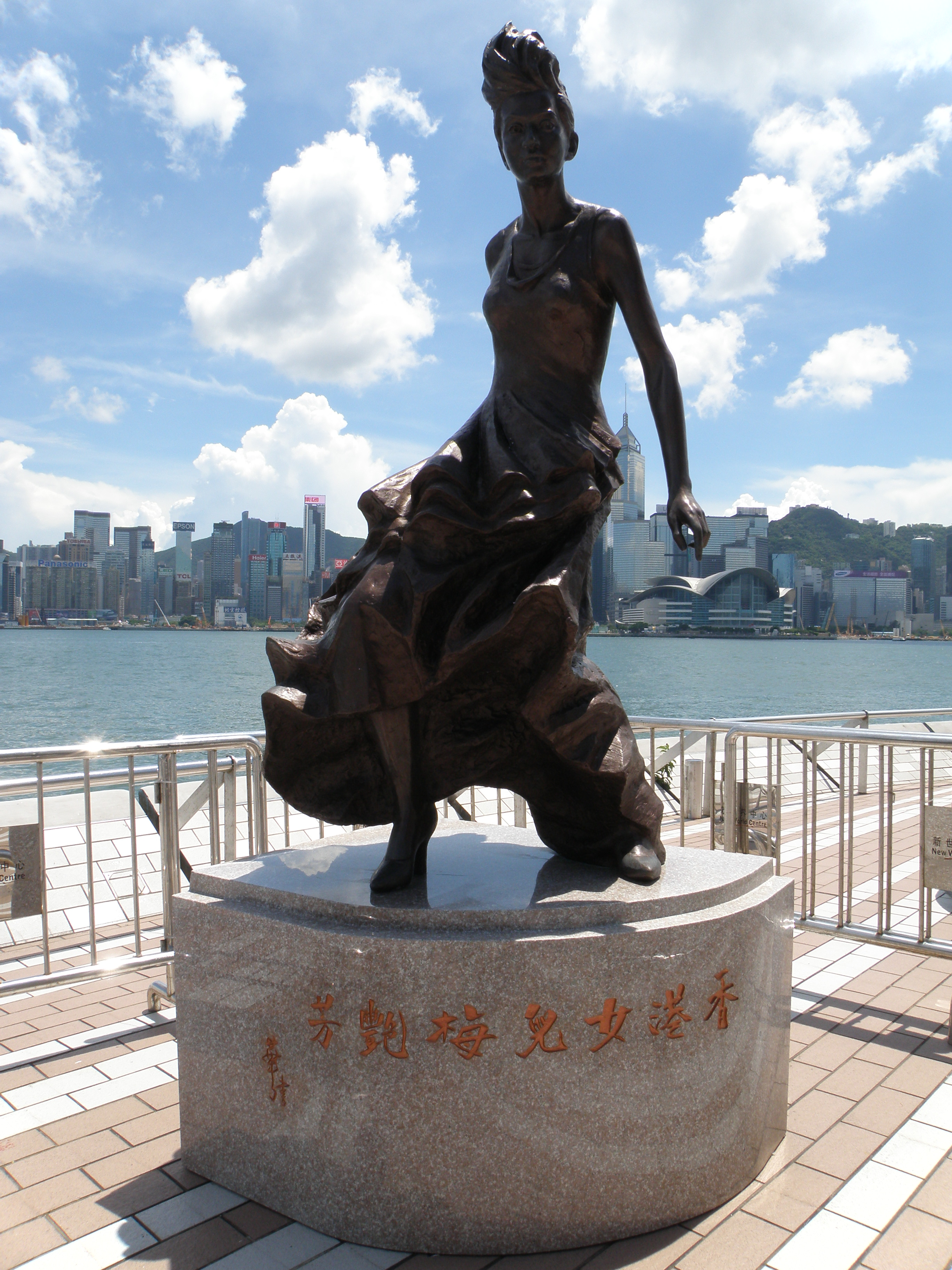
A statute of Anita Mui at the Avenue of Stars. The inscription below reads "Daughter of Hong Kong, Anita Mui"
