= China Education Television =

Chinese television network

China Education Television 中国教育电视台

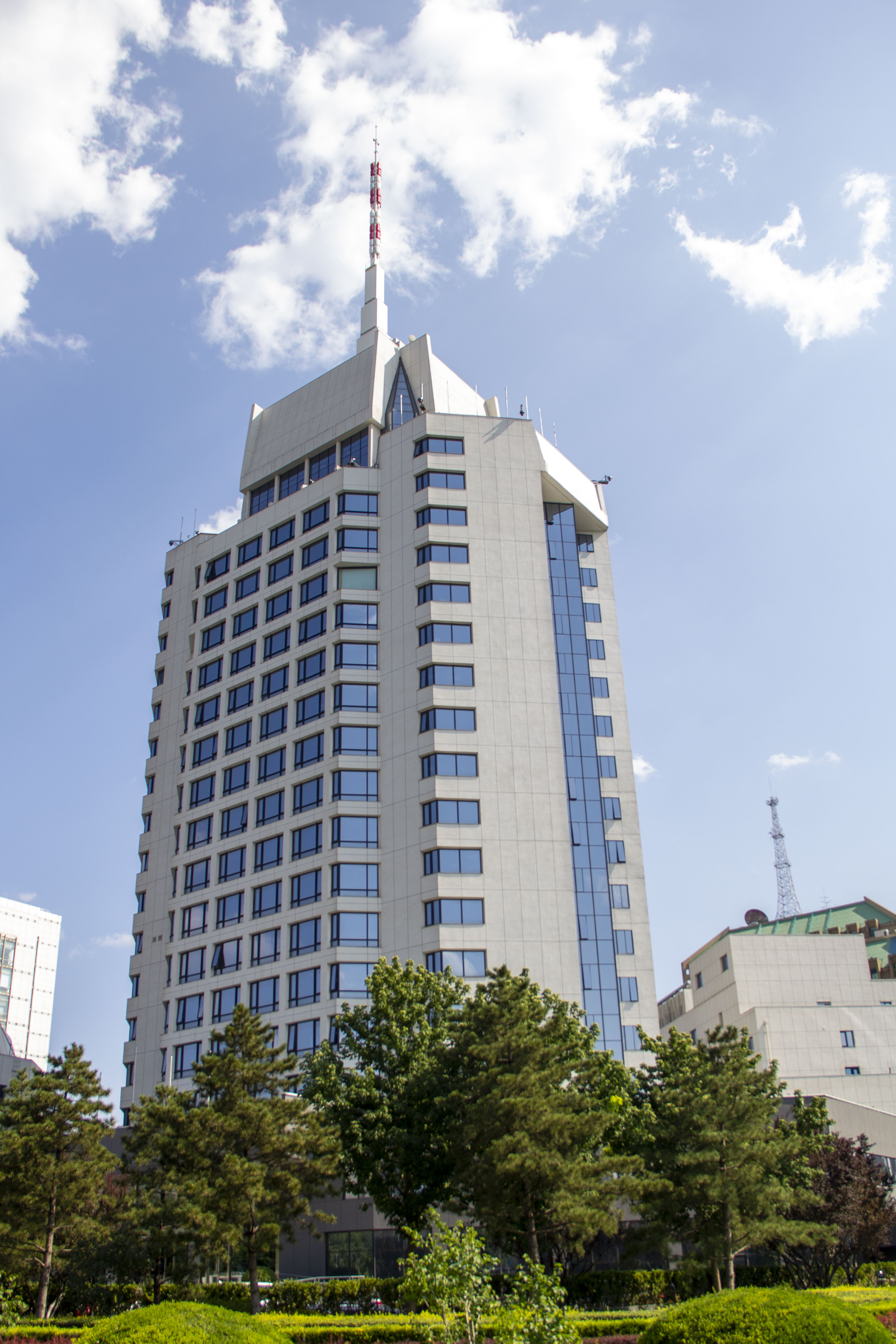
- China Education Television headquarters in Beijing.
- Company type: Television network and Cable television
- Industry: Television Broadcasting
- Founded: October 1, 1986
- Headquarters: Beijing, China
- Key people: Lu Xiaoping, President
- Products: Television content, Television programming
- Parent: Administrative parent: Ministry of Education of the People's Republic of China; Service Management: State Administration of Press, Publication, Radio, Film and Television
- Website: www.centv.cn

China Education Television (CETV; Chinese: 中国教育电视台) is an educational TV station in China. Its first broadcast was on October 1, 1986. It provides mainly educational programs, similar to BBC Two in the United Kingdom or NHK Educational TV in Japan.

== Free channels ==
=== CETV-1 ===
CETV-1 has been broadcasting since 1986. It was first conceived as a comprehensive education channel focusing on Chinese education and human resource development.

It is the only satellite channel with the same policy support as CCTV-1, the only satellite channel covering more than 2,000 colleges and universities, and 400,000 primary and secondary schools through ChinaSat 9, ChinaSat 6B and Apstar 6 transmission.

Over 92% of users have been using cable TV and about 971 million people are covered. CETV mainly publicizes the Chinese Communist Party's national education policies in the form of educational culture programs, public service programs, and campus fashion programs.

=== CETV-2 ===
CETV-2 covers satellite TV channels, as well as in Southeast Asia, and mainly broadcasts continuing education courses of China Central Radio & TV University, in order to facilitate Adult and Vocational Education. The courses cover literature, law, finance, economics, science, engineering, agriculture, and medicine.

=== CETV-3 ===
CETV-3 is a humanistic education channel broadcast in Beijing and is China's pioneer documentary channel. Its audience rating ranks top 20 among more than 70 Beijing channels. Its focus is on Humanity, Science and Technology, and Educational programs.

=== CETV-4 ===
CETV-4 is a welfare satellite channel covering the nation, is focused on primary and secondary schools, teachers and parents, and provides documentaries. Air Class Channel played an important role in the resumption of school classes after events such as the SARS outbreak, Sichuan earthquake and Yushu earthquake. On December 11, 2008, the State Administration of Radio Film and Television gave an official reply to approve the Air Class by CETV. The Air Class Channel was revised on January 1, 2012, by combining documentaries and textbooks.

== Paid channel ==
=== Early Education ===
The Early Education Channel started broadcasting in 2005 and is the only national channel for early childhood education. Mainly for kids up to 12 years old, it also covers prenatal education for mothers. The channel offers programming across more than 150 cities in China, through China's first digital TV transmission platform and digital paid channels.

== Internet television ==
China Education Network Television uses broadband Internet, mobile communication networks and other emerging technologies to promote the delivery of cultural and educational messages, guide online public opinion and deliver to citizens, especially the young, a rich cultural life. It is the only national education online channel, and provides users with content aggregation, live, on demand, upload, share, learning and trade capabilities. It is also the only international channel available to foreigners to learn Chinese language and culture.

== History ==
The network was founded on October 1, 1986.

On June 24, 2015, the station changed its logo.
