= Green Mountain Orchestra =

Musical group from Hong Kong

Green Mountain Orchestra (GMO, TC: 青山大樂隊) is a band / music group from Hong Kong that is formed by 4 music writers, performers, and producers. Members include:

- Carl Wong (王雙駿),
- Veronica Lee(李端嫻),
- Ying C Foo (英師傅), and
- Harris Ho (何秉舜) - the older brother of singer and actress Denise Ho.

== Productions ==
=== For HOCC ===
- The Best of HOCC
- Glamorous
- Butterfly Lovers
- OUR TIME HAS COME (Album)
- We Stand As One
- HOCC Live In Unity 2006 Concert
- What Really Matters

== Performances ==
=== For HOCC ===
- Butterfly Lovers Musical
- Hocc Live in Unity

== See also ==
- Denise Ho
- Goomusic
