= GMO (disambiguation) =

GMO is a genetically modified organism.

GMO may also refer to:

- Genetically modified food
- Gell-Mann–Okubo mass formula in particle physics
- Generalised molecular orbital theory, in chemistry
- Gulf, Mobile and Ohio Railroad, a U.S. railroad carrier corporation
- GMO LLC, a Boston-based asset management firm led by Jeremy Grantham
- GMO Internet, Inc, a Japanese internet services company, and parent of web security company GlobalSign
- GMO (Multiópticas Internacional), a retail banner operating in Chile, Colombia, Ecuador and Peru owned by Italian eyewear corporation Luxottica.
- NSCB Gomoh Junction railway station (station code: GMO), Jharkhand, India

== Music ==
- The Glenn Miller Orchestra, a U.S. jazz group
- Green Mountain Orchestra, a band from Hong Kong
- "G.M.O. (Got My Own)", 2018 song by Mýa
