= Heroes (HOCC album) =

Studio album by Denise Ho
- Released: October 8, 2009
- Genre: Pop
- Label: East Asia Music

Denise Ho chronology
| Ten Days in the Madhouse (2008) | Heroes (2009) | Unnamed.Poem (2010) |

Heroes is an album by Denise Ho, released on October 8, 2009. On the day of its release, she also began her Supergoo concerts at the Hong Kong Coliseum. All of the album's songs were composed by Hanjin Tan and Ho's older brother Harris Ho, with lyrics written by Wyman Wong.

== Track listing ==
1. Instrumental 1
2. 舊約 ("The Old Testament")
3. 飛簷 ("The Flying Eave")
4. 惹火 ("Hot")
5. 狂草 ("Infurious Grass")
6. Instrumental 2
7. 冰心 ("Icy Heart")
8. 面書 ("Facebook")
9. 可可 ("Cocoa")
10. 妮歌(“Nicole", a song for Anita Mui)
11. Instrumental 3
12. 金剛經 ("The Diamond Sutra")
13. 舊約 (青山變奏)(The Old Testament [Green Mountain Orchestra Mix])

=== MV DVD ===
Included with the album.

- 舊約 ("The Old Testament") music video
- 金剛經music video

== Notes ==
- 3 COLORS (Red, White, Black) are available.
- Limited First Press version comes in a special-design disc case shaped like the SuperGoo logo, which houses the extra gifts like a mini poster, stickers, and "The Diamond Sutra" flip book.
