= Butterfly Lovers (disambiguation) =

Butterfly Lovers is a Chinese legend of a tragic love story of a pair of lovers.

Butterfly Lovers may also refer to:

- Sam Pek Eng Tay (English: "The Butterfly Lovers"), a 1931 Dutch East Indies film
- The Butterfly Lovers (2008 film), a Hong Kong film by Jingle Ma
- Butterfly Lovers (2007 TV series), a Chinese television series
- Butterfly Lovers (album), a 2005 album by Denise Ho
- Butterfly Lovers' Violin Concerto
- The Butterfly Lovers (album), a 2013 album by Hubert Wu

== See also ==
- Liangzhu (disambiguation)
