= Liangzhu =

Liangzhu or Liang Zhu may refer to:

Written as 良渚

- Liangzhu, the modern-day subdistrict under Yuhang district of Hangzhou, China
- Liangzhu City, an ancient city assumed to be the political and spiritual centre of Liangzhu culture
- Liangzhu culture, Neolithic culture in the Yangtze River Delta of China

Written as 梁祝

- Butterfly Lovers or Liangzhu, a Chinese legend of a tragic love story of a pair of lovers
- The Lovers (1994 film) or Liángzhù, a Hong Kong film by Tsui Hark
- Butterfly Lovers (album), a 2005 album by Denise Ho
- Liangzhu, Henan, town in Runan County, Henan, China

== See also ==
- Butterfly Lovers (disambiguation)
- Liangzhu Culture Museum
