= Glamorous (album) =

Studio album by Denise Ho
- Released: 5 January 2005
- Genre: Cantopop
- Label: East Asia Music

Denise Ho chronology
| The Best of HOCC (Compilations) | Glamorous | Butterfly Lovers |

Glamorous (TC: 艷光四射, SC: 艳光四射) is a Cantopop album by Denise Ho which pays tribute to recording artists of the 80's, including Anita Mui, Leslie Cheung, Danny Chan, Sam Hui, etc. It was her first CD released by East Asia Music.

== Track listing ==
1. 序幕 (Opening)
2. 艷光四射 (Glamorous)
3. 如無意外 (What If There's No Accident)
4. 明星夢 (Dream of Being a Superstar)
5. 你是八十年代 (You are the 80s)
6. 花迷戀 (Flower Love)
7. 明目張膽 (Brazenly)
8. 失戀日記 (Diary of Lost Love)
9. 艷光四射 (美艷到不行) (Glamorous (Cannot be More Glamorous))
10. 謝幕 (Closing)
11. 玻璃蒼蠅 (Mandarin) (Glass Fly)
12. 降落之前 (Mandarin) (Before Landing)
