= Basic Pictures =

Hong Kong production company

Basic Pictures Ltd.
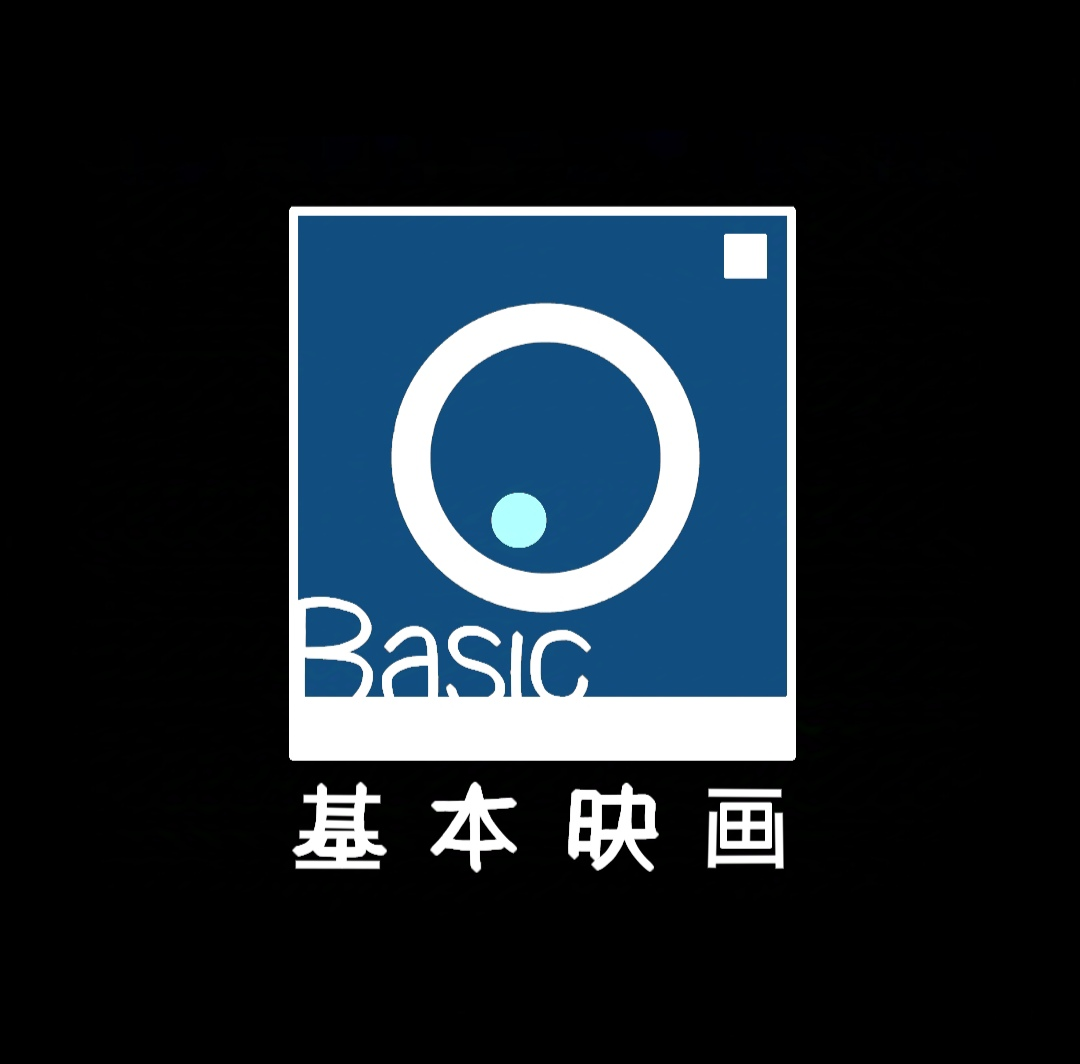
- Company type: Production company
- Industry: Film production
- Founded: 2002
- Headquarters: Kwun Tong, Hong Kong
- Key people: Andrew Lau
- Products: Film

Basic Pictures Ltd. (Chinese: 基本映画) is a Hong Kong production company that was established in 2002 by filmmaker Andrew Lau. Since its establishment, the company has gone to produce film that include the Infernal Affairs trilogy and other films in which Lau serves as either the director or the producer.

== Filmography ==
Year	Film	Chinese title	Director	Other notes
2002	Infernal Affairs	無間道	Andrew Lau, Alan Mak	
2003	Cat and Mouse	老鼠爱上猫	Gordon Chan	
2003	Infernal Affairs II	無間道II	Andrew Lau, Alan Mak	
2003	Infernal Affairs III	無間道III: 終極無間	Andrew Lau, Alan Mak	
2005	Initial D	頭文字D	Andrew Lau, Alan Mak	
2005	Moonlight in Tokyo	情義我心知	Alan Mak, Felix Chong	
2006	Daisy	데이지	Andrew Lau	Korean film
2006	Confession of Pain	傷城	Andrew Lau, Alan Mak	
2007	A Mob Story	人在江湖	Herman Yau	
2007	Undercover	危險人物	Billy Chung	
2007	The Haunted School	校墓處	Cash Chin	
2009	Look for a Star	游龍戲鳳	Andrew Lau	
2010	Legend of the Fist: The Return of Chen Zhen	精武風雲－陳真	Andrew Lau	
2011	A Beautiful Life	不再讓你孤單	Andrew Lau	
