= Ten Days in the Madhouse =

Studio album by Denise Ho
- Released: December 12, 2008
- Genre: Pop
- Length: 44:07
- Label: East Asia Music

Denise Ho chronology
Goomusic Collection 2004-2008 (2008)	Ten Days in the Madhouse (2008)	Heroes (2009)

Ten Days in the Madhouse is an album by Denise Ho, released on December 12, 2008. It focuses on a kinder perspective of society's outcasts, which includes recovering mental patients. Every song title in this album have a running theme of 4-character, taken from famous names of real celebrities and fictitious characters. The album was released in conjunction with Ho's documentary DVD titled "The Decameron" (十日談).

== Development and inspiration ==
During the promotion of her third greatest hits album, "Goomusic Collection 2004-2008", Ho mentioned that she wanted to embrace social messages in her future work rather than telling her own stories. Since then, she started doing a lot of research with her long-time collaborator Yan Yan Mak who has previously worked with Ho and produced highly acclaimed music videos of Ho's. Ho became interested in the problem of lack of awareness towards the mentally disabled in Hong Kong and decided to embrace this in her then-upcoming album and the documentary "The Decameron".

Since the project involved the topic "mental disability" or what Hong Kong people would simply describe as craziness, she recruited the composer Hanjin Tan, who is well known for his non-commercial style music, and her elder brother Harris Ho, who is a formally trained musician, to be responsible for the composition and song-production of all the songs on the album.

== Singles ==
The album spawned three singles. Ho's prefer to release songs with more positive messages rather than the rest which question about different social phenomenon in Hong Kong.

Thelma from the Castle Peak is the first single released to radio. This song describes the main character of the album, Thelma, who is a patient in the oldest psychiatric hospital of Hong Kong, Castle Peak Hospital. Ho sings about how bad she wants to be like Thelma, whose way of thinking is much simpler and innocent compared to all the "normal" people in the rest of the world. This song shows that Ho is capable of reaching very high note, which was thought to be a difficult task for Ho to achieve due her low voice. It also showcases her improved interpretation towards a song. The cracked voice at the very end of the song was a new attempt for Ho.

Misora Hibari, the second single, is a tribute to the child living in Sham Shui Po District, one of the impoverished areas of Hong Kong. The song's title literally means "birds under the beautiful sky". The birds are the metaphor to those children, who possess hindered talent and innocent hearts

Charlie and Cherrie was sent to radio as the third single. This song is a praise to a couple Ho met during her research session. The couple have been recovering from mental illness. They met and fell in love with each other when one day Charlie saw Cherrie being raped by some street stalker and saved her from the incident. Their love was described as zero selfishness by Ho.

== Track listing ==
1. 青山黛瑪 (Thelma from the Castle Peak) - 3:55
2. 安妮寶貝 (Baby Annie) - 3:30
3. 楊子經書 (Book of Yangzi) - 3:05
4. 丹賴斯隊 (Dan Rice) - 3:09
5. 查理淑儀 (Charlie and Cherrie) - 3:51
6. 堂吉訶德 (Don Quixote) - 3:26
7. 少年維特 (Young Werther) - 3:33
8. 愛德蒙多 (Edmundo) - 3:30
9. 風見志郎 (Kazami Shiro) - 3:40
10. 美空雲雀 (Misora Hibari) - 12:28

=== DVD ===
Included with the album.

- 青山黛瑪 music video
- 少年維特 music video
- 美空雲雀 music video
- Ten Days in the Madhouse" - Making-of

== Notes ==
- Also contains a "3D goo card", illustrated booklet and poster.
- The album won "Singer Songwriter Album Award" at Metro Radio Hit Music Awards 2008.
