= Look for a Star =

2009 Hong Kong film by Andrew Lau

- Theatrical release poster
- Traditional Chinese: 游龍戲鳳
- Simplified Chinese: 游龙戏凤
- Directed by: Andrew Lau
- Screenplay by: James Yuen; Cindy Tang
- Produced by: Andrew Lau
- Starring: Andy Lau; Shu Qi; Zhang Hanyu; Denise Ho
- Cinematography: Andrew Lau; Ng Man-ching
- Edited by: Azrael Chung
- Music by: Chan Kwong-wing
- Production companies: Media Asia Films; Basic Pictures; Huayi Brothers
- Distributed by: Media Asia Distribution
- Release date: 26 January 2009
- Running time: 120 minutes
- Country: Hong Kong
- Languages: Cantonese; Mandarin
- Budget: HK$45 million (~US$5.8 million)
- Box office: US$17.4 million

Look for a Star (traditional Chinese: 游龍戲鳳; simplified Chinese: 游龙戏凤; pinyin: Yóu lóng xī fèng; Cantonese Yale: Jau4 lung4 hei3 fung6) is a 2009 Hong Kong romantic comedy film that was produced and directed by Andrew Lau. Inspired by the relationship between Stanley Ho and his fourth wife, Angela Leong, the film stars Andy Lau as a billionaire, who falls in love with a feisty casino dealer played by Shu Qi. Look for a Star was shot at the MGM Grand in Macau, and was released in Hong Kong on 26 January 2009.

== Plot ==
It is love at first sight when Sam chances upon a feisty, fast-talking woman with the odd name of Milan at a Macau casino. But the catch is, she is a part-time baccarat dealer and a full-time cabaret dancer, "careers" not exactly congruent with his station in life. Falling in love against all odds, this mismatched couple soon makes headline in all media turning Milan into an It girl overnight.

== Cast ==
- Andy Lau as Sam Ching
- Shu Qi as Milan Sit
- Zhang Hanyu as Lin Jiu
- Denise Ho as Jo Kwok
- Lam Ka-wah as Tim Ma
- Zhang Xinyi as Shannon Fok
- David Chiang as Uncle
- George Lam as "Sharky"
- Rebecca Pan as Sam's Mother
- Maria Cordero as Auntie
- Cheung Tat-ming as Tommy
- Raymond Cho as Frank
- Monie Tung as Kamy
- Angelina Lo as Sister Siu
- Ella Koon as Chihuahua
- Po Lok-tung as Yumi
- Pei Weiying as Fanny
- Yao Wenxue as Sawara
- Terence Yin as Joseph
- Tony Ho as Hotel Manager
- Pinky Cheung as Socialite At Party
- Kristal Tin as Socialite At Party
- Belinda Hamnett as Socialite At Party
- Han Yuqin
- Pauline Yeung as Pauline
- Prudence Kao
- Lee Kin-hing as Sam's Minority Shareholder

== Production ==
Look for a Star is a Hong Kong and Chinese co-production that marks the sixth collaboration between producer, director, and cinematographer Andrew Lau and Cantopop singer and actor Andy Lau. It is also the second film collaboration between Andy Lau and actress Shu Qi. Both actors and the director worked together on the 2002 science fiction action film, The Wesley's Mysterious File, although Andy Lau had expressed wanting to make a romantic comedy with Shu.

Look for a Star was distributed by Media Asia Entertainment Group in Hong Kong and produced by Media Asia, Chinese film studio Huayi Brothers, and Andrew Lau's production company, Basic Pictures. Shot under a budget of HK$45 million, the film is reportedly based on the relationship between casino tycoon Stanley Ho and his fourth wife, Angela Leong.

=== Filming ===
Look for a Star was supported by the Macau Government Tourist Office, and shot at the MGM Grand Macau, best known for its spectacular Grande Praca swimming pool and deluxe villa suites. Other filming locations included Macau's Southern European architecture, including the Old Ladies House, the Guia Lighthouse and the Coloane village.

== Accolades ==
Accolades
Ceremony	Category	Recipient	Outcome
29th Hong Kong Film Awards	Best Actress	Shu Qi	Nominated
29th Hong Kong Film Awards	Best Supporting Actress	Denise Ho	Nominated
