= HOCC Live in Unity 2006 =

HOCC Live in Unity 2006 Concert (2CD + Bonus DVD)

Live album by Denise Ho
- Released: 2 February 2007
- Label: EastAsia

Denise Ho chronology
We Stand As One (Single)	HOCC Live in Unity 2006 Concert (2CD + Bonus DVD)

HOCC Live in Unity 2006 Concert (2CD + Bonus DVD) is a set of two CDs and one DVD which consists of most songs Denise Ho performed in her Live in Unity 2006 Concert.
