= The Best of HOCC =

Greatest hits album by Denise Ho
- Released: November 20, 2004
- Genre: Cantopop
- Label: EMI

Denise Ho chronology
Dress Me Up! (2003)	The Best of HOCC (2004)	Glamorous (2005)

The Best of HOCC is a Cantopop album by Denise Ho, released by EMI on November 20, 2004.

== Track listing ==
1. 畸后 (Insane Queen)
2. Happy Ending
3. 一秒 - 何韻詩/方力申/Mini (One Second) (Featuring HOCC, Alex Fong, Mini)
4. 迷你與我 (Mini and Me)
5. 水花四濺 (Water Splashing)
6. 天使藍 (Angel Blue)
7. 勁愛你 - 何韻詩/Shine (Love you Heaps) (Featuring HOCC, Shine)
8. Shampoo
9. Ecoutez-moi
10. 再見...露絲瑪莉 (Goodbye...Rosemary)
11. 我會選擇C (I would pick "C")
12. 兄弟 (Brother)
13. 我找到了 (I found it)
14. 絕對 (Absolute)
15. 娃鬼回魂 (Ghost of a Ghost)
16. 元神出竅 (Soul Out)
17. 沙 (恆河協奏曲) Sand) (Universal Performance Piece)
