= Music Is Live =

Music is Live Andy Hui X Denise Ho Music is Live - CD

Live album by Denise Ho
- Released: June 30, 2003 (CD); August 28, 2003 (VCD/DVD)

Denise Ho chronology
Roundup	Music is Live Andy Hui X Denise Ho Music is Live - CD	Dress Me Up!

Music is Live Andy Hui X Denise Ho Music is Live (TC: 許志安 X 何韻詩 2人交叉組合拉闊 03) is a live album that was recorded at Andy Hui and Denise Ho's "Music is Live" concert held by 903 id Club in 2003.

== Track listing ==
=== Disc 1 ===
1. Medley: (Andy Hui, Denise Ho)
  1. 再見露絲瑪莉
  2. 迷你與我
  3. 我沒有事
  4. 兄弟
2. 燕尾蝶 - Dovetail Butterfly (Denise Ho)
3. 青蛙王子 - Frog Prince (Denise Ho)
4. 天使藍 - Angelic Blue (Denise Ho)
5. 愛妳 - Love You (Denise Ho, not in VCD/DVD version)
6. 七友 - Seven Friends (Denise Ho)
7. 三角誌 - Love Triangle (Denise Ho)
8. 灰飛煙滅 - Huifei Yanmie (Andy Hui)
9. 大男人 (許志安, not in CD version) - Chauvinistic Man (Andy Hui)
10. Medley: (Andy Hui)
  1. 有了你
  2. 有病呻吟
  3. 身體健康
  4. 為妳鍾情
11. Play It Loud (Andy Hui)

=== Disc 2 ===
1. Medley: (Andy Hui, Denise Ho)
  1. 將冰山劈開
  2. 妖女
  3. 壞女孩
  4. 夢伴
  5. 冰山大火
2. 女人之苦 - Women's Suffering (Andy Hui, Denise Ho)
3. 有得做 - Things to Do (Denise Ho)
4. 絕對 - Absolute (Denise Ho)
5. 我找到了 - I Have Found It (Denise Ho)
6. 再見露絲瑪莉 - Goodbye... Rosemary (Denise Ho)
7. 讓愛 - Let Love Be (Andy Hui)
8. 活在當下 - Living In The Now (Andy Hui)
9. 天下之大 - Size Of The World (Andy Hui)
10. 501 (Andy Hui)
11. 我的天我的歌 - My Day, My Song (Andy Hui)
12. 半天假 - Half Day Off (Andy Hui, Denise Ho)
13. 爛泥 - Mud (Andy Hui, Denise Ho)
