= Our Time Has Come =

Studio album by Denise Ho
- Released: Version 1: May 19, 2006; Version 2: July 19, 2006
- Genre: Pop
- Length: 37:22
- Label: East Asia Music

Denise Ho chronology
Butterfly Lovers (2005)	Our Time Has Come (2006)	HOCC - The Greatest Hits (2006)

Our Time Has Come is an album by Denise Ho, initially released on May 19, 2006, and later re-released on July 19, 2006. Denise's Ho's brother, Harris Ho, was the album's music producer.

The 2005 American gay romance film Brokeback Mountain was the creative spark for the album's song "I Wish I Knew How to Quit You". Wyman Wong wrote the lyrics for the song. Another song in the album, "Her Story", is about women's independence. At the beginning, the song's main character lives without a sense of self in being focused on catering to men. She then "decides to seek out new horizons" and begins to find her identity.

== Track listing ==
1. 花見 (Hanabi) - 3:55
2. 願我可以學會放低你 (I Wish I Knew How to Quit You) - 4:23
3. 我們的 (Ours) (Interlude) - 2:15
4. 滿城盡帶黃金甲 (Fully Belted Gold Armor) - 3:08
5. Her Story - 3:37
6. 夜半敲門 (Knocking the Door at Midnight) - 4:42
7. 學會了 (Learned) (Reprise) - 1:58
8. 圓滿 (Complete) - 4:18
9. 忘了你是你 (To Forget You are You) (Mandarin) - 4:24
10. 夜半開門 (Opening the Door at Midnight) (Mandarin) - 4:42

=== DVD ===
Included with version 1 only:

1. 花見七九八 (Seeing Flowers Seven Nine Eight) (Music Movie) - 33 minutes
2. Music Movie 製作特輯 (Making Of) - 11 minutes

Included with version 2 only:

1. Opening (NCM Live)
2. 滿城盡帶黃金甲 (Fully Belted Gold Armor) (NCM Live)
3. 你是八十年代 (You are the 80's) (NCM Live)
4. Her Story (NCM Live)
5. 沙 (Sand) (NCM Live)
6. 願我可以學會放低你 (I Wish I Knew How to Quit You) (NCM Live)
7. 花見 (Hanabi) (NCM Live)
8. 艷光四射 (Glamorous) (NCM Live)
9. 花迷戀 (Flower Love) (NCM Live)
10. 夜半敲門 (Knocking the Door at Midnight) (NCM Live)
11. 圓滿 (Complete) (NCM Live)
12. 花見 (Hanabi) (Music Video)
13. 願我可以學會放低你 (I Wish I Knew How to Quit You) (Music Video)
14. 夜半敲門 (Knocking the Door at Midnight) (Music Video)
15. 圓滿 (Complete) (Music Video)
