= Butterfly Lovers (album) =

Studio album by Denise Ho
- Released: Version 1: September 7, 2005; Version 2: November 15, 2005; Version 3: December 2, 2005
- Genre: Pop
- Length: 52:50 (Version 2 & 3)
- Label: East Asia Music

Denise Ho chronology
Glamorous (2005)	Butterfly Lovers (2005)	Our Time Has Come (2006)

Butterfly Lovers (simplified Chinese: 梁祝下世传奇; traditional Chinese: 梁祝下世傳奇) is an album, by Denise Ho, initially released on September 7, 2005. It is the companion album to Ho's musical stageplay, Butterfly Lovers, starring Endy Chow and herself.

== Track listing ==
1. 蛹 (Cocoon) - 1:41
2. 化蝶 (Becoming A Butterfly) (Live Piano Version) - 4:14
3. 橋上 (On The Bridge) - 0:39
4. 不是吟詩的時候 (Not the Time to Recite Poems) - 4:20
5. 長不大 (Not Growing) - 3:33
6. 汽水樽裡的咖啡 (Coffee In A Soda Bottle) - 5:13
7. 血肉之驅 (Flesh and Blood) - 1:02
8. 十八相送 (Eighteen Send Off) - 4:10
9. 勞斯．萊斯 (Lucy Lois) - 4:30
10. 撲蝶 (Catching Butterfly) - 0:41
11. 有人跟蹤我 (Someone Is Stalking Me) - 2:50
12. 做好準備 (Be Prepared) - 3:55
13. 禁色 (Forbidden Color) - 4:01 (Not in version 1)
14. 小淇 (Qi) - 1:49
15. 樓台會 (Meeting at the Tower) - 2:42
16. 萊斯．勞斯 (Lois Lucy) - 1:16
17. 化蝶 (Becoming A Butterfly) - 4:50
18. 蝴蝶結 (Butterfly Knot) - 1:21

=== VCD ===
Included with version 1 only.

1. 化蝶 (Becoming A Butterfly) music video
2. 勞斯．萊斯 (Lucy Lois) music video

=== DVD ===
Included with versions 2 and 3 only.

- DVD running time: 75 Minutes
- Denise Ho and the music video director - Heart to Heart Talk
- 化蝶 (Becoming A Butterfly) music video
- 禁色 (Forbidden Color) music video, featuring Anthony Wong
- 勞斯‧萊斯 (Lucy Lois) music video (Unseen scenes)
- 汽水樽裡的咖啡 (Coffee In A Soda Bottle) music video (Director's Cut)

== Notes ==
- Version 1 contains two sheets of stickers and one 15 inch by 20 inch poster.
- Version 1 does not contain the song 禁色 (Forbidden Color), it is only available on versions 2 and 3 only.
- Version 1 of the song, 小淇 (Young Qi), only contains music, while versions 2 and 3 contain music and lyrics.
- Version 3 is the same as version 2, except the 48 page photo album is not included.
