= Denise Ho =

Canadian musical artist (born 1977)

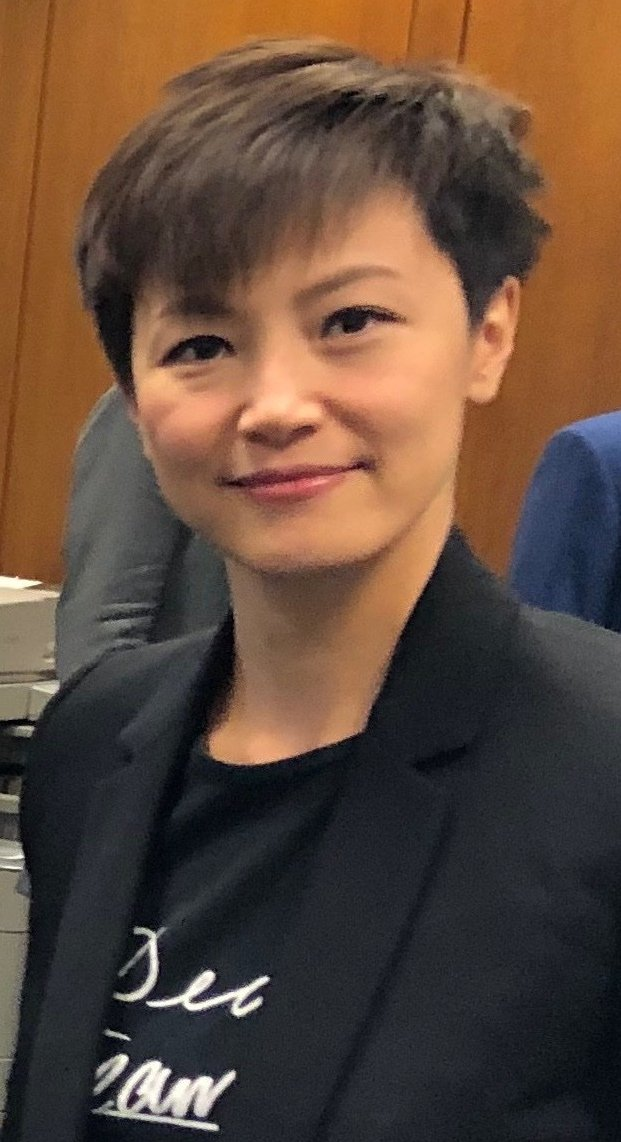
- Ho at the U.S. Capitol in 2019

Background information
- Also known as: HOCC
- Born: Ho Wan-see 何韻詩; 10 May 1977 (age 49); British Hong Kong
- Origin: Hong Kong
- Genres: Cantopop; Mandopop; alternative rock; symphonic rock; synthpop; soul; electronic rock
- Occupations: Singer; actress
- Instruments: Vocals; guitar
- Years active: 1996–present
- Labels: Goomusic (2015–present); East Asia Music (2004–2015); EMI (2002–2004); Capital Artists (1996–2001)

Chinese name
- Traditional Chinese: 何韻詩
- Simplified Chinese: 何韵诗
Transcriptions
Standard Mandarin
- Hanyu Pinyin: Hé Yùnshī
Yue: Cantonese
- Jyutping: ho4 wan5 si1

Denise Ho Wan-see (born 10 May 1977) is a Hong Kong and Canadian singer and actress. In 2014, Ho was blacklisted by the Chinese government following her support for pro-democracy movements in Hong Kong. As of 2024, her passport has been confiscated by the government and there have been no updates since then as to whether she is permitted to leave Hong Kong.

== Early life and education ==
Ho was born in Hong Kong. Both of her parents were teachers. She began her primary school education at the Diocesan Girls' Junior School. In 1988, she moved with her parents to Montreal, Canada. Ho first attended Collège Jean de la Mennais, an elementary and middle school in La Prairie, on the South Shore of Montreal, then attended Collège Jean-de-Brébeuf, a Catholic college preparatory secondary school and private college. There, she received a Quebec Diploma of College Studies in Arts and Communications.

In 1996, she returned to Hong Kong to take part in the New Talent Singing Awards (NTSA). Afterwards, she began her studies at Université du Québec à Montréal (UQAM) in graphic design. She was enrolled for only one semester before returning to Hong Kong to kickstart her career.

== Career ==
=== 1996–1999: Career begins ===
At age 19, Ho enrolled in the 1996 New Talent Singing Awards and to her stated surprise, won the competition.

This gave her the opportunity to meet Anita Mui, a renowned singer of Cantopop—"queen of Hong Kong movies and…renowned in the… world of Cantonese pop music"—of whom she had been a fan since childhood, and who would become her mentor following her win. This launched her career, and at this time she took on the stage name, "HoCC"; this gave her the opportunity to record an album, and gave her a recording contract with Capital Artists. In the intervening period between the contents win and her first album, Ho toured as a background vocalist with Mui, wrote the song "From Age Seventeen Onwards..." (由十七歲開始...) for Mui's album "I'm So Happy", and hosted various television programs produced by TVB.

=== 2000–2004: Breakthrough ===
Ho released her first album "First" in 2001, in her fourth year of the contract with Capital Artists. Produced by Choy Yat Chi of Grasshopper (band), this EP, containing her first single "Thousands More of Me" (千千萬萬個我) and "Home of Glory" (光榮之家), defined with success Ho's style as the rock pop independent female she is up till recent years. She earned the award of “Best New Singer” in various prize presentation ceremonies that year. In October, Capital Artists announced bankruptcy, resulting in the end of Ho's first record label era.

After Capital Artists closed, Ho joined EMI in 2002. Although she was only with the company for a brief 2-year period, it was during this time that her musical talents flourished. She teamed up with Ying C Foo (英師傅) for her first EMI label release, Hocc². The song "Angel Blues" (天使藍), composed by Ho herself, not only reached top spots on music charts, but according to Ho, it is also her "growing up" song.

Another single in the EP, "Rosemary" (露絲瑪莉), written by Wyman Wong, created considerable controversies at the time, as it touched on the topic of lesbianism. This song also marked the beginning of Ho's series of songs containing gay themes. Following the success of "Rosemary" (露絲瑪莉), Ho continued the story of the two lovers in "Goodbye... Rosemary" (再見...露絲瑪莉) in her first full-length album, free {love}.

In 2002, Ho's two singles "Angel Blues" (天使藍) and "Goodbye... Rosemary" (再見...露絲瑪莉) won multiple music awards in Hong Kong, including CASH Golden Sail Music Awards (CASH金帆音樂獎) – "Best Vocal Performance by a Female Artist" for the song "Angel Blues". In the same year, Ho won the renowned "Female Singer Bronze Award" in the Ultimate Song Chart Awards Presentation (叱吒樂壇流行榜頒獎典禮).

In 2003, Ho held a "Music is Live" concert with Andy Hui, who is also an apprentice of Anita Mui. Their performance won praise from the critics, and Ho proved to the audience her abilities to perform live as a musician. Later that year, Ho released her second full-length album "Dress Me Up!". She was the credited as the producer of the album, indicating that Ho has finally gained full control over her music. In September 2003, Ho's longtime mentor, Anita Mui announced she was diagnosed with cervical cancer. Shortly after the announcement, Anita lost her battle against cervical cancer and died on 30 December 2003.

Between 2003 and 2004, Ho took on the role of hosting TVB's weekly live music show, Jade Solid Gold. In 2004, she appeared in Sammi Cheng's 2004 "Sammi vs. Sammi" concert as a cross-dressing cigarette-smoking admirer of Sammi Cheng. Ho's critically acclaimed performance in the short musical segment not only brought attention to the role she played, but also further established herself as a tremendous live performer. In September 2004, Ho signed a contract with East Asia Music.

=== 2005–2009: Continued success ===
The album "Glamorous", which pays tribute to the superstars of the 1980s, was released in January 2005 after the death of Ho's mentor, Anita Mui. In a 2011 interview, Ho stated that her style during the period of "Glamorous" was one that departed most from her own self, but she believed that it was only due to such a method of tribute could she release her feelings and truly experience the authentic role of a singer. The album also marked the start of a close collaboration between Ho and the Green Mountain Orchestra band.

Ho was named the Orbis Student Ambassador 2005, and visited Hainan in July. In September 2005, Ho performed in the musical Butterfly Lovers (梁祝下世傳奇) as the leading actress, producer and musical director. Her album of the same name gave her three Number 1 singles – "Becoming a Butterfly" (化蝶), "Lawrence and Lewis" (勞斯．萊斯) and "Coffee in a Soda Bottle" (汽水樽裡的咖啡), which are all based on the story of the Butterfly Lovers, with possible homosexual themes. These singles helped her to receive the "Female Singer Silver Award" at the Ultimate Song Chart Awards Presentation 2005 (叱吒樂壇流行榜頒獎典禮).

Ho held her first Hong Kong Coliseum concert "Live in Unity 2006" on 26–28 October 2006. The concert was a great success and was positively received by the public. She decided to stage a second concert, "Live in Unity 2007", on 19–20 January 2007 following the original concert's success. Her single, "We Stand As One", named after the slogan for the "Live in Unity" concerts, was released on 11 January 2007. Recordings of the concert were later released in February 2007. She went on a worldwide tour, performing in Toronto, Canada and Atlantic City, New Jersey.

The significant public attention and positive reception to her music helped her garner the "Female Singer Gold Award" at the Ultimate Song Chart Awards Presentation 2006 (叱吒樂壇流行榜頒獎典禮). She sang the Chinese version of Ayumi Hamasaki's song "Secret", known as "Wounded City Secret" (傷城秘密), for the 2006 movie Confession of Pain. She continued as the Orbis Student Ambassador 2006 and visited Vietnam, and later started her own charitable fund. In 2008, a new album "Ten Days in the Madhouse" was released. She produced this album from the viewpoint of society's outcasts and to raise awareness of mental health issues. She encouraged people to understand and find out more about people with mental illnesses and those who formerly suffered from mental illnesses, and care about their needs and situations. Ho encouraged communication between them and the public, ultimately, to achieve social harmony. "Ten Days in the Madhouse" was Ho's most ambitious project. Yet, with the release of a documentary by Hong Kong director Yan Yan Mak (Butterfly) and an exhibition for charity, Ho showed that a multimedia project by a musician can be about something more important than clothing tie-ins.

In 2009, she followed up her plan from the previous year and organised a free concert called "Happiness is Free" in the outdoor courtyard of Diocesan Boys' School. She managed to book the place because her father was a teacher there. In June, she began shooting a new TVB sitcom titled O.L. Supreme with Liza Wang. In July, she released her new song "The Old Testament" (舊約) and announced that she would hold her "SUPERGOO" themed concerts from 9–12 October that year. Following the concerts, Ho took on a role in the new stage comedy "Man and Woman, War and Peace" (男人與女人之戰爭與和平) directed by Edward Lam. The stage comedy was presented on 13–16 November at Kwai Tsing Theatre in Hong Kong.

=== 2010–2015: Political awakening ===
In 2010, Ho appeared in the film Life Without Principle directed by Johnnie To. In September 2010, her first Mandarin album "Nameless Poem" (無名．詩) was released in Taiwan and Hong Kong, and she held "Homecoming" concerts in Hong Kong in December 2010. In 2011, Ho received her first nomination in the 22nd Golden Melody Awards as “Best Mandarin Female Singer”.

In 2012, she was nominated in the 49th Golden Horse Award for “Best Actress” for her performance in the movie “Life Without Principle”. In the same year, she came out as gay at the fourth annual Hong Kong Pride Parade, becoming the first "mainstream female singer in Hong Kong to come out of the closet". Since then, Ho has been actively involved in striving for LGBT rights.

In 2013, Ho continued the tour of her play, “Awakening”, in Singapore and in many cities in China. She released her second Mandarin album, “Coexistence”, which touches upon the theme of loving others despite differences. Ho received her second nomination in the 25th Golden Melody Awards as “Best Mandarin Female Singer” in 2014.

At the end of 2014, the Umbrella Movement emerged in Hong Kong. Ho was a staunch supporter of the movement, and was later arrested when the police cleared the protest camps. Her active participation in Hong Kong's large-scale social movement led her to be blacklisted and banned from performing in China.

=== 2015–present: Independent artist ===
In March 2015, Ho's contract with Media Asia Music (previously named as East Asia Music) expired. She announced in her Facebook and newspaper column in Apple Daily that she would become an independent artist. Afterwards, she organized multiple events on her own: “Reimagine Live”, a self-funded concert in Taiwan, and a local charity market co-organized with Nomad Nomad. On 19–24 August 2015, she also held a self-funded concert “Reimagine HK18” in Hong Kong Queen Elizabeth Stadium.

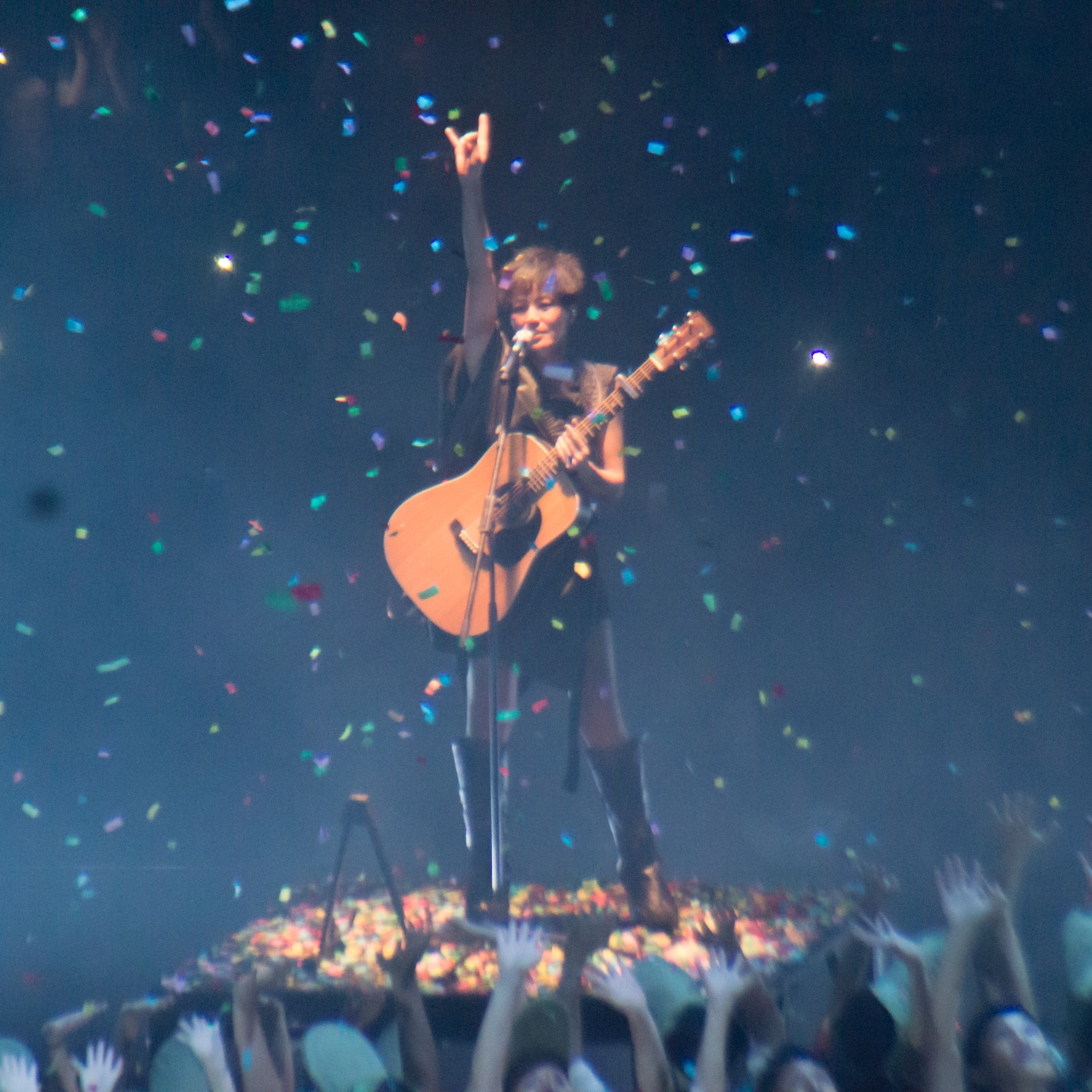
Ho performing at the "Dear Friend" Concert in 2016

On 7–10 October 2016, Ho returned to the Hong Kong Coliseum for her first crowdfunded concert “Dear Friend,”. As she was banned and blacklisted by China, Ho could not find any powerful sponsor that would support her shows. So she came up with a crowdfunding alternative she called “Togetherly Exclusive.” She invited individuals and small and medium enterprises to pledge sponsorship for the event. Eventually, sponsored by over 300 small enterprises and individuals, the four-day concert was successfully held and revisited 24 of the singer's greatest hits.

Approaching the end of 2016, Ho was selected by the BBC as one of the “100 Women 2016”. From the end of 2017 to 2018, she went on a worldwide tour called “Dear Self, Dear World”, performing in Britain, Taiwan and the United States and Canada. She originally planned to continue the tour in Malaysia, but was forced to cancel as her visa application was rejected by the Immigration Department of Malaysia. In May 2018, Ho published a new song “Polar”, marking her first attempt to write lyrics for a song. In September, Ho collaborated with Taiwanese band Chthonic on their song Millennia's Faith Undone, which required her to sing in Taiwanese Hokkien. Later, an acoustic version of the song was also released. At the end of 2018, she successfully organized a 6-day event called “On The Pulse Of” Festival in Hong Kong Science Park. The event is a combination of local market, music festival and Ho's concert. She tried to invite Chthonic to perform together in the festival, but the band's work visa application was denied. Eventually, Ho managed to make a joint performance on stage with Chthonic in her concert through video chat.

In 2019, Ho started to become an active speaker in international human rights forum. In May 2019, Ho was invited to participate in Oslo Freedom Forum. She made a speech on the topic “Under the umbrella : Creative dissent in Hong Kong” and performed “Polar” to the audience. Followed by that is Hong Kong's anti-extradition law amendment bill protests. Ho, as a Canto-pop star turned activist, got worldwide media coverage due to her active participation in the movement. On 8 July, she attended the United Nations Human Rights Council's meeting in Geneva. During her short speech, she called on the council to remove China from the body and convene an urgent session to protect Hongkongers, sparking two interruptions by Chinese delegate Dai Demao. On 20 August, Ho participated in Singularity University's (SU) annual Global Summit and did a keynote speech about how Hong Kong people utilize technology in their social movements.

On 29 December 2021, Ho and five other people linked to Stand News, including barrister Margaret Ng, were arrested by Hong Kong Police on suspicion of breaching the colonial-era law covering conspiracy to print or distribute seditious materials. Ho is a Canadian citizen who partly grew up in Montreal; a Canadian government spokesman expressed concern about the arrests and stated that Canada and its allies would issue a statement.

In 2021, Ho planned to organize a concert named Hocc Shouson Live 2021 (你尚未成為的) in Hong Kong Arts Centre's Shouson Theatre from 8 September to 12 September of the same year. Tickets starts being sold on 13 August 2021, and were sold out upon public release in two minutes. But eight days before the concert was set to begin, Hong Kong Arts Centre canceled their rental of the venue, citing public safety concerns. Ho's company goomusic pointed out that the performance had completely no possibility of endangering public order and safety, and disagreed with Hong Kong Arts Centre's decision. On 9 December 2021, an online concert was hosted instead.

On 2 April 2026, Ho released the album "Rive-Sud, Montréal", 13 years after her last album. It revolves around her experiences in Canada's Montreal during her youth, and is her first album to be released in vinyl and cassette format.

== Activism ==
When asked about the origins of her "passion for freedom of expression," Ho replied to reporter Frédéric Lelièvre of La Presse that it was probably from her being an adolescent in Montreal at the time of the 1995 Quebec referendum.

=== LGBT ===
Ho came out as lesbian, the first mainstream Cantonese singer to do so, at the fourth annual Hong Kong Pride Parade on 10 November 2012. Since then, Ho has been involved in the Big Love Alliance (大愛同盟), a civil rights group striving equal rights for the LGBT community. Ho faced a visa refusal by Malaysia in February 2018, which forced her to cancel the concert in April, allegedly related to her LGBT identity.

=== Pro-democracy activism ===
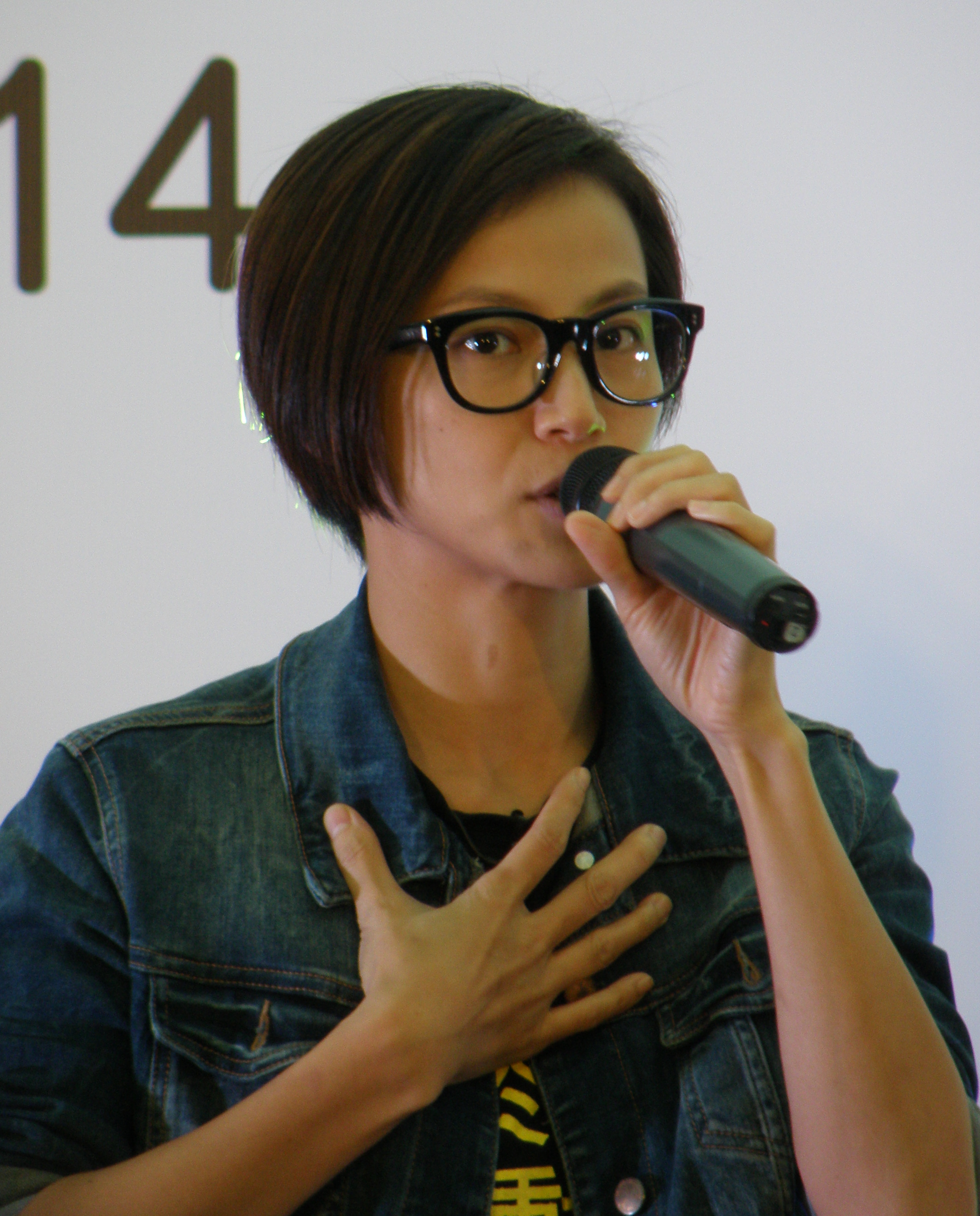
Ho at the Umbrella Movement in 2014

In 2014, Ho made her stance clear when police fired tear gas in a futile attempt to disperse thousands of mostly-young pro-democracy protesters who had taken to the streets for the "Umbrella Movement".

"That was an enraging moment for me and for many other Hong Kong people," Ho said. "As a celebrity, as a public persona, as an adult, you have to speak out in support of these students and these other Hong Kong citizens."

She took to the streets herself, becoming one of the movement's most outspoken supporters, and one of the last to be hauled off by the police when they cleared the protest camps.

On 5 June 2016, French cosmetics brand Lancôme cancelled a promotional concert by Denise Ho that was scheduled to be held on 19 June in Sheung Wan. This action was taken in response to a boycott campaign launched by the Communist Party-controlled Global Times, which accused her of supporting Hong Kong and Tibet independence, and backlash from mainland Chinese internet users. Lancôme added, in a Facebook post, that Ho is not a spokesperson for the brand. The Tibet allegation appeared to have stemmed from Ho's May 2016 meeting with the Dalai Lama. Ho says that citizens' wish for self-rule is not a crime.

Shortly after the Lancôme incident, Ho announced a crowd-sponsorship campaign named "Togetherly Exclusive Sponsorship" for her Hong Kong Coliseum concert "Dear Friend,”. It was planned to be held in October of the same year, in response to being avoided by corporates.

Approaching the end of 2016, Ho was selected by the BBC as one of the “100 Women 2016”.

In 2019, Ho became an active speaker in international human rights forum. In May 2019, Ho was invited to participate in Oslo Freedom Forum, a global platform for human rights defenders to share their stories. She made a speech on the topic “Under the umbrella : Creative dissent in Hong Kong” and performed “Polar” to the audience.

Followed by that was her response to Hong Kong's anti-extradition law amendment bill protests. Ho got worldwide media coverage due to her supposed active participation in the movement.

On 8 July, she attended the United Nations Human Rights Council's (UNHRC) meeting in Geneva. She asked the United Nations (UN) and the international community to protect the people of Hong Kong from infringements on their freedoms, saying that human rights were under "serious attack" in Hong Kong, and called on the UN to remove China from the Human Rights Council. According to Ho, China has engaged in kidnappings, jailed activists, disqualified pro-democracy lawmakers, and restricts universal suffrage. Her speech was interrupted twice by Chinese diplomat Dai Demao, who asserted Chinese sovereignty over Hong Kong. Dai accused Ho of "[mentioning] Hong Kong side-by-side with China", which he called an "affront" and accused her of using "abusive language."

Her speech at the UNHRC was in reference to the China extradition bill protests and the ongoing freedom and democracy movement in Hong Kong. Speaking about the protests, Ho stated that police engage in excessive force, and that if the Hong Kong government continues to ignore citizen demands the opposition movement will continue. During an interview prior to the UN session, Ho called Beijing's abuses a global issue, and mentioned Tibet and Xinjiang as regions also suffering from human rights violations.

On 20 August, Ho participated in Singularity University's (SU) annual Global Summit and did a keynote speech about how Hong Kong people utilize technology in their social movements. She attended the following events: Antidote 2019, a festival organized by the Sydney Opera House; "Be Water: Hong Kong vs China", a seminar co-organized with Badiucao in Melbourne; and this year's second Oslo Freedom Forum, which will take place in Taiwan.

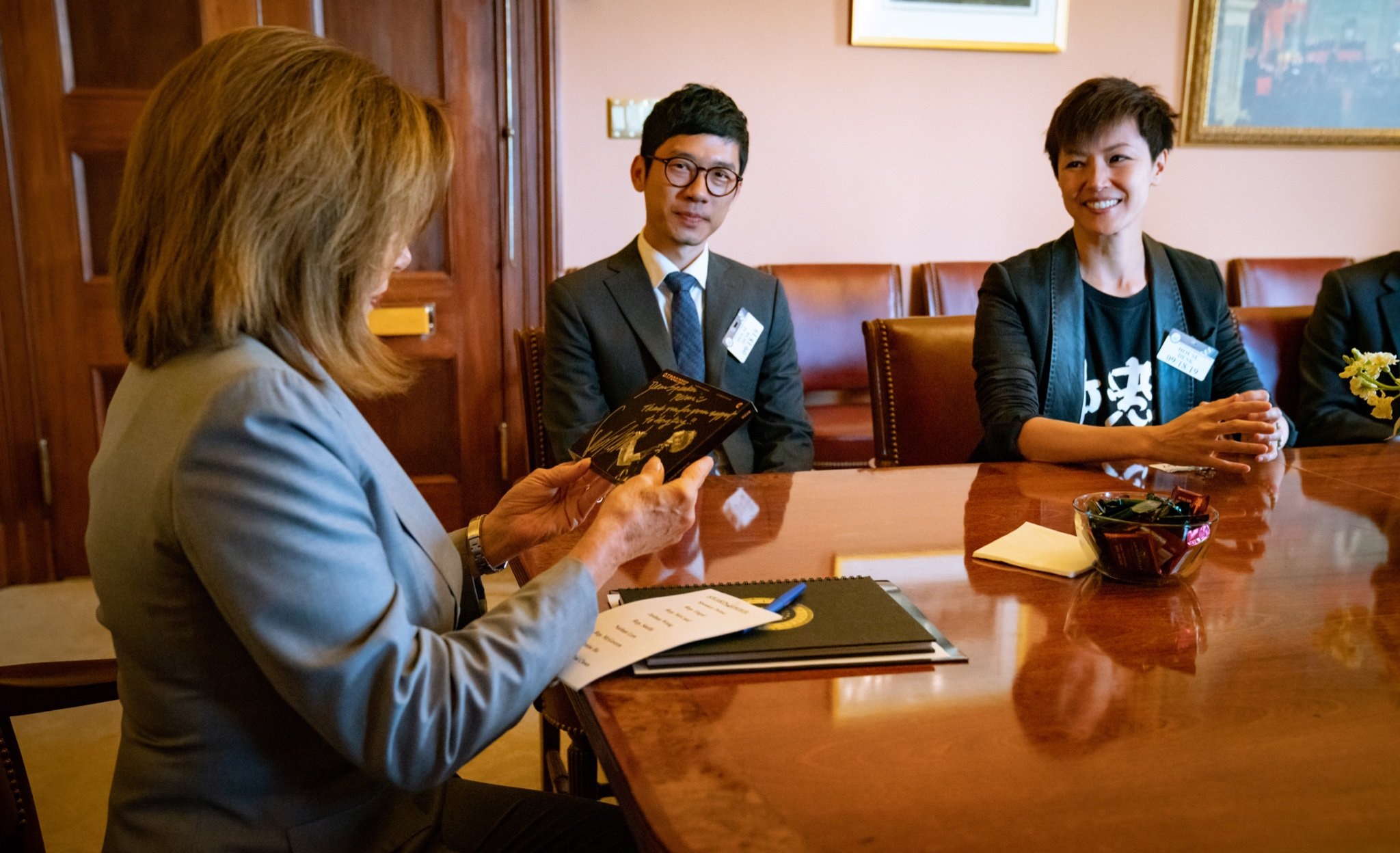
Ho (right) and Nathan Law meeting with U.S. House Speaker Nancy Pelosi

On 17 September, Ho and other activists participated in a Congressional-Executive Commission on China (CECC) commission in the United States Capitol. She emphasized that the Hong Kong police were using excessive violence on the protesters, and urged the U.S. Congress to pass the Hong Kong Human Rights and Democracy Act. In response, Chinese Foreign Ministry spokesman Geng Shuang called for foreign legislatures to not interfere in China's internal affairs. Ho rejected this in her testimony, saying, "This is not a plea for so-called foreign interference. This is a plea for democracy."

A 90-minute documentary film produced by Sue Williams, Denise Ho: Becoming the Song, released on 1 July 2020 in solidarity with the protest, marking the 23rd anniversary of Britain's handover of Hong Kong to China in 1997.

On 11 May 2022, Ho was arrested under the charge of "colluding with foreign forces" by the national security police.

== Discography ==
=== Studio albums ===
- first. (EP) (2001)
- hocc² (EP) (2002)
- free {love} (2002)
- Dress Me Up! (2003)
- Glamorous (2005)
- Butterfly Lovers (2005)
- Our Time Has Come (2006)
- What Really Matters (2007)
- Ten Days in the Madhouse (2008)
- Heroes (2009)
- Unnamed.Poem (2010)
- Awakening (2011)
- Coexistence (2013)
- Recollections (2013)
- Rive-Sud, Montréal (2026)

=== Compilation albums ===
- Roundup (New + Best Selection) (2003)
- Goomusic Collection 2004-2008 (2008)

=== Live albums ===
- HOCC Live in Unity (2007)
- Supergoo · Live (2009)
- Coexistence · Legacy Taipei Live (2013)
- Memento Live 2013 (2014)
- Reimagine Live 2015 (2015)
- Dear Friend, Concert 2016 Live (2017)
- Dear Self, Dear World · Live in Montreal (2019)
- On the Pulse of HOCC 2018 Live (2019)

== Filmography ==
=== Film ===
- 1998 – Rumble Ages (烈火青春)
- 1999 - Anti Crime Squad
- 2000 – The Slayer of Demons (妖怪傳) – Voice only: Sakuya (聲演: 神木櫻夜)
- 2003 – 1:99
- 2003 – Naked Ambition (豪情)
- 2003 – Anna in Kungfuland (安娜與武林)
- 2003 – Hidden Track (尋找周杰倫)
- 2006 – Superstition
- 2007 – The Simpsons Movie (阿森一族大電影) – Hong Kong Voice only: Bart Simpson
- 2008 – Kung Fu Panda (功夫熊貓) – Hong Kong Voice only: Tigress
- 2009 – Look for a Star (游龍戲鳳)
- 2010 – 72 Tenants of Prosperity (72家租客)
- 2010 – Merry-Go-Round (東風破)
- 2011 – Kung Fu Panda (功夫熊貓) – Hong Kong Voice only: Tigress
- 2011 – Life Without Principle (奪命金)
- 2012 – I Love Hong Kong 2012 (2012我愛HK 喜上加囍)
- 2013 – Young and Dangerous: Reloaded (古惑仔：江湖新秩序)
- 2020 – Denise Ho: Becoming the Song – documentary film produced by Sue Williams

=== TV series ===
- 1999 – Anti-Crime Squad (反黑先鋒) as 單解心
- 2004 – Shanghai Legend (上海灘之俠醫傳奇)as 江雪
- 2010 – O.L. Supreme (女王辦公室) as Music Miu 繆惜之

== Concerts and tours ==
- Live in Unity (2006)
- Happiness is Free (2009)
- Supergoo (2009)
- Homecoming Live (2010)
- Memento Live (2013)
- Reimagine Hong Kong (2015)
- Dear Friend, (2016)
- Dear Self, Dear World (2017-2018)
- On the Pulse of (2018)

== International conferences and talks ==
- May 2019 – Oslo Freedom Forum (Oslo)
- July 2019 – United Nations Human Rights Council's meeting (Geneva)
- August 2019 – Singularity University's (SU) annual Global Summit (San Francisco)
- September 2019 – Antidote 2019 by Sydney Opera House (Sydney)
- September 2019 – "Be Water: Hong Kong vs China" Seminar with Badiucao (Melbourne)
- September 2019 – Oslo Freedom Forum (Taipei)
- October 2019 – Oslo Freedom Forum (New York)
- December 2019 – TEDWomen — Brilliant and Bold
- February 2020 – Geneva Summit for Human Rights and Democracy — (Geneva)

== Awards and nominations ==
Ho has received numerous awards. As a solo artist she has achieved IFPI's "Top 10 Best-selling Local Artists Award" for 9 consecutive years, making her one of the best-selling artists in Hong Kong. She had also won the title of "Best Female Singer" and "My Favourite Female Singer" in the CRHK Ultimate Song Chart Awards Presentation over the past years, securing her position as a leading pop diva in the city. In recent years, although she is blacklisted by China, she has started up her own record label and continued to produce music. In 2019, she has collaborated with Chthonic, a Taiwanese band, to make the song "Millennia's Faith Undone". The song was nominated as "Song of the Year" in the 30th Golden Melody Awards.

Despite her robust music career, she has also made numerous attempts in the area of film and drama. As one of the leading actress in Johnnie To's award-winning film, "Life Without Principles", she had received recognition for her performance by achieving nominations and awards in the Hong Kong Film Awards, Golden Horse Awards and Chinese Film Media Awards respectively.

=== Films ===
Award	Year	Category	Recipient(s) and nominee(s)	Result	Ref.
The 12th Chinese Film Media Awards (第十二屆華語電影傳媒大獎)	2012	Best Supporting Actress	Herself (Life Without Principles, directed by Johnnie To)	Won	
The 49th Golden Horse Awards (第四十九屆台灣金馬獎)	2012	Best Leading Actress	Herself (Life Without Principles, directed by Johnnie To)	Nominated	
The 29th Hong Kong Film Awards (第二十九屆香港電影金像獎)	2010	Best Supporting Actress	Herself (Look for a Star, directed by Andrew Lau)	Nominated	
The 29th Hong Kong Film Awards (第二十九屆香港電影金像獎)	2010	Best Dressed Award	Herself	Won	

=== Dramas ===
Award	Year	Category	Recipient(s) and nominee(s)	Result	Ref.
Shanghai Jing'an Modern Drama Valley One Drama Awards (上海現代戲劇谷壹戲劇大賞)	2013	Best New Actress of the year	Herself (Awakening)	Won	

=== Music ===
Award	Year	Category	Recipient(s) and nominee(s)	Result	Ref.
Golden Melody Awards (台灣金曲獎)	2019	Song of the Year (年度歌曲獎)	"Millennia's Faith Undone (The Aeon's Wraith Version)" (With CHTHONIC) (烏牛欄大護法(望天版)(與閃靈))	Nominated	
Golden Melody Awards (台灣金曲獎)	2014	Best Mandarin Female Singer (最佳國語女歌手獎)	"Coexistence" (共存)	Nominated	
IFPI Hong Kong Top Sales Music Award (IFPI唱片銷量獎)	2014	10 Best Selling Local Singers (十大銷量本地歌手)	Herself	Won	
IFPI Hong Kong Top Sales Music Award (IFPI唱片銷量獎)	2014	10 Best Selling Local Live Recordings (十大最暢銷本地現場錄製音像)	"Memento 2013"	Won	
CRHK Ultimate Song Chart Awards Presentation (商業電台 叱咤樂壇流行榜頒獎典禮)	2014	Ultimate My Favourite Song (叱咤樂壇我最喜愛的歌曲大獎)	"Raise The Umbrella" (撐起雨傘)	Won	
IFPI Hong Kong Top Sales Music Award (IFPI唱片銷量獎)	2013	Best Selling Mandarin Album (最高銷量國語專輯)	"Coexistence" (共存)	Won	
IFPI Hong Kong Top Sales Music Award (IFPI唱片銷量獎)	2013	10 Best Selling Mandarin Albums (十大銷量國語專輯)	"Wu Lian Ren" (無臉人)	Won	
IFPI Hong Kong Top Sales Music Award (IFPI唱片銷量獎)	2013	10 Best Selling Local Singers (十大銷量本地歌手)	Herself	Won	
IFPI Hong Kong Top Sales Music Award (IFPI唱片銷量獎)	2013	10 Best Selling Cantonese Albums (十大銷量粵語專輯)	"Recollections"	Won	
CRHK Ultimate Song Chart Awards Presentation (商業電台 叱咤樂壇流行榜頒獎典禮)	2013	Ultimate My Favourite Female Singer (叱咤樂壇我最喜愛的女歌手)	Herself	Won	
IFPI Hong Kong Top Sales Music Award (IFPI唱片銷量獎)	2012	10 Best Selling Local Singers (十大銷量本地歌手)	Herself	Won	
IFPI Hong Kong Top Sales Music Award (IFPI唱片銷量獎)	2012	10 Best Selling Local Live Recordings (十大最暢銷本地現場錄製音像)	"Meng - Hai Mei You Wan" (夢 - 還沒有完)	Won	
Chinese Music Awards (華語金曲獎)	2012	Best Cantonese Female Singer (最佳粵語女歌手)	Herself	Won	
Chinese Music Awards (華語金曲獎)	2012	Annual Stage Award (年度舞台大獎)	Herself	Won	
Chinese Music Awards (華語金曲獎)	2012	My Favourite Singer-songwriter (我最喜愛的唱作歌手)	Herself	Won	
Chinese Music Awards (華語金曲獎)	2012	10 Best Chinese Songs (十大華語金曲)	"Chi Qing Shi" (癡情司)	Won	
Chinese Music Awards (華語金曲獎)	2012	10 Best Chinese Albums 十大華語唱片	"Awakening"	Won	
IFPI Hong Kong Top Sales Music Award (IFPI唱片銷量獎)	2011	10 Best Selling Local Albums (十大銷量本地唱片)	"Awakening"	Won	
IFPI Hong Kong Top Sales Music Award (IFPI唱片銷量獎)	2011	10 Best Selling Local Singers (十大銷量本地歌手)	Herself	Won	
CRHK Ultimate Song Chart Awards Presentation (商業電台 叱咤樂壇流行榜頒獎典禮)	2011	Ultimate Female Singer - Bronze (叱咤樂壇女歌手 銅獎)	Herself	Won	
Metro Radio's Hit Music Awards (新城勁爆頒獎禮)	2011	My Favourite Female Singer (新城勁爆我最欣賞女歌手)	Herself	Won	
Metro Radio's Hit Music Awards (新城勁爆頒獎禮)	2011	Metro Radio's Top Hit Songs (新城勁爆歌曲)	"Chi Qing Shi" (癡情司)	Won	
TVB8 Mandarin Mod Best 10 Awards Presentation (TVB8金曲榜頒獎禮)	2011	Gold Song (金曲)	"Qing Kong" (青空)	Won	
Ming Pao Artists' Motivation Awards (明周演藝動力大獎)	2011	愛心動力大獎	Herself	Won	
Sprite Music Chart Awards (雪碧榜頒獎禮)	2011	Best Female Singer in Hong Kong Territory (香港地區最佳女歌手)	Herself	Won	
Sprite Music Chart Awards (雪碧榜頒獎禮)	2011	Best Songs (歌曲)	"Qing Kong" (青空)	Won	
Golden Melody Awards (台灣金曲獎)	2010	Best Mandarin Female Singer (最佳國語女歌手獎)	"Wu Ming, Shi" (無名．詩)	Nominated	
Golden Melody Awards (台灣金曲獎)	2010	Best Single Producer (最佳單曲製作人獎)	"Shi Yu Hu Shuo" (詩與胡說)	Nominated	
Metro Radio's Hit Music Awards (新城勁爆頒獎禮)	2010	Best Female Singer (新城勁爆女歌手)	Herself	Won	
Metro Radio's Hit Music Awards (新城勁爆頒獎禮)	2010	Top Hit Mandarin Songs (新城勁爆國語歌曲)	"Shi Yu Hu Shuo" (詩與胡說)	Won	
Metro Radio's Hit Music Awards (新城勁爆頒獎禮)	2010	Top Hit Mandarin Albums (新城勁爆國語專輯)	"Wu Ming, Shi" (無名．詩)	Won	
Metro Radio Mandarin Hits Music Awards (新城國語力頒獎禮)	2010	Best Songs (歌曲)	"Shi Yu Hu Shuo" (詩與胡說)	Won	
Metro Radio Mandarin Hits Music Awards (新城國語力頒獎禮)	2010	Best Performance (優秀演繹)	"Shi Yu Hu Shuo" (詩與胡說)	Won	
TVB8 Mandarin Mod Best 10 Awards Presentation (TVB8金曲榜頒獎禮)	2010	Gold Song (金曲)	"Shi Yu Hu Shuo" (詩與胡說)	Won	
China Fashion Awards (星尚大典)	2010	星尚原創先鋒人物	Herself	Won	
Sprite Music Chart Awards (雪碧榜頒獎禮)	2010	Best Female Singer in Hong Kong Territory (香港地區最佳女歌手)	Herself	Won	
Sprite Music Chart Awards (雪碧榜頒獎禮)	2010	Best Songs (歌曲)	"Wu Ming" (無名)	Won	
IFPI Hong Kong Top Sales Music Award (IFPI唱片銷量獎)	2010	Best Selling Mandarin Album (最高銷量國語專輯)	"Wu Ming, Shi" (無名．詩)	Won	
IFPI Hong Kong Top Sales Music Award (IFPI唱片銷量獎)	2010	10 Best Selling Mandarin Albums (十大銷量國語專輯)	"Wu Ming, Shi" (無名．詩)	Won	
IFPI Hong Kong Top Sales Music Award (IFPI唱片銷量獎)	2010	10 Best Selling Local Singers (十大銷量本地歌手)	Herself	Won	
CRHK Ultimate Song Chart Awards Presentation (商業電台 叱咤樂壇流行榜頒獎典禮)	2009	Top 10 Professional Recommended Song - 10th Place (專業推介叱咤十大 第十位)	"Ni Ge" (妮歌)	Won	
Jade Solid Gold Best Ten Music Awards (TVB十大勁歌金曲頒獎典禮)	2009	Gold Song (金曲)	"Jin Gang Jing" (金剛經)	Won	
Metro Radio's Hit Music Awards (新城勁爆頒獎禮)	2009	Top Hit Self-produced Albums (新城勁爆創作大碟)	Heroes	Won	
Jade Solid Gold Selections (TVB勁歌金曲優秀選)	2009	Best Songs	"Mei Kong Yun Que" (美空雲雀)	Won	
Jado Solid Gold Selections (TVB勁歌金曲優秀選)	2009	Best Songs	"Jin Gang Jing" (金剛經)	Won	
IFPI Hong Kong Top Sales Music Award (IFPI唱片銷量獎)	2009	10 Best Selling Local Singers (十大銷量本地歌手)	Herself	Won	
Jade Solid Gold Best Ten Music Awards (TVB十大勁歌金曲頒獎典禮)	2008	Gold Song (金曲)	"Yun Lu Yong" (韻律泳)	Won	
Metro Radio's Hit Music Awards (新城勁爆頒獎禮)	2008	Top Hit Songs (新城勁爆歌曲)	"Qing Shan Dai Ma" (青山黛瑪)	Won	
Metro Radio's Hit Music Awards (新城勁爆頒獎禮)	2008	Best Performing Singer (新城勁爆演繹歌手大獎)	Herself	Won	
Metro Radio's Hit Music Awards (新城勁爆頒獎禮)	2008	Top Hit Self-produced Albums (新城勁爆創作大碟)	Ten Days in the Madhouse	Won	
Metro Radio's Hit Music Awards (新城勁爆頒獎禮)	2008	Best Female Singer (新城勁爆女歌手)	Herself	Won	
Sina Music Awards (Sina Music樂壇民意指數頒獎禮)	2008	Best Concept Album (創作概念大碟獎)	Ten Days in the Madhouse	Won	
Sina Music Awards (Sina Music樂壇民意指數頒獎禮)	2008	Most Played Song (最高收聽率歌曲)	"Qing Shan Dai Ma" (青山黛瑪)	Won	
Sina Music Awards (Sina Music樂壇民意指數頒獎禮)	2008	My Favourite Singer-songwriter (我最喜愛唱作人)	Herself	Won	
Jade Solid Gold Selections (TVB勁歌金曲優秀選)	2008	Best Songs	"Yun Lu Yong" "Qing Shan Dai Ma" (韻律泳、青山黛瑪)	Won	
Metro Radio Mandarin Hits Music Awards (新城國語力頒獎禮)	2008	Best Female Singer, Popular Karaoke Song, Best Songs (女歌手、熱爆K歌、歌曲)	Herself; "Wood Grain" (木紋); "Wood Grain" (木紋)	Won	
The 9th Chinese Music Media Awards (第九屆華語音樂傳媒大獎)	2008	Professional Tribute Annual Awards (評審團專業致敬年度大獎)	Ten Days in the Madhouse	Won	
IFPI Hong Kong Top Sales Music Award (IFPI唱片銷量獎)	2008	10 Best Selling Local Singers (十大銷量本地歌手)	Herself	Won	
IFPI Hong Kong Top Sales Music Award (IFPI唱片銷量獎)	2008	10 Best Selling Cantonese Albums (十大銷量國語專輯)	goomusicollection 2004-2008	Won	
CRHK Ultimate Song Chart Awards Presentation (商業電台 叱咤樂壇流行榜頒獎典禮)	2007	Ultimate Female Singer - Silver (叱咤樂壇女歌手 銀獎)	Herself	Won	
CRHK Ultimate Song Chart Awards Presentation (商業電台 叱咤樂壇流行榜頒獎典禮)	2007	Top 10 Professional Recommended Song - 5th Place (專業推介叱咤十大 第五位)	"Wood Grain" (木紋)	Won	
Jade Solid Gold Best Ten Music Awards (TVB十大勁歌金曲頒獎典禮)	2007	Gold Song (金曲)	"Wood Grain" (木紋)	Won	
Metro Radio's Hit Music Awards (新城勁爆頒獎禮)	2007	Best Female Singer (新城勁爆女歌手)	Herself	Won	
Metro Radio's Hit Music Awards (新城勁爆頒獎禮)	2007	Top Hit Songs (新城勁爆歌曲)	"Wood Grain" (木紋)	Won	
Metro Radio's Hit Music Awards (新城勁爆頒獎禮)	2007	Top Hit Self-produced Albums (新城勁爆創作大碟)	"What Really Matters"	Won	
Roadshow Music Awards (Roadshow至尊音樂頒獎禮)	2007	Best Female Singer (至尊女歌手)	Herself	Won	
Roadshow Music Awards (Roadshow至尊音樂頒獎禮)	2007	Best Song (至尊歌曲)	"Wood Grain" (木紋)	Won	
Roadshow Music Awards (Roadshow至尊音樂頒獎禮)	2007	Best SInger-songwriter (至尊創作歌手)	Herself	Won	
Jade Solid Gold Selections (TVB勁歌金曲優秀選)	2007	Best Songs	"Third Person" 第三身	Won	
Jade Solid Gold Selections (TVB勁歌金曲優秀選)	2007	Best Songs	"Wood Grain" (木紋)	Won	
TVB8 Mandarin Mod Best 10 Awards Presentation (TVB8金曲榜頒獎禮)	2007	Gold Song (金曲)	"Wood Grain" (Mandarin) 木紋(國語)	Won	
Metro Radio Mandarin Hits Music Awards (新城國語力頒獎禮)	2007	Best Songs	"Wounded City Secret" (傷城秘密)	Won	
Sprite Music Chart Awards (雪碧榜頒獎禮)	2007	RTHK Gold Song Award (港台金曲獎)	"Wood Grain" (木紋)	Won	
Sprite Music Chart Awards (雪碧榜頒獎禮)	2007	Media Recommendation Award (傳媒推薦大獎)	Herself	Won	
9+2 Music Pioneer Awards (9+2音樂先鋒榜)	2007	Pioneer Performance Singer (先鋒演繹歌手)	Herself	Won	
9+2 Music Pioneer Awards (9+2音樂先鋒榜)	2007	Best Pioneer Singer-songwriter (最佳先鋒創作歌手)	Herself	Won	
9+2 Music Pioneer Awards (9+2音樂先鋒榜)	2007	RTHK Best Pioneer Singer (電台聯頒港台最佳先鋒歌手)	Herself	Won	
IFPI Hong Kong Top Sales Music Award (IFPI唱片銷量獎)	2007	10 Best Selling Local Singers (十大銷量本地歌手)	Herself	Won	
IFPI Hong Kong Top Sales Music Award (IFPI唱片銷量獎)	2007	10 Best Selling Cantonese Albums (十大銷量廣東唱片)	"What Really Matters"	Won	
CRHK Ultimate Song Chart Awards Presentation (商業電台 叱咤樂壇流行榜頒獎典禮)	2006	Ultimate Female Singer - Gold (叱咤樂壇女歌手 金獎)	Herself	Won	
CRHK Ultimate Song Chart Awards Presentation (商業電台 叱咤樂壇流行榜頒獎典禮)	2006	Top 10 Professional Recommended Song - 5th Place (專業推介叱咤十大 第五位)	"Gather Up" (光明會)	Won	
Jade Solid Gold Best Ten Music Awards (TVB十大勁歌金曲頒獎典禮)	2006	Gold Song (金曲)	"Gather Up" (光明會)	Won	
Metro Radio's Hit Music Awards (新城勁爆頒獎禮)	2006	Best Female Singer (新城勁爆女歌手)	Herself	Won	
Metro Radio's Hit Music Awards (新城勁爆頒獎禮)	2006	Best Stage (新城勁爆舞台)	Herself	Won	
Metro Radio's Hit Music Awards (新城勁爆頒獎禮)	2006	Top Hit Songs (新城勁爆歌曲)	"Gather Up" (光明會)	Won	
Metro Radio's Hit Music Awards (新城勁爆頒獎禮)	2006	Top Hit Original Advert Song (新城勁爆原創廣告歌曲)	"Gather Up" (光明會)	Won	
RTHK Top Ten Chinese Gold Songs Award (香港電台十大中文金曲頒獎音樂會)	2006	10 Best Singers (十大優秀歌手)	Herself	Won	
Roadshow Music Awards (Roadshow至尊音樂頒獎禮)	2006	Best Female Singer (至尊女歌手)	Herself	Won	
Roadshow Music Awards (Roadshow至尊音樂頒獎禮)	2006	Best Song (至尊歌曲)	"Gather Up" (光明會)	Won	
Jade Solid Gold Selections (TVB勁歌金曲優秀選)	2006	Best Songs	"Complete" 圓滿	Won	
Jade Solid Gold Selections (TVB勁歌金曲優秀選)	2006	Best Songs	"I Wish I Can Give Up On You" 願我可以學會放低你	Won	
Jade Solid Gold Selections (TVB勁歌金曲優秀選)	2006	Best Songs	"Gather Up" (光明會)	Won	
MTV Super Ceremony (MTV超級盛典)	2006	RTHK's Most Stylish New Singer (港台最具風格新銳歌手獎)	Herself	Won	
TVB8 Mandarin Mod Best 10 Awards Presentation (TVB8金曲榜頒獎禮)	2006	Gold Song (金曲)	"Forgotten Who You Are" (忘了你是你)	Won	
Metro Radio Mandarin Hits Music Awards (新城國語力頒獎禮)	2006	Best Songs	"Forgotten Who You Are" (忘了你是你)	Won	
The 7th Chinese Music Media Awards (第九屆華語音樂傳媒大獎)	2006	Best Cantonese Female Singer (最佳粵語女歌手)	Herself	Won	
Super Singer Annual Selection Awards (勁歌王年度總選頒獎典禮)	2006	Top 10 Cantonese Gold Song (十大粵語金曲獎)	"Gather Up" (光明會)	Won	
Super Singer Annual Selection Awards (勁歌王年度總選頒獎典禮)	2006	Best Stage Performance Award (最佳舞台演繹獎)	Herself	Won	
Super Singer Annual Selection Awards (勁歌王年度總選頒獎典禮)	2006	Most Popular Advert Song Award (最受歡迎廣告歌曲獎)	"Gather Up" (光明會)	Won	
IFPI Hong Kong Top Sales Music Award (IFPI唱片銷量獎)	2006	10 Best Selling Cantonese Singers (十大暢銷粵語歌手)	Herself	Won	
CRHK Ultimate Song Chart Awards Presentation (商業電台 叱咤樂壇流行榜頒獎典禮)	2005	Ultimate Female Singer - Silver (叱咤樂壇女歌手 銀獎)	Herself	Won	
Jade Solid Gold Best Ten Music Awards (TVB十大勁歌金曲頒獎典禮)	2005	Gold Song (金曲)	"Louis and Lawrence" (勞斯．萊斯)	Won	
Jade Solid Gold Best Ten Music Awards (TVB十大勁歌金曲頒獎典禮)	2005	Best Performance Award - Gold (傑出表現獎)	Herself	Won	
Metro Radio's Hit Music Awards (新城勁爆頒獎禮)	2005	Top Hit Songs (新城勁爆歌曲)	"Butterfly" (化蝶)	Won	
Metro Radio's Hit Music Awards (新城勁爆頒獎禮)	2005	Best Female Singer (新城勁爆女歌手)	Herself	Won	
Metro Radio's Hit Music Awards (新城勁爆頒獎禮)	2005	Best Singer-songwriter (新城勁爆創作歌手)	Herself	Won	
RTHK Top Ten Chinese Gold Songs Award (香港電台十大中文金曲頒獎音樂會)	2005	10 Best Singers (十大優秀歌手)	Herself	Won	
RTHK Top Ten Chinese Gold Songs Award (香港電台十大中文金曲頒獎音樂會)	2005	Most Improved Award (年度最佳進步獎)	Herself	Won	
Roadshow Music Awards (Roadshow至尊音樂頒獎禮)	2005	Best Female Singer (至尊女歌手)	Herself	Won	
Roadshow Music Awards (Roadshow至尊音樂頒獎禮)	2005	Best Song (至尊歌曲)	"Butterfly" (化蝶)	Won	
Sina Music Awards (Sina Music樂壇民意指數頒獎禮)	2005	My Favourite Singer-songwriter (我最喜愛唱作人)	Herself	Won	
Sina Music Awards (Sina Music樂壇民意指數頒獎禮)	2005	My Favourite Melody (我最喜愛的旋律)	"Butterfly" (化蝶)	Won	
Ming Pao Artists' Motivation Awards (明周演藝動力大獎)	2005	The Most Outstanding Female Singer (最突出女歌手)	Herself	Won	
Ming Pao Artists' Motivation Awards (明周演藝動力大獎)	2005	The Most Outstanding Album (最突出唱片)	"Butterfly Lovers" (梁祝下世傳奇)	Won	
IFPI Hong Kong Top Sales Music Award (IFPI唱片銷量獎)	2005	10 Best Selling Local Singers (十大銷量本地歌手)	Herself	Won	
Metro Radio's Hit Music Awards (新城勁爆頒獎禮)	2004	Top Hit Songs (新城勁爆歌曲)	"Glamorous" (艷光四射)	Won	
Metro Radio's Hit Music Awards (新城勁爆頒獎禮)	2004	Top Hit Original Songs (新城勁爆原創歌曲)	"Glamorous" (艷光四射)	Won	
Jade Solid Gold Selections (TVB勁歌金曲優秀選)	2004	Best Songs	"Glamorous" (艷光四射)	Won	
Metro Radio's Hit Music Awards (新城勁爆頒獎禮)	2003	Top Hit Songs (新城勁爆歌曲)	"Sand" (沙)	Won	
Metro Radio's Hit Music Awards (新城勁爆頒獎禮)	2003	Grand Music Award - Outstanding Performance - Bronze (四台聯頒音樂大獎 卓越表現大獎 銅獎)	Herself	Won	
CRHK Ultimate Song Chart Awards Presentation (商業電台 叱咤樂壇流行榜頒獎典禮)	2002	Ultimate Female Singer - Bronze (叱咤樂壇女歌手 銅獎)	Herself	Won	
CRHK Ultimate Song Chart Awards Presentation (商業電台 叱咤樂壇流行榜頒獎典禮)	2002	Top 10 Professional Recommended Song - 9th Place (專業推介叱咤十大 第九位)	"Goodbye... Rosemary) (再見露絲瑪莉)	Won	
Jade Solid Gold Best Ten Music Awards (TVB十大勁歌金曲頒獎典禮)	2002	Most Popular Song Online - Silver (最受歡迎網上歌曲 銀獎)	"Goodbye... Rosemary) (再見露絲瑪莉)	Won	
Jade Solid Gold Best Ten Music Awards (TVB十大勁歌金曲頒獎典禮)	2002	Most Popular Singer-songwriter (最受歡迎唱作歌星)	Herself	Won	
Metro Radio's Hit Music Awards (新城勁爆頒獎禮)	2002	Top Hit Songs (新城勁爆歌曲)	"Angel Blues" (天使藍)	Won	
Metro Radio's Hit Music Awards (新城勁爆頒獎禮)	2002	Grand Music Award - Outstanding Performance - Silver (四台聯頒音樂大獎 卓越表現大獎 銀獎)	Herself	Won	
CASH Golden Sail Music Awards (CASH金帆音樂獎頒獎典禮)	2002	Best Performance Female Singer (最佳女歌手演繹獎)	"Angel Blues" (天使藍)	Won	
CRHK Ultimate Song Chart Awards Presentation (商業電台 叱咤樂壇流行榜頒獎典禮)	2001	Ultimate New Female Singer - Gold (叱吒樂壇新力軍女歌手 金獎)	Herself	Won	
Jade Solid Gold Best Ten Music Awards (TVB十大勁歌金曲頒獎典禮)	2001	Most Popular New Female Singer - Gold (最受歡迎女新人 金獎)	Herself	Won	
Metro Radio's Hit Music Awards (新城勁爆頒獎禮)	2001	Top Hit New Female Singer (新城勁爆新登場女歌手)	Herself	Won	
RTHK Top Ten Chinese Gold Songs Award (香港電台十大中文金曲頒獎音樂會)	2001	Top Prospect New Female Singer - Silver (最有前途女新人獎 銀獎)	Herself	Won	
The 15th New Talent Singing Awards (第15屆新秀歌唱大賽)	1996	Champion	Herself	Won	

== See also ==
- LGBT culture in Hong Kong
- 2014 Umbrella Revolution
- 2019–20 Hong Kong protests

Preceded by Eason Chan 陳奕迅	New Talent Singing Awards winner 1996	Succeeded by Wilfred Lau 劉浩龍
