= Top Ten Chinese Gold Songs Award =

Music award from Hong Kong

Top Ten Chinese Gold Songs Awards (Chinese: 十大中文金曲頒獎音樂會) is one of the main C-pop music award in Hong Kong. The award is sponsored by RTHK. Beginning in 1978, it is the oldest major award in Hong Kong, even earlier than the Jade Solid Gold Awards. The ceremony is usually held in January following the end of the previous music season. It usually takes place at the Hong Kong Coliseum, sometimes at the Sha Tin Racecourse.

== Award format ==
The standard format is that the top 10 songs of each year are presented. Also a "Golden Needle" award is presented in some ceremonies as lifetime achievements.

=== 1970s awards ===
1978, 1979

=== 1980s awards ===
1980, 1981, 1982, 1983, 1984, 1985, 1986, 1987, 1988, 1989

=== 1990s awards ===
1990, 1991, 1992, 1993, 1994, 1995, 1996, 1997, 1998, 1999

=== 2000s awards ===
2000, 2001, 2002, 2003, 2004, 2005, 2006, 2007, 2008, 2009

=== 2010s awards ===
2010, 2011, 2012, 2013, 2014, 2015, 2016, 2017, 2019

== Golden Needle Award ==
The award is not given every year.

Year	Recipient	Awarding Age
1981	Joseph Koo	50
1983	Nonoy Ocampo	51
1984	Lau Tung	Unknown
1985	Samuel Hui	37
1986	Tang Ti-sheng	Posthumous
1987	Chen Dieyi	80
1988	The Wynners	35-37
1989	Paula Tsui	40
1990	James Wong Jim	49
1991	Roman Tam	46
1992	Cheng Kwok-kong	51
1994	George Lam	47
1995	Teresa Teng	Posthumous
1996	Alan Tam	46
1998	Anita Mui	35
1999	Leslie Cheung	43
2000	Jacky Cheung	39
2003	Richard Lam	Posthumous
2004	Liza Wang	57
2005	Hong Kong Chinese Orchestra	—N/a
2006	Adam Cheng	59
2007	Teresa Carpio	50
2008	Albert Leung	47
2009	Danny Chan	Posthumous
2010	Sally Yeh	49
2011	Jenny Tseng	58
2014	Jimmy Lo	66
2015	Kenny Bee	62
2016	Tai Chi	50-57
2019	Tat Ming Pair	56-57
2026	Lowell Lo	75

== International Pop Poll Awards ==
RTHK also presents the International Pop Poll Awards annually. James Fung Wai-tong, chairman of the organising committee, said that from 1990 onwards, the awards ceremony had already given prizes to over 200 international pop songs, widening the perspectives of both the public and the local music industry with a diversified music culture.

== See also ==
- Jade Solid Gold Awards
- New Talent Singing Awards
- List of Hong Kong music awards
