= 2005 RTHK Top 10 Gold Songs Awards =

Hong Kong music awards ceremony

The 28th RTHK Top 10 Gold Songs Awards (Chinese: 第二十八屆十大中文金曲頒獎音樂會) was held in 2006 for the 2005 music season.

== Top 10 song awards ==
The top 10 songs (十大中文金曲) of 2006 are as follows.

| Song name in Chinese | Artist | Composer | Lyricist |
|---|---|---|---|
| 夕陽無限好 | Eason Chan | Eric Kwok | Albert Leung |
| 再說一次我愛你 | Andy Lau | Kim Heon Jick | Andy Lau, Li An-xiu (李安修) |
| 無賴 | Ronald Cheng | Li Jun-yi (李峻一) | Li Jun-yi (李峻一) |
| 老鼠愛大米 | Wang Qi-wen (王啟文) | Yang Chengang (楊臣剛) | Yang Chengang (楊臣剛) |
| 他約我去迪士尼 | Kelly Chen, Kellyjackie | Kellyjackie | Hai La (海藍), Xu Yuan-ting (許願庭) |
| 明日恩典 translated version of (Amazing Grace) | Joey Yung | John Newton | Wyman Wong |
| 烈女 | Miriam Yeung | Mark Lui | Albert Leung |
| 情非首爾 | Hacken Lee | Harry Ng Chung Hang (伍仲衡) | Hacken Lee |
| 天才與白痴 | Leo Ku | Clayton Cheung Kai Tim (張佳添), Zheng Ru-lin (鄭汝霖) | Albert Leung |
| 好人 | Justin Lo | Robert Lay (on your mark) | Albert Leung |

== Other awards ==
| Award | Song or album (if available) | Recipient |
|---|---|---|
| Best prospect female award (最有前途新人獎 女新人) | - | (gold) Janice Vidal (silver) Ivana Wong (bronze) Niki Chow |
| Best prospect male award (最有前途新人獎 男新人) | - | (gold) Justin Lo (silver) Soler (bronze) Kenny Kwan |
| Best prospect exceptional award (最有前途新人獎 優異獎) | - | (gold) Charles Ying (silver) Gia Lin (林苑) (bronze) Kay Tse |
| Best national song award (全國最受歡迎歌曲) | 再說一次我愛你 夕陽無限好 童話 | (gold) Andy Lau, Kim Heon Jick (silver) Eason Chan, Eric Kwok, Albert Leung (bronze) Michael Wong |
| Most improved award (全年最佳進步獎) | - | Denise Ho |
| CASH national best song lyrics award (CASH全球華語歌曲最佳新進作詞人獎) | 無能為力 | Hins Cheung |
| CASH national best song composition award (CASH全球華語歌曲最佳新進作曲人獎) | 漢城沉沒了 | Endy Chow |
| Best national group (全國最受歡迎組合) | - | (gold) Twins (silver) Tat Ming Pair (bronze) S.H.E |
| Best national male artist (全國最受歡迎男歌手) | - | (gold) Andy Lau (silver) Eason Chan (bronze) Hacken Lee |
| Best national female artist (全國最受歡迎女歌手) | - | (gold) Joey Yung (silver) Stefanie Sun (bronze) Jolin Tsai |
| Sales award for male artists (全年最高銷量歌手大獎) | - | Hacken Lee |
| Sales award for female artist (全年最高銷量歌手大獎) | - | Joey Yung |
| International Chinese song award (全球華人至尊金曲獎) | 夕陽無限好 | Eric Kwok, Albert Leung, performed by Eason Chan |
| Outstanding female singer award (最優秀流行女歌手) | - | Joey Yung |
| Outstanding male singer award (最優秀流行男歌手) | - | Eason Chan |
| Four channel award (四台聯頒大獎) | - | Eason Chan |
