= Hins Cheung discography =

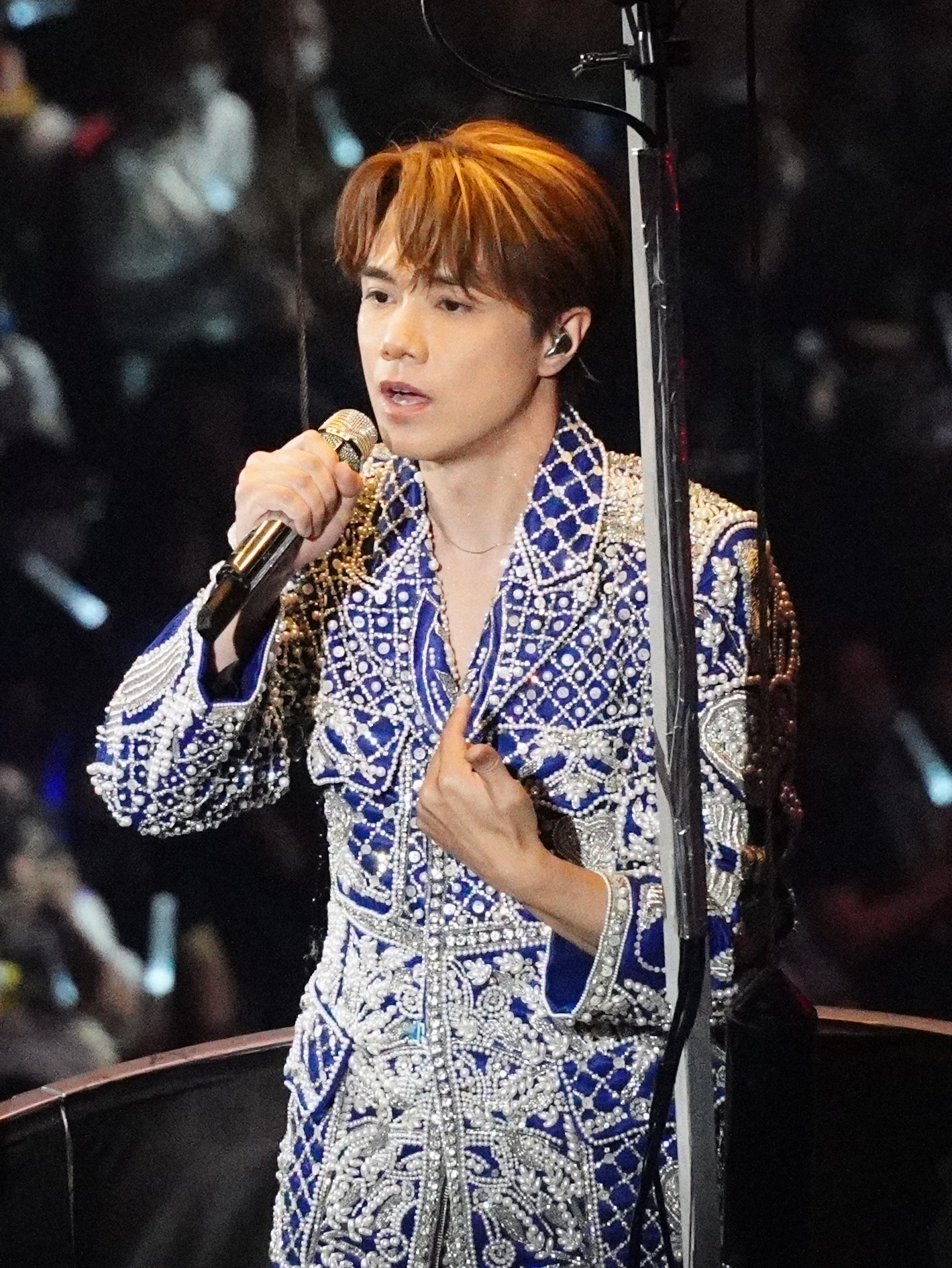
- Cheung in 2022
- Studio albums: 12
- EPs: 5
- Live albums: 3
- Compilation albums: 2
- Cover albums: 2

This is the discography of Chinese and Hong Kong singer Hins Cheung (Chinese: 張敬軒). Cheung has released twelve studio albums, five extended plays, and multiple compilation and live albums.

== Albums ==
=== Studio albums ===
List of studio albums, showing details, sales figures, and certifications
Title	Album details	Peak chart positions	Sales	Certifications
Title	Album details	HK	Sales	Certifications
Hins My Way	Released: August 28, 2002; Label: Universal Music Hong Kong; Format: CD, digital download	—	CHN: 600,000; HK: 150,000	IFPI HK: 3× Platinum
A.M./P.M.	Released: November 12, 2004; Label: Universal Music Hong Kong; Format: CD, digital download	—		
Spring, Summer, Autumn, Winter	Released: March 23, 2006; Label: Universal Music Hong Kong; Format: CD, digital download	—		
The Book of Laughter and Forgetting	Released: October 20, 2006; Label: Universal Music Hong Kong; Format: CD, digital download	—		
Ardently Love	Released: August 16, 2007; Label: Universal Music Hong Kong; Format: CD, digital download	—	HK: 30,000	IFPI HK: Platinum
Urban Emotions	Released: July 11, 2008; Label: Universal Music Hong Kong; Format: CD, digital download	—	HK: 15,000	IFPI HK: Gold
Love & Living	Released: April 9, 2009; Label: Universal Music Hong Kong; Format: CD, digital download	—		
No. Eleven	Released: April 16, 2010; Label: Universal Music Hong Kong; Format: CD, digital download	1		
Morph	Released: October 16, 2014; Label: EEG Music; Format: CD, digital download	1		IFPI HK: Platinum
Felix - Me & Mr. Cheung	Released: December 17, 2015; Label: EEG Music; Format: CD, digital download	1		
Senses Inherited	Released: March 22, 2019; Label: EEG Music; Format: CD, digital download	1		
The Brightest Darkness	Released: January 7, 2021; Label: Fitto Records; Format: CD, digital download	1		

=== Live albums ===
Title	Album details	Peak chart positions	Sales	Certifications
Title	Album details	HK	Sales	Certifications
Love Hins Cheung Concert (酷爱张敬轩演唱会)	Released: December 28, 2007; Label: Universal Music Hong Kong; Format: CD, digital download	—	HK: 30,000	IFPI HK: Platinum
Hins Live in Passion 2014	Released: December 23, 2014; Label: EEG Music; Format: CD, digital download	—		IFPI HK: 2× Platinum
The Next 20 Hins Live in Hong Kong	Released: January 18, 2023; Label: Fitto Records; Format: CD, digital download	1		

=== Compilation albums ===
Title	Album details	Peak chart positions	Sales	Certifications
Title	Album details	HK	Sales	Certifications
My 1st Collection	Released: December 28, 2007; Label: Universal Music Hong Kong; Format: CD, digital download	—	HK: 60,000	IFPI HK: 2× Platinum
P.S. I Love You	Released: April 15, 2011; Label: Universal Music Hong Kong; Format: CD, digital download	1		
It's Time... (是時候...)	Released: December 20, 2013; Label: Universal Music Hong Kong; Format: CD, digital download	6		

=== Cover albums ===
Title	Album details	Peak chart positions
Title	Album details	HK
Pink Dahlia	Released: February 25, 2013; Label: Universal Music Hong Kong; Format: CD, digital download	1
Dahlia II	Released: May 28, 2018; Label: EEG Music; Format: CD, digital download	1

== Extended plays ==
List of extended plays
Title	Album details	Peak chart positions	Sales
Title	Album details	HK	Sales
Hins' First	Released: August 3, 2001; Label: Universal Music Hong Kong; Format: CD, digital download	—	HK: 20,000
Park of Loneliness	Released: April 24, 2004; Label: Universal Music Hong Kong; Format: CD, digital download	—	
Why Not?	Released: July 27, 2012; Label: Universal Music Hong Kong; Format: CD, digital download	—	
Vibes	Released: October 6, 2016; Label: EEG Music; Format: CD, digital download	1	
The Whimsical Voyage	Released: February 10, 2017; Label: EEG Music; Format: CD, digital download	2	
