= 2006 RTHK Top 10 Gold Songs Awards =

Hong Kong music awards ceremony

The 29th RTHK Top 10 Gold Songs Awards (Chinese: 第二十九屆十大中文金曲頒獎音樂會) was held in 2007 for the 2006 music season.

== Top 10 song awards ==
The top 10 songs (十大中文金曲) of 2007 are as follows.

| Song name in Chinese | Artist | Composer | Lyricist |
|---|---|---|---|
| 華麗邂逅 | Joey Yung | Eric Kwok | Wyman Wong |
| 愛得太遲 | Leo Ku | Yeung zan-bong (楊鎮邦) | Albert Leung |
| 紅綠燈 | Stephanie Cheng | Alan Cheung Ka Shing (張家誠) | Keith Chan Siu-kei |
| 情歌 | Justin Lo | Mark Lui | Albert Leung |
| 感應 | Vincy Chan | Ling wai-man (凌偉文), Suen wai-gwun (孫維君) | Jau si-hung (游思行) |
| 最佳損友 | Eason Chan | Eric Kwok | Wyman Wong |
| 幼稚園 | Twins | Chan Kwong-Wing | Wyman Wong |
| 天水圍城 | Hacken Lee | Edmond Tsang | Albert Leung |
| 心亂如麻 | Janice Vidal | Mark Lui | Albert Leung |
| 累鬥累 | Andy Lau | Jone Chui (徐繼宗) | Andy Lau |

== Other awards ==
| Award | Song or album (if available) | Recipient |
|---|---|---|
| Best prospect award (最有前途新人獎) | - | (gold) Vincy Chan (silver) Jill Vidal (bronze) Kelvin Kwan (exceptional) Fahrenheit, Sunboy'z, Zarahn |
| Excellent Mandarin song award (優秀流行國語歌曲獎) | 約定 | Michael Wong |
| Best national song award (全國最受歡迎中文歌曲) | 千里之外 | Vincent Fang, performed by Fei Yu-Ching, Jay Chou |
| Best national male artist (全國最受歡迎男歌手) | - | Andy Lau |
| Best national female artist (全國最受歡迎女歌手) | - | Joey Yung |
| Best national group (全國最受歡迎組合) | - | Twins |
| CASH best composer singer award (CASH最佳創作歌手獎) | - | Ivana Wong |
| Most improved award (全年最佳進步獎) | - | Hins Cheung |
| Sales award for male artists (全年最高銷量歌手大獎) | - | Hacken Lee |
| Sales award for female artist (全年最高銷量歌手大獎) | - | Joey Yung |
| Outstanding female singer award (最優秀女歌手獎大獎) | - | Joey Yung |
| Outstanding male singer award (最優秀男歌手獎大獎) | - | Eason Chan |
| International Chinese song award (全球華人至尊金曲獎) | 愛得太遲 | Yeung zan-bong (楊鎮邦), Albert Leung, performed by Leo Ku |
| Four channel award (四台聯頒大獎) | - | Leo Ku |
| RTHK Golden needle award (金針獎) | - | Adam Cheng |
