= 2007 RTHK Top 10 Gold Songs Awards =

Hong Kong music awards ceremony

The 30th RTHK Top 10 Gold Songs Awards (Chinese: 第三十屆十大中文金曲頒獎音樂會) was held on January 19, 2008 at the Hong Kong Coliseum for the 2007 music season.

== Top 10 song awards ==
The top 10 songs (十大中文金曲) of 2008 are as follows.

Song name in Chinese	Artist	Composer	Lyricist
富士山下	Eason Chan	Christopher Chak	Albert Leung
花落誰家	Hacken Lee	Eric Kwok	Riley Lam (林若寧)
愛回家	Leo Ku	Dick Lee	Albert Leung
愛一個上一課	Joey Yung	Pong Nan	Albert Leung
化	Miriam Yeung	A Kwan (阿滾)	Albert Leung
酷愛	Hins Cheung	Vincent Chow	Albert Leung
逼得太緊	Kary Ng	Dennie Wong (黃丹儀)	Albert Leung
男人KTV	Justin Lo	Anson Hu, Philip Yin (殷文琦), Choi Jing-fan (蔡政勳)	Albert Leung, Zan gin-koeng (甄健強), Ho kai-wang (何啟弘)
電燈膽	Stephy Tang	Joe Lei (李峻一)	Joe Lei (李峻一)
思前戀後	Eric Suen (孫耀威)	Tse Kwok Wai, Victor (謝國維)	Albert Leung

== Other awards ==
Award	Song or album (if available)	Recipient
Best prospect award (最有前途新人獎)	-	(gold) Jason Chan (silver) Pakho Chau (bronze) Ken Hung (exceptional) Sherman Chung, Elanne Kwong, Terence Siufay
Excellent Mandarin song award (優秀流行國語歌曲獎)	不能說的秘密	Jay Chou
Outstanding singer award (優秀流行歌手大獎)	-	Eason Chan, Joey Yung, Twins, Hins Cheung, Justin Lo, Janice Vidal, Miriam Yeung, Leo Ku, Hacken Lee, Andy Lau
Outstanding female singer award (最優秀女歌手獎)	-	Joey Yung
Outstanding male singer award (最優秀男歌手獎)	-	Eason Chan
CASH best composer singer award (CASH最佳創作歌手獎)	-	Ivana Wong
Most improved award (全年最佳進步獎)	-	Stephanie Cheng
Best national male artist (全國最佳歌手獎)	-	Andy Lau
Best national female artist (全國最佳歌手獎)	-	Joey Yung
Best national group (全國最佳歌手獎)	-	Twins
Best Chinese song award (全國最佳中文歌曲獎)	富士山下	Eason Chan
International Chinese award (全球華人至尊金曲獎)	富士山下	Eason Chan
Sales award for male artists (全年最高銷量歌手大獎)	-	Eason Chan
Sales award for female artist (全年最高銷量歌手大獎)	-	Joey Yung
Sales award for group (全年最高銷量歌手大獎)	-	Twins
Four channel award (四台聯頒大獎)	富士山下	Eason Chan
RTHK Golden needle award (金針獎)	-	Teresa Carpio
