= 2008 RTHK Top 10 Gold Songs Awards =

Hong Kong music awards ceremony

The 31st RTHK Top 10 Gold Songs Awards (Chinese: 第三十一屆十大中文金曲得獎) was held on January 18, 2009 for the 2008 music season.

== Top 10 song awards ==
The top 10 songs (十大中文金曲) of 2008 are as follows.

Song name in Chinese	Artist	Composer	Lyricist
陪我長大	Joey Yung	Chan Kwong-Wing	Albert Leung
囍帖街	Kay Tse	Eric Kwok	Wyman Wong
一事無成	Stephanie Cheng, Pakho Chau	Chan Kwong-Wing	Wyman Wong
撈月亮的人	Miriam Yeung	Taz Tan	Riley Lam
I Miss You	Jason Chan	Chan Kwong-Wing	Fiona Fung
全民皆估	Fama	DJ Tommy	Fama
櫻花樹下	Hins Cheung	Ng Cheuk Yin	Riley Lam
愛不疚	Raymond Lam	Tang Chi Wai	Sandy Cheung Mei Yin
分手要狠	Kary Ng	Andrew Chu	Fong git
眼睛不能沒眼淚	Leo Ku	林建華	Albert Leung

== Other awards ==
Award	Song or album (if available)	Recipient
Best prospect award (最有前途新人獎)	-	(gold) William Chan (silver) G.E.M. (bronze) Wong Cho Lam (exceptional) Linda Chung, Jam Hsiao, Myolie Wu
Excellent Mandarin song award (優秀流行國語歌曲獎)	喜歡一個人好累	Vincy Chan, 小涼, 姜憶萱
-	路...一直都在	Eason Chan, Adrian Fu, 吳向飛
Outstanding singer award (優秀流行歌手大獎)	-	Hacken Lee, Miriam Yeung, Ivana Wong, Leo Ku, Hins Cheung, Joey Yung, Andy Lau, Justin Lo, Kay Tse
Outstanding female singer award (最優秀流行女歌手獎)	-	Joey Yung
Outstanding male singer award (最優秀流行男歌手獎)	-	Eason Chan
CASH best composer singer award (CASH最佳創作歌手獎)	-	Khalil Fong
Most improved award (全年最佳進步獎)	-	EO2
Sales award for male artists (全年最高銷量歌手大獎)	-	Eason Chan
Sales award for female artist (全年最高銷量歌手大獎)	-	Joey Yung
Sales award for group (全年最高銷量歌手大獎)	-	Fahrenheit
Best national male artist (全國最佳歌手獎)	-	Eason Chan
Best national female artist (全國最佳歌手獎)	-	Joey Yung
Best national female group (全國最佳歌手獎)	-	S.H.E
Best Chinese song award (全國最佳中文歌曲獎)	小酒窩	JJ Lin, Charlene Choi, 王雅君
International Chinese award (全球華人至尊金曲獎)	囍帖街	Kay Tse, Eric Kwok, Wyman Wong
Four channel award (四台聯頒大獎)	-	Eric Kwok, Wyman Wong, Kay Tse
RTHK Golden needle award (金針獎)	-	Albert Leung
