= 1999 RTHK Top 10 Gold Songs Awards =

Hong Kong music awards ceremony

The 1999 RTHK Top 10 Gold Songs Awards (Chinese: 第二十二屆十大中文金曲頒獎音樂會) was held in 2000 for the 1999 music season.

== Top 10 song awards ==
The top 10 songs (十大中文金曲) was expanded to top 13.

Song name in Chinese	Artist	Composer	Lyricist
每一個明天	Eason Chan	Lau cung-gat (柳重吉)	Richard Lam
對你太在乎	Kelly Chen	Eddie Ng Kwok King	Albert Leung
真心真意	Andy Hui	Eddie Ng Kwok King	Canny Leung
木魚與金魚	Andy Lau	Tsui ga-leong (徐嘉良)	Preston Lee (李安修) Chan fu-wing (陳富榮)
抬起我的頭來	Miriam Yeung	Chan Fai-young	Albert Leung
非走不可	Nicholas Tse	Ronald Ng (伍樂城)	Albert Leung
償還	Faye Wong	Lau cung-gat (柳重吉)	Albert Leung
遊園驚夢	Aaron Kwok	Davy Tam (譚國政)	Siu mei (小美)
插曲	Sammi Cheng	C.Y.Kong	Yan kwai (因葵)
教我如何不愛他	Andy Hui Deanie Ip	Mark Lui	Albert Leung
眼睛想旅行	Leon Lai	Mark Lui	Albert Leung
左右手	Leslie Cheung	Jimmy Ye	Albert Leung
有個人	Jacky Cheung	Eric Kwok	Keith Chan (陳少琪)

== Other awards ==
The top 10 outstanding artist was also extended to 11 artists.

Award	Song or album (if available)	Recipient
Top 10 outstanding artists award (十大優秀流行歌手大獎)	–	Faye Wong, Andy Hui, Eason Chan, Aaron Kwok, Kelly Chen, Jacky Cheung, William So, Sammi Cheng, Andy Lau, Nicholas Tse, Leon Lai
Best commercial song award (最佳中文廣告歌曲獎)	-	(gold) Danny Chan, Cheng Kwok Kong (鄭國江) (silver) J. Jackson, Siu mei (小美) (bronze) Duck Lau (劉祖德), Andy Lau
Best karaoke song award (最愛歡迎卡拉ok歌曲獎)	插曲	Sammi Cheng
Best new male prospect award (最有前途新人獎)	–	(gold) Leehom Wang (silver) David Tao (bronze) Peter Ho
Best new female prospect award (最有前途新人獎)	–	(gold) Cecilia Cheung (silver) Joey Yung (bronze) Ruby Lin
Best C-pop song award (最佳中文流行歌曲獎)	郵差	Adrian Chan
Best C-pop lyrics award (最佳中文流行歌詞獎)	陰天	Ruby Lin
Best original creation song award (最佳原創歌曲獎)	天氣會變	Leo Ku
Best revision song award (最佳改編歌曲獎)	未知	Joey Yung
Outstanding Mandarin song award (優秀國語歌曲獎)	木魚與金魚 許願 有一個姑娘	(gold) Andy Lau (silver) Leo Ku, Gigi Leung (bronze) Vicky Zhao
Sales award (全年最高銷量歌手大獎)	–	(gold) Andy Lau (silver) Sammi Cheng (bronze) Andy Hui
Sales award (全年銷量冠軍大獎)	有個人	Jacky Cheung
Leap award for male singer (飛躍大獎)	–	(gold) Nicholas Tse (silver) Andy Hui (bronze) Eason Chan
Leap award for female singer (飛躍大獎)	–	(gold) Kelly Chen (silver) Cecilia Cheung (bronze) Miriam Yeung
International Chinese award (全球華人至尊金曲)	渴望無限Ask For More	Aaron Kwok
International most popular Chinese award (全球華人最受歡迎歌手獎)	–	Andy Lau Faye Wong
Four channel award (四台聯頒獎項)	–	Andy Lau, Eric Kwok, Albert Leung
RTHK Golden needle award (金針獎)	–	Leslie Cheung
