= Michael Lai (composer) =

Hong Kong musician (1946–2019)

- 黎小田
- Pronunciation: lai4 siu2 tin4
- Born: 8 November 1946; British Hong Kong
- Died: 1 December 2019 (aged 73); St.Paul Hospital, Causeway Bay, Hong Kong
- Occupations: Composer; music producer; actor
- Known for: Cantopop
- Spouse: Susanna Kwan (m. 1982; div. 1984)

Michael Lai Siu-tin (Chinese: 黎小田; Jyutping: lai4 siu2 tin4; 8 November 1946 – 1 December 2019) was a Hong Kong music composer, record producer and actor.

Lai was born in 1946 in British Hong Kong to the composer Lai Cho-tin and his literary critic wife, and he later became friends with Cantopop band leader Joseph Koo. Lai attended La Salle College.

Lai first appeared on the music scene in the 1950s, but would also make a number of small but notable appearances as a film actor from the 1950s to 1990s.

== Life and career ==
Lai was born in 1946 in British Hong Kong. His father, Lai Cho-tin, was a music director, and his mother was a literary critic. He first worked in the entertainment industry as a child actor, making his first appearance in Juvenile (1953). Lai attended La Salle College.

=== Entry into music with Rediffusion Television ===
As a teenager who wanted to explore pop music, Lai joined a band performing in a nightclub, where he first met Joseph Koo. In 1973, he entered a songwriting contest hosted by TVB, coming in third place behind Koo and James Wong Jim. By 1975, Lai had become the music director for Rediffusion Television. That year, he gained popularity as the co-host of the variety show, Nancy & Michael (Chinese: 家燕與小田; Jyutping: gaa1 jin3 jyu5 siu2 tin4), sharing hosting duties with actress Nancy Sit.

During his time at Rediffusion, Lai worked on various theme songs for the channel's television dramas. With lyricist Jimmy Lo, who started working at the television station in 1978, Lai composed many theme songs that placed in the RTHK Top 10 Gold Songs Awards during the late 70s and early 80s. The theme song for the 1979 television series Reincarnated placed in the top 10 of the Gold Songs Awards of that year. The following year, three compositions by Lai and Lo appeared in the top 10 of the 1980 Gold Songs Awards: "Tear Drops on a Journey" (Chinese: 人在旅途洒淚時; Jyutping: jan4 zoi6 leoi5 tou4 saa2 leoi6 si4), "Decrepit Dream" (Chinese: 殘夢; Jyutping: caan4 mung6), and "Drama of Life" (Chinese: 戲劇人生; Jyutping: hei3 kek6 jan4 saang7). In addition, the Lai-composed song "Unable to Find an Excuse", from the series Hong Kong Gentlemen, won Jimmy Lo the inaugural Best Lyrics Award at the 1981 Gold Songs Awards.

=== Move to Capital Artists ===
In 1982, Lai began working for the Capital Artists record label, a subsidiary of TVB. In this position, he played a significant part in helping Cantopop singers achieve success in the industry. Lai produced Leslie Cheung's second Cantonese album, Wind Blows On, which propelled the singer to newfound popularity and was certified gold by the International Federation of the Phonographic Industry. He also helped organise the New Talent Singing Awards, which helped scout talent like Anita Mui, the winner of its inaugural year in 1982. Lai composed some of Mui's songs, such as "Fiery Tango" (Chinese: 似火探戈), from the 1987 platinum-selling album of the same name.

In addition to working with singers and television series, Lai also composed works for films. He won Best Original Film Score and Best Original Film Song at the 1989 Hong Kong Film Awards for Rouge (1988), which featured both Cheung and Mui. Throughout his career, Lai has been credited with 30 original musical scores for Hong Kong films from the 1970s to 1990s, as well as 700 original songs.

Lai received a Hall of Fame Award from the Composers and Authors Society of Hong Kong in 2006.

== Personal life ==
Lai was married to Susanna Kwan from 1982 to 1984.

Lai died on 1 December 2019, in St. Paul's Hospital due to lung cancer. He was survived by his son from a former relationship.

== Musicianship and composition style ==
Lai often start songs with simple melody and a natural flow. He also likes to set a 7-chord repertoire, then set a key change at the final chorus. His preferred instrument for composition is piano.

While most of his songs are slow ballads, but mostly experimented with songs with traditional Chinese instruments, but doesn't use as many pentatonic scale like James Wong Jim did.

== Works ==
=== Film ===
- Project A (1983)
- Police Story (1985)
- Armour of God (1986)
- Project A Part II (1987)
- Police Story 2 (1988)
- Miracles (1989)
