= 1996 RTHK Top 10 Gold Songs Awards =

Hong Kong music awards ceremony

The 1996 RTHK Top 10 Gold Songs Awards (Chinese: 第十九屆十大中文金曲頒獎音樂會) was held in 1997 for the 1996 music season.

== Top 10 song awards ==
The top 10 songs (十大中文金曲) of 1996 are as follows.

Song name in Chinese	Artist	Composer	Lyricist
情深說話未曾講	Leon Lai	Mark Lui	Calvin Poon Yuen Leung (潘源良)
彷如隔世	Cass Phang	Phil Chang Ho kai-wang (何啟弘)	Albert Leung
放不低	Sammi Cheng	Fung Wing Ki, Vicky (馮穎琪)	Erica Li (李敏)
友情歲月	Ekin Cheng	Chan Kwong-Wing	Gene Lau (劉卓輝)
感冒	Karen Tong (湯寶如)	Robert Seng	Albert Leung
情未鳥	Andy Lau	Lowell Lo	Thomas Chow (周禮茂)
風花雪	Kelly Chen	Mark Lui	Thomas Chow (周禮茂)
最激帝國	Aaron Kwok	Conrad Wong (黃尚偉)	Richard Lam
你的名字，我的姓氏	Jacky Cheung	Lee Shih Shiong	Albert Leung
男人最痛	Andy Hui	Huang Kuo-lun (黃國倫)	Thomas Chow (周禮茂)

== Other awards ==
Award	Song or album (if available)	Recipient
Top 10 outstanding artists award (十大優秀流行歌手大獎)	–	Aaron Kwok, Jacky Cheung, Leon Lai, Ekin Cheng, Andy Lau, Priscilla Chan, Sammi Cheng, Cass Phang, Amanda Lee, Faye Wong
Best new prospect award (最有前途新人獎)	–	(gold) (silver) Gigi Leung (bronze) Ronald Cheng (Exceptional award) Josie Ho, Miriam Yeung, Mavis Fan
Best C-pop song award (最佳中文流行歌曲獎)	我為我生存	Tam Zin-fai (譚展輝)
Best C-pop lyrics award (最佳中文流行歌詞獎)	男人最痛	Thomas Chow (周禮茂)
Best original creation song award (最佳原創歌曲獎)	每日一禁果	Tat Ming Pair
Best revision song award (最佳改編歌曲獎)	曖昧	Faye Wong
Outstanding Mandarin song award (優秀國語歌曲獎)	(gold) 情書 (silver) 相思成災 (bronze) 思念誰	Jacky Cheung Andy Lau Eric Moo
Sales award (全年最高銷量歌手大獎)	–	Jacky Cheung, Sammi Cheng, Leon Lai, Andy Lau, Ekin Cheng Jacky Cheung, Sammi Cheng, Andy Lau (Top 3)
Sales champion award (全年最高銷量冠軍歌手大獎)	愛與交響曲	Jacky Cheung
Leap award (飛躍大獎)	–	Aaron Kwok, Sammi Cheng
International Chinese award (全球華人至尊金曲)	情深說話未曾講	Leon Lai
Four channel award (四台聯頒獎項)	風花雪	Kelly Chen
RTHK Golden needle award (金針獎)	–	Alan Tam
