= 1984 Jade Solid Gold Best Ten Music Awards Presentation =

Hong Kong music awards ceremony

The 1984 Jade Solid Gold Best Ten Music Awards Presentation (Chinese: 1984年度十大勁歌金曲頒獎典禮) was held in January 1985. It is part of the Jade Solid Gold Best Ten Music Awards Presentation series held in Hong Kong.

== Top 10 song awards ==
The top 10 songs (十大勁歌金曲) of 1984 are as follows.

| Song name in Chinese | Artist(s) |
|---|---|
| 零時十分 | Sally Yeh |
| 愛在深秋 | Alan Tam |
| 似水流年 | Anita Mui |
| 天籟 | Michael Kwan |
| 再度孤獨 | Jenny Tseng |
| 無敵是愛 | Samuel Hui, Jenny Tseng |
| 偶遇 | Samantha Lam |
| Monica | Leslie Cheung |
| 愛的根源 | Alan Tam |
| 幻影 | Alan Tam |

== Additional awards ==
| Award | Song name (if available for award) | Recipient(s) |
|---|---|---|
| The Best Composition Award (最佳作曲獎) | 愛的根源 | Composer: Philip Chan Fei Lap (陳斐立); Performed by: Alan Tam |
| The Best Lyric Award (最佳填詞獎) | 愛在深秋 | Lyrics by: Andrew Lam (林敏驄); Performed by: Alan Tam |
| The Best Music Arrangement Award (最佳編曲獎) | 愛的根源 | Music Arrangement by: Antonio Arevalo Jr. (盧東尼); Performed by: Alan Tam |
| The Best Record Album Produced Award (最佳唱片監製獎) | 愛的根源 | Music Producer by: William Kwan (關維麟); Performed by: Alan Tam |
| The Most Popular Male Artist Award (最受歡迎男歌星獎) | --- | Alan Tam |
| The Most Popular Female Artist Award (最受歡迎女歌星獎) | --- | Jenny Tseng |
| Gold Song Gold Award (金曲金獎) | 愛在深秋 | Alan Tam |
| Jade Solid Gold Honour Award (勁歌金曲榮譽大獎) | --- | Paula Tsui |
