= 2009 RTHK Top 10 Gold Songs Awards =

Hong Kong music awards ceremony

The 32nd RTHK Top 10 Gold Songs Awards (Chinese: 第三十二屆十大中文金曲頒獎音樂會) was held on January 30, 2010 for the 2009 music season. This marks the second time the Golden needle award was given to someone who is deceased, Danny Chan, with the first being Tang Ti-sheng in 1986.

== Top 10 song awards ==
The top 10 songs (十大中文金曲) of 2009 are as follows.

Song name in Chinese	Artist	Composer	Lyricist
搜神記	Joey Yung	Christopher Chak	Albert Leung
七百年後	Eason Chan	Jim Lau	Riley Lam
你瞞我瞞	Jason Chan	Chan Kwong-Wing	Albert Leung
我的回憶不是我的	Ocean Hai, Vincy Chan	朱其民	Chow Yiu-fai
原來過得很快樂	Miriam Yeung	Harry Ng Chung Hang	Albert Leung
月亮說	Ivana Wong	Ivana Wong	Ivana Wong
就算世界無童話	Janice Vidal	Mark Lui	Albert Leung
年度之歌	Kay Tse	Christopher Chak	Wyman Wong
地球很危險	Leo Ku	John Laudon	Albert Leung
如果我是陳奕迅	Mr.	Alan Po	Dash, Siu Hak

== Other awards ==
Award	Song or album (if available)	Recipient
Best prospect award (最有前途新人獎)	-	(gold) Kate Tsui (silver) Hinson Chou (bronze) Jonathan Wong
Excellent Mandarin song award (優秀流行國語歌曲獎)	三人遊	Khalil Fong, Luke Tsui
Outstanding singer award (優秀流行歌手大獎)	-	Leo Ku, Ivana Wong, Joey Yung, Eason Chan, Hins Cheung, Kay Tse, Charlene Choi, Janice Vidal, G.E.M., Raymond Lam, Miriam Yeung, Khalil Fong, Mr.
Outstanding female singer award (最優秀女歌手獎)	-	Joey Yung
Outstanding male singer award (最優秀男歌手獎)	-	Eason Chan
CASH best composer singer award (CASH最佳創作歌手獎)	-	Justin Lo
Most improved award (全年最佳進步獎)	-	(gold) G.E.M. (silver) Sherman Chung (bronze) RubberBand
Sales award for male artists (全年最高銷量歌手大獎)	-	Eason Chan
Sales award for female artist (全年最高銷量歌手大獎)	-	Joey Yung
Sales award for group (全年最高銷量歌手大獎)	-	Mr.
Best national male artist (全國最佳歌手獎)	-	Eason Chan
Best national female artist (全國最佳歌手獎)	-	Joey Yung
Best national group (全國最佳歌手獎)	-	Sodagreen
Best Chinese song award (全國最佳中文歌曲獎)	Yes & No	Hins Cheung, Chow Yiu-fai
International Chinese award (全球華人至尊金曲獎)	七百年後	Eason Chan, Lau chung-yin (柳重言), Riley Lam (林若寧)
Four channel award (四台聯頒大獎)	-	Mark Lui, Jim Lau, Albert Leung, Joey Yung
RTHK Golden needle award (金針獎)	-	Danny Chan
