= 1984 RTHK Top 10 Gold Songs Awards =

Hong Kong music awards ceremony

The 1984 RTHK Top 10 Gold Songs Awards (Chinese: 1984年度十大中文金曲得獎) was held in 1984 for the 1983 music season.

== Top 10 song awards ==
The top 10 songs (十大中文金曲) of 1984 are as follows.

Song name in Chinese	Artist	Composer	Lyricist
Monica	Leslie Cheung (張國榮)	Nobody	Peter Lai (黎彼得)
偶遇	Samantha Lam (林志美)	Li Nga-song (李雅桑)	Zeng Gwok-gong (鄭國江)
似水流年	Anita Mui (梅豔芳)	Kitarō (喜多郎)	Zeng Gwok-gong (鄭國江)
酒干倘賣無	Julie Su (蘇芮)	Hau Dak-gin (侯德健)	Hau Dak-gin (侯德健)
愛的根源	Alan Tam (譚詠麟)	Chan Fei-lap (陳斐立)	Andrew Lam (林敏驄)
天籟	Michael Kwan (關正傑)	Lowell Lo (盧冠廷)	Kat Lung (卡龍)
摘星	Danny Chan (陳百強)	Joseph Koo (顧嘉煇)	Richard Lam (林振強)
再度孤獨	Jenny Tseng (甄妮)	Yi Tang-fan (伊藤薰)	Richard Lam (林振強)
愛在深秋	Alan Tam (譚詠麟)	Li Gou-zeon (李鎬俊)	Andrew Lam (林敏驄)
愛到發燒	George Lam (林子祥)	Reggie Andrews, Leon "Ndugu" Chancler ("Let It Whip")	Richard Lam (林振強)

== Other awards ==
Award	Song or album (if available)	Recipient
Best C-pop song award (最佳中文流行歌曲獎)	你留我在此	Chan Wing-loeng (陳永良)
Best C-pop lyrics award (最佳中文流行歌詞獎)	摘星	Richard Lam
Best record design award (最佳唱片封套設計獎)	Anita Mui Flying Across the Stage	Alan Chan (陳幼堅) Lau Pui-gei (劉培基)
Best record producer award (最佳唱片監製獎)	愛的根源	Gwaan Wai-leon (關維麟) Chu Seoi-ping (朱瑞萍)
Most Promising Newcomer Award (最有前途新人獎)	—	Priscilla Chan (陳慧嫻)
