= Joyce Lee =

Hong Kong Canadian singer

- Born: October 26, 1973 (age 52); Edmonton, Canada
- Education: Ho Man Tin Government Secondary School; The Royal Conservatory of Music
- Occupation: Singer
- Musical career
- Genres: Pop; Cantopop
- Labels: Golden Pony (1992–1993); Fitto Record (1994–1996); Go East (1996–1998); Wow Music (2005); Different Music (2006)

Chinese name
- Traditional Chinese: 李樂詩
- Simplified Chinese: 李乐诗
Transcriptions
Standard Mandarin
- Hanyu Pinyin: Lǐ Lèshī
Yue: Cantonese
- Jyutping: Lei^{5} Lok^{6}-si^{1}

Joyce Lee Lok-sze (Chinese: 李樂詩) is a Hong Kong Canadian singer and songwriter best known for her Cantopop songs including "Beloved", "Love Your Life Without Regrets" (Chan Ching Sai Syut) in the Hong Kong drama A Kindred Spirit, and her performance of the Chinese national anthem at Canada Day in Hong Kong.

Lee has received "Top Ten Golden Melody Award" at the Hong Kong 1994 Jade Solid Gold Best Ten Music Awards, Hong Kong CASH and RTHK "Best Original Song Award", and Bronze Award for the Most Popular Singer-Songwriter at the Top Ten Strong Songs Golden Melody Awards Ceremony, among others.

== Early life and education ==
Joyce Lee was born in Edmonton, Canada. She attended and graduated from the Royal Conservatory of Music in Toronto, Canada.

In 1991, Lee was a contestant in a Chinese talent concert in Toronto, she was scouted for a recording deal with interest from the record companies but her Cantonese language singing needed improvement for entering the Canto-pop market. To improve her Cantonese, she watched Chinese television shows and a label also interested in her classical piano training signed her at 17 years old. She recorded her first album, and received the best new female award from a local radio station.

In 1992, Lee participated in the musical "Superstar of All Ages" at the Hong Kong Academy for Performing Arts, playing the role of the heroine Mary Magdalene.

== Career ==
In 1992, Lee released her first solo album "Lee Loksze" on Golden Pony Records, Hong Kong. "Love is Forever" was issued as the first single, for which she received Best Newcomer Award of New Town Radio FM Select. "Love is Forever" received radio airplay throughout the year.

In 1993, Lee's follow up album "Beloved" reached No.1 on Hong Kong radio charts. The song "Wei You Jin Ye" and its English version "Back Again" won the title "Top 10 in Hong Kong CASH Pop Song Composition Competition".

In 1994, Lee released her third solo album "Gan Dong Ni", with the hit song "Zong You Yi Tian Gan Dong Ni" that she also wrote. She attended many award shows where the song received multiple awards including the Jade Solid Gold Best 10 Awards Presentation's Top 10 Songs of the Year, Hong Kong CASH & 1994 RTHK Top 10 Gold Songs Awards and one of the five most played songs in Hong Kong from Commercial Radio Hong Kong.

In 1995, Joyce began studying Mandarin with a view to appealing to the China and Taiwan audiences.

In 2005, after 6 years not releasing any music, Lee returned with the album "Fantasy".

In 2006, her break up with Orlando To was the inspiration for two new songs "Yi Lai Ta De" and "Si Yi".

Lee attended numerous CASH Golden Sail Music Awards.

=== Love Your Life Without Regrets tv drama theme song ===
In 1995, Lee performed the theme song "Love Your Life Without Regrets" (Chan Ching Sai Syut) for the TVB Jade Hong Kong drama A Kindred Spirit. The series was broadcast from 1995 to 1999, with a total of 1,128 episodes. The song was written by lyricist Huang Zhan and composer Gu Jiahui.

=== Canada Day and live performances ===
In Hong Kong, at the 2015 celebration of Canada Day hosted by Consul General Ian Burchett, Joyce Lee performed the national anthems of both China and Canada, along with her own songs and a cover of Michael Bublé's "It’s a Beautiful Day".

Lee is one of the Cantopop stars, including Aaron Kwok, Jackie Chung and expatriate Sally Yeh, performing in Canada on SRO tours. She was the opening act for Aaron Kwok on his North American tour including shows at Queen Elizabeth Theatre in Vancouver and Massey Hall in Toronto.

== Personal life ==
Lee is married to Ted Lee and has 3 sons. In May 2022, Vogue Magazine wrote a pictorial feature story on Lee and her husband's home, complementing her eclectic and personal style.

In August 2021, Lee was diagnosed with breast cancer and underwent a double mastectomy the same month. In November 2021, she began serving as the Hong Kong Breast Cancer Foundation ambassador urging people to take a step in fighting breast cancer and for women to undergo regular breast health checkups.
