= 1994 Jade Solid Gold Best Ten Music Awards Presentation =

Hong Kong music awards ceremony

The 1994 Jade Solid Gold Best Ten Music Awards Presentation (Chinese: 1994年度十大勁歌金曲頒獎典禮) was held in January 1995. It is part of the Jade Solid Gold Best Ten Music Awards Presentation series held in Hong Kong.

== Top 10 song awards ==
The top 10 songs (十大勁歌金曲) of 1994 are as follows:

Song name in Chinese	Artist
夢中人	Faye Wong
鐵幕誘惑	Aaron Kwok
讓我跟你走	Cass Phang
我等到花兒也謝了	Jacky Cheung
向全世界說愛你	Andy Hui
女人的弱點	Sally Yeh
終有一天感動你	Joyce Lee
繾綣星光下	Shirley Kwan
那有一天不想你	Leon Lai
誰人知	Andy Lau
心酸的情歌	Eric Moo
昨晚你已嫁給誰	Wakin Chau

== Additional awards ==
Award	Song name (if available for award)	Recipient(s)
The Best Duet Song Award ( 最受歡迎合唱歌曲獎)
Gold award	從不喜歡孤單一個	William So, Angela Pang (彭家麗)
Silver award	非一般愛火	Andy Hui, Sammi Cheng
Bronze award	愛情來的時候	Eric Moo, Charlie Yeung
The Most Popular Mandarin Song Award ( 最受歡迎國語歌曲獎 )
Gold award	忘情水	Andy Lau
Silver award	太傻	Eric Moo
Bronze award	用心良苦	Phil Chang
The Best Composition Award ( 最佳作曲獎 )	那有一天不想你	Music composers: Mahmood Rumjahn; Performed by: Leon Lai
The Best Lyric Award ( 最佳填詞獎 )	繾綣星光下	Lyrics by: Thomas Chow (周禮茂); Performed by: Shirley Kwan
The Best Music Arrangement Award ( 最佳編曲獎 )	昨晚你已嫁給誰	Music Arrangement by: Jimmy Chiang (江建民); Performed by: Wakin Chau
The Best Song Producer Award ( 最佳歌曲監製獎 )	繾綣星光下	Music producer: Joseph Ip (葉廣權); Performed by: Shirley Kwan
The Next Generation Performance Award, Male singer ( 新一代傑出表現獎, 男歌手 )
Gold award	---	Wakin Chau
Silver award	---	Ekin Cheng
Bronze award	---	Edmond Leung
The Next Generation Performance Award, Female singer ( 新一代傑出表現獎, 女歌手 )
Gold award	---	Cass Phang
Silver award	---	Vivian Chow
Bronze award	---	Sammi Cheng
The Best Music Video Award ( 最佳音樂錄影帶獎 )	怎麼天生不是女人	Director 導演 : Zeng Xian Zong, Tsang Hin Chung (曾憲宗), Performed by: Grasshopper (Band members: Calvin Choy, Remus Choy, Edmond So)
The Best Music Video Performance Award ( 最佳音樂錄影帶演出獎 )	希望	Hacken Lee
The Most Popular New Artist Award, Male singer ( 最受歡迎新人獎, 男歌手 )
Gold award	---	Leo Ku
Silver award	---	Gabriel Harrison (海俊傑)
Bronze award	---	Raymond Cho
The Most Popular New Artist Award, Female singer ( 最受歡迎新人獎, 女歌手 )
Gold award	---	Jacklyn Wu
Silver award	---	Alice Lau (劉雅麗)
Bronze award	---	Amanda Lee (李蕙敏)
Mainland's Most Popular Male Singer Award ( 國內最受歡迎香港男歌星獎 )	---	Jacky Cheung
Mainland's Most Popular Female Singer Award ( 國內最受歡迎香港女歌星獎 )	---	Faye Wong
The Most Popular Male Artist Award ( 最受歡迎男歌星獎 )	---	Andy Lau
The Most Popular Female Artist Award ( 最受歡迎女歌星獎 )	---	Faye Wong
Gold Song Gold Award ( 金曲金獎 )	那有一天不想你	Leon Lai
