= 1993 RTHK Top 10 Gold Songs Awards =

Hong Kong music awards ceremony

The 1993 RTHK Top 10 Gold Songs Awards (Chinese: 第十六屆十大中文金曲頒獎音樂會) was held in 1994 for the 1993 music season.

== Top 10 song awards ==
The top 10 songs (十大中文金曲) of 1993 are as follows.

Song name in Chinese	Artist	Composer	Lyricist
祇想一生跟你走	Jacky Cheung	Eric Moo Chan Kai-ming (陳啟明)	Gene Lau
獨自去偷歡	Andy Lau	Jamaster A	Thomas Chow
永遠寂寞	Andy Lau	Sada Masashi	Albert Leung
夏日傾情	Leon Lai	Takashi Miki Yasushi Akimoto	Jolland Chan Kim Wo
狂野之城	Aaron Kwok	Conrad Wong (黃尚偉)	Thomas Chow
等你回來	Jacky Cheung	Sky Wu Lau Yu-seoi (劉虞瑞)	Gan ning (簡寧)
執迷不悔 (Mandarin)	Faye Wong	Yuan Wei Jen	Faye Wong
海闊天空	Beyond	Wong Ka Kui	Wong Ka Kui
謝謝你的愛	Andy Lau	Hung Mei-ling (熊美玲)	Andy Lau
你是我今生唯一傳奇	Jacky Cheung	C.Lemos P. S. Valle	Thomas Chow

== Other awards ==
Award	Song or album (if available)	Recipient
Best commercial song award (最佳中文廣告歌曲獎 )	–	(gold) Terry Coffey, Lun Git-jing (倫潔瑩) (silver) Bruce Wooley, Lun Git-jing (倫潔瑩) (bronze) Gordon O'Yang (歐陽燊), Lei Siu-wei (李少蕙)
Best karaoke song award (最愛歡迎卡拉ok歌曲獎)	其實你心裡有沒有我	Andy Hui Sammi Cheng
Best new male prospect award (最有前途新人獎)	–	(gold) Nicky Wu (silver) Takeshi Kaneshiro (bronze) Kevin Cheng
Best new female prospect award (最有前途新人獎)	–	(gold) Linda Wong (silver) Gigi Lai (bronze) Rain Lau Yuk Chui
Best new group prospect award (最有前途新人獎)	–	(gold) L.A. Boyz (silver) NBC (New Boy Club)
Best record producer award (最佳唱片監製獎)	一天一點愛戀	Steve Chow
Best musical arrangements (最佳編曲獎)	不如從新開始	Chiu Tsang-hei
Best C-pop song award (最佳中文流行歌曲獎)	一人有一個夢想	Antonio Arevalo Jr.
Best C-pop lyrics award (最佳中文流行歌詞獎)	一人有一個夢想	Jolland Chan Kim Wo
Best original creation song award (最佳原創歌曲獎)	執迷不悔 (Mandarin)	Faye Wong
Memorial award (無休止符紀念獎)	–	Danny Chan
Outstanding Mandarin song award (優秀國語歌曲獎)	不能沒有你	Andy Lau
Sales award (全年銷量冠軍大獎)	我與你	Jacky Cheung
IFBI international award (IFPI國際歌手大獎)	吻別	Jacky Cheung
Best male singer (最佳男歌手)	–	Jacky Cheung
Best female singer (最佳女歌手)	–	Sally Yeh
