= Chan Fai-young =

Hong Kong Cantopop composer

- Born: September 25, 1970 (age 54); Macau
- Occupation: Composer
- Years active: 1995-Present

Chinese name
- Traditional Chinese: 陳輝陽
- Simplified Chinese: 陈辉阳
Transcriptions
Standard Mandarin
- Hanyu Pinyin: Chén Huīyáng
Yue: Cantonese
- Jyutping: Can^{4} Fai^{1} Joeng^{4}

Chan Fai-young (Chinese: 陳輝陽; born 25 September 1970) is a Hong Kong Cantopop composer. Chan was born in Macau in 1970. He attended Berklee College of Music, an American college in Boston, Massachusetts.

Chan composed his first work in 1994, "Romantic White Paper" (愛情白皮書), sung by Eric Suen Yiu-wai (孫耀威). He composed other songs, including ones alongside lyricist Lin Xi, sung by many singers. He and Lin Xi wrote "Ngaam Yung" (暗湧) for Faye Wong, released in 1997 as part of Wong's EP, Toy. Chan composed "Garbage" (垃圾) for Candy Lo, released in 1997 as part of Lo's debut EP, No Need... Perfection Is Awful (不需要...完美得可怕).

Chan and Lin Xi wrote "K goh chi wong" (K歌之王) for Eason Chan, released in September 2000, and "Prayer of a Young Woman" (少女的祈禱) for Miriam Yeung, for which both won as two of top ten Chinese gold songs (十大中文金曲) at the 2000 RTHK Top 10 Gold Songs Awards. Chan Fai-young composed other songs for Eason Chan, such as "Night Does Not Return" (黑夜不再來) and "Coming and Going" (人來人往), and for Miriam Yeung, such as "Lifting Up My Head" (抬起我的頭來), "Knowledge of Wine Drinking" (飲酒思源), and "Firebird" (火鳥).

Chan and Lin Xi also wrote "Beauty for Life" (終身美麗)—written for the 2001 film, Love on a Diet—and "Shall We Talk" in 2001 for, respectively, Sammi Cheng and Eason Chan. Chan and lyricist Wyman Wong wrote "Painful Love" (痛愛) for Joey Yung. These songs became three of the top ten Chinese gold songs at the 2001 RTHK Top 10 Gold Songs Awards. In 2002, "Beauty for Life" won the "Best Original Film Song" and earned Chan Fai-young the "Best Melody Award" at the CASH Golden Sail Music Awards. Chan composed other songs for Sammi Cheng, such as "Exchanging Tenderness" (交換溫柔), "Come Back to Me" (回來我身邊), "The Last Cry" (上一次流淚), and "How to Shed Tears" (如何掉眼淚). Chan composed other songs for Joey Yung, such as "Fear" (怯), "Tsaang Hei" (爭氣), and "Disfigured" (破相).

Chan composed "Vortex" (漩渦) for Cass Phang and Anthony Wong Yiu-ming, "Love Someone" (愛一個人) for Hacken Lee and Kelly Chen, "Day and Night" 日與夜 for Jacky Cheung and Sandy Lam, and "Loving Each Other Is Hard" (相愛很難) for Jacky Cheung and Anita Mui. He and Lin Xi wrote "Single Man" (怨男) for Leslie Cheung.

Chan and Lin Xi composed twelve songs for the 2007 album, 12 Faces of Women (12金釵眾生花), sung by various singers, including Sammi Cheng.
