= 1994 RTHK Top 10 Gold Songs Awards =

Hong Kong music awards ceremony

The 1994 RTHK Top 10 Gold Songs Awards (Chinese: 第十七屆十大中文金曲頒獎音樂會) was held in 1995 for the 1994 music season.

== Top 10 song awards ==
The top 10 songs (十大中文金曲) of 1994 are as follows.

Song name in Chinese	Artist	Composer	Lyricist
餓狼傳說	Jacky Cheung	John Laudon of Citybeat	Poon Wai Yuen
那有一天不想你	Leon Lai	Mahmood Rumjahn	Jolland Chan Kim Wo
女人的弱點	Sally Yeh	Chage & Aska	Calvin Poon Yuen Leung
心酸的情歌	Eric Moo	Eric Moo	Andy Lau
繾綣星光下	Shirley Kwan	JL Dabadie Lunghin	Thomas Chow
忘情水	Andy Lau	Chan Jiu-yun (陳耀川)	Preston Lee (李安修)
鐵幕誘惑	Aaron Kwok	Davy Tam	Siu mei (小美) Albert Leung
誰人知	Andy Lau	Cheung Ying-kwan (張影坤)	Albert Leung
冷戰	Faye Wong	Tori Amos	Albert Leung
來來回回	Jacky Cheung	Hirosh Sugma Mitsuyasu Tomohisa	Thomas Chow

== Other awards ==
Award	Song or album (if available)	Recipient
Top 10 outstanding artists award (十大優秀流行歌手大獎)	–	Aaron Kwok, Wakin Chau, Andy Lau, Jacky Cheung, Andy Hui, Cass Phang, Sally Yeh, Faye Wong, Hacken Lee, Leon Lai
Best new male prospect award (最有前途新人獎)	–	(gold) Leo Ku (silver) Eric Suen (bronze) Alec Su
Best new female prospect award (最有前途新人獎)	–	(gold) Jacklyn Wu (silver) Alice Lau Nga Lai (bronze) Amanda Lee
Best new group prospect award (最有前途新人獎)	–	(gold) Wind Sea Fire ft. Michael Tse, Jordan Chan (silver) Andrew Cheung & Peter Cheung (bronze) Girl Friends
Best record producer award (最佳唱片監製獎)	胡思亂想	Alvin Leong
Best C-pop song award (最佳中文流行歌曲獎)	終有一天感動你	Joyce Lee
Best C-pop lyrics award (最佳中文流行歌詞獎)	女人的弱點	Calvin Poon Yuen Leung
Best original creation song award (最佳原創歌曲獎)	昨晚你已嫁給誰	Wakin Chau
Outstanding Mandarin song award (優秀國語歌曲獎)	(gold) 忘情水 (silver) 祝福 (bronze)用心良苦	Andy Lau Jacky Cheung Phil Chang
Sales award (全年銷量冠軍大獎)	餓狼傳說	Jacky Cheung
International Chinese award (全球華人至尊金曲)	那有一天不想你	Leon Lai
Mass media singer award (傳媒歌手大獎)	–	Jacky Cheung
Mass media composer award (傳媒作曲人大獎)	–	Mahmood Rumjahn
Mass media lyricist award (傳媒作詞人之獎)	–	Thomas Chow
RTHK Golden needle award (金針獎)	–	George Lam
