= 1982 RTHK Top 10 Gold Songs Awards =

Hong Kong music awards ceremony

The 1982 RTHK Top 10 Gold Songs Awards (Chinese: 1982年度十大中文金曲得獎) was held in 1983 for the 1982 music season.

== Top 10 song awards ==
The top 10 songs (十大中文金曲) of 1982 are as follows.

Song name in Chinese	Artist	Composer	Lyricist
忘盡心中情	Johnny Yip (葉振棠)	Joseph Koo	Wong Jim
今晚夜	Elisa Chan (陳潔靈)	Joseph Koo	Wong Jim
雨絲‧情愁	Alan Tam	Mayumi Itsuwa	Jolland Chan Kim Wo
星星問	Paula Tsui	大塚博堂	Cheng Kwok Kong
我是中國人	Cheung Ming-man	Liu Chia-chang	Liu Chia-chang
萬水千山縱橫	Michael Kwan	Joseph Koo	Wong Jim
感情的段落	Samantha Lam	Dominic Chow	Cheng Kwok Kong
漣漪	Danny Chan	Danny Chan	Cheng Kwok Kong
兩忘煙水裡	Michael Kwan Susanna Kwan	Joseph Koo	Wong Jim
勇敢的中國人	Liza Wang	Joseph Koo	Wong Jim

== Other awards ==
Award	Song or album (if available)	Recipient
Best C-pop song award (最佳中文流行歌曲獎)	忘盡心中情	Joseph Koo
Best C-pop lyrics award (最佳中文流行歌詞獎)	兩忘煙水裡	Wong Jim
IFBI award (IFBI 大獎)	-	Michael Kwan
