= 2001 RTHK Top 10 Gold Songs Awards =

Hong Kong music awards ceremony

The 2001 RTHK Top 10 Gold Songs Awards (Chinese: 第二十四屆十大中文金曲頒獎音樂會) was held in 2002 for the 2001 music season.

== Top 10 song awards ==
The top 10 songs (十大中文金曲) of 2001 are as follows.

Song name in Chinese	Artist	Composer	Lyricist
爛泥	Andy Hui	Li yat-zeon (李一峻)	Li yat-zeon (李一峻)
終身美麗	Sammi Cheng	Chan Fai-young	Albert Leung
最愛演唱會	Kelly Chen	Ronald Ng (伍樂城)	Albert Leung
有病呻吟	Jacky Cheung	Lam gin-waa (林健華)	Albert Leung
夏日Fiesta	Andy Lau	CC To (杜自持)	Keith Chan (陳少琪)
Shall We Talk	Eason Chan	Chan Fai-young	Albert Leung
玉蝴蝶	Nicholas Tse	Nicholas Tse	Albert Leung
痛愛	Joey Yung	Chan Fai-young	Wyman Wong
Para Para Sakura	Aaron Kwok	Peter Kam	Keith Chan (陳少琪)
姊妹	Miriam Yeung	C.Y. Kong	Albert Leung

== Other awards ==
The top 10 outstanding artist was also extended to 15 artists.

Award	Song or album (if available)	Recipient
Top 10 outstanding artists award (十大優秀流行歌手大獎)	–	Sammi Cheng, Faye Wong, Andy Lau, Hacken Lee, Coco Lee, Eason Chan, Jay Chou, Andy Hui, Joey Yung, Kelly Chen, Miriam Yeung, Jacky Cheung, Nicholas Tse, Aaron Kwok
Best male karaoke song award (最愛歡迎卡拉ok歌曲獎)	Shall We Talk	Eason Chan, Chan Fai-young, Albert Leung
Best female karaoke song award (最愛歡迎卡拉ok歌曲獎)	隨身聽	Kelly Chen, Mark Lui, Kin Yan (甄健強)
Best group karaoke song award (最愛歡迎卡拉ok歌曲獎)	愛是	Sammi Cheng, LMF, Davy Chan, MC Yan, Wah, Phat, Kit
Best new male prospect award (最有前途新人獎)	–	(gold) Jay Chou (silver) Alex Fong, Victor Chen (陳司翰) (bronze) Roy Chow (周永恒)
Best new female prospect award (最有前途新人獎)	–	(gold) Twins (silver) Denise Ho (bronze) Bobo Chan
Exceptional prospect award (優異獎)	–	Maggie Fu (傅珮嘉), Mango Wong (王秀琳), Nicola Cheung
Best C-pop song award (最佳中文流行歌曲獎)	有病呻吟	Lam gin-waa (林健華)
Best C-pop lyrics award (最佳中文流行歌詞獎)	犯賤	Wyman Wong
Best original creation song award (最佳原創歌曲獎)	嫌棄	Gigi Leung, Chan Fai-young, Keith Chan (陳少琪)
Best revision song award (最佳改編歌曲獎)	絕對美麗	Aaron Kwok, G.Corpett, C.Lauper, S.Lunt, R.Chertoff, Chow lai-mau (周禮茂)
Outstanding Mandarin song award (優秀國語歌曲獎)	星晴 忠孝東路走九遍 我的心只可容納你	(gold) Jay Chou (silver) Power Station, Gwok zi (郭子), York Wu (鄔裕康) (bronze) Andy Lau, Chiu tsang-hei (趙增熹)
Sales award (全年最高銷量歌手大獎)	–	Sammi Cheng
IFPI sales award (IFPI 全年最高銷量大碟獎)	喜歡祖兒	Joey Yung
Leap award for male singer (飛躍大獎)	–	(gold) Leehom Wang (silver) Edison Chen (bronze) Jordan Chan, Steven Ma
Leap award for female singer (飛躍大獎)	–	(gold) Joey Yung (silver) Gigi Leung (bronze) Cecilia Cheung (bronze) Gigi Leung, Stephanie Che
National C-pop song award (全國最受歡迎中文流行歌曲獎)	有病呻吟 唯一 一笑而過	(gold) Jacky Cheung (silver) Leehom Wang (bronze) Na Ying
National most popular male singer award (全國最受歡迎歌手獎)	–	(gold) Andy Lau (silver) Sun Nan, Nicholas Tse (bronze) Yu Quan
National most popular female singer award (全國最受歡迎歌手獎)	–	(gold) Faye Wong (silver) Sammi Cheng (bronze) Stefanie Sun
International Chinese award (全球華人至尊金曲)	Shall We Talk	Eason Chan, Chan Fai-young, Albert Leung
Four channel award (四台聯頒獎項)	–	Andy Lau, Eason Chan, Chan Fai-young, Albert Leung
Solid gold honour award (金曲銀禧榮譽大獎)	–	Roman Tam
