= 1997 RTHK Top 10 Gold Songs Awards =

Hong Kong music awards ceremony

The 1997 RTHK Top 10 Gold Songs Awards (Chinese: 第二十屆十大中文金曲頒獎音樂會) was held in 1998 for the 1997 music season.

== Top 10 song awards ==
The top 10 songs (十大中文金曲) of 1997 are as follows.

Song name in Chinese	Artist	Composer	Lyricist
我們的主題曲	Sammi Cheng	Eddie Ng Kwok King (吳國敬)	Wyman Wong
愛的呼喚	Aaron Kwok	Davy Tam (譚國政)	Siu Mei (小美)
不老的傳說	Jacky Cheung	Dick Lee	Ivy Koo (古倩敏)
明知故犯	Mavis Hee	Tan Kah Beng (陳佳明)	Albert Leung
星夢情真	Kelly Chen	Mark Lui	Wyman Wong
只要為我愛一天	Leon Lai	Mark Lui	Albert Leung
歡樂今宵	Leo Ku	Dennie Wong (黃丹儀)	Wyman Wong
中國人	Andy Lau	Chan Yiu-cyun (陳耀川)	Preston Lee (李安修)
你快樂所以我快樂	Faye Wong	Zhang Yadong	Albert Leung
愛是永恆	Jacky Cheung	Dick Lee	Richard Lam

== Other awards ==
Award	Song or album (if available)	Recipient
Top 10 outstanding artists award (十大優秀流行歌手大獎)	–	Sammi Cheng, Cass Phang, Andy Hui, Andy Lau, Jacky Cheung, Ekin Cheng, Leon Lai, Aaron Kwok, Leo Ku, Faye Wong
Best new prospect award (最有前途新人獎)	–	(gold) Nicholas Tse (silver) A-mei (bronze) Jan Lamb (Exceptional award) Dry, Halina Tam, Jordan Chan
Best C-pop song award (最佳中文流行歌曲獎)	原來只要共你活一天	Keith Chan (陳少琪)
Best C-pop lyrics award (最佳中文流行歌詞獎)	約定	Albert Leung
Best original creation song award (最佳原創歌曲獎)	我有我天地	Cass Phang
Best original creation song award (最佳原創歌曲獎)	與我常在	Eason Chan
Best revision song award (最佳改編歌曲獎)	明知故犯	Mavis Hee
Outstanding Mandarin song award (優秀國語歌曲獎)	(gold) 中國人 (silver) 想和你去吹吹風 (bronze) 心太軟 (bronze) 相思無用	Andy Lau Jacky Cheung Richie Ren Ronald Cheng
Sales award (全年最高銷量歌手大獎)	–	Sammi Cheng, Jacky Cheung, Aaron Kwok, Leon Lai, Ekin Cheng
Sales champion award (全年最高銷量冠軍歌手大獎)	–	Jacky Cheung
Leap award for male singer (飛躍大獎)	–	(gold) Aaron Kwok (silver) Leo Ku (bronze) Daniel Chan
Leap award for female singer (飛躍大獎)	–	(gold) Sammi Cheng (silver) Faye Wong (bronze) Kelly Chen
International Chinese award (全球華人至尊金曲)	只要為我愛一天	Leon Lai
Golden 20th anniversary honor award (金曲廿載榮譽大獎)	–	The Flower Princess
