= 1979 RTHK Top 10 Gold Songs Awards =

Hong Kong music awards ceremony

The 1979 RTHK Top 10 Gold Songs Awards (Chinese: 第二屆十大中文金曲頒獎音樂會) was held in 1980 for the 1979 music season.

== Top 10 song awards ==
The top 10 songs (十大中文金曲) of 1979 are as follows.

Song name in Chinese	Artist	Composer	Lyricist
天蠶變	Michael Kwan	Michael Lai	Jimmy Lo Kwok Tsim
加價熱潮	Samuel Hui	Max C. Freedman, James E. Myers	Samuel Hui Peter Lai
好歌獻給你	Roman Tam	Kōji Makaino	Cheng Kwok Kong
春雨彎刀	Jenny Tseng	Joseph Koo	Tang Wai Hung
陌上歸人	Albert Au	Ricky Fung	Cheng Kwok Kong
茫茫路	Teresa Cheung	Joseph Koo	Jimmy Lo Kwok Tsim
眼淚為你流	Danny Chan	Danny Chan	Cheng Kwok Kong
楚留香	Adam Cheng	Joseph Koo	Tang Wai Hung Wong Jim
像白雲像清風	Liza Wang	Joseph Koo	Jimmy Lo Kwok Tsim
橄欖樹	Chyi Yu	Li Tai-hsiang	Sanmao (三毛)
