= 14 Blades =

2010 Hong Kong-Chinese film by Daniel Lee

- Film poster
- 锦衣卫
- Directed by: Daniel Lee
- Screenplay by: Daniel Lee; Abe Kwong; Mak Tin-shu; Lau Ho-leung; Chan Siu-cheung
- Story by: Daniel Lee
- Produced by: Wang Tianyun; Susanna Tsang
- Starring: Donnie Yen; Zhao Wei; Wu Chun; Kate Tsui; Qi Yuwu; Sammo Hung; Damian Lau
- Cinematography: Tony Cheung
- Edited by: Cheung Ka-fai; Tang Man-to
- Music by: Henry Lai
- Production companies: Visualizer Film Productions; Shanghai Film Group; Mediacorp Raintree Pictures; Western Movie Group; Desen International Media; Beijing ShengShi Huarui Film Investment & Management; Donlord Skykee Film Investment; Shenzhen Shenguang Media; Beijing Fenghua Times Culture Communication; Beijing New Film Association & Movie Industry; Star Union International Media Group; China Broadcast International Media
- Distributed by: Arclight Films; Easternlight Films
- Release dates: 4 February 2010 (China); 11 February 2010 (Hong Kong)
- Running time: 114 minutes
- Countries: Hong Kong; China
- Language: Mandarin
- Budget: HK$20 million
- Box office: US$3.7 million

14 Blades (锦衣卫) is a 2010 wuxia film directed by Daniel Lee and starring Donnie Yen, Zhao Wei, Wu Chun, Kate Tsui, Qi Yuwu, Sammo Hung, and Damian Lau. A Hong Kong-Chinese co-production, the film was released on 4 February 2010 in China and on 11 February 2010 in Hong Kong.

== Plot ==
During the Ming dynasty, the imperial court is riddled with corruption. Qinglong, a commander of the jinyiwei, an elite secret service trained from childhood, is ordered by the powerful eunuch Jia Jingzhong to retrieve a box allegedly containing evidence of treason. Qinglong instead discovers it holds the Imperial Seal, which Jia Jingzhong intends to use to legitimise a coup in support of the exiled Prince Qing. Branded a traitor, Qinglong is betrayed by his fellow jinyiwei, including his brother-in-arms Xuanwu, and forced to flee the capital while being pursued by Prince Qing's goddaughter, the highly-skilled warrior Tuo-Tuo.

Wounded and unable to escape the city, Qinglong takes refuge with a struggling private security company. Concealed in a wedding caravan, he escapes the capital alongside Qiao Hua, the daughter of the company's owner. When Qinglong's identity as a renegade jinyiwei is revealed, he takes Qiao Hua hostage in order to continue his mission. At Yanmen Pass, Qinglong uncovers evidence that Prince Qing's faction plans to sell border provinces to fund their coup. He forms a temporary alliance with a bandit gang led by Damo Panguan to raid the outpost holding the conspirators' forces.

The raid succeeds, and Qinglong defeats Xuanwu, recovering the Imperial Seal. Tuo-Tuo later kidnaps Qiao Hua, forcing Qinglong to surrender the Imperial Seal to save her. Determined to stop the coup, Qinglong continues pursuing Prince Qing's forces while arranging for Qiao Hua to carry the seal to the authorities. In a series of ambushes, Qinglong eliminates the remaining conspirators, killing Xuanwu after a final betrayal. Damo Panguan also sacrifices himself to allow Qiao Hua to escape from Tuo-Tuo.

Qinglong confronts Tuo-Tuo in a final duel at an abandoned temple. Mortally wounded, he uses his mechanical box of 14 blades to kill her, dying in the process. In the aftermath, Prince Qing's coup fails and he commits suicide. Qiao Hua inherits her father's private security company and continues travelling the desert routes. In the film's closing moments, she glimpses a distant figure resembling Qinglong, leaving his fate ambiguous.

== Cast ==
Notable cast members include the following.

- Donnie Yen as Qinglong (Azure Dragon)
- Zhao Wei as Qiao Hua
- Sammo Hung as Prince Qing
- Wu Chun as Damo Panguan (Judge of the Desert)
- Kate Tsui as Tuotuo
- Qi Yuwu as Xuanwu (Black Tortoise)
- Damian Lau as Zhao Shenyan
- Wu Ma as Qiao Yong
- Law Kar-ying as Jia Jingzhong
- Chen Kuan-tai as Fawang
- Chen Zhihui as Baihu (White Tiger)

== Production ==
14 Blades was scheduled to start filming on 14 May 2009 in Ningxia, China. Donnie Yen stated that he took the role of a villain in the film as he "wanted to tackle the role of a villain who discovers his humanity."

== Release ==
14 Blades premiered in China and Singapore on 4 February 2010 and in Hong Kong on 11 February. The film premiered at the seventh place in the Hong Kong box office, grossing US$317,975 in its first week. It grossed a total of US$984,711 at the Hong Kong box office. The film was successful in Singapore where it was first in the box office on its second week, grossing a total of US$1,126,692 on its theatrical run. The film grossed a total of US$3,676,875 worldwide.

== Reception ==
14 Blades was nominated for Best Action Choreography and Best Sound Design at the 29th Hong Kong Film Awards. The China Post praised Donnie Yen's acting ability and stated that the film was generally entertaining but criticised the action scenes, writing that "you never actually clearly see even one of the 14 blades. Unlike a really decent martial arts film, in which the battle scenes are well choreographed and you see the majority of the action, this film's fight scenes were only dynamic."

Many reviewers also criticised the film's heavy use of technology, including Kate Tsui's clothes-shedding technique. Film Business Asia gave the film a six out of ten, stating that 14 Blades has a "script that becomes increasingly incoherent and restless editing that grows more and more distracting" and that the action scenes were "largely dependant on wire-fu and CG...when [Donnie] Yen is allowed to show his skills properly...14 Blades starts to look like the film it could have been."

Variety called 14 Blades an "above-average martial-arts actioner that reinforces Donnie Yen's 'Man with No Name' ambience... Despite the circumstances, Qiao Hua falls in love with her captor, a development made believable by Zhao's warm and affecting perf. [sic] Yen's Eastwood-like poise is used to good effect here, and the romantic tension keeps the narrative effectively taut between the battle sequences."

The Hollywood Reporter wrote that the film "would have ended a mediocre film if not for the inventively designed and utilized weaponry (especially the titular 14 blades with different functions)" and had mixed reaction to the acting in the film, asserting that Donnie Yen's "stiff and steely demeanor actually works to his role's favor. The love interest with Qiao Hua is lame, especially with Zhao sleepwalking through another typecast role as playful, tomboyish heroine."

== Awards and nominations ==
17th Beijing College Student Film Festival

- Won: Favorite Actress (Zhao Wei)

4th China (Ningbo) Farmers Film Festival

- Won: Favorite Actress (Zhao Wei)

29th Hong Kong Film Awards

- Nominated: Best Action Choreography (Guk Hin-chiu)
- Nominated: Best Sound Design (Ken Wong and Phyllis Cheng)

19th Shanghai Film Critics Awards

- Won: Best Actress (Zhao Wei) also for Mulan (2009)
- Won : Films of Merit
