= 1980 RTHK Top 10 Gold Songs Awards =

Hong Kong music awards ceremony

The 1980 RTHK Top 10 Gold Songs Awards (Chinese: 第三屆十大中文金曲得獎名單) was held in 1981 for the 1980 music season.

== Top 10 song awards ==
The top 10 songs (十大中文金曲) of 1980 are as follows.

Song name in Chinese	Artist	Composer	Lyricist
人在旅途洒淚時	Michael Kwan Annabelle Lui (雷安娜)	Michael Lai	Jimmy Lo Kwok Tsim
上海灘	Frances Yip	Joseph Koo	Wong Jim
分分鐘需要你	George Lam	George Lam	Cheng Kwok Kong
水霞	Albert Au	Ricky Fung	Albert Au Yi Hung (易空)
在水中央	George Lam	George Lam	Cheng Kwok Kong
京華春夢	Liza Wang	Joseph Koo	Tang Wai Hung
殘夢	Michael Kwan	Michael Lai	Jimmy Lo Kwok Tsim
輪流轉	Adam Cheng	Joseph Koo	Wong Jim
親情	Roman Tam	Joseph Koo	Wong Jim
戲劇人生	Johnny Yip (葉振棠)	Michael Lai	Jimmy Lo Kwok Tsim
