= Samantha Lam (singer) =

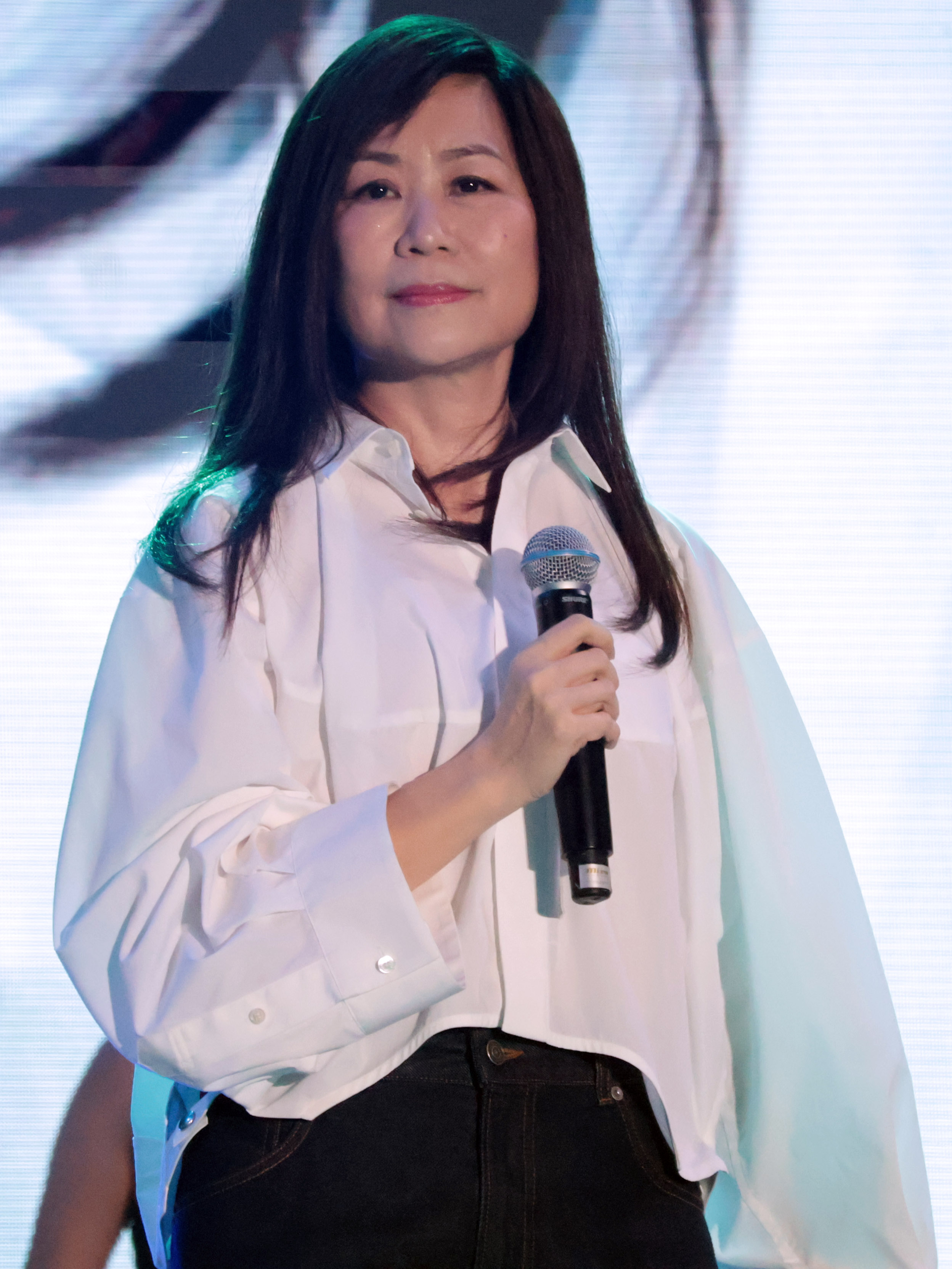
- Samantha Lam in 2024
- Born: April 9, 1963 (age 63); British Hong Kong
- Occupation: Singer
- Years active: 1982–1989, 2003–present

Chinese name
Transcriptions
Standard Mandarin
- Hanyu Pinyin: lín zhì měi
Yue: Cantonese
- Jyutping: lam4 zi3 mei5
- Musical career
- Genres: Cantopop, Mandopop
- Instrument: Vocals
- Label: Sony Music (1982–1989; 2020–present）

Samantha Lam Chi-mei (Chinese: 林志美, 9 April 1963) is a Hong Kong singer and songwriter. In 1982, the television station RTHK awarded one of her songs, "Feelings of a Passage" (感情的段落), later heard from her 1983 self-titled debut album, as one of top ten gold songs of 1981–82.

In 1983, Lam sang a radio hit Cantonese rendition of the well-known Mandarin song "Into Your Eyes" (你的眼神), originally sung in 1981 by Tsai Chin, for her eponymous debut album. Her eponymous album received a Local Platinum Disc award (本地白金唱片) from the International Federation of the Phonographic Industry (IFPI) in 1984 for selling over 30,000 copies.

In 1984–85, another of her songs, "ngau yu" (偶遇), a theme song for the 1984 film A Certain Romance (少女日記), was awarded as one of top ten gold songs of 1983–84 by RTHK, the seventh place of the Jade Solid Gold Best Ten Music Awards by another station TVB, and the Hong Kong Film Award for the Best Movie Song (最佳電影歌曲) of 1984. Lam sang also "ouyu" (偶遇), a Mandarin version of "ngau yu", for the titled 1984 album. Since then, later singers have rendered both versions of "ngau yu" (sometimes with slightly different lyrics), like Sammi Cheng and Zhou Xun.

Lam's albums released in 1984 were awarded certifications by the IFPI in 1985. What Is Fate? (甚麼是緣份) received a Local Platinum Disc award, and ngau yu (偶遇) received a Local Gold Disc Award for selling at least 15,000 copies.

In 1988, the IFPI awarded Lam's 1985 album Love Illusion (愛情幻像) a Local Gold Disc award and 1986 album Piano in a Rainy Night (雨夜鋼琴) a Local Platinum Disc award.

== Discography ==
- Samantha Lam (林志美), 1983
- What Is Fate? (甚麼是緣份 saam maw see yuen fan), 1984
- ngau yu (偶遇), 1984 (Chance Encounter)
- Love Illusion (愛情幻像 ngoi ching waan tzeung), 1985
- Piano in a Rainy Night and Blue Remixes (雨夜鋼琴、粉藍色的精選 yu yeh gong kam, fan laam sik dik jing hsuen), 1986
- You Say Goodbye (因你別離 yan nei beet lei), 1987
- sat toot (灑脫), 1988
- wing yuen dong ting (永遠動聽), 1988 (Timeless Pleasures or Forever Soothing)
- When Samantha Meets Chris Babida (當林志美遇上鮑比達 dong Lam Ji Mei yu seung Bau Bei Daat), 2003
- yuen mei tzu yi (原美主義), 2006
- Moment to Moment, 2009
