= 2000 RTHK Top 10 Gold Songs Awards =

Hong Kong music awards ceremony

The 2000 RTHK Top 10 Gold Songs Awards (Chinese: 第二十三屆十大中文金曲頒獎音樂會) was held in 2001 for the 2000 music season.

== Top 10 song awards ==
The top 10 songs (十大中文金曲) of 2000 are as follows.

| Song name in Chinese | Artist | Composer | Lyricist |
|---|---|---|---|
| K歌之王 | Eason Chan | Chan Fai-young | Albert Leung |
| 感情線上 | Sammi Cheng | Wong ga-sin (黃嘉倩) | Albert Leung |
| 給自己的情書 | Faye Wong | C.Y.Kong | Albert Leung |
| 誰來愛我 | Joey Yung | Ronald Ng (伍樂城) | Albert Leung |
| 花花宇宙 | Kelly Chen | Mark Lui | Albert Leung |
| 一生一火花 | Jacky Cheung | Ronald Ng (伍樂城) | Albert Leung |
| 著迷 | Aaron Kwok | John Laudon (劉諾生) | Siu mei (小美) |
| 男人哭吧不是罪 | Andy Lau | T.C. Liu (劉天健) | Andy Lau |
| 少女的祈禱 | Miriam Yeung | Chan Fai-young | Albert Leung |
| 活著Viva | Nicholas Tse | Nicholas Tse | Albert Leung |

== Other awards ==
The top 10 outstanding artist was also extended to 11 artists.

| Award | Song or album (if available) | Recipient |
|---|---|---|
| Top 10 outstanding artists award (十大優秀流行歌手大獎) | – | Sammi Cheng, Andy Lau, Aaron Kwok, Kelly Chen, Jacky Cheung, Andy Hui, Eason Chan, Coco Lee, Nicholas Tse, Faye Wong |
| Best karaoke song award (最愛歡迎卡拉ok歌曲獎) | K歌之王 感情線上 會過去的 | (gold) Eason Chan (silver) Sammi Cheng (bronze) Andy Hui, Stephanie Che |
| Best new male prospect award (最有前途新人獎) | – | (gold) Edison Chen (silver) Louis Koo (bronze) Nick Cheung |
| Best new female prospect award (最有前途新人獎) | – | (gold) Elva Hsiao (silver) Flora Chan (bronze) Elle Choi (小雪), Rain Lee |
| Exceptional prospect award (優異獎) | – | Stefanie Sun Uku Peng (彭海桐) Ding Fei Fei (丁菲飛) |
| Best C-pop song award (最佳中文流行歌曲獎) | 至少還有你 | Davy Chan |
| Best C-pop lyrics award (最佳中文流行歌詞獎) | 深藍 | Kiu zing-fu (喬靖夫) |
| Outstanding Mandarin song award (優秀國語歌曲獎) | 我不夠愛你 那麼愛你為什麼 浪花一朵朵 | (gold) Andy Lau, Kelly Chen (silver) Wong Bun-yun (黃品源), Karen Mok (bronze) Richie Ren, Ah Niu, Michael Wong |
| Sales award (全年最高銷量歌手大獎) | – | Nicholas Tse Kelly Chen |
| Sales award (全年銷量冠軍大獎) | 戀愛情色 | Kelly Chen |
| Leap award for male singer (飛躍大獎) | – | (gold) Nicholas Tse (silver) Eason Chan (bronze) Leehom Wang |
| Leap award for female singer (飛躍大獎) | – | (gold) Kelly Chen (silver) Miriam Yeung (bronze) Joey Yung, Gigi Leung |
| National C-pop song award (全國最受歡迎中文流行歌曲獎) | 我不夠愛你 給自己的情書 幸福 | (gold) Andy Lau, Kelly Chen (silver) Faye Wong (bronze) Chen ming (陳明) |
| National most popular male singer award (全國最受歡迎歌手獎) | – | (gold) Andy Lau (silver) Leehom Wang (bronze) Sun Nan |
| National most popular female singer award (全國最受歡迎歌手獎) | – | (gold) Faye Wong (silver) Tian Zhen (bronze) Na Ying |
| International Chinese award (全球華人至尊金曲) | 感情線上 | Sammi Cheng |
| International most popular Chinese award (全球華人最受歡迎歌手獎) | – | Jacky Cheung Faye Wong |
| Four channel award (四台聯頒獎項) | – | Kelly Chen, Eason Chan, Faye Wong, Chan Fai-young, Albert Leung |
| RTHK Golden needle award (金針獎) | – | Jacky Cheung |
