= 1988 RTHK Top 10 Gold Songs Awards =

Hong Kong music awards ceremony

The 1988 RTHK Top 10 Gold Songs Awards (Chinese: 1988年度十大中文金曲得獎) was held in 1988 for the 1987 music season.

== Top 10 song awards ==
The top 10 songs (十大中文金曲) of 1988 are as follows.

Song name in Chinese	Artist	Composer	Lyricist
友誼之光	Maria Cordero	Chow Laam-ping (周藍萍)	Naam yin (南燕)
無需要太多	Leslie Cheung	Ma Siu-jeon (馬兆駿)	Albert Leung
傻女	Priscilla Chan	–	Richard Lam
真的漢子	George Lam	George Lam	Zeng Gwok-gong (鄭國江)
祝福	Sally Yeh	Loeng Wang-zi (梁弘志)	Pun Wai-yun (潘偉源)
千載不變	The Wynners	Alan Tam Kenny Bee	Lou Wing-koeng (盧永強)
煙雨淒迷	Danny Chan	Gik Siu-wui (擊小回)	Pun Wai-yun (潘偉源)
沉默是金	Samuel Hui Leslie Cheung	Leslie Cheung	Samuel Hui
大約在冬季	Chyi Chin	Chyi Chin	Chyi Chin
Stand By Me	Anita Mui	–	Keith Chan (陳少琪)

== Other awards ==
Award	Song or album (if available)	Recipient
Best new prospect award (最有前途新人獎)	–	(gold) Grasshopper (silver) Andy Hui (bronze) Paradox (夢劇院) (Exceptional award) Vivian Chow, Li Tat-sing (李達成)
Best record producer award (最佳唱片監製獎)	祝福	George Lam Zung deng-yat (鍾定一) Paco Wong (黃柏高) Sally Yeh
Best musical arrangements (最佳編曲獎)	忘情號	Tsui Yat-kan (徐日勤)
Best record design award (最佳唱片封套設計獎)	我等著你回來	William Chang for Tat Ming Pair
Best C-pop song award (最佳中文流行歌曲獎)	但願人長久	Lowell Lo
Best C-pop lyrics award (最佳中文流行歌詞獎)	祝福	Pun wai-yun (潘偉源)
Best performance award (最受歡迎演出中文歌曲獎)	石頭記	Tat Ming Pair
Sales award (全年銷量冠軍大獎)	擁抱	Alan Tam
IFBI award (IFPI大獎)	–	Leslie Cheung
RTHK Golden needle award (金針獎)	–	The Wynners
