= Kellyjackie =

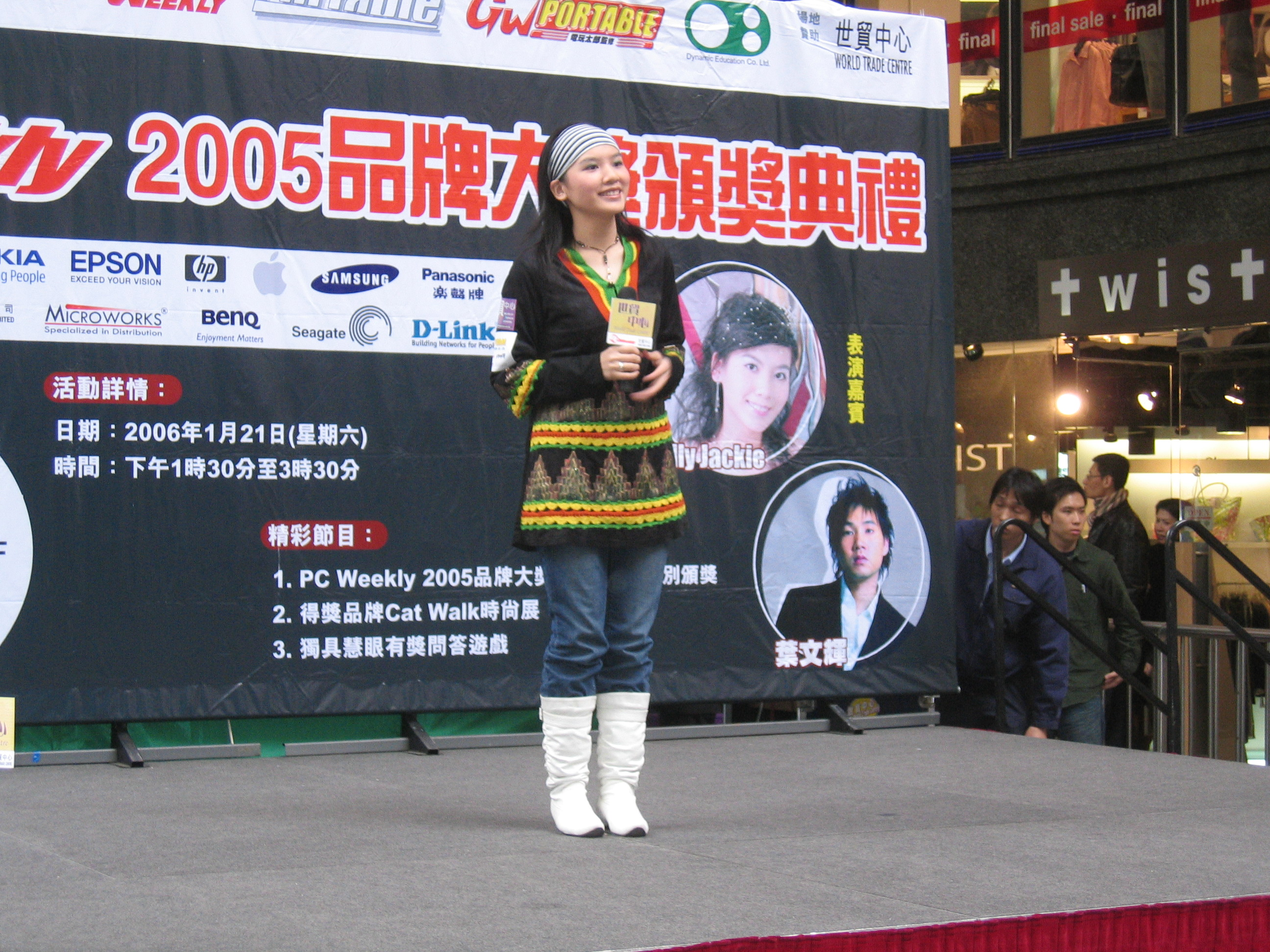
- Born: Jackie Chan Hiu-ki; 23 August 1986 (age 38); British Hong Kong
- Occupation: Singer
- Years active: 2005–present

Chinese name
- Traditional Chinese: 陳曉琪
- Simplified Chinese: 陈晓琪
Transcriptions
Standard Mandarin
- Hanyu Pinyin: chen2 xiao3 qi2
Yue: Cantonese
- Jyutping: can4 hiu2 kei4
- Musical career
- Also known as: Kellyjackie
- Origin: Hong Kong
- Genres: Cantopop
- Instrument: Piano
- Labels: MusicNEXT(2011– )

Jackie Chan Hiu-ki, also known as Kellyjackie, is a Hong Kong pop singer and a former member of a band called the Royals. Her artist name, Kellyjackie, is an amalgam of the name of her childhood idol, Kelly Chen, and her own name "Jackie".

Starting at the age of 13, while still in secondary school, Kellyjackie started putting her own covers of other Hong Kong pop singers' songs online. After about one year, she started writing her own songs. She then put her first self-composed song Lucky voice and her other songs onto the internet. In January 2005, she wrote the song He invites me to Disneyland (他約我去迪士尼) to cope with the stress of the Hong Kong Certificate of Education Examination. She claimed the song was inspired by the classic fairy tale of Sleeping Beauty and court romance. She eventually repeated form five, and entered PLK Vicwood KT Chong Sixth Form College with satisfactory results, but left the College in a year to develop her singing career.

She uploaded her song He invites me to Disneyland to her band's forum, her Xanga site, i010.com and also cmidi.com for others to download for free. Surprisingly, the song quickly became popular on the internet (mainly through Bulletin Board Systems and WinMX) within a few weeks. Many DJs also started talking about the song on the radio. Many were amazed by her talent, given her age and her busy schedule as a secondary school student preparing for her O-level exams. Nevertheless, the song eventually became extremely popular and received widely positive reviews in Hong Kong, Macau, and Guangdong and landed her a 5-year recording contract.

To celebrate the opening of the Hong Kong Disneyland, the Walt Disney Company published the Hong Kong Disneyland -The Grand Opening Celebration Album (香港迪士尼樂園開幕紀念大碟) and invited both Kellyjackie and Kelly Chen to perform the song He invites me to Disneyland, and later to record the song.

After a 5-year hiatus from the Hong Kong music scene because of contract problems with her former manager, she made her comeback by signing with MusicNEXT in 2011 for 3 years.
