= Urban Emotions =

Studio album by Hins Cheung
- Released: July 11, 2008
- Genre: Cantopop
- Length: 52:28
- Label: Universal Records

Hins Cheung chronology
Ardently Love (2007)	Urban Emotions (2008)	Love & Living (2009)

Urban Emotions is the eighth studio album by Hins Cheung, released on July 11, 2008. The album features new versions of the duet, "Hate that I Love You", with international star Rihanna. Rihanna's original vocals remain unchanged from the original version, with Cheung replacing Ne-Yo's vocals in Cantonese and Mandarin.

== Track listing ==
1. 他的故事 (His Story)
2. 願望樹上 (Above the wishing tree)
3. 櫻花樹下 (Under the Sakura)
4. 隱形人 (Invisible Man)
5. 狐 (Alone)
6. 夜宴 (Banquet)
7. 酩酊天使 (Cruel Angel)
8. 鬧鬼愛情 (Haunted Love)
9. 不吐不快 (Rave)
10. 雪花抄 (Snow Flakes)
11. Déjà vu
12. Hate That I Love You [Cantonese] - Rihanna & 張敬軒
13. Hate That I Love You [Mandarin] - Rihanna & 張敬軒
14. 吻得太逼真 [Mandarin] (The kiss is too real 'Ardently Love' Mandarin version)
