= Tat Ming Pair =

Hong Kong musical duo

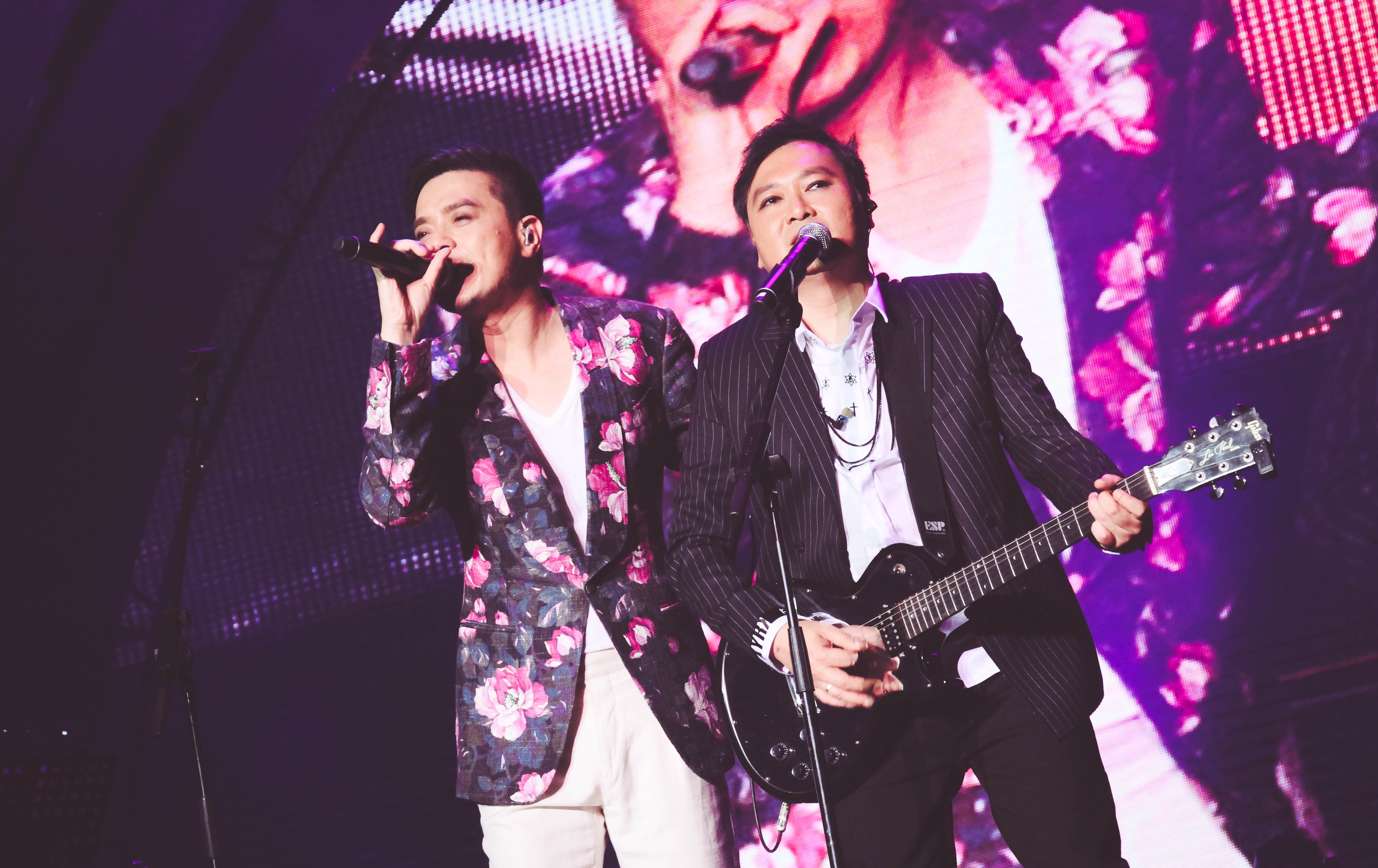
- Tat Ming Pair performing in Singapore in 2014

Background information
- Origin: Hong Kong
- Genres: Cantopop, synthpop, electronic dance music, rock, new wave
- Years active: 1985–1990, 1996, 2004–2005, 2011–present
- Members: Tats Lau; Anthony Wong Yiu Ming

Chinese name
- Traditional Chinese: 達明一派
- Simplified Chinese: 达明一派
Transcriptions
Standard Mandarin
- Hanyu Pinyin: da2 ming2 yi1 pai4
Yue: Cantonese
- Jyutping: daat6 ming4 yat1 paai1

Tat Ming Pair (Chinese: 達明一派; Jyutping: daat^{6} ming^{4} jat^{1} paai^{3}) is an experimental Cantopop duo formed in Hong Kong in 1985 by composer Tats Lau (劉以達) and vocalist Anthony Wong Yiu-ming (黃耀明). Their blend of Cantopop, synthpop, new wave and electronic dance music with lyrics that reflected contemporary social, political, and literary themes, made them one of the first alternative and most influential bands of the 1980s Hong Kong music scene. The band enjoyed critical and commercial success until a hiatus in 1990. After their breakup, Wong proceeded as a solo artist while Lau went into acting although the duo have reunited several times over the years.

On 3 January 2019, the duo received the Golden Needle Award for their outstanding musical contributions at the RTHK Top 10 Gold Songs Awards. Since the 2019 Hong Kong protests, the duo's songs have been blocked from music streaming sites in mainland China due to the political nature of their songs.

== Music career ==
=== Formation: 1985 ===
Tats Lau and Anthony Wong Yiu-ming met in 1985 when Wong was working as a DJ for Commercial Radio Hong Kong. Wong answered a singer-wanted advert placed in a music magazine by instrumentalist Lau, who had created two previous bands known as DLLM and Oriental Electronic Orchestra. The two discovered that they had a mutual interest in electronic music and they began working on original material. Lau became the main music composer of their songs. Hong Kong radio personality Winnie Yu christened them as "Tat Ming Pair" and they were signed to PolyGram Records.

=== Initial years: 1986–1991 ===
The band provided an alternative to the mainstream pop/rock bands of the time due to their melodious synth-based music and politically conscious lyrics combined with themes drawn from classic literature. Their music was influenced by British musicians including Pet Shop Boys and David Bowie. Due to the pitch-sensitive tonal nature of Cantonese, pairing Cantonese lyrics with the western-style musical scale can be a difficult process. Thus they began their ongoing collaboration with lyricists such as Calvin Poon Yuen-Leung (潘源良), Yiu-Fai Chow (周耀輝) and Keith Chan Siu-Kei. The majority of their album art was directed by famed designer William Chang.

They released their first mini-album Tat Ming Pair (達明一派) in March 1986, followed by their debut full-length LP Tat Ming Pair II (達明一派II) in September of the same year. The cover of their debut EP contained an image prominently displaying Wong's long hair, a hairstyle which was considered subversive for men at the time in Hong Kong. Selected songs from their first full-length album were included in the 1986 film Kiss Me Good-Bye (戀愛季節) starring Wong and Loletta Lee. The film's soundtrack also featured singer Samey Fong.

Their second full-length album The Story of the Stone (石頭記) was released in 1987 and contained some of their biggest hit songs such as the title track, "Angels of the Road (馬路天使)" and "Rear Window (後窗)". An instrumental version of the title track was included as the opening theme for the film Golden Swallow (金燕子) starring Wong and Cherie Chung. The film's soundtrack also included an alternate recording of their song "Searching For Love (情探)".

They continued to produce innovative records and their January 1988 release I'm Waiting For Your Return (我等着你回來) was considered Hong Kong's first concept album. The album theme dealt with the ongoing emigration of Hong Kong residents due to an uncertain political status after the signing of the Sino-British Joint Declaration. The album won the award for Best Record Design at the 1988 RTHK Top 10 Gold Songs Awards in which the band also won the award for Best Performance.

In June 1988, they released Do You Still Love Me? (你還愛我嗎). The album contains one of their most famous songs "A Murder Unannounced in Advance (沒有張揚的命案)". The album is also noted for containing the song "Forbidden Colors (禁色)" which was one of the first songs in the Hong Kong music industry to deal with homosexuality and has since become an LGBT anthem. The title of the song was inspired by Yukio Mishima's novel and the song has been covered by other artists including Denise Ho and Eason Chan and was featured in the 1992 Evans Chan film To Liv(e).

They released Fallen Angel (意難平) in 1989, the original Chinese title being taken from a line in Dream of the Red Chamber. The album was partially influenced by Spanish guitar melodies. The album lyrically contained varying themes such as "Love in the Time of Cholera (愛在瘟疫蔓延時)" which was a dedication to victims of AIDS. The album is also lauded for containing the song "Forget He Or She (忘記他是她)" the first song on the Hong Kong music scene to examine gender fluidity.

On May 27, 1989, the band participated in the Concert for Democracy in China which was a benefit concert held at Happy Valley Racecourse in support of the students involved in the Tiananmen Square protests. The event lasted for 12 hours and raised over 1.5 million USD for the students in Beijing.

Their final release before their initial hiatus was 1990's acclaimed Nerves (神經), another concept album which contained many songs relating to the 1989 Tiananmen Square protests and unease towards the upcoming 1997 handover of Hong Kong such as "The Ten Young Firemen (十個救火的少年)" and "Don't Ask The Sky (天問)".

In 1991, the duo split amicably over a difference in musical opinion and a desire to pursue other work.

=== Solo careers: 1991–1996 ===
After their separation, Lau formed several musical projects including Tats Lau and Dream (劉以達與夢) and wrote songs for other singers. Lau also composed music for film soundtracks and pursued his own acting career.

Wong began to collaborate with other songwriters and lyricists, such as Jason Choi (蔡德才) and Lin Xi. During this period, Wong released several successful albums which reached critical and commercial success. His solo career culminated in him winning the award for Best Original Song at the 1995 RTHK Top 10 Gold Songs Awards and the Metro Showbiz Hit Awards (新城勁爆頒獎禮) for his song "Before Sunrise (春光乍洩)". The video for "Before Sunrise (春光乍洩)" was directed by Susie Au and cinematography was done by Christopher Doyle.

=== Reunion: 1996–present ===
The band reunited in 1996 to celebrate their 10-year anniversary and released a new single "A Forbidden Fruit Once Per Day (每日一禁果)" which won the top prize at the Ultimate Song Chart Awards (叱咤樂壇流行榜). They released their album Viva! Viva! Viva! (萬歲！萬歲！萬萬歲) in October 1996, staging a large-scale concert filmed at Queen Elizabeth Stadium the same month. They also released a live album entitled Viva! Viva! Viva!: The Concert (萬歲！萬歲！萬萬歲！！演唱會) in 1997.

The duo once again parted ways to focus on solo work, not reuniting again until 2004 for the release of the single "Blessed are the Lonely Ones (寂寞的人有福了)". In July 2005, they released the album The Party for their 20th anniversary. They once again staged more large-scale concerts filmed at the Hong Kong Coliseum, Hong Kong Convention and Exhibition Centre and the Shanghai Indoor Stadium. The duo also released the live album At the Service Of The People (為人民服務演唱會).

They once again reunited in 2012 to release a single "It's My Party" to celebrate their 25th anniversary. They also held a four-night residency concert in April 2012 at the Hong Kong Coliseum entitled 兜兜轉轉演演唱唱會 which resulted in another live album and DVD. The duo celebrated their 30th anniversary in 2017 with a series of concerts once again at the Hong Kong Coliseum and they also released the maxi single "1+4=14". They released the live album 達明卅一派對 in November 2017.

On January 3, 2019, the duo received the Golden Needle Award due to their success and artistic influence on the Hong Kong music scene. In April 2019, all of the band's music was removed from Apple Music and other music streaming sites in mainland China as a result of censorship by the Chinese government due to the political and democratic nature of their songs.

In May 2019, they released the song "Memory Is A Crime (回憶有罪)" in honor of the 30th anniversary of the victims of the Tiananmen Square Massacre. It was composed by Lau with lyrics by Lin Xi. The song topped the iTunes chart in Hong Kong but was immediately banned in mainland China where discussion involving the protests and the violent military response is forbidden. On June 4, 2019, Wong performed the song live during the annual Tiananmen Square vigil in Victoria Park.

In November 2020, the band held a series of concerts at Queen Elizabeth Stadium entitled REPLAY, which celebrated their two albums Fallen Angel (意難平) and Nerves (神經). In December 2020, the band released the single "All Over The World (今天世上所有地方)".

In November 2021, the band released the single "My Boyfriend (我的男朋友)".

In January 2022, local media reported that ten Canto-pop singers and groups had been put on a blacklist of government-funded broadcaster RTHK, with radio DJs having been ordered not to play their songs. Tat Ming Pair and Wong were reportedly on the list. In response to a letter by lawmaker Tik Chi-yuen requesting clarification, RTHK wrote: "RTHK has been supporting the development of Chinese pop music. Program hosts choose songs based on professionalism and suitability to the programs."

== Discography ==
=== Studio albums ===
- Tat Ming Pair II 達明一派II (1986)
- The Story of The Stone 石頭記 (1987)
- I'm Waiting For Your Return 我等着你回來 (1988)
- Do You Still Love Me? 你還愛我嗎 (1988)
- Fallen Angel 意難平 (1989)
- Nerves 神經 (1990)
- Viva! Viva! Viva! 萬歲！萬歲！萬萬歲！(1996)
- The Party (2005)

=== EPs and Singles ===
- Tat Ming Pair 達明一派 (1986)
- Tat Ming Pair Remix 達明一派Remix (1986)
- Tender Is The Night 夜未央 (1988)
- A Forbidden Fruit Once Per Day 每日一禁果 (1996)
- Blessed Are The Lonely Ones 寂寞的人有福了 (2004)
- It's My Party (2012)
- 1+4=14 (2017)
- Memory Is A Crime 回憶有罪 (2019)

=== Live albums ===
- Viva! Viva! Viva!: The Concert 萬歲！萬歲！萬萬歲！！演唱會 (1997)
- At the Service Of The People 為人民服務演唱會 (2005)
- Tat Ming Concert Live 2012 兜兜轉轉演演唱唱會 (2012)
- Tat Ming Pair 30th Anniversary Live Concert 達明卅一派對 (2017)

=== Compilations ===
- 86/87 Memory Collection 86/87紀念集 (1987)
- We Grew Up Like That 我們就是這樣長大的 (1988)
- Unusual Memory 不一樣的記憶 (1990)
- The Best Of Tat Ming 回想 (1991)
- Keep Searching 繼續追尋 (1994)
- Service People Collection 為人民服務作品全集 (1996)
- Two Men Best Collection 二人前精選 (1998)
- Special Relation 37 Best Collection 特殊關係37首 (1999)
- Tat Ming Reunion 達明Reunion (2004)

=== Collaborations ===
- Metro Radio Tat Ming Pair x Nicholas Tse Concert Live 同場異夢音樂會 (2005) (with Nicholas Tse)
