= Ardently Love =

Studio album by Hins Cheung
- Released: August 16, 2007
- Genre: Cantopop
- Producer: Universal Records

Hins Cheung chronology
The Book of Laughter and Forgetting (2006)	Ardently Love (2007)	Urban Emotions (2008)

Ardently Love is the seventh album by Hins Cheung, and was released on August 16, 2007. The first edition contains 10 tracks. The second edition contains a bonus DVD containing 12 various karaoke songs.

== Track listing ==
1. 酷愛 (Ardently Love)
2. 追風箏的孩子 (Kid Chasing Kite)
3. 迷失表參道 (Lost in Drive)
4. 感情用事 (Emotional)
5. 男孩最痛 (What Hurts a Man)
6. 我的天 (My God)
7. 悔過詩 (Repentance Poetry)
8. 悲劇人物 (Tragedy Character)
9. 遙吻 (Kiss)
10. 放榜 (Results Released)
