= Michael Kwan =

- 關正傑
- Born: 27 March 1949 (age 77); Hong Kong
- Education: University of Hong Kong
- Occupations: Architect, singer
- Years active: 1968–1988
- Spouse: Margaret

Chinese name
- Traditional Chinese: 關正傑
- Simplified Chinese: 关正杰
Transcriptions
Standard Mandarin
- Hanyu Pinyin: guan1 zheng4 jie2
Yue: Cantonese
- Jyutping: gwaan1 zeng3 git6
- Musical career
- Genres: Cantopop, Hong Kong English pop
- Instruments: Singing, guitar, violin, trumpet, clarinet, harmonica, piano
- Label: Philips

Michael Kwan Ching-kit (Chinese: 關正傑, born 27 March 1949) is a Hong Kong Cantopop singer previously with the Philips label (the brand Polygram was not adopted until later in Hong Kong), and later with EMI. His back catalogue (1986–1988) continues to be published by Universal Music Group. He retired from his music career in 1988 to work as an architect in Seattle, United States, with his wife and son.

== Biography ==
Kwan was born in Hong Kong and graduated from St. Paul's Church Titus Kindergarten (now St. Paul's Church Kindergarten) in 1954, he attended the primary school affiliated with St. Paul's Co-educational College Primary School and St Paul's Co-educational College in his early years. In 1986, Kwan released the album "Revelation", returning to the image and singing style of PolyGram's later years.

Writer Eunice Lam (1980) says Kwan's voice "is noble and elegant... his handling of the emotions in the lyrics is... delicate and gentle."; "He appeared like a shy college student. The audience wanted to protect him and did not expect to see any tricks, but just wanted to appreciate his beautiful voice."

== Retirement from music ==
After releasing his last album "One Autumn" (一個秋天) in 1988, Kwan continued to participate in some music activities. In 1989/90, he sang three TV theme songs (not recorded in any album), including the TVB TV series "Sharks in the Sea", the Macau TV series "Policewoman 90" and the Hong Kong and Taiwan children's drama "Berlin Weekly". He officially retired from the music scene on 31 December 1989 after attending the New Year's Eve program "Together for the Creation of 90". Before leaving the music scene, he neither gave any notice nor held a farewell concert.
