= Eric Kwok =

Hong Kong singer, music producer, and actor

- 郭偉亮
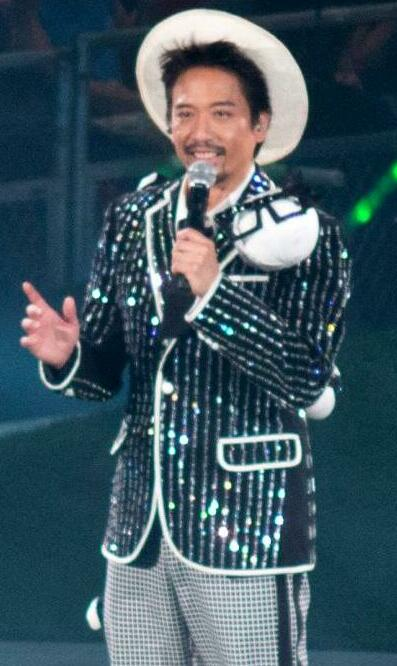
- Kwok at a concert in 2014
- Pronunciation: Kwok Wai-leung
- Born: 3 February 1974 (age 52); British Hong Kong
- Education: University of California, Los Angeles
- Occupations: Music producer; composer; singer; actor
- Years active: 1997–present
- Musical career
- Origin: Hong Kong
- Genres: Cantopop
- Instrument: Vocals
- Labels: Emperor Entertainment Group; Silly Thing; Universal Music Hong Kong; EAS Music
- Formerly of: Swing
- Spouse: Grace Ip (2011–present)

Chinese name
- Traditional Chinese: 郭偉亮
- Simplified Chinese: 郭伟亮
Transcriptions
Standard Mandarin
- Hanyu Pinyin: Guō Wěi-liàng
Yue: Cantonese
- Jyutping: Kwok^{3} Wai^{5}-leung^{6}
- Website: Official Instagram

Eric Kwok Wai-leung (Note: Chinese: 郭偉亮; Jyutping: Kwok^{3} Wai^{5}-leung^{6}) (born 3 February 1974) is a Hong Kong Cantopop music producer, composer, singer, and actor.

== Life and career ==
Eric Kwok was born on 3 February 1974, in Hong Kong. He moved to the United States at the age of 13 and later graduated from the University of California, Los Angeles majoring in communication. His passion for music started when he received a piano keyboard as a gift from his mother and would spend ten hours a day playing with it. His father, a former lawyer, initially opposed his music career but was moved to tears after listening to his 2004 debut solo album,Eric Kwok Collection. Kwok returned to Hong Kong and launched his first songwriting credit in 1997 with Leon Lai's "If You Are at My Home Tonight", under the pen name Moz. He is a former member of the music duo Swing from 1999 to 2002. Over the years, he has written and produced hits for various artistes, including Leon Lai, Eason Chan, Cass Phang, and Kay Tse, to name a few. In 2022, Kwok took on the role of coaching supervisor in the TVB's singing competition show Stars Academy 2.

== Discography ==
- Eric Kwok Collection (2004)
- Eric Kwok Cantonese Album (Eric Kwok 廣東大碟) (2007)
- Eric Kwok's Leet Collection (2009)
- Eric Kwok Best Selections (我最喜愛的Eric Kwok作品展) (2014)

== Representative works ==
*Song titles are roughly translated into English for readability purposes. Actual Chinese song titles are indicated in parentheses.

- Leon Lai – "If You Are at My Home Tonight" (假如今夜你在我的家) – 1997
- Jacky Cheung – "A Person Behind You" (有個人) – 1999
- Sally Yeh – "Mourning" (傷逝) – 2002
- Miriam Yeung – "Miriam Yeung" (楊千嬅) – 2002
- Edison Chen – "Number Nine" – 2003
- Eason Chan – "Ambush From All Sides" (十面埋伏) – 2003
- Eason Chan – "Sunsets" (夕陽無限好) – 2005
- Eason Chan – "My Best But Injurious Friend" (最佳損友) – 2006
- Hacken Lee – "Which House Will the Flower Land" (花落誰家) – 2007
- Eason Chan – "The Great Wheel of Times" (時代巨輪) – 2007
- Kay Tse – "Wedding Invitation Street" (囍帖街) – 2008
- Eason Chan – "Unhindered (無人之境) – 2009
- Joey Yung – "Not Yet Lovers" (戀人未滿) – 2011
- Eason Chan – "Heavy Taste" (重口味) – 2012
- Eason Chan – "End" (完) – 2012
- Hacken Lee – "House of Cards" (紙牌屋) – 2013
- Eason Chan – "Faraway" (遠在咫尺) – 2013
- Eric Kwok – "Iron Man" – 2014
- Eason Chan – "Unconditional (無條件) – 2015
- Eason Chan – "To Like Someone" (喜歡一個人) – 2015
- Gin Lee – "In Pairs" (雙雙) – 2016
- Gin Lee – "Flight Attendant" (空姐) – 2017
- Gin Lee – "Very Strong" (很堅強) – 2018
- Angela Hui – "Don't Treat Me Good" (別為我好) – 2020
- Mike Tsang – "I Am Not Even" (我不如) – 2021
- Mike Tsang feat. JC – "I Am No Cupid" (我不是邱比特) – 2021
- Gin Lee feat. Jacky Cheung – "When the Sun Rises" (日出時讓街燈安睡) – 2021

== Filmography ==
=== Television series ===
Year	Title	Role	Notes	Ref.
2016	Barter Game	Co-host	Variety show	
2017	My Very Short Marriage	Terry	Main role	
2018	Goodnight Show - King Maker	Mentor	Singing competition	
2019	King Maker II	Mentor	Singing competition	
2019	Psycho Detective 2		Main role	
2021	Jade Solid Gold	Co-host	Music programme	
2022	Stars Junior Academy	Programme director	Singing competition	
2022	Stars Academy 2	Coaching supervisor	Singing competition	
2022	Po-Po-Poker	Co-host	Variety show	

=== Film ===
Year	Title	Role	Ref.
2014	Delete My Love	Wah Dee	
2015	Full Strike	Lung	
2015	Knock Knock! Who's There?	a psychopath	
2016	Robbery		
2016	The Moment		
2017	Husband Killers		
2018	Rhapsody of Kidnapping		
2018	Distinction		

== Concerts ==
- My Favorite Eric Kwok Concert (2014)
