= Hins Cheung =

Hong Kong singer (born 1981)

- 張敬軒
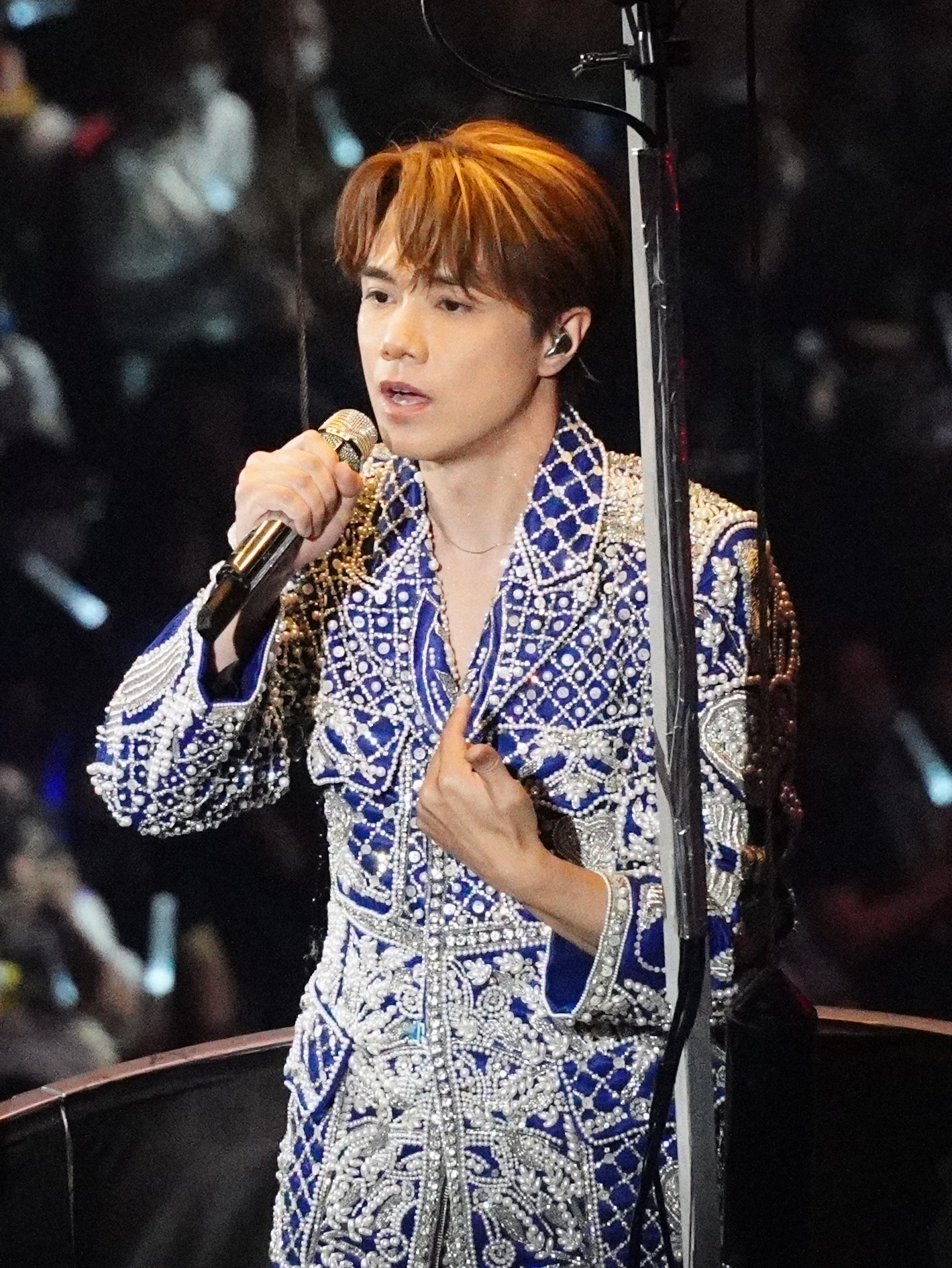
- Cheung in 2022
- Born: Cheung King-hin; February 1, 1981 (age 45); Guangzhou, Guangdong, China
- Other names: 軒仔, 軒公, 皇上, Cyrus Cheung, Jordan Cheung (Secondary stage), 장대빈 (張大彬)
- Occupations: Singer; songwriter; music producer
- Years active: 2001–present
- Employer: Albert Yeung
- Organization: Emperor Entertainment Group
- Agent(s): Fame, Star Max, Emperor Entertainment
- Height: 1.75 m (5 ft 9 in)

Chinese name
- Traditional Chinese: 張敬軒
- Simplified Chinese: 张敬轩
- Hanyu Pinyin: Zhāng Jìngxuān
- Jyutping: Zoeng1 Ging3hin1
Transcriptions
Standard Mandarin
- Hanyu Pinyin: Zhāng Jìngxuān
Yue: Cantonese
- Yale Romanization: Jēung Ginghīn
- Jyutping: Zoeng1 Ging3hin1
- Musical career
- Origin: Hong Kong
- Genre: Cantopop & Mandopop
- Instruments: piano, violin
- Labels: Universal (2002–2013), EEG Music (2014–2021), Fitto Records (2021–present)
- Website: instagram.com/hinscheung

Hins Cheung / Cheung King-hin (Chinese: 張敬軒; born February 1, 1981), is a Hong Kong singer, songwriter, record producer, actor, chef, and businessman. He made his debut in 2001 with the studio album Hins' First. He has since released 17 studio albums and EPs. Among his various accolades, he has won the Ultimate Song Chart Awards Best Male Singer Gold prize six times, Jade Solid Gold Most Popular Male Singer four times, and Best Pop Male Singer at the Top Ten Chinese Gold Songs Awards.

Besides his music career, Cheung also owns Avon Recording Studios, bridal brand Sennet Frères, and also invested into restaurants of his own design, including Junon and The Crown, both in Wan Chai.

== Early life and education ==
Cheung was born in Guangzhou, China, and raised in Guangdong province, with ancestry from Beijing. He graduated from Dongshan Pui Ching Primary School, Guangzhou No.7 High school and Guangzhou Wuyang Financial and Economic Vocational School. Influenced by the strong musical atmosphere in his family since he was a child, he began training in Peking opera and musical instruments (piano and violin) at the age of four, and practiced opening his voice every day. He quickly became comfortable with learning music and was regarded as a musical genius, but gave up after only half of his violin lessons. Due to his poor grades and his father's advice, he eventually chose to study accounting at a vocational school after hoping to go to an art school in high school.

== Career ==
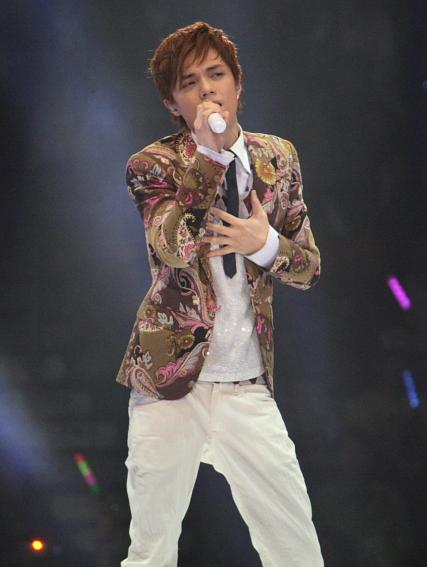
Cheung performing in 2008

Originally scheduled for eight shows beginning on November 15, 2019, Cheung's concert featuring the Hong Kong Chinese Orchestra, Hins Cheung X HKCO was cancelled due to the 2019 Hong Kong protests. The concert was successfully rescheduled for November 22, 2020. Hins became the first artist to perform at the Hong Kong Coliseum during the COVID-19 pandemic, with the attendee capacity limited at 50%.

On January 7, 2021, Cheung unexpectedly released his eighth Cantonese studio album The Brightest Darkness without any prior announcement. The 17-track album was released by Fitto Records. The music video for the lead single "The Way We Were" (俏郎君) was released to YouTube on the same day. "The Way We Were" went on to top five local music charts and won Ultimate Song Chart Awards Top Ten Songs Number 3, and Chill Club Song of the Year Number 5. The Brightest Darkness won Best Album at the Ultimate Song Chart Awards, making Cheung the second artist to have wins in all major categories at the Ultimate Song Chart Awards, after Jacky Cheung in 2005.

On October 19, 2021, Cheung posted on his YouTube channel a promotional video for his upcoming concert The Next 20 Hins Live in Hong Kong. Under the guidance of a professional rock climber, Cheung climbed the lighting rod atop Lee Garden Two in Causeway Bay, reaching 246m off the ground. The concert was scheduled for 18 shows starting December 23 at the Hong Kong Coliseum. Due to Hong Kong's fifth COVID-19 wave, shows scheduled for January 6 onward were rescheduled. On April 21, rescheduled show dates were announced, with an additional 8 shows to compensate for capacity limits.

On January 1, 2022, at the 2021 Ultimate Song Chart Awards Presentation, Cheung won the "Ultimate Male Singer Gold Award" for the fifth time, ranked 3rd in the "Ultimate Top Ten", and won the "Ultimate Album Award" for the first time. He became the sixth singer to achieve the "Ultimate Grand Slam" (including the Ultimate Male Singer Gold Award, Ultimate Song Award, Ultimate Album Award, My Favorite Male Singer Award, and My Favorite Song Award), and equaled the record set by Jacky Cheung 17 years ago, becoming the second singer to achieve the "Ultimate Gold Grand Slam" (including the Ultimate Singer-Songwriter Gold Award).

On May 10, 2022, it was announced that Cheung's 18-show New Year's Eve concert series at the Hong Kong Coliseum, titled "The Next 20 Hins Live in Hong Kong Hins Cheung Concert", would be postponed due to the government's tightening of epidemic prevention measures. Eight shows originally scheduled for January 6–10 and January 13–15, 2022, were to be postponed; However, as the government relaxed social distancing measures, Cheung's concerts resumed from May 10 to May 29. Due to social distancing measures, the attendance rate was limited to 50%, so the number of shows increased to 16 (from the 19th show onwards, it was relaxed to 85%), for a total of 26 shows, breaking his record for the number of shows in a solo concert. On May 29, the final show of the concert didn't officially end until 1:10 AM, breaking Eason Chan's record for the latest show to end at the Hong Kong Coliseum and becoming the singer with the longest encore at the Hong Kong Coliseum. The concert also invited a total of 58 guests, breaking the record set by Concert YY Wyman Wong's Works Exhibition, becoming the concert with the most guests at the Hong Kong Coliseum.

On July 17, 2022, Cheung's "Cherlas" became the number one song on five TV stations.

On November 8, 2022, Cheung posted on his social media account announcing that he would be holding 10 shows of the "Revisit Hins Cheung Concert" from December 20, 2022, to January 2, 2023, at Hall 5BC of the Hong Kong Convention and Exhibition Centre (Wan Chai). This concert series follows his 2021 "The Next 20 Hins Live in Hong Kong Hins Cheung Concert" and marks his second Christmas and New Year's Eve concert, providing a perfect ending to his 20th anniversary. On December 27, due to Cheung's preliminary positive diagnosis of COVID-19, he was required to undergo quarantine in accordance with relevant epidemic prevention regulations. Therefore, the five shows scheduled for December 27, 30, 31, January 1, and January 2, 2023 (a total of 5 shows) were postponed.

On January 11, 2023, Emperor Entertainment's Concert Department posted on its social media platform announcing that two concerts titled "The Prime Classics: Hins Live in London" would be held on March 16 and 17 at the Royal Albert Hall in London, UK. This would make Cheung the fourth Hong Kong singer to perform at this venue, following Roman Tam, Eason Chan, and Joey Yung. On January 19, due to overwhelming response, the organizers announced an additional show on March 18, bringing the total to three shows.

On April 19, 2023, Emperor Entertainment Group announced on social media that the "Revisit Hins Cheung Concert" would be postponed to June 13–17, 2023, with additional shows added on June 5–7 and 9–11 (a total of 6 shows), for a total of 11 shows. Tickets would go on sale to the public on April 24 at 10:00 AM through Express Tickets.

== Family background ==
Cheung comes from a family of civil servants in mainland China; two generations of his family have been vocalists.

Cheung's paternal grandfather was from Beijing, a graduate of the Engineering Department at Tsinghua University, and fluent in five languages. However, he lost his will to live due to criticism and struggle sessions during the Cultural Revolution, and eventually died of tuberculosis. Cheung's paternal grandmother was once an employee of a state-owned enterprise and loved Peking Opera. She later remarried. Cheung's step-grandfather was a teacher at the Guangzhou Peking Opera Troupe and was a leading drum master in Guangdong's Peking Opera circles at the time. Cheung's father was once the Party Secretary of the Dongshan District Street Office in Guangzhou and was skilled in playing the violin, trumpet, and bamboo flute.

== Discography ==
=== Studio albums ===
- Hins My Way (2002)
- A.M./P.M. (2004)
- Spring, Summer, Autumn, Winter (2006)
- The Book of Laughter and Forgetting (2006)
- Ardently Love (2007)
- Urban Emotions (2008)
- Love & Living (2009)
- No. Eleven (2010)
- Morph (2014)
- Felix - Me & Mr. Cheung (2015)
- Senses Inherited (2018)
- The Brightest Darkness (2021)

== Filmography ==
=== Feature films ===
- In-Laws, Out-Laws (2004)
- Moments of Love (2005)
- Love Is Not All Around (2007)
- Wonder Women (2007)
- Dancing Lion (2007)
- In the Name of... Love (2008)
- The Legend Is Born: Ip Man (2010)
- The Midas Touch (2013)
- Golden Chicken 3 (2014)
- Shining Moment (2017)
- Everything Under Control (2023)

=== Theatrical plays ===
- Big Nose (2006)
- Perfect Match (2008)
- Octave (2010)
- I Have a Date with Autumn (2012)
- Bent (2015)
- Equus (2016)

== Umbrella Movement involvement and Singer 2017 controversy ==
On January 10, 2017, Cheung was among the eight singers participating on the fifth season Hunan Television's reality competition I Am a Singer; for that season it was the first season to be renamed to the current and simplified title of Singer. However, prior to the announcement, Cheung revealed that he was still involved in the Umbrella Movement resulting in the dismay of his supporters and caused backlash on the Cheung's responsibility, in which he denied at the time.

On January 13, the show's official blog page removed all of Cheung's references and related articles. The following day, the blog for another Hunan TV series, Mango TV Divas (芒果台女汉子) broke the news for Cheung's involvement in the Umbrella Involvement and its impact; Cheung announced his withdrawal from Singer 2017 shortly after the news.

On January 17, four days before the season premiere, Cheung was announced to have withdrawn from the competition; Emperor Entertainment Group's spokesman reveal that they have terminated Cheung's involvement from his entertainment agency, and cited that Cheung's actions, whether correct or otherwise, had caused "great pressure on the singer and the TV station, and the singer himself can't concentrate on preparing for the contest", confirming his withdrawal, and his performance ("吻得太逼真") for the first episode (which was taped prior on January 10) were to be edited out of air (except for a part of the results which also involved another contestant, Teresa Carpio); per the rules of I Am a Singer for withdrawn singers (which has also happened for at least one singer from the first three seasons), Cheung was not allowed to have any further involvement in the show, and he was ineligible in participating Returning performances and Breakout rounds. As of the recent season in 2020, Cheung was the only contestant to have participated in the show but without any mention or appearance during the show's air entirely. However, it was revealed on February on the same year, Cheung was cleared on the controversy and was reinstated in the media agency.

On 9 April 2026, the Hong Kong newspaper Wen Wei Po published an interview with Cheung, announcing his role as a volunteer mentor for a Security Bureau rehabilitation programme aimed at youth arrested during the 2019 protests. Concurrently, media outlets reported that Cheung had unfollowed nearly 1,000 accounts on Instagram, including fellow Cantopop singers and his official fan club.
