= Lin Xi =

Hong Kong lyricist and writer

- 林夕
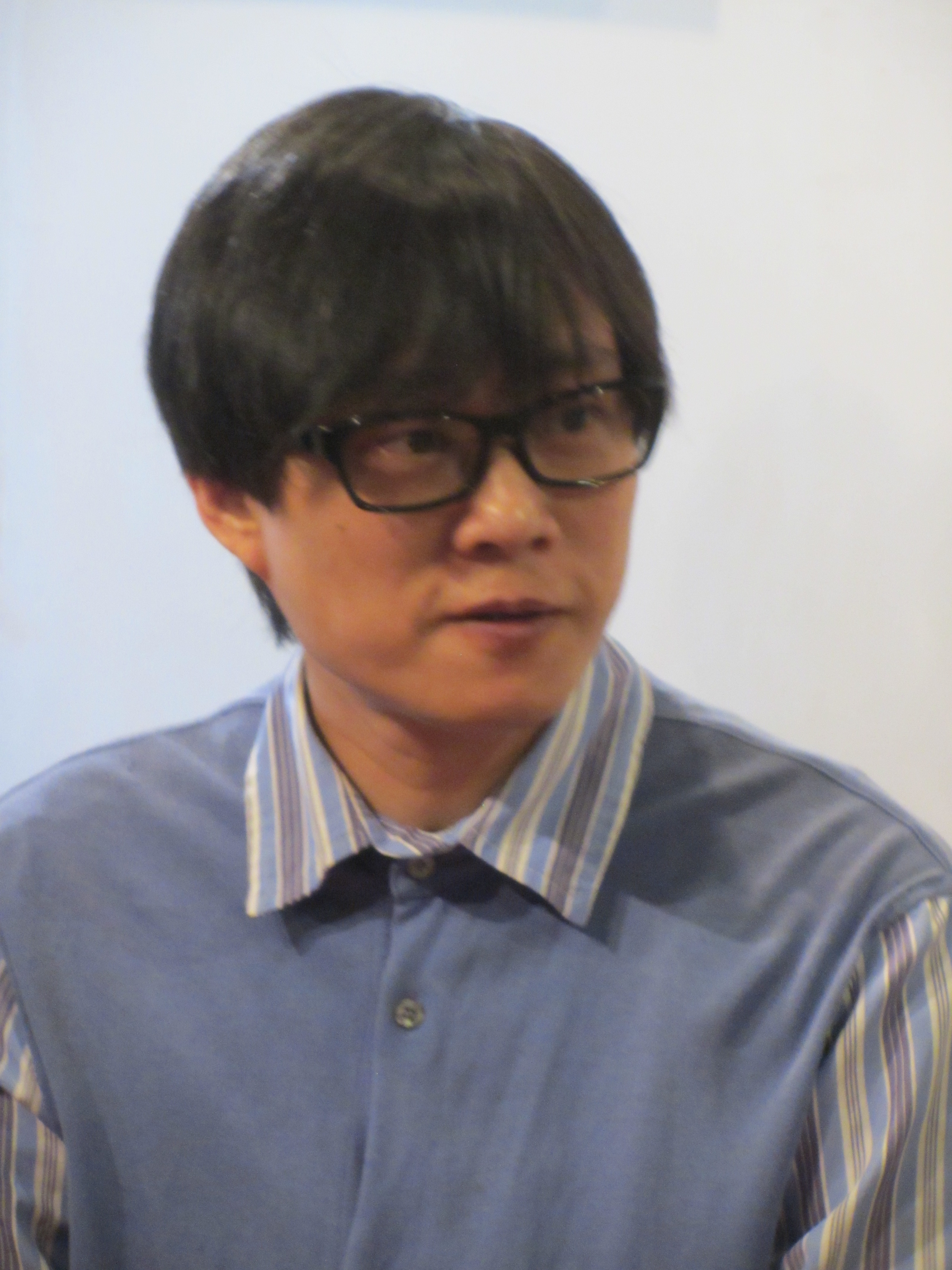
- Lin in 2013
- Born: Leung Wai Man (梁偉文); 7 December 1961 (age 64); British Hong Kong
- Other name: God of Lyrics (詞神)
- Citizenship: Hong Kong; Taiwan
- Education: University of Hong Kong (BA)
- Occupations: Lyricist; writer
- Awards: Golden Needle Award; 2008 Lifetime Achievement

Chinese name
- Chinese: 林夕
Transcriptions
Standard Mandarin
- Hanyu Pinyin: Lín Xī
Yue: Cantonese
- Jyutping: Lam4 Zik6

Birth name
- Traditional Chinese: 梁偉文
- Simplified Chinese: 梁伟文
Transcriptions
Yue: Cantonese
- Jyutping: Loeng4 Wai5man4
- Musical career
- Also known as: Lam Zik
- Origin: Hong Kong
- Genres: Cantopop; Mandopop

Albert Leung Wai Man (traditional Chinese: 梁偉文; simplified Chinese: 梁伟文; Jyutping: Loeng4 Wai5 Man4, born 7 December 1961), better known by his pen name Lin Xi (Chinese: 林夕; Jyutping: Lam4 Zik6), is a Hong Kong and Taiwanese lyricist and writer. A prominent figure in Cantopop and Mandopop, he has written lyrics for nearly all major Hong Kong singers, with notable collaborations with Leslie Cheung, Faye Wong, Anthony Wong, Eason Chan, and Miriam Yeung. His lyrics are known for their poetic style, psychological depth, and social commentary. From 1995 to 2003, he won the Lyricist of the Year award at the Ultimate Song Chart Awards for nine consecutive years, making him the lyricist with the longest winning streak for this accolade. He went on to win the same award again for four consecutive years from 2006 to 2009. He also won the Golden Melody Award for Best Lyricist twice in 1999 and 2010. In 2009, he was honored with the Golden Needle Award, the highest distinction in the Hong Kong music industry.

After attending a rally against Hong Kong's moral and national education plan in 2012, Leung became active in social movements. Since 2017, he has been blacklisted in mainland China for his support for the democracy movement in Hong Kong. He moved to Taiwan in 2015 and became a citizen in 2021.

== Education ==
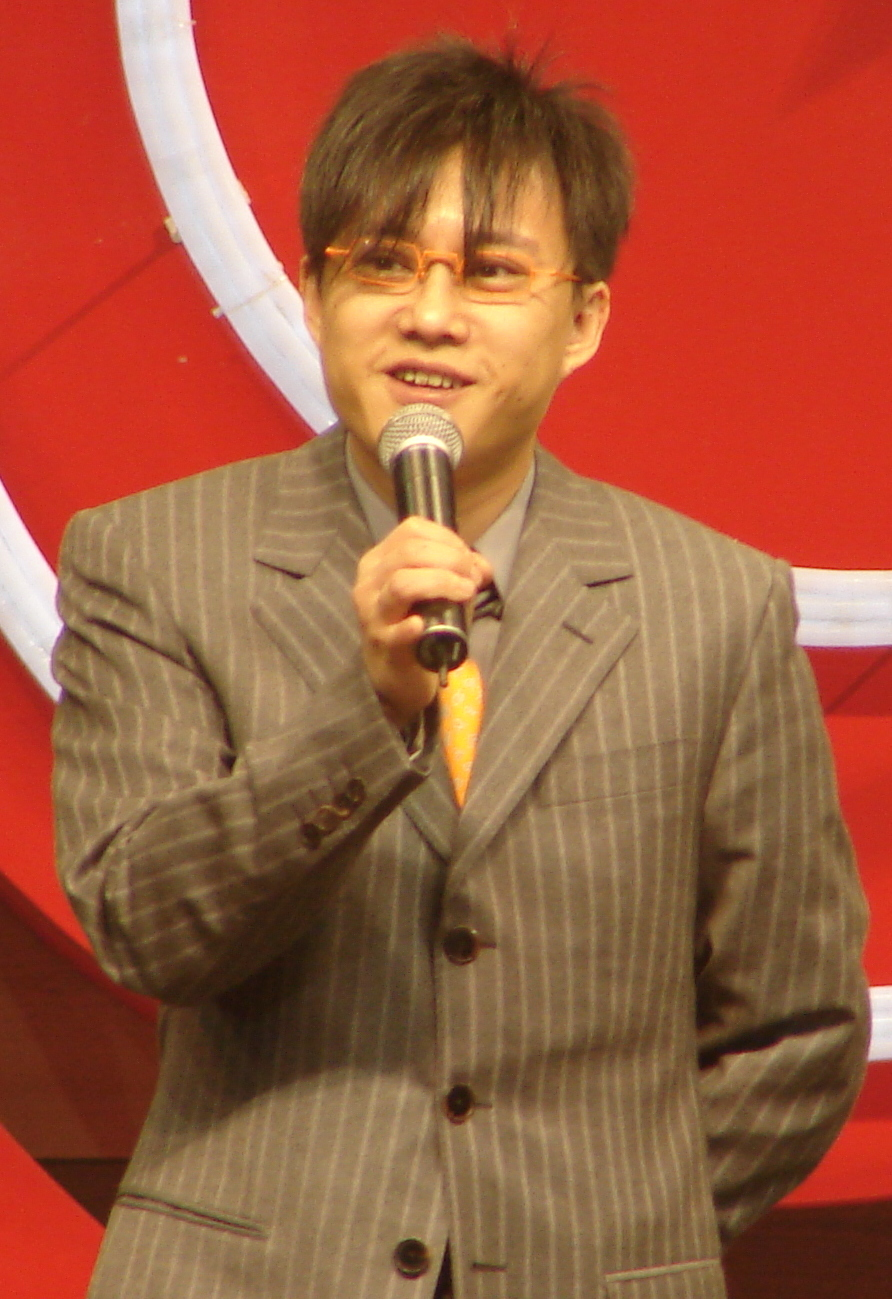
Leung in 2007

Leung attended all-boy secondary schools in Kowloon at Chan Sui Ki (La Salle) College and La Salle College. He received a bachelor of arts with a major in translation studies from the University of Hong Kong in 1984.

== Career ==
Leung has been a lyricist since 1985. His pen name, 林夕, comes from the last name of lyricist Richard Lam and the simplified Chinese character 梦 (meaning "dream"). He has written over 4,000 song lyrics and is known for his ability to compose lyrics quickly. On TVB's show Be My Guest, he admitted that his fastest record for writing the complete lyrics to a song is 45 minutes. He has also published over ten books, including his essays and poems.

He composed the lyrics for one of the theme songs of the 2008 Beijing Olympics, "Beijing Welcomes You", performed by a panoply of popular Chinese singers. In 2014, he described the experience as a "blemish" of his life for serving as an official mouthpiece. After the 2014 Umbrella Movement, he relocated to Taiwan and became a citizen in 2021. Since 2017, he has been blacklisted in mainland China and criticized by state media for his support for the Hong Kong democracy movement. In November 2019, over thousands of songs written by him were taken down from online music stores, but were restored later.

== Personal life ==
Leung was raised a Christian but converted to Buddhism, while he also has an interest in Taoism, especially Tao Te Ching. He often incorporates Buddhist and Taoist ideas into his lyrics.

He came out as gay in 2006 in an interview with his friend Johnnie To.
