= Prudence Liew singles discography =

- Singles: 47
- Other charted songs: 4
- Guest appearances: 4

The singles discography of Hong Kong singer Prudence Liew consists of 47 singles, as well as 4 non-single tracks that charted on airplay charts, and 4 appearances as a guest vocalist. Working as a film producer, Liew was signed as the flagship artist to Current Records in 1986 after releasing her single, "午夜情 (Midnight Love)" for the movie 午夜麗人 Midnight Beauties. She released her self-titled debut album in December that year which included her signature song and second single, "最後一夜 (The Last Night)" and sold 500,000 copies, certifying 10× platinum by the Hong Kong IFPI. Liew has released 8 albums with 24 singles under the Current Records/BMG Pacific label before signing with Columbia Records in 1992 and releasing four more albums, which spawned 10 singles before going on hiatus in 1995.

In 2000, Liew briefly returned to the music scene, albeit in Taiwan where she released her first mandopop album 愛自己 Love Yourself which had one chart-topping single, "每次我都很認真 (Everytime, I Take It Very Seriously)". In 2008, she returned to the Hong Kong music industry, signing with Universal Music Group label Cinepoly Records and continued to release Cantonese and Mandarin albums, each spawning Top 10 singles.

== Singles ==
=== 1980s – 1990s ===
Single	Year	Airplay peak chart positions				Album
Single	Year	TVB	903	RTHK	997^{[A]}	Album
"午夜情 (Midnight Love)"	1986	6	1	1	NIL	Prudence Liew
"最後一夜 (The Last Night)"	1986	4	1	1	NIL	Prudence Liew
"霓虹鳥 (Neon Bird)"	1987	—	7	5	NIL	Prudence Liew
"亞熱帶少年 Subtropical Boy"	1987	9	3	1	NIL	Prudence Liew
"Mind Made Up"	1987	—	8	5	NIL	Prudence Liew
"Man in the Moon"	1987	7	2	4	NIL	Why
"一對舊皮鞋 (A Pair of Old Loafers)"	1987	6	2	1	NIL	Why
"點解 Why"	1988	4	1	1	NIL	Why
"這雙眼只望你 (Can't Take My Eyes Off You)"	1988	1	3	2	NIL	Why
"Give Me All Your Love, Boy"	1988	—	7	12	NIL	Why
"公子多情 (Loving Prince)"	1988	1	1	2	NIL	Loving Prince
"一見鍾情 (Love at First Sight)"	1989	1	3	1	NIL	Loving Prince
"廣播道神話 (The Legend of Broadcast Drive)"	1989	—	5	3	NIL	Loving Prince
"愛是無涯 (Love Has No Boundaries)"	1989	1	2	3	NIL	Jokingly Saying
"街邊派對 (Street Side Party)"	1989	–	8	8	NIL	Jokingly Saying
"有人 (Someone)"	1989	—	12	16	NIL	Jokingly Saying
"我估不到 (I Could Not Have Guessed)"	1990	1	1	1	NIL	The Naked Feeling
"玩玩 (Play Play)"	1990	3	3	2	NIL	The Naked Feeling
"事後 (Afterwards)"	1990	—	—^{[B]}	5	NIL	The Naked Feeling
"依依 (Linger)"	1990	1	1	1	NIL	Linger
"這麼那麼怎麼 (This, That, How?)"	1991	3	5	3	NIL	Linger
"午夜傳真 (Midnight Fax)"	1991	—	14	18	NIL	Linger
"天長地久 (Forever and Eternal)"	1991	2	2	2	NIL	Listen to Me
"夜已變得騷了 (The Night Has Become Horny)"	1991	6	4	–	NIL	Listen to Me
"各自各… 精彩 (Each Shining Their Own Way)"	1991	6	1	1	NIL	Not a Little Girl Anymore
"小驚大怪 (Little Scare, Big Reaction)"	1992	—	10	5	NIL	Not a Little Girl Anymore
"娃娃歲月 (The Ages of a Little Girl)"	1992	—	7	6	NIL	Not a Little Girl Anymore
"舊曲新愁 (Old Song, New Sorrow)"	1992	5	2	7	NIL	Autumn Heart
"你的雙眼如深秋 (Your Eyes Are Like a Deep Autumn)"	1992	—	9	14	NIL	Autumn Heart
"再讓我望你多一回 (Let Me Look at You One More Time)"	1993	—	16	14	NIL	Autumn Heart
"嬉戲號客機 (Flight Playtime)"	1993	1	2	1	NIL	Spoiled by You
"最騷的夢 (The Horniest Dream)"	1993	—	18	5	NIL	Spoiled by You
"被你縱壞 (Spoiled By You)"	1994	—	11	8	10	Spoiled by You
"糊塗族人 (Silly Tribesmen)"	1994	1	2	2	2	Thoughts in the Night, Dreams During the Day
"—" denotes releases that did not chart or were not released to that station.

=== 2000s – present ===
Single	Year	Airplay peak chart positions					Album
Single	Year	903	RTHK	997	MOOV Top 100^{[C]}	TW	Album
"每次我都很認真 (Everytime, I Take It Very Seriously)"	2000	—	—	—	NIL	1	Love Yourself
"大開色界 (Opening the Sexual Boundaries)" (featuring Jan Lamb)	2008	1	1	2	NIL	—	Opening the Sexual Boundaries
"浮花 (Floating Flower)"	2008	1	3	—	NIL	—	Opening the Sexual Boundaries
"私人補習 (Private Tutor)"	2008	—	13	—	NIL	—	Opening the Sexual Boundaries
"最後一夜 (The Last Night) [Studio Ballad Version]"	2008	—	—	—	NIL	—	Opening the Sexual Boundaries Concert CD
"蝙蝠 (Bat)"	2009	10	1	2	NIL	—	The Queen of Hardships
"雪泥 (Slush)"	2009	2	6	2	NIL	—	The Queen of Hardships
"認錯 (Apologize)"	2011	18	12	5	NIL	—	Love Addict
"走鋼索的人 (A Tightrope Walker)"	2011	—	—	4	NIL	—	Love Addict
"怪你過份美麗 (Blaming You For Being Too Beautiful)"	2012	—	—	—	14	—	Stolen Moments
"戀愛大過天 (Loving is More Important Than the Sky)"	2012	—	—	—	6	—	Stolen Moments
"烈燄紅唇 (Red Hot Lips)"	2012	—	—	—	35	—	Stolen Moments
"兩杯茶 (Two Cups of Tea)"	2015	—	—	—	28	—	non-album single
"I'll Have to Say I Love You in a Song"	2017	1	—	—	—	—	Reincarnated Love
"Torn Between Two Lovers" (duet with Gin Lee)	2017	4	7	9	—	—	Reincarnated Love
"—" denotes releases that did not chart or were not released to that station/country.

== Other charted songs ==
Song	Year	MOOV Top 100	Album
"明知故犯 (Knowingly Commit the Crime)"	2012	79	Stolen Moments
"小城大事 (Big Matters in a Small Town)"	2012	88	Stolen Moments
"春光乍洩 (Baring All)"	2012	92	Stolen Moments
"灰色 (Gray)"	2012	98	Stolen Moments
"—" denotes releases that did not chart or were not released to that station/country.

== Guest appearances ==
Single	Year	Airplay peak chart positions				Album	Album Artist
Single	Year	TVB	903	RTHK	997	Album	Album Artist
"偷窺 (Peeking)" (duet with Bowie Lam)	1989	5	5	9	NIL^{[A]}	Natural	Bowie Lam
"大開眼戒 (Opening the Taboos of Vision)"	2005	—	3	6	12	Wyman Wong After Ten Greatest Hits Collection	Wyman Wong (featuring various artists)
"新浪漫 (New Romance)" (Jan Lamb featuring Prudence Liew)	2005	—	7	—	—	Thirties	Jan Lamb
"人人英雄 (Everyone is a Hero)" (group song with Alan Tam, Hacken Lee, Eason Chan, Kay Tse, Kelly Chen, Hins Cheung, Eric Suen, Patrick Tang, Swing, Mr., Keeva Mak, Eva Chan)	2009	—	4	—	—	Uni-Power: Creating Big Power Singing Together	Universal Music Hong Kong Artists
"—" denotes releases that did not chart or were not released to that station/country.

Notes

- A Metro Broadcast Corporation Limited was not established until 1994, therefore no singles had chart positions beforehand in this column and are marked with NIL.
- B The song Afterwards 事後, which deals with sexual pleasure, was banned by RTHK Radio 2 due to its explicit nature.
- C MOOV Hong Kong Top 100 Singles Chart, measuring the downloads and online airplay of songs in Hong Kong, was not established until 2012, therefore no singles had chart positions beforehand in this column and are marked with NIL.
