= Prudence Liew albums discography =

Prudence Liew discography
- Studio albums: 15
- Extended plays: 1
- Live albums: 1
- Compilation albums: 7
- Video albums: 1
- Other appearances: 18

This is the discography of Hong Kong singer Prudence Liew. Liew has released 13 cantopop albums and two mandopop albums since her debut in 1986. Her albums have been certified multi-platinum by the Hong Kong IFPI, with her eponymous debut album, Prudence Liew selling over 500,000 copies, certifying 10× platinum.

After releasing 11 studio albums for BMG Music and later Columbia Records, Liew took a hiatus from 1995 to 2000 and relocated to San Francisco, USA following her first divorce. In 2000, she signed with Taiwan record label, Rock Records to release her first mandopop album, Love Yourself.

Liew once again fell off the radar until 2008, when she announced a comeback concert series in Hong Kong and signed with Universal Music label, Cinepoly Records.

In 2009, Liew released her first cantopop studio album of 15 years titled, The Queen of Hardships which peaked at the top spot on the HMV Hong Kong Asian Sales Chart upon its debut. The album also spawned two top ten radio airplay singles.

In the 2010s, Liew is releasing a set of three audiophile cover albums, in three different languages. In June 2011, she released her second Mandarin-language album Love Addict consisting of mandopop ballads originally sung by male artists. In July 2012, Liew released a Cantonese cover album entitled Stolen Moments. Liew plans of recording an English cover album to be released in 2013.

== Studio albums ==
Year	Album details	Chart peak positions		Certifications (sales thresholds)
Year	Album details	HK	TW	Certifications (sales thresholds)
1986	劉美君 Prudence Liew: Released: 23 December 1986; Label: Current Records (#280001); Formats: CD, CS, LP record	1	—	HK: 10× Platinum
1987	點解 Why: Released: November 1987; Label: Current Records (#280005); Formats: CD, CS, LP record	1	—	HK: 6× Platinum
1988	公子多情 Loving Prince: Released: October 1988; Label: Current Records (#280012); Formats: CD, CS, LP record	1	—	HK: Platinum
1989	笑說 Jokingly Saying: Released: August 1989; Label: BMG Pacific/Current Records (#280017); Formats: CD, CS, LP record	1	—	HK: Platinum
1990	赤裸感覺 The Naked Feeling: Released: January 1990; Label: BMG Pacific/Current Records (#280038); Formats: CD, CS, LP record	3	—	HK: Gold
1990	依依 Linger: Released: September 1990; Label: BMG Pacific/Current Records (#280046); Formats: CD, CS, LP record	5	—	
1991	聽我細訴 Listen to Me: Released: February 1991; Label: BMG Pacific/Current Records (#280058); Formats: CD, CS, LP record	8	—	
1992	不再娃娃 Not a Little Girl Anymore: Released: January 1992; Label: Columbia Records (SML 6012); Formats: CD, CS	7	—	
1992	秋心 Autumn Heart: Released: December 1992; Label: Columbia Records (SML 6017); Formats: CD, CS	—	—	
1993	被你縱壞 Spoiled by You: Released: September 1993; Label: Columbia Records (SML 6024); Formats: CD, CS	—	—	
1994	夜有所思，日有所夢 Thoughts in the Night, Dreams During the Day: Released: 1 December 1994; Label: Columbia Records (SML 6037); Formats: CD, CS	—	—	
2000	愛自己 Love Yourself: Released: 1 May 2000; Label: Rock Records (RD-1543); Formats: CD, Digital download	—	10	
2009	The Queen of Hardships: Released: 22 October 2009; Label: Cinepoly Records (#2722469); Formats: CD, Digital download	1	—	
2011	Love Addict: Released: 17 June 2011; Label: Cinepoly Records (#8899758); Formats: CD, Digital download	1	—	HK: Gold
2012	偷 Stolen Moments: Released: 6 July 2012; Label: Cinepoly Records (#8898391); Formats: CD, Digital download	2	—	
2017	Reincarnated Love: Released: 19 July 2017; Label: Cinepoly Records (#8860955); Formats: CD, Digital download	1	—	
"—" denotes releases that did not chart or were not released in that country.

== Live albums ==
Year	Album details	Chart peak positions
Year	Album details	HK
2008	大開色界演唱會 Opening the Sexual Boundaries Concert CD: Released: 29 May 2008; Label: Cinepoly Records (#1774906); Formats: CD	11

== Compilation albums ==
Year	Album details	Chart peak positions
Year	Album details	HK
1988	Hit Mix: Released: 1988; Label: Current Records (#280020); Formats: CD, CS, LP	-
1989	Remixes: Released: 1989; Label: Current Records (#280030); Formats: CD, CS, LP	-
1990-1991	Love & Passion / Love & Passion 2: Released: 1990 (Love & Passion) / 1991 (Love & Passion 2); Label: BMG Pacific (#280056/280073); Formats: CD, CS, LP	-
1991	香港情 / 香港情未了 Hong Kong Love / Hong Kong Love Continued: Released: 1991; Label: BMG Pacific (#280074/280076); Formats: CD, CS, LP	-
2008	大開色界 (新曲+精選) Opening the Sexual Boundaries: Released: 11 April 2008; Label: Cinepoly Records (#1765930); Formats: CD, Digital download	1

== Extended plays ==
Year	Album details	Chart peak positions
Year	Album details	HK
1989	緣 Fate: Released: 1989; Label: Current Records (#280033); Formats: CD, CS	-

== Video albums ==
Year	Album details	Chart peak positions
Year	Album details	HK
2008	大開色界演唱會DVD Opening the Sexual Boundaries Concert DVD: Released: 21 July 2008; Label: Cinepoly Records; Formats: DVD, VCD	7

== Other appearances ==
Year	Song	Album appearance	Album artist	Notes
1987	"東方禿鷹 (Eastern Condors)" (group song with Yuen Biao, Ka-Lee Ho, Rosanne Lui, Sammo Hung, Kin-Chung Wu, Joyce Godenzi, Nam-Kwong Lau)	Eastern Condors OST	Various artists	Theme song to motion picture Eastern Condors
1989	"偷窺 (Peeking)" (duet with Bowie Lam)	Natural	Bowie Lam	
1989	"Sealed with a Kiss"	現代點唱機 (Current Jukebox)	Various artists	Cantonese cover entitled "Somebody" recorded in Jokingly Saying
1990	"踏上成長路 (Stepping onto the Growing Road)" (quintet with Jacky Cheung, Sandy Lam, Andy Lau, Alex To)	香港心連心 (Hong Kong Joined in Hearts)	Various artists	Charity song released by Radio Television Hong Kong
1990	"暖火 (Warm Fire)" (group song with Fundamental, Bowie Lam, Shui-Fun Cheng, Raymond Choi, Vivian Lai)	暖火1990 (Warm Fire 1990)	Various artists	
1996	"I Swear" (quartet with Sandy Lam, Teresa Carpio, Chyi Yu)	愛是唯一 (Love is the Only One)	Sandy Lam	
1997	"What a Wonderful World" (trio with Sandy Lam, Chyi Yu)	美妙世界 (Wonderful World)	Sandy Lam	
2002	"漣漪 (Ripple)"	Salute deux	Various artists	Cover of Danny Chan song
2002	"人間道 (倩女幽魂) (The Taoism Road)"	Salute deux	Various artists	Cover of Leslie Cheung song and theme to A Chinese Ghost Story
2002	"天籟... 星河傳說 (Perfection... The Legend of the Milky Way)"	Salute deux	Various artists	Cover of Michael Kwan song
2002	"無奈 (Helpless)"	Salute deux	Various artists	Cover of Paula Tsui song
2005	"大開眼戒 (Opening the Taboos of Vision)"	黃偉文 After Ten 十年選 (Wyman Wong After Ten Greatest Hits Collection)	Various artists	Cover of Eason Chan song
2005	"新浪漫 (New Romance)" (Jan Lamb featuring Prudence Liew)	三字頭 (Thirties)	Jan Lamb	
2009	"人人英雄 (Everyone is a Hero)" (group song with Alan Tam, Hacken Lee, Eason Chan, Kay Tse, Kelly Chen, Hins Cheung, Eric Suen, Patrick Tang, Swing, Mister, Keeva Mak, Eva Chan)	Uni-Power 合唱造大力量 (Uni-Power: Creating Big Power Singing Together)	Universal Music Hong Kong Artists	Concept album created by Universal Music Hong Kong to boost the spirit in Hong Kong
2009	"婦人之見 (The Views of a Woman)" (quartet with Kelly Chen, Keeva Mak, Eva Chan)	Uni-Power 合唱造大力量 (Uni-Power: Creating Big Power Singing Together)	Universal Music Hong Kong Artists	Concept album created by Universal Music Hong Kong to boost the spirit in Hong Kong
2009	"怪誕之城 (The Weird City)" (trio with Swing)	Uni-Power 合唱造大力量 (Uni-Power: Creating Big Power Singing Together)	Universal Music Hong Kong Artists	Concept album created by Universal Music Hong Kong to boost the spirit in Hong Kong
2009	"保衛地球 (Protecting Earth)" (group song with Alan Tam, Hacken Lee, Eason Chan, Kay Tse, Kelly Chen, Hins Cheung, Eric Suen, Patrick Tang, Swing, Mister, Keeva Mak, Eva Chan)	Uni-Power 合唱造大力量 (Uni-Power: Creating Big Power Singing Together)	Universal Music Hong Kong Artists	Concept album created by Universal Music Hong Kong to boost the spirit in Hong Kong
2012	"左右手 (My Left & Right Hands)"	ReImagine Leslie Cheung	Universal Music Hong Kong Artists	Tribute album to Leslie Cheung
