= Opening the Sexual Boundaries =

Opening the Sexual Boundaries 大開色界新曲+精選

Greatest hits album by Prudence Liew
- Released: April 11, 2008
- Genre: Cantopop
- Label: Cinepoly
- Producer: Prudence Liew; Jerald Chan

Prudence Liew chronology
愛自己 (Love Yourself) (2000)	Opening the Sexual Boundaries 大開色界新曲+精選 (2008)	大開色界演唱會CD (Opening the Sexual Boundaries Concert CD) (2008)

Singles from Opening the Sexual Boundaries
- 1. "大開色界 Opening the Sexual Boundaries" Released: January 5, 2008; 2. "浮花 The Floating Flower" Released: March 1, 2008; 3. "私人補習 Private Tutor" Released: May 17, 2008

大開色界新曲+精選 Opening the Sexual Boundaries is a greatest hits compilation album by cantopop singer Prudence Liew, released on April 11, 2008.

== Album details ==
This compilation was released to promote the concert series of the same name held at the Hong Kong Coliseum on April 19, & April 20, 2008. The concerts marked the first time Liew had a solo concert series at the venue and also her first official concert since she went on hiatus back in 1995. This 2-disc set contains 31 songs spanning from the Current Records/BMG Music era in the late 1980s to the Columbia Records era in the mid 1990s to the Taiwan release of the mandopop album 愛自己 Love Yourself in 2000 on Rock Records. Also included are three new songs, with the title track serving as a comeback anthem for Liew and a preview of her concert. The track "浮花 (Floating Flower)" also serves as the theme song to the motion picture, True Women for Sale, in which Liew is the lead. The album also comes with a bonus DVD with music videos of the three new tracks.

Liew's co-producer of this compilation is Jerald Chan, member of the musical group Swing. Coincidentally, he is the son of Joseph Chan, Liew's early collaborator and producer of her first four studio albums from Prudence Liew to Jokingly Saying.

== Track listings ==
Disc 1

1. 大開色界 ("Opening the Sexual Boundaries"; featuring Jan Lamb)
2. 浮花 ("The Floating Flower")
3. 私人補習 ("Private Tutor")
4. 最後一夜 ("The Last Night")
5. 這雙眼只望你 ("Can't Take My Eyes Off You")
6. "Tell You My Story"
7. 嬉戲號客機 ("Flight Playtime")
8. "Give Me All Your Love, Boy"
9. 偷窺 ("Peeking"; duet with Bowie Lam)
10. 清晨 ("Early Morning")
11. 午夜情 ("Midnight Love")
12. 你說是甜我說苦 ("Your Words Are Sweet, Mine Are Bitter")
13. 新浪漫 ("New Romance"; duet with Jan Lamb)
14. 亞熱帶少年 ("Subtropical Boy")
15. "Touch Me Feel Me"
16. 事後 ("Afterwards")
17. 夜已變得騷了 ("The Night Has Become Horny")

Disc 2

1. 娃娃歲月 ("The Ages of Little Girl")
2. 大開眼戒 ("Opening the Taboos of Vision")
3. 隔 ("Separated")
4. 自甘墮落 ("Self-Deserved Demise")
5. 異鄉邂逅 ("Encounter in a Foreign Land")
6. 一對舊皮鞋 ("A Pair of Old Loafers")
7. 愛是無涯 ("Love Has No Boundaries")
8. 我估不到 ("I Could Not Have Guessed")
9. 惆悵滄桑夜 ("Troublesome, Depressing Night")
10. 這麼那麼怎麼 ("This, That, How?")
11. 一見鍾情 ("Love at First Sight")
12. 蠢動 ("Urging to Move")
13. 依依 ("Lingering")
14. 新年願望 ("New Year Resolution")
15. 再讓我望你多一回 ("Let Me Look at You One More Time")
16. 被你縱壞 ("Spoiled By You")
17. 死心塌地 ("Devoted")

Bonus Music Video DVD

1. 大開色界 ("Opening the Sexual Boundaries"; music video)
2. 浮花 ("The Floating Flower"; music video)
3. 私人補習 ("Private Tutor"; music video)

== Chart positions ==
=== Album ===
Chart name	Peak position
HMV Hong Kong Asian Sales Chart	1
HMV Hong Kong Cantonese/Mandarin Sales Chart	1

=== Singles (radio airplay) ===
Song title	Release date	903	RTHK	997
大開色界 ("Opening the Sexual Boundaries")	01/05/2008	1	1	2
浮花 ("Floating Flower")	03/01/2008	1	3	-
私人補習 ("Private Tutor")	05/17/2008	-	13	-
"—" denotes releases that did not chart or were not released to that station.
