= Remixes (Prudence Liew album) =

Remix album by Prudence Liew
- Released: 1989; June 2, 2006 (re-issue)
- Recorded: 1986–1988
- Genre: Cantopop, dance-pop
- Length: 49:20
- Label: Current (1989); Sony BMG (2006 re-issue)
- Producer: Joseph Chan

Prudence Liew chronology
緣 Fate (1989)	Remixes (1989)	笑說 Jokingly Saying (1989)

Remixes is a remix compilation album by cantopop singer Prudence Liew, released in 1989.

== Background information ==
As Liew was pregnant with her second child after the release of Loving Prince 公子多情, she was on maternity leave for much of 1989. To tie fans over until the release of her next album, Jokingly Saying 笑說, Current Records released an EP titled Fate 緣, and this remix album with songs spanning from her debut album Prudence Liew 劉美君 to Loving Prince 公子多情.

== Track listing ==
No.	Title	Lyrics	Music	Length
1.	"一見鍾情 (Love at First Sight)" (Remixed Version)	Cheuk Fai Lau	Lennon–McCartney	5:28
2.	"亞熱帶少年 Subtropical Boy" (Subtropical Mix)	Yu Yeen	Hon-Jen Gi	5:35
3.	"Give Me All Your Love, Boy" (Remixed Version)	Richard Lam	Richard Yung	7:10
4.	"最後一夜 (The Last Night)" (Disco Re-Arranged Version)	Richard Lam	T. Hendrik, K. Van Harren, M. Applegate	6:47
5.	"霓虹鳥 (Neon Bird)" (Disco Re-Arranged Version)	Yuen Leung Poon	Joseph Chan	6:49
6.	"Mind Made Up" (Extended Mix)	Joey Ou	Richard Yung	5:36
7.	"這雙眼只望你 (Can't Take My Eyes Off You)" (Remixed Version)	Richard Lam	Bob Crewe, Bob Gaudio	7:17
8.	"點解 (Why?)" (Remixed Version)	Albert Leung	Neil Tennant, Chris Lowe, Allee Willis	4:38
Total length:				49:20
