= Love & Passion =

Greatest hits album by Prudence Liew
- Released: 1990
- Recorded: 1986–1990
- Genre: Cantopop
- Label: BMG Pacific

Prudence Liew chronology
依依 Linger (1990)	Love & Passion (1990)	聽我細訴 Listen to Me (1991)

Love & Passion 2

Greatest hits album by Prudence Liew
- Released: 1991
- Recorded: 1986-1990
- Genre: Cantopop
- Label: BMG Pacific

Prudence Liew chronology
聽我細訴 Listen to Me (1991)	Love & Passion 2 (1991)	Hong Kong Love 香港情 (1991)

Love & Passion is a series of two greatest hits compilation albums by cantopop singer Prudence Liew, released between 1990 and 1991, bookending the release of her studio album 聽我細訴 Listen to Me.

== Album details ==
This compilation was released in two parts. The first, Love & Passion was released in 1990 prior to the release of Listen to Me, which was to be Liew's final album with BMG Pacific/Current Records before her departure to Columbia Records. The second installment, Love & Passion 2 was released the next year to counteract her debut from Columbia Records. However, Columbia Records has yet to release her studio album 不再娃娃 Not a Little Girl Anymore by the time Love & Passion 2 was on the market; therefore, BMG Pacific released another set of compilation albums, the Hong Kong Love series.

== Track listings ==
=== Love & Passion (1990) ===
1. 午夜情 (Midnight Love)
2. 公子多情 (Loving Prince)
3. 一見鍾情 (Love at First Sight)
4. 依依 (Lingering)
5. 我估不到 (I Could Not Have Guessed)
6. 愛是無涯 (Love Has No Boundaries)
7. 蠢動 (Urging to Move)
8. 有誰知我此時情 (Who Would Know My Feelings Now)
9. 假裝 (Pretending)
10. 你說是甜我說苦 (Your Words Are Sweet, Mine Are Bitter)
11. Man in the Moon
12. 為你而生 (Living For You)

=== Love & Passion 2 (1991) ===
1. 最後一夜 (The Last Night)
2. 這雙眼只望你 (Can't Take My Eyes Off You)
3. 生活一小時 (Living For One Hour)
4. 玩玩 (Play Play)
5. 午夜傳真 (Midnight Fax)
6. 貼面舞 (Face-to-Face Dance)
7. 天長地久 (Forever and Eternal)
8. 這麼那麼怎麼 (This, That, How?)
9. 來吧 (Come On)
10. 慢鏡 (Slow-Motion)
11. 討厭 (Annoying)
12. 點解 (Why?)
13. 惆悵滄桑夜 (Troublesome, Depressing Night)
