= Spoiled by You =

Spoiled By You 被你縱壞

Studio album by Prudence Liew
- Released: September 1993
- Recorded: 1992–1993
- Genre: Cantopop
- Label: Columbia
- Producer: Prudence Liew

Prudence Liew chronology
| 秋心 Autumn Heart (1992) | Spoiled By You 被你縱壞 (1993) | 夜有所思，日有所夢 Thoughts in the Night, Dreams During the Day (1994) |

Singles from 被你縱壞 Spoiled By You
- 1. "嬉戲號客機 (Flight Playtime)"; 2. "最騷的夢 (The Horniest Dream)"; 3. "被你縱壞 (Spoiled By You)"

被你縱壞 Spoiled By You is the tenth studio album of cantopop singer Prudence Liew, released in September 1993.

== Background information ==
This album brings Liew back to the days of The Naked Feeling of songs that deal with sexual imagery, however, this time it is done with an upbeat teasing way throughout most of the songs. The lead single, "嬉戲號客機 (Flight Playtime)" is a playful song that asks the listener to join her on a flight of pleasure and tease. The album also saw Liew taking on slightly jazz themes in her music as she is credited in five of the ten songs for arranging vocal ad lib.

== Track listing ==
1. 嬉戲號客機 (Flight Playtime)
2. 敏感 (Sensitive)
3. 意外 (Accident)
4. 搔我心底癢 (Itching My Heart's Desires)
5. 最騷的夢 (The Horniest Dream)
6. 被你縱壞 (Spoiled By You)
7. 唇情 (Loving Lips)
8. 不可能說的夢 (The Unspeakable Dreams)
9. 夜長夢多 (Plenty of Dreams Throughout the Long Night)
10. 你望我望你 (You Looking at Me Looking at You)
