= Two Cups of Tea =

"兩杯茶"

Single by Prudence Liew
- Released: January 27, 2015
- Recorded: 2014
- Genre: Cantopop
- Length: 4:17
- Label: Cinepoly
- Songwriter(s): Chi Yeung; Lin Xi

Prudence Liew singles chronology
""戀愛大過天; Loving is More Important Than the Sky"" (2012)	"兩杯茶" (2015)	"I'll Have to Say I Love You in a Song" (2017)
- "兩杯茶 Two Cups of Tea"

Two Cups of Tea (Chinese: 兩杯茶; pinyin: Liǎng bēi chá; Cantonese Yale: Léuhng būi chàh) is a Cantonese language song by Hong Kong singer Prudence Liew. It was released on January 27, 2015, by Cinepoly Records and Universal Music Hong Kong. The song also serves as the theme song to the Hong Kong Television Network drama series To Be or Not to Be.

== Release ==
The song was released as a single in the Hong Kong iTunes store for digital download on January 27, 2015, one week after the finale airing of To Be or Not to Be. It is not known whether this will be the lead single of Liew's next Cantopop album.

=== Commercial performance ===
In its first week of release in Hong Kong, "Two Cups of Tea" debuted and peaked at number 28 on the Hong Kong MOOV Top 100 Singles Chart ending February 1, 2015. Promotions of the single was minimal as Liew was in the United States and did not return to Hong Kong for the release of both the series and the song. Universal Music Hong Kong promoted the single on its Facebook page and on its YouTube channel.

== Music video ==
Hong Kong Television Network released a one-minute thirty seconds teaser music video of the song on December 10, 2014 consisting of clips from To Be or Not to Be. A full music video (which also consists solely of clips from the series, produced by Hong Kong Television Network) was released on Universal Music Hong Kong's YouTube channel on January 22, 2015.

== Track listing ==
Digital download

1. "兩杯茶 (Two Cups of Tea)" - 4:17

== Charts ==
Chart (2015)	Peak position
Hong Kong (MOOV Top 100)	28
