= Not a Little Girl Anymore =

Not a Little Girl Anymore may refer to:

- Not a Little Girl Anymore (Prudence Liew album), 1992
- Not a Little Girl Anymore (Linda Lewis album), 1975
