= Love Addict (album) =

Studio album by Prudence Liew
- Released: June 17, 2011
- Recorded: 2010–2011
- Genre: Mandopop, jazz, cover album, audiophile
- Label: Cinepoly
- Producer: Prudence Liew

Prudence Liew chronology
The Queen of Hardships (2009)	Love Addict (2011)	偷 Stolen Moments (2012)

Singles from Love Addict
- 1. "認錯 (Apologize)" Released: April 1, 2011; 2. "走鋼索的人 (A Tightrope Walker)" Released: June 11, 2011

Love Addict is the 14th studio album and second mandopop album by Hong Kong singer Prudence Liew. This album marks the first Mandarin language studio album release from Liew since 愛自己 Love Yourself was released in Taiwan in 2000. This album is a cover album that consists entirely of songs that were originally sung by male singers. This is the first in a series of three cover albums released by Liew in three different languages: the Cantonese album 偷 Stolen Moments which came after in July 2012, and an English album titled Reincarnated Love which was released in July 2017.

== Album information ==
The recording of this album was mixed in 24-bit with a sampling rate of 96 kHz. It was then mastered in the United States and the discs were compressed and made in Germany in Super Audio CD format. Liew has stated that this is a true album for audiophiles.

Photography for this album was done by Hong Kong actor Chapman To, who is a photography enthusiast and a longtime fan of Liew. To admitted that this was the first time he had been hired as a paid professional photographer.

== Release ==
The album was released on June 17, 2011, in Hong Kong. HMV Hong Kong promoted the album with an offer of tickets to Liew's mini-concert with pre-orders of the album.

Upon its release, the album charted at number 2 in the HMV Hong Kong's Overall Sales Chart behind Lady Gaga's album Born This Way and topped both the Asian Sales Chart and Cantonese/Mandarin Sales Chart for two consecutive weeks.

== Track listing ==
1. 認錯 (Apologize) originally sung by 優客李林 Ukulele in 1991
2. 他一定很愛你 (He Must Really Love You) originally sung by 阿杜 A-do in 2002
3. 你把我灌醉 (You Made Me Drunk) originally sung by 黃大煒 David Wong in 1994
4. 原來的我 (The Original Me) originally sung by 齊秦 Chyi Chin in 1988
5. 一場遊戲一場夢 (A Game, A Dream) originally sung by 王傑 Dave Wang in 1989
6. 走鋼索的人 (A Tightrope Walker) originally sung by 李泉 James Li in 1999
7. 愛如潮水 (Love Like Tides) originally sung by 張信哲 Jeff Chang in 1993
8. 老實情歌 (Honest Love Song) originally sung by 庾澄慶 Harlem Yu in 1993
9. 其實你不懂我的心 (Actually, You Do Not Understand My Heart) originally sung by 童安格 Angus Tung in 1988
10. 何去何從 (Where to Come and Go) originally sung by 張國榮 Leslie Cheung in 1995

== Chart history ==
=== Album ===
Chart	Peak position
HMV Hong Kong Overall Sales Chart	2
HMV Hong Kong Asian Sales Chart	1
HMV Hong Kong Cantonese/Mandarin Sales Chart	1

=== Singles (radio airplay) ===
Song title	Release date	903	RTHK	997
認錯 (Apologize)	04/01/2011	18	12	5
走鋼索的人 (A Tightrope Walker)	06/11/2011	-	-	4
"—" denotes releases that did not chart or were not released to that station.

== Release history ==
Region	Date	Label
Hong Kong	June 17, 2011	Cinepoly Records
Taiwan	June 21, 2011	Universal Music Taiwan
China	November 27, 2011	Universal Music China
