= 1987 RTHK Top 10 Gold Songs Awards =

Hong Kong music awards ceremony

The 1987 RTHK Top 10 Gold Songs Awards (Chinese: 1987年度十大中文金曲得獎) was held in 1987 for the 1986 music season.

== Top 10 song awards ==
The top 10 songs (十大中文金曲) of 1987 are as follows.

Song name in Chinese	Artist	Composer	Lyricist
太陽星辰	Jacky Cheung	Hideaki Tokunaga (德永英明)	Richard Lam
灰色	Sandy Lam	Tambi Fernando Iris Fernando Wayne Brown	Richard Lam
千億個夜晚	George Lam	Forster Keans Jackson	Pun wai-yun (潘偉源)
Don't Say Goodbye	Alan Tam	鈴木 大津	Wong zan (黃真)
我的故事	Danny Chan	Danny Chan	Heung Suet-wai (向雪懷)
誠懇	Kenny Bee	Lam man-yi (林敏怡) Kenny Bee	Andrew Lam (林敏驄)
無心睡眠	Leslie Cheung	Alvin Kwok (郭小霖)	Andrew Lam (林敏驄)
傾心	Raidas	Wong Yiu-kong (黃耀光)	Yoek yu (若愚)
知心當玩偶	Alan Tam	Alan Tam	Keith Chan (陳少琪)
烈燄紅唇	Anita Mui	Anthony Lun	Pun wai-yun (潘偉源)

== Other awards ==
Award	Song or album (if available)	Recipient
Sales award (全年銷量冠軍大獎)	Summer Romance	Leslie Cheung
Best record producer award (最佳唱片監製獎)	Prudence Liew	Chan Wing-loeng (陳永良) for Prudence Liew
Best musical arrangements (最佳編曲獎)	我的故事	CC To (杜自持)
Best record design award (最佳唱片封套設計獎)	鮑皓昕	Taiji (太極)
IFBI award (IFBI 大獎)	–	Alan Tam
RTHK Golden needle award (金針獎)	–	Chan Dip-yi (陳蝶衣)
