= Opening the Sexual Boundaries Concert CD =

Opening the Sexual Boundaries Concert CD 大開色界演唱會

Live album by Prudence Liew
- Released: May 29, 2008
- Recorded: April 19–20, 2008; Hong Kong Coliseum
- Genre: Cantopop
- Label: Cinepoly
- Producer: Prudence Liew; Jerald Chan

Prudence Liew chronology
大開色界新曲+精選 (Opening the Sexual Boundaries) (2008)	Opening the Sexual Boundaries Concert CD 大開色界演唱會 (2008)	The Queen of Hardships (2009)

Singles from Opening the Sexual Boundaries Concert CD
- 1. "最後一夜 The Last Night [Studio Ballad Version]" Released: May 22, 2008

大開色界演唱會 Opening the Sexual Boundaries Concert CD is a live concert album by cantopop singer Prudence Liew, released on May 29, 2008.

== Concert details ==
This recording was made during the concert series of the same name held at the Hong Kong Coliseum on April 19, & April 20, 2008. The concerts marked the first time Liew had a solo concert series at the venue and also her first official concert since she went on hiatus back in 1995.

== Release & formats ==
Along with the live recordings during the concert, Liew recorded a special track as a thank you to her fans. The track is her signature song, "最後一夜 The Last Night", but instead of the original dance track, it was recorded as a ballad with solely a piano accompaniment. The ballad version was originally sparked as an impromptu encore during the end of the concert on April 20 when Liew announced she had no more songs prepared, but opted to reprise one of her songs. Both the live and the studio versions of the ballad are available in this 2-CD set. The studio ballad version was also released as a radio airplay single to promote the concert album.

Two months after the CD release of the concert, Cinepoly Records released the DVD version of the concert as a 3 DVD set. The DVD release contained mostly the same tracklist as the CD version, with the noticeable exclusion of Jan Lamb's performance due to his contract with another record company. Additions include the music videos for four new songs as bonus tracks. The DVD version also contains karaoke functions with optional karaoke-style subtitles and vocal reduction (as with most concert DVD releases in Hong Kong).

== Track listings ==
=== CD release ===
==== Disc 1 ====
From Yesasia.

1. Dance Medley: 亞熱帶少年, "Mind Made Up", 點解, 嬉戲號客機 ("Subtropical Boy", "Mind Made Up", "Why?", "Flight Playtime")
2. 清晨 ("Clear Morning")
3. 隔 ("Separated")
4. "Man In The Moon"
5. 蠢動 ("Urging the Move")
6. 赤裸抱月下 ("A Nude Embrace Under the Moon")
7. "Give Me All Your Love, Boy"
8. 霓虹鳥 ("Neon Bird")
9. Medley: 各自各精彩, 公子多情, 娃娃歲月, 一對舊皮鞋, 愛是無涯 ("Each Shining Their Own Way", "Loving Prince", "The Ages of Little Girl", "A Pair of Old Loafers", "Love Has No Boundaries")
10. 富士山下 ("Under Mount Fuji" – cover of Eason Chan song)
11. 我估不到 ("I Could Not Have Guessed")

==== Disc 2 ====
1. 點解 ("Why?"; duet with Jan Lamb)
2. Dance Medley: 大開色界, 小驚大怪, 破例, 玩玩 ("Opening the Sexual Boundaries", "Overdramatic Scare", "Breaking the Rules", "Play Play")
3. "So Sad" (duet with Grasshopper)
4. 依依 ("Lingering")
5. 你說是甜我說苦 ("Your Words Are Sweet, Mine Are Bitter")
6. 偷窺 ("Peeking"; duet with William So)
7. 這雙眼只望你 ("Can't Take My Eyes Off You")
8. 夜已變得騷了 ("The Night Has Become Horny")
9. 事後 ("Afterwards")
10. 最後一夜 ("The Last Night")
11. 浮花 ("The Floating Flower")
12. 午夜情 ("Midnight Love")
13. 一見鍾情 ("Love at First Sight")
14. 最後一夜 ("The Last Night"; ballad version)
15. 最後一夜 ("The Last Night"; studio ballad version; bonus track)

=== DVD release ===
Opening the Sexual Boundaries Concert DVD 大開色界演唱會DVD

Video by Prudence Liew
- Released: July 23, 2008
- Recorded: April 19–20, 2008; Hong Kong Coliseum
- Genre: Cantopop
- Label: Cinepoly
- Producer: Prudence Liew; Jerald Chan

==== Disc 1 ====
From Yesasia.

1. 亞熱帶少年 "Subtropical Boy"
2. "Mind Made Up"
3. 點解 ("Why?")
4. 嬉戲號客機 ("Flight Playtime")
5. 清晨 ("Clear Morning")
6. 隔 ("Separated")
7. "Man In The Moon"
8. 蠢動 ("Urging to Move")
9. 赤裸抱月下 ("A Nude Embrace Under the Moon")
10. "Give Me All Your Love, Boy"
11. 霓虹鳥 ("Neon Bird")
12. 各自各精彩 ("Each Shining Their Own Way")
13. 公子多情 ("Loving Prince")
14. 娃娃歲月 ("The Ages of Little Girl")
15. 一對舊皮鞋 ("A Pair of Old Loafers")
16. 愛是無涯 ("Love Has No Boundaries")

==== Disc 2 ====
1. 富士山下 ("Under Mount Fuji" – cover of Eason Chan song)
2. 我估不到 ("I Could Not Have Guessed")
3. 小驚大怪 ("Overdramatic Scare")
4. 破例 ("Breaking the Rules")
5. 玩玩 ("Play Play")
6. "So Sad" (duet with Grasshopper)
7. 依依 ("Lingering")
8. 你說是甜我說苦 ("Your Words Are Sweet, Mine Are Bitter")
9. 偷窺 ("Peeking"; duet with William So)
10. 這雙眼只望你 ("Can't Take My Eyes Off You")
11. 夜已變得騷了 ("The Night Has Become Horny"; with guest Tony Leung Ka-Fai)

==== Disc 3 ====
1. 夜已變得騷了 ("The Night Has Become Horny"; with guest John Shum)
2. 事後 ("Afterwards")
3. 最後一夜 ("The Last Night")
4. 浮花 ("The Floating Flower")
5. 午夜情 ("Midnight Love")
6. 一見鍾情 ("Love at First Sight")
7. 最後一夜 ("The Last Night"; ballad version)
8. 最後一夜 ("The Last Night"; studio ballad version; bonus music video)
9. 大開色界 ("Opening the Sexual Boundaries"; featuring Jan Lamb; bonus music video)
10. 浮花 ("The Floating Flower"; bonus music video)
11. 私人補習 ("Private Tutor"; bonus music video)
12. "Making of Opening the Sexual Boundaries Concert" (documentary)

== Chart history ==
=== CD version ===
Chart Name	Peak Position
HMV Hong Kong Cantonese/Mandarin Sales Chart	11

=== DVD version ===
Chart Name	Peak Position
HMV Asian DVD Sales Chart	7
