= William So discography =

- Studio albums: 21
- Live albums: 4
- Compilation albums: 7

This is the discography of Cantopop artist William So.

== Singles ==
Year	Album title	Release date	Language	Label
2000	So's Time (蘇情時間)	June 1, 2000	Mandarin	

== Studio albums ==
Year	Album title	Release date	Language	Label
1989	Insomia (失眠)	September 1989	Cantonese	
1991	Do Not Leave Me (不要離開我)	January 1991	Cantonese	
1993	Color of Life (生命色彩)	June 1993	Cantonese	
1994	Oh Gal	March 1994	Cantonese	
1995	The Passion of Love (最深刻的愛)	March 22, 1995	Cantonese	Cinepoly
1995	If One Day I Forget (假使有日能忘記)	December 22, 1995	Cantonese	Cinepoly
1996	Never Too Late To Love (愛上一個人永遠不會太遲)	May 20, 1996	Cantonese	Cinepoly
1996	Red Fashion (紅式)	September 1, 1996	Cantonese	Cinepoly
1997	Love Is A Push In The Right Direction (情來自有康)	January 1, 1997	Cantonese	Go East
1997	Good Music (蘇永康好音樂宣言)		Cantonese	Go East
1997	Love Like Violent Radicalism and Blind Person (愛似狂潮盲人)	March 1, 1997	Mandarin	Go East
1997	Speech Of Independence(獨立宣言)	November 11, 1997	Cantonese	Go East
1998	Book of Relief (解脫書)	January 12, 1999	Mandarin	Go East
1998	Nice So Nice(舊愛還是最美)	October 1, 1998	Mandarin	Go East
1998	Never Feel Happy Alone (不想獨自快樂)	September 1, 1998	Cantonese	Go East
1999	Too Nice	February 1, 1999	Mandarin	Go East
1999	To Love Someone Is Hard(愛一個人好難)	June 1, 1999	Mandarin	Go East
1999	So Wing Hong Dressing Room (蘇永康的化妝間)	October 12, 1999	Cantonese, Mandarin	Go East
2000	Because Love You (因為愛你)	March 17, 2000	Cantonese	Go East
2000	So's Time (蘇情時間)	May 1, 2000	Mandarin	Go East
2001	Infinite Undecesiveness (意猶未盡)	February 16, 2001	Cantonese	Go East
2001	Sadness Not Permitted (悲傷止步)	October 19, 2001	Mandarin	Go East
2002	William So's Love Songs (康定情歌)	April 6, 2002	Cantonese	Go East
2003	So Fresh	July 9, 2003	Mandarin	Go East
2008	Embrace (擁抱)	June 14, 2008	Mandarin	Gold Label
2008	So I Say	November 14, 2008	Cantonese	Gold Label

== Compilation albums ==
Year	Album title	Release date	Language	Label
1994	Mini So	September 27, 1994	Cantonese	Cinepoly
1998	The Best of William So(蘇永康宣言精選)	May 1, 1998	Cantonese, Mandarin	Go East
2001	William So Best Selection + Music Box (蘇永康好精選+Music Box)	October 16, 2001	Cantonese	Go East
2003	Super Nice	June 13, 2002	Mandarin	Go East
2003	Laughing (笑下去)	April 28, 2003	Cantonese	Go East
2003	The Selection of William So(蘇永康好精選)	January 22, 2003	Cantonese	Go East
2004	Cheap Love Song(廉價情歌)	September 22, 2004	Cantonese, Mandarin	Go East
2006	Love Music - So Wing Hong(愛音樂三人行)	June 27, 2006	Cantonese	Go East

== Live albums ==
Year	Album title	Release date	Language	Label
1997	So's First Exciting Live (SO精彩第一次LIVE)		Cantonese, Mandarin	Go East
1999	William So's Concert (越唱越開心演唱會)	April 1, 1999	Cantonese	Go East
2002	William So Live In Concert (蘇永康定情歌演唱會)	August 1, 2002	Cantonese	Go East
2003	Andy Hui & William So Live With The Hong Kong Sinfonietta (安康演唱會)	October 30, 2003	Cantonese, Mandarin	Go East
