= Hit Mix (album) =

Remix album by Prudence Liew
- Released: May 21 1988
- Recorded: 1987–1998
- Genre: Cantopop, dance
- Length: 30:42
- Label: Current
- Producer: Joseph Chan

Prudence Liew chronology
點解 Why (1987)	Hit Mix (1988)	公子多情 Loving Prince (1988)

Hit Mix is a remix compilation album of cantopop singer Prudence Liew, released in May 1988. Although billed as a remix album, it only contains three remixes of songs from her previous album, Why. The other songs on this album are two previously unreleased tracks as well as a cover version of What Have I Done to Deserve This? by Pet Shop Boys, a song which Liew has recorded a Cantonese version of. It was the title track of her last album, Why.

== Track listing ==
No.	Title	Lyrics	Music	Length
1.	"Give Me All Your Love, Boy" (Remixed Version)	Richard Lam	Richard Yung	7:10
2.	"風情 (Wind Love)"	Anonymous	Joseph Chan	4:46
3.	"What Have I Done to Deserve This?"	Neil Tennant, Chris Lowe, Allee Willis	Neil Tennant, Chris Lowe, Allee Willis	4:00
4.	"這雙眼只望你 (Can't Take My Eyes Off You)" (Remixed Version)	Richard Lam	Bob Crewe, Bob Gaudio	7:15
5.	"點解 (Why?)" (Remixed Version)	Albert Leung	Neil Tennant, Chris Lowe, Allee Willis	4:33
6.	"生活是怎樣的歌 (What Kind of Song is Life?)"	Wong Jim	Wong Jim	2:58
Total length:				30:42
