= Lee Shing Chak =

Fung Shui practitioner

- Chinese: 李丞責
- Born: Lee Siu Tong Chinese: 李紹唐; October 26, 1968 (age 56); Hong Kong
- Other names: Shing Tong Lee
- Occupation: Fung Shui specialist
- Spouse(s): Tam Pui Lai (m.2007, dic 2011), Sandy Lau
- Children: 1

Lee Shing Chak (李丞責, born 1968 in Hong Kong) is a Fung Shui practitioner from Hong Kong.

== Early life ==
In 1968, Lee was born as Lee Siu Tong. At 16 years old, Lee's father changed his name from Lee Siu Tong (李紹唐) to Lee Shing Chak (李丞責). Three generations from his family are involved in geomancy.

== Career ==
Starting from seven or eight years old, he learned Fung Shui from his father, and finally become a Fung Shui specialist when he was 19 years old. He combines the ancient art of feng shui with the modern practice of statistics to divine what the future holds.

== Personal life ==
On February 4, 2007, Lee married Tam Pui Lai after 13 years of relationship. Many celebrities are invited to attend the wedding ceremony. However, in April 2011, Lee divorced Tam Pui Lai. In the same year, he and artist Sandy Lau fell in love when shooting TV program "Hong Kong Mystery Case". On January 24, 2012, Sandy Lau's birthday, he proposed successfully and they are engaged. Their daughter was born on March 19, 2016.

=== Books ===
Year	Book Title
2016	Master Lee Shing Chak (Li cheng ze) 2017 Year of the Rooster Zodiac Fortune (Chinese Edition, NO English) 李丞责─鷄缘巧合二0一七
2015	談笑豐猴：生肖運程2016(2本+筆+守護卡)
2014	《欽天監萬年曆》
2014	《喜氣洋羊二○一五（附送《羊羊自得行運秘笈》）》
2013	《馬上行運 ~ 李丞責博士 2014生肖運程（附《馬年行運秘笈》）》
2012	《蛇來運到－－李丞責博士2013生肖運程》
2011	《諸龍入水 二○一二(附龍年行運秘笈)》
2010	《李丞責博士 兔氣揚眉二○一一（隨書附送《兔年行運秘笈》）》
2010	《實用拜神祭祖禮俗手冊》
2009	《李丞責虎虎生威 2010》

== Filmography ==
=== Radio Program ===
- 新城電台：
  - 靈舍八卦
- 香港電台：
  - 瘋show快活人

=== TV Program ===
- 有線電視：
  - 玄機解碼
  - 怪談
- 無綫電視：
  - 香港玄案
  - 新春開運王
  - 我愛香港

=== Film ===
- 香港第一凶宅
- 豪情 飾 Mike
- 行運秘笈
