= The Queen of Hardships =

Studio album by Prudence Liew
- Released: October 22, 2009 (1st edition); December 31, 2009 (2nd edition)
- Recorded: 2009
- Genre: Cantopop
- Label: Cinepoly
- Producer: Prudence Liew

Prudence Liew chronology
大開色界演唱會CD (Opening the Sexual Boundaries Concert CD) (2008)	The Queen of Hardships (2009)	Love Addict (2011)

Singles from The Queen of Hardships
- 1. "蝙蝠 (Bat)" Released: August 22, 2009; 2. "雪泥 (Slush)" Released: October 11, 2009

The Queen of Hardships (sometimes credited as Queen of Hardships) is the 13th studio album by cantopop singer Prudence Liew. This album marks the first Cantonese language studio album release from Liew in 15 years since her 1994 release of 夜有所思，日有所夢 Thoughts in the Night, Dreams During the Day and the first studio album release in 9 years. Her previous studio album was the mandopop album, 愛自己 Love Yourself released in Taiwan in 2000.

== Release ==
=== Album ===
The album was released on October 22, 2009, in Hong Kong. Universal Music Hong Kong promoted the album with an offer of tickets to Liew's mini-concert with pre-orders of the album. The album also comes with a bonus DVD with three music videos.

Upon its release, the album topped the Asian Sales Chart at HMV, the largest record retailer in Hong Kong. It also peaked at number three in the HMV Overall Sales Chart, behind Madonna's compilation album Celebration and Michael Bublé's Crazy Love.

Due to the commercial success of the album, Universal Music announced the issue of a second edition of the album with an additional bonus DVD of Liew's 劉美君蝙蝠之夜音樂會 (The Night of Bats Mini-Concert) held on October 31, 2009. The second edition triple album was released on December 31, 2009.

=== Singles ===
The lead single, 蝙蝠 (Bat), was released to radio stations on August 22, 2009. It has since reached number 1 on the RTHK Top 20 chart and number 2 on Metro Showbiz's Top 20 countdown chart. On October 13, 2009, the official music video debut was featured on Universal Music Hong Kong's channel for YouTube.

The second single released to radio was 雪泥 (Slush) on October 11, 2009. Since then it has hit the top 10 in the countdown charts of all three major radio stations in Hong Kong.

== Track listing ==
=== 1st edition ===
CD

1. 雪泥 (Slush)
2. 洋蔥 (Onion)
3. 也好 (Better Off)
4. 寧願怎樣 (Matter of Choice)
5. 蝙蝠 (Bat)
6. 一代艷星 (Legendary Sexy Star)
7. 我喝香水大 (I Grew Up Drinking Perfume)
8. Baby You're The One
9. Mr. A. Ho
10. 色香味 (Sensations of Love)

Bonus DVD

1. 雪泥 (Slush) Music Video
2. 蝙蝠 (Bat) Music Video
3. Baby You're The One Music Video

=== 2nd edition ===
Includes the above CD and DVD plus the following DVD.
2nd Bonus DVD: The Night of Bats Mini-Concert 2009

1. 雪泥 (Slush)
2. 我喝香水大 (I Grew Up Drinking Perfume)
3. Mr. A. Ho
4. 大開眼戒 (Opening the Taboos of Vision) with Keeva Mak
5. Baby You're The One
6. 不可能說的夢 (The Dream That Cannot Be Spoken Of)
7. 事前 (Beforehand)
8. 自甘墮落 (Self-Deserving Demise)
9. 浮花 (The Floating Flower)
10. 也好 (Better Off)
11. 寧願怎樣 (Matter of Choice)
12. 大開色界 (Opening the Sexual Boundaries)
13. 蝙蝠 (Bat)

== Chart positions ==
=== Album ===
Chart	Peak position
HMV Hong Kong Overall Sales Chart	3
HMV Hong Kong Asian Sales Chart	1

=== Singles (Radio airplay) ===
Song title	Release date	903	RTHK	997
蝙蝠 (Bat)	08/22/2009	10	1	2
雪泥 (Slush)	10/11/2009	2	6	2
"—" denotes releases that did not chart or were not released to that station.
