= Listen to Me =

Listen to Me may refer to:

- Listen to Me (film), 1989 American drama film
- Listen to Me (album), 1991 album by Prudence Liew
- "Listen to Me" (The Hollies song), 1968 song by The Hollies
- "Listen to Me", 1957 song by Buddy Holly, B-side to "I'm Gonna Love You Too"
- "Listen to Me", 1980/1981 song by Lake from Ouch!
- Listen to Me, 2016 novel by Hannah Pittard
- Listen to Me, 2022 novel by Tess Gerritsen
- "Listen to Me" (Doctors), a 2004 television episode
- "Listen to Me" (Shoestring), a 1979 television episode

== See also ==
- Listen to Me: Buddy Holly, 2011 tribute album
