= Prudence Liew (album) =

Prudence Liew 劉美君

Studio album by Prudence Liew
- Released: December 23, 1986
- Recorded: 1986
- Genre: Cantopop
- Label: Current; Sony BMG (reissues 2005-2008); Sony Music (reissues 2008-)
- Producer: Joseph Chan

Prudence Liew chronology
Prudence Liew 劉美君 (1986)	點解 Why (1987)

Singles from Prudence Liew
- 1. "午夜情 Midnight Love"; 2. "最後一夜 The Last Night"; 3. "霓虹鳥 Neon Bird"; 4. "亞熱帶少年 Subtropical Boy"; 5. "Mind Made Up"

Lau Mei Gwan (Chinese 劉美君 Prudence Liew) is the self-titled debut album of cantopop singer Prudence Liew, released on December 23, 1986.

== Album information ==
While working as a film producer, Liew was faced with the task of coming up with a theme song to the movie Midnight Beauties (午夜麗人). The film company eventually decided to cover a Korean pop ballad called "Dear J" by Lee Sun-hee and have Liew write the Cantonese lyrics as well as perform the vocals on the track. The result was the lead single to the album, titled "Midnight Love 午夜情", about a forbidden love between a hostess club worker and her client. The song garnered heavy airplay from radio stations across Hong Kong, and Liew was signed as the flagship artist to Current Records to record this album.

The second single off the album, "最後一夜 The Last Night", is a cover version of the song, "You're a Woman" by the German Europop group Bad Boys Blue. The track featured a heavy dance beat that proved to be very popular with the Hong Kong disco scene. The popularity of this song propelled Liew's status in the music scene and this song is still considered to be her signature song.

Many well-known composers and lyricists from Hong Kong and Taiwan contributed to this album, including Wong Jim (黃霑), Lam Manyee (林敏怡), Andrew Lam (林敏驄), and Richard Lam (林振強). Liew herself composed and wrote the lyrics for the final track of the album, "Troubled Depressing Night 惆悵滄桑夜" as well as providing the lyrics to the aforementioned "Midnight Love 午夜情".

== Reception ==
The album sold extremely well, having certified 10× platinum by the Hong Kong IFPI, selling over 500,000 copies. Sales of this album set the record in Hong Kong for the most albums sold by a debuting local artist, a record that has yet to be defeated. The album was also well received by critics, landing in many music critics' lists of top albums from the 1980s, and won two music awards as Album of the Year from RTHK Top 10 Gold Songs Awards and Jade Solid Gold Top 10 Awards in 1987.

== Re-issues ==
Because of the quality of the album, it is still very popular among audiophiles in Hong Kong today. Sony BMG (BMG Music which bought out Current Records in 1992), started re-issuing the album in several high-end-audio formats, including Super Audio CD, Extended Resolution Compact Disc and most recently, Blu-spec CD.

=== Re-issue formats ===
- Prudence Liew (SACD), released 2002
- Prudence Liew (Sony BMG – The Legendary Collection), released July 12, 2005
- Prudence Liew (XRCD), release September 28, 2005
- Prudence Liew (LPCD 45 Version), released July 24, 2007
- Prudence Liew (Pure Gold Series), released April 9, 2009
- Prudence Liew (Blu-Spec CD), release March 19, 2010

== Track listing ==
No.	Title	Lyrics	Music	Length
1.	"最後一夜 (The Last Night)"	Richard Lam	T. Hendrik, K. Van Harren, M. Applegate	5:32
2.	"清晨 (Early Morning)"	Man Cheng Yat	Lam Manyee	4:01
3.	"亞熱帶少年 Subtropical Boy"	Yu Yeen	Hon-Jen Gi	4:30
4.	"忘情 (Forgotten Love)"	Wong Jim	Wong Jim	3:59
5.	"午夜情 (Midnight Love)"	Prudence Liew	Se Geon Li	3:31
6.	"假裝 (Pretending)"	Hon-Leung Yip	Hon-Jen Gi	4:45
7.	"Mind Made Up"	Joey Ou	Richard Yung	4:14
8.	"霓虹鳥 (Neon Bird)"	Yuen Leung Poon	Joseph Chan	4:14
9.	"隔 (Separated)"	Andrew Lam	Andrew Lam	4:31
10.	"惆悵滄桑夜 (Troubled Depressing Night)"	Prudence Liew	Prudence Liew	4:05
Total length:				43:09

CD release (1987) bonus tracks
No.	Title	Lyrics	Music	Length
11.	"亞熱帶少年 Subtropical Boy" (Subtropical Mix)	Hon-Jen Gi, Yu Yeen	Hon-Jen Gi	8:30
12.	"Mind Made Up" (Extended Mix)	Joey Ou	Richard Yung	5:36
Total length:				57:15

SACD (2002) / XRCD (2005) Re-releases bonus tracks
No.	Title	Lyrics	Music	Length
11.	"公子多情 (Loving Prince)" (from Loving Prince, 1988)	Bo Sung Law, Prudence Liew	Anonymous	3:22
12.	"一對舊皮鞋 (A Pair of Old Loafers)" (from Why, 1987)	Yuen Leung Poon	Joseph Chan	4:49
13.	"異鄉邂逅 (Encounter in a Foreign Land)" (from Jokingly Saying, 1989)	Thomas Chow	Kwong Wing Chan	3:48
14.	"我估不到 (I Could Not Have Guessed)" (from The Naked Feeling, 1990)	Thomas Chow	Dirk Schoufs, Danielle Schoovaarts	4:24
15.	"愛是無涯 (Love Has No Boundaries)" (from Jokingly Saying, 1989)	Ching Chuen Tong	Rodney Trott, Jonathan Sweet	5:16
16.	"你說是甜我說苦 (Your Words Are Sweet, Mine Are Bitter)" (from Jokingly Saying, 1989)	Yuen Leung Poon	Richard Leigh	3:25
17.	"有誰知我此時情 (Who Would Know My Feelings Now)" (from The Naked Feeling, 1990)	Shengqiong Nie	Wong Jim	3:58
Total length:				1:12:11
