= To Be or Not to Be (TV series) =

- Written by: Alex Pao
- Directed by: Luk Tin-wah
- Starring: Maggie Cheung Ho-yee; Prudence Liew; Poon Chan-leung; Zac Kao; Savio Tsang; Queena Chan
- Opening theme: "Two Cups of Tea" by Prudence Liew
- Country of origin: Hong Kong
- Original language: Cantonese
- No. of episodes: 25

Production
- Production locations: Hong Kong; China
- Camera setup: Multi-camera
- Running time: 39–74 minutes
- Production company: Hong Kong Television Network

Original release
- Release: December 12, 2014 – January 15, 2015

To Be or Not to Be (Chinese: 來生不做香港人), formerly titled Hakka Women (Chinese: 客家女人, and released overseas under that name) is a 2014 television series produced by Hong Kong Television Network. The first episode premiered on December 12, 2014.

== Cast ==
- Maggie Cheung Ho-yee as Anson, Leung Mei-hang
  - Hill's ex-girlfriend, Cheung Tai-loi's girlfriend
- Prudence Liew as Leung Mei-tin
  - Cheung Kwok-cheung's wife, Tam Jeun-fai's girlfriend
- Poon Chan-leung as Hill, Au-yeung Shan
  - Anson's ex-boyfriend, Isabella's boyfriend
- Zac Kao as Cheung Tai-loi
- Savio Tsang as Cheung Kwok-cheung
- Queena Chan as Isabella, Zhang Dan-feng
- Lam Lei as Tam Jeun-fai
- May Tse as Ma Yau-kam
- Oscar Chan as Jacky Pang
- Janice Ting as Lana Hui
- Emily Wong as Lennon Ching
- Mimi Kung as Siu Suk-wai
- Wilson Tsui as Leung Chun-kong
- Alice Fung So-bor as Cheung Kwok-cheung's mother
- Cheng Shu-fung as Cheung Kwok-cheung's father
- Ng Wai-shan as Siu Lai
- Amy Tsang as Susan Chan
- Nadia Lun as Pancy
- Carlos Koo as Roy
- Jan Tse as Cindy
- Danel Yu as Fiona
- Simon Lo as Kin
- Leung Kin-ping as Ken
- Vivi Lee as Lam Siu-bing
- Dexter Young as Anson's lawyer, episode 22 to 25
- Candy Chu as kitchen staff, episode 25
