= The Earth Chorus =

The Earth Chorus is a song sung by many singers in 1987 celebrating the 20th anniversary of TVB who dominated the TV music market in Hong Kong, and raised funds for The Community Chest of Hong Kong. It was published in Gramophone record and cassette tape. It won TVB's 1987 Jade Solid Gold Best Ten Music Awards Presentation.
