= Swing (Hong Kong band) =

Hong Kong musical duo

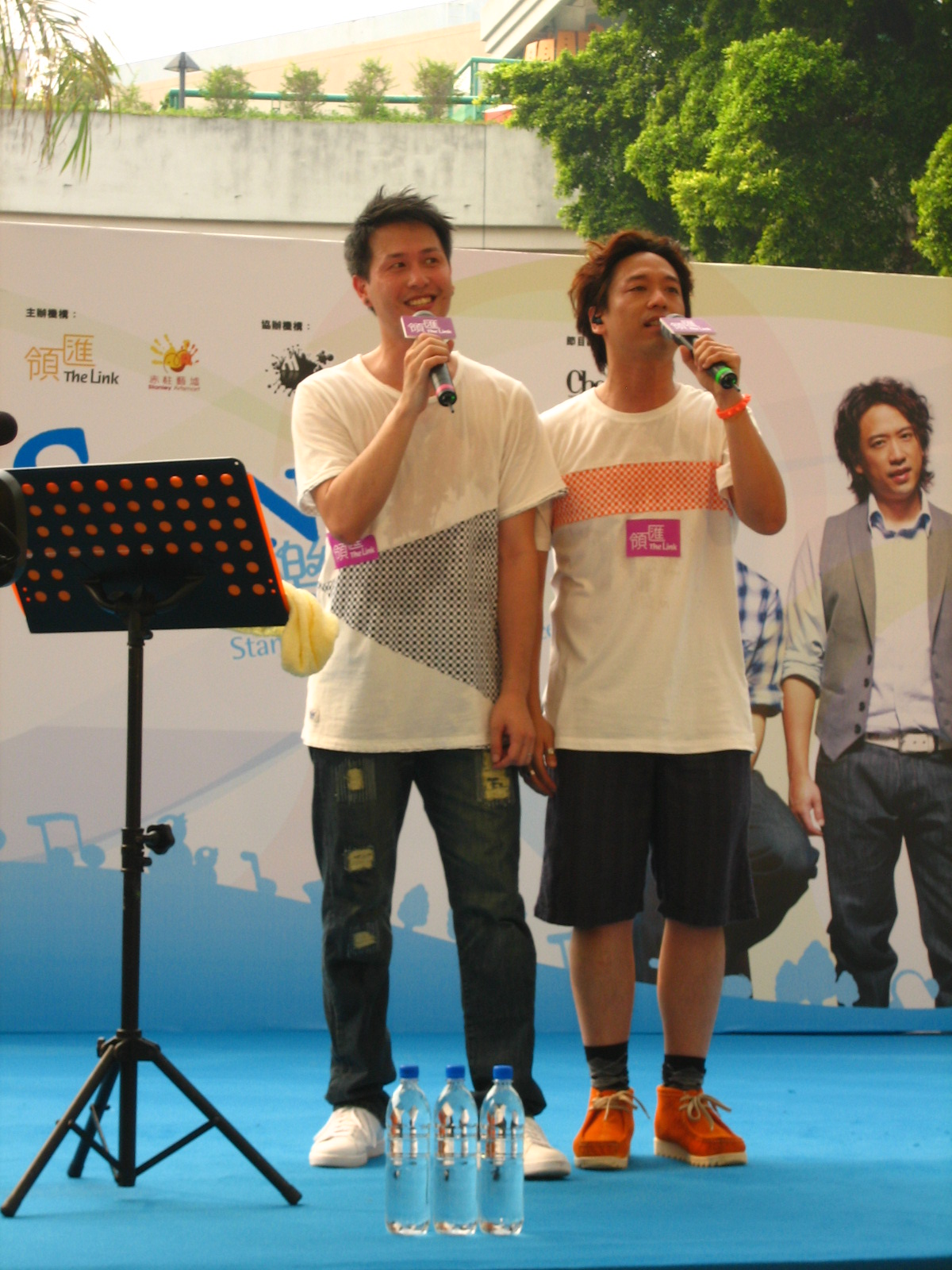
- (From the left) Jerald Chan and Eric Kwok.
- Born: Hong Kong
- Occupations: Singer-songwriters, musicians
- Musical career
- Origin: Hong Kong
- Genres: Cantopop
- Label: Cinepoly
- Members: Eric Kwok, Jerald Chan

Swing is a Hong Kong musical duo that was founded in 1999. The members are Eric Kwok and Jerald Chan. The group was formerly known as "Snowman". Their best known work is "1984" and "A ticket in half" (半張飛).

Swing was disbanded in 2002, but returned in 2009 for the release of the Wu Dang album. Another album Electro was released in 2010 .

== Career ==
In 1997, Chan met Kwok for the first time when the former returned to Hong Kong after graduating from university.

In 1999, they formed Snowman under the label EEI, which was owned by EMI. In the same year they released the first album, Snowman. The songs were composed and arranged by Snowman, with vocal production by Chung Ting Yat, Danny. Meanwhile, they made songs for singers such as Gigi Leung Wing-Kei.

EEI closed in 2000. During the period when the group was searching for another record company, Kwok continued composing songs for singers such as Eason Chan, Jacky Cheung and Cass Phang. Notable works made during this period include The Lucky Ferris Wheel (幸福摩天輪) and To The Boys I Loved (給我愛過的男孩們). In the same year, Snowman joined EEG as the company was searching for composers to produce songs for Lillian Ho Ka-Lei. In the same year, they transferred to EEG's subsidiary Music Plus and changed their name to "Swing".

During the years in EEG, they released four albums: Swing, On Fire and For Sale and Swing Swang Swung.

In Commercial Radio Hong Kong Ultimate Song Chart Awards of 2001, Swing received the best group award.

Kwok and Chan also collaborated with radio DJs. They produced Yiu Wing Entertainment (耀榮娛樂) and Little Meteor (小流星) for a musical by Commercial Radio DJs Sammy Leung and Kitty Yuen. Also, they composed Sing Sung (惺忪) and Fate, Luck and Feng Shui (一命、二運、三風水) for two RTHK programmes.

In 2002, Swing was disbanded after releasing the "best-of" album Swing Swang Swung.

Between 2002 and 2009, Eric made songs for singers including Sally Yeh, Eason Chan and Hacken Lee. His 2008 work for Kay Tse, Wedding Card Street (囍帖街), swept local music awards.

At the same time, Chan mainly produced for artists of Silly Thing, such as Juno Mak and Yan Ng. He was also the co-producer to Prudence Liew's comeback compilation album, Opening the Sexual Boundaries (大開色界).

In 2009, Swing returned in Eason Chan's SAME WRONG SIN concert. They performed with Eason Chan and Mr.

In September 2009, Swing released their album Wu Dang (武當). They performed two concerts in Hong Kong International Trade and Exhibition Centre and Stanley Plaza for their own group. The album received three awards for album items in the year.

In August 2010, Swing launched EP Electro (電) and held the new CD release outside World Trade Center in Causeway Bay.

== Albums ==
- Snowman(23 November 1999, by Snowman)
- Swing(1 October 2000)
- On Fire(1 July 2001)
- For Sale(6 December 2001)
- Swing Swang Swung(8 March 2002)
- 武當(9 September 2009)
- 電(3 August 2010)
- Swing到盡(17 November 2011)
