= Fate (EP) =

Fate 緣

EP by Prudence Liew
- Released: 1989
- Recorded: 1988
- Genre: Cantopop
- Length: 18:14
- Label: Current
- Producer: Joseph Chan

Prudence Liew chronology
Loving Prince 公子多情 (October 1988)	Fate 緣 (1989)	Remixes (1989)

緣 Fate (sometimes credited as 緣 • 痴心誤會 Fate • Loving Misunderstanding) is an EP by cantopop singer Prudence Liew, released in 1989.

== Background information ==
As Liew was pregnant with her second child after the release of Loving Prince 公子多情, she was on maternity leave for much of 1989. To tie fans over until the release of her next album Jokingly Saying 笑說, Current Records decided to produce a remix album and this EP containing two songs that were themes from TVB series and TV movies. This is also Liew's last studio release on Current Records before it was bought out by BMG Music in 1989.

The first track was the title track "緣 Fate", which was the theme to the series, 萬家傳說 The Vixen's Tale starring Roger Kwok and Sheren Tang.

The second track is "痴心誤會 Loving Misunderstanding". It served as the ending theme to the TV movie, 奪命情人 The Killing Lover starring Liew, and a yet-to-be-famous Leon Lai. This song was previously released on her album, Loving Prince.

== Track listing ==
No.	Title	Lyrics	Music	Length
1.	"緣 (Fate)"	Yuen Leung Poon	Joseph Chan	4:47
2.	"痴心誤會 (Loving Misunderstanding)"	Siu May	Richard Yung	4:20
3.	"緣 (Fate)" (Instrumental Version)		Joseph Chan	4:47
4.	"痴心誤會 (Loving Misunderstanding)" (Instrumental Version)		Richard Yung	4:20
Total length:				18:14
