= Why (Prudence Liew album) =

Why 點解

Studio album by Prudence Liew
- Released: November 1987
- Recorded: August 1987
- Genre: Cantopop
- Length: 48:08
- Label: Current; Sony BMG (reissues 2005-2008); Sony (reissues 2008-)
- Producer: Josephu Chan

Prudence Liew chronology
劉美君 Prudence Liew (1986)	Why 點解 (1987)	Hit Mix (1988)

Singles from Prudence Liew
- 1. "Man in the Moon"; 2. "點解 Why"; 3. "一對舊皮鞋 A Pair of Old Loafers"; 4. "這雙眼只望你 Can't Take My Eyes Off You"; 5. "Give Me All Your Love Boy"

Dim Gaai (Cantonese 點解 Why) is the second studio album of cantopop singer Prudence Liew, released in November 1987.

== Background information ==
Upon the success of her debut album, the eponymous Prudence Liew, her label, Current Records, followed-up with this album in the winter of 1987. The album followed a different route of the debut album, where most of the songs were composed by local or Chinese songwriters. This album featured many covers of European and American songs, including the title track. Three of the cover songs were released as singles. These covers were often treated with a strong dance beat reminiscent of her signature song from the previous album, "The Last Night".

=== Covers ===
- Track 2: "Man in the Moon" is a cover of "Man in the Moon" by German singer Lady Lily (also known as Erika Bruhn from the 1970s German pop duo de:Gitti und Erika) in 1986.
- Track 3: "這雙眼只望你" is a cover of "Can't Take My Eyes Off You" by Frankie Valli in 1967.
- Track 8: "失戀Cafe" is a cover of "In The Night" by Spanish dance act Daydream
- Track 9: "點解" is a cover of "What Have I Done to Deserve This? by Pet Shop Boys featuring Dusty Springfield in 1987.

== Reception and reissues ==
Because Prudence Liew fared so well with critics, having won several Best Album of the Year awards, this follow-up album was often compared to it. Critics often thought this album to be of lesser quality when compared to the debut album as this album is too "westernized" and contained too many covers. Although this album failed to achieve the critical acclaim of her previous album, it still sold fairly well in Hong Kong and was certified platinum by the Hong Kong IFPI in early 1988.

Due to the long-term success of the album, Sony BMG (and later Sony Music) have re-issued the album several times as part of their "The Legendary Collection" in 2005 and "Pure Gold Series" in 2009

== Track listings ==
No.	Title	Lyrics	Music	Length
1.	"一對舊皮鞋 (A Pair of Old Loafers)"	Yuen Leung Poon	Joseph Chan	4:47
2.	"Man in the Moon"	Chan Siu Kei	Christian Bruhn, Erica Bruhn, D. Votion	3:30
3.	"這雙眼只望你 (Can't Take My Eyes Off You)"	Richard Lam	Bob Crewe, Bob Gaudio	5:18
4.	"為你而生 (Living For You)"	Tung Lo	Tung Lo	5:04
5.	"生活一小時 (Living For One Hour)"	Jolland Chan	Kenji Sawada	5:24
6.	"Give Me All Your Love, Boy"	Richard Lam	Richard Yung	5:37
7.	"請求 (Please)"	David Yiu	David Yiu	4:32
8.	"失戀Cafe (Heartbreak Cafe)"	Albert Leung	I.C. Suarez	4:17
9.	"點解 (Why?)"	Albert Leung	Neil Tennant, Chris Lowe, Allee Willis	4:19
10.	"自甘墮落 (Self-Deserved Demise)"	Henry Lai	Anonymous	5:20
Total length:				48:08
