= Hong Kong Love =

1991 compilation albums by Prudence Liew

Hong Kong Love 香港情

Greatest hits album by Prudence Liew
- Released: 1991
- Recorded: 1986–1990
- Genre: Cantopop
- Label: BMG Pacific

Prudence Liew chronology
Love & Passion 2 (1991)	Hong Kong Love 香港情 (1991)	香港情未了 Hong Kong Love Continued (1991)

Hong Kong Love Continued 香港情未了

Greatest hits album by Prudence Liew
- Released: 1991
- Recorded: 1986-1990
- Genre: Cantopop
- Label: BMG Pacific

Prudence Liew chronology
香港情 Hong Kong Love (1991)	Hong Kong Love Continued 香港情未了 (1991)	不再娃娃 Not a Little Girl Anymore (1992)

Hong Kong Love is a series of two greatest hits compilation albums by cantopop singer Prudence Liew, both released in 1991.

== Album details ==
This compilation series originally only consisted of the first release, 香港情 Hong Kong Love. It was released by BMG Pacific after Liew's contract was over with them and she had signed to Columbia Records. BMG Pacific began releasing compilation albums of Liew's previous works to counteract and deter sales from her upcoming debut album from Columbia Records. BMG Pacific had previously released the Love & Passion compilation series of two albums prior to Hong Kong Love. As this would be the third Liew compilation album in less than a year, to entice listeners into buying this compilation, a previously unreleased song, "錯便錯到底 (If it is a Mistake, then Commit the Mistake Fully)" was added to this album.

However, upon the issue of Hong Kong Love, Columbia Records has yet to release an album for Liew. Thus, BMG Pacific released another compilation as a continuation of the series entitled 香港情未了 Hong Kong Love Continued. Columbia Records finally released Liew's debut album for the label, 不再娃娃 Not a Little Girl Anymore the next year, marking Hong Kong Love Continued the final BMG release for Liew.

== Track listings ==
=== 香港情 Hong Kong Love (1991) ===
1. 錯便錯到底 (If it is a Mistake, then Commit the Mistake Fully)
2. 小風波 (Little Storm)
3. 後悔 (Regret)
4. 廣播道神話 (The Legend of Broadcast Drive)
5. 緣 (Fate)
6. 異鄉邂逅 (Encounter in a Foreign Land)
7. 自甘墮落 (Self-Deserved Demise)
8. Mind Made Up
9. 清晨 (Early Morning)
10. Give Me All Your Love, Boy
11. 風情 (Wind Love)
12. 事前 (Beforehand)
13. 事後 (Afterwards)

=== 香港情未了 Hong Kong Love Continued (1991) ===
1. 新年願望 (New Year Resolution)
2. 霓虹鳥 (Neon Bird) [ Disco Rearranged Version ]
3. 一對舊皮鞋 (A Pair of Old Loafers)
4. 也許是愛 (Maybe It's Love)
5. 街邊派對 (Street Side Party)
6. 感覺 (Feeling)
7. 忘情 (Forgotten Love)
8. 隔 (Separated)
9. 請求 (Please)
10. 痴心誤會 (Loving Misunderstanding)
11. 我笑說 (I Said Jokingly)
12. 六本木的榻榻米 (Tatami at Roppongi)
13. 夜已變得騷了 (The Night Has Become Horny)
