= On the Wrong Track =

1983 Hong Kong film by Clarence Fok

- DVD cover
- Traditional Chinese: 毀滅號地車
- Simplified Chinese: 毁灭号地车
- Hanyu Pinyin: Huì Miè Hào Dì Chē
- Jyutping: Wai2 Mit6 Hou6 Dei6 Ce1
- Directed by: Clarence Fok
- Screenplay by: Shaw Creative Group
- Produced by: Mona Fong
- Starring: Andy Lau; Jeem Yim; Elliot Ngok; Prudence Liew; Winnie Chin
- Cinematography: Siu Yuen-chi
- Edited by: Chiang Hsing-lung; Lau Shiu-kwong
- Music by: Michael Lai
- Production company: Shaw Brothers Studio
- Distributed by: Shaw Brothers Studio
- Release date: 15 April 1983
- Running time: 88 minutes
- Country: Hong Kong
- Language: Cantonese
- Box office: HK$2,554,649

On the Wrong Track is a 1983 Hong Kong action drama film directed by Clarence Fok. The film stars Andy Lau in the lead role (in his third film overall), as well as Jeem Yim, Elliot Ngok, Prudence Liew and Winnie Chin in her feature film debut.

== Plot ==
Paul Chan (Andy Lau) is a proper and well-mannered 17-year old secondary school student. However, he often hangs out with his hot-headed, rebellious younger brother, Dee (Jeen Yim) and friends who engage in destructive activities such as blowing up a rich man's car after being insulted by him. On the other hand, their father, Larry (Elliot Ngok) is a prison officer who is strict towards his sons. One time, one of their friends humiliated a girl and got into a fight with her boyfriend's gang. It was stopped by police officer, King Kong, who have also threatened Paul. One night, Paul and Dee sneaked out from home to join their friends and continued the fight. Dee was injured and stayed with a prostitute, while Paul sneaked back home, but was caught by Larry. He was informed by King Kong about what happened. On the next day at school, Paul was being punished when his brother and classmates were fooling around. They even put underwear on his head before they would get into further trouble for bringing weapons in class as they prepared for a fight with students from a rival school. As a result, Larry punished Paul and Dee by having them clean the house without giving them dinner. However, at mid-night, Larry cooked noodles for Dee, but neglected Paul.

The next morning, Paul received a mail that he failed his SAT. While dejected, he bumped into Sze, whom he discovered to be a Vietnamese refugee. On the latter part, Larry planned to marry his girlfriend (Winnie Chin). He told Paul and Dee about his intention of marriage, but Dee was not happy about it. He stormed out and met with his friends while Paul just followed. They saw King Kong and stole his car which Dee used in doing something illegal which he ended being injured. As they went home, Larry slapped Dee and Paul for not looking out for his brother and threw them out the house. The next morning, Paul decided to skip class and bumped into Sze, who asked about his bruise on his face. He said he was beaten by Japanese thugs, but Larry suddenly pulled him up and apologized for hitting him last night. At night, Paul sneaked into the refugee camp and was shocked to find out Sze has a child, but this did not dismay him and pursued dating her. One time, they shopped at the supermarket and Sze was accused of stealing by the boss. She was insulted her and Paul was slapped. Dee interfered and caused a fight with the security. Larry found out about what happened since the boss is his girlfriend's mother.

After another punishment, Paul and Dee found out that their parents would send them to Taiwan.They were flustered for Paul planned to study in America while Dee disliked Taiwan's mandatory military service. They blamed their father's girlfriend, so they initiated to destroy her mother's supermarket. However, King Kong and his squad arrived so they flee the scene. King Kong caught up with Paul and Dee. After a scuffle, King Kong shot and killed Dee while Paul got arrested and imprisoned. In prison, Paul disowned his father in front of everyone and later inflicted self harm.

After his release from prison, Paul's behavior became more aggressive and would fight with gangsters who tried to hit on Sze. Paul's friend, Roger organized a settlement with the gangsters' boss, who challenged Paul to an auto race, where Paul won while his opponent's car was crushed and exploded. Later, Paul discovered Sze will be sent to New Guinea so he pleaded his father to allow him to marry her but his father refused. Upset, Paul went to see Sze at the refugee camp but got into a fight with other refugees who were peeking at them so he was arrested where he was taunted by King Kong at the police station. Paul sneaked into the refugee camp again, but this time, King Kong arrived and ordered his subordinates to forcibly takes Sze away from him.

Paul decided to settle the score with King Kong and lured him to a closed shopping mall. Paul surprised him with a car and chased him while Kong attempted to shoot Paul. After running over King Kong, Paul got out of his car and slashed King Kong with a knife and grabbed his revolver and continued chasing him. King Kong attempted to hide but Paul found him. He challenged him who can kill each other first. Paul emptied King Kong's pistol with one bullet before handing it back to him while Paul backed up his car and ran it towards King Kong. However, King Kong managed to shoot Paul in the head behind his car.

== Cast ==
- Andy Lau as Paul Chan (陳保羅), a well-meaning, mild mannered, 17-year-old secondary school student. After witnessing his younger brother being murdered, he becomes aggressive and rebellious, becoming a juvenile delinquent.
- Jeem Yim as Dee (大B), Paul's hot-headed and rebellious younger brother who often engages in reckless and illegal activities.
- Elliot Ngok as Larry Chan, Paul and Dee's father who is a prison officer and is strict towards his sons, not allowing them much freedom.
- Prudence Liew as Sze (阿詩), Paul's girlfriend who is a Vietnamese refugee and mother of an infant child.
- Winnie Chin as Larry's girlfriend who Dee greatly dislikes.
- Wai Kei-shun
- Tin Mat as Mrs. Cheung, Uncle Cheung's young wife who cheated on him.
- Stephen Shiu as a rich man whose car was blown up by Paul and Dee and their friends after he insults them. (cameo)
- Tai Yuet-ngor
- Lau Kwok-sing as King Kong, a police officer who picks on Paul and Dee.
- Hui Ying-ying as the mother of Larry's girlfriend who is a supermarket owner and falsely accused Sze of theft.
- Chan Po-cheung
- Ricky Wong
- Ngai Tim-choi as a prison guard.
- Rocky Wong as a prison guard.
- Ng Wui as Uncle Cheung (張伯), Roger's grandfather who Paul goes to when he is upset.
- Cheung Lai-ping as Chiu's date.
- Danny Poon as Roger, Paul and Dee's friend and classmate.
- Chin Tsi-ang
- Yat Poon-chai as a cop.
- Cheung Chi-hung as refugee at camp.
- Luk Ying-hung as a cop.
- Fong Yue
- Wong Kung-miu as Paul and Dee's teacher.
- Cheung Chok-chow
- Ngai Tung-kwa

== Theme song ==
- Break Into New Grounds (闖進新領域)
  - Composer: Michael Lai
  - Lyricist: Cheng Kwok-kong
  - Singer: Leslie Cheung

== Box office ==
The film grossed Hong-Kong $2,554,649 (dollars) at the Hong Kong box office during its theatrical run from 15 to 22 April 1983 in Hong Kong.

== See also ==
- Andy Lau filmography
