= 1987 Jade Solid Gold Best Ten Music Awards Presentation =

Hong Kong music awards ceremony

The 1987 Jade Solid Gold Best Ten Music Awards Presentation (Chinese: 1987年度十大勁歌金曲頒獎典禮) was held in January 1988. It is part of the Jade Solid Gold Best Ten Music Awards Presentation series held in Hong Kong.

== Top 10 song awards ==
The top 10 songs (十大勁歌金曲) of 1987 are as follows.

| Song name in Chinese | Artist(s) |
|---|---|
| 知心當玩偶 | Alan Tam |
| 灰色 | Sandy Lam |
| 別人的歌 | Raidas (band) |
| 烈燄紅唇 | Anita Mui |
| 流下眼淚前 | Paula Tsui |
| 無邊的思憶 | Alan Tam |
| Don't Say Goodbye | Alan Tam |
| 太陽星辰 | Jacky Cheung |
| 海誓山盟 | George Lam |
| 無心睡眠 | Leslie Cheung |

== Additional awards ==
| Award | Song name (if available for award) | Recipient(s) |
|---|---|---|
| The Best Composition Award (最佳作曲獎) | >地球大合唱 (English: The Earth Chorus) | Composer: Joseph Koo; Performed by: Zung Sing (眾星) |
| The Best Lyric Award (最佳填詞獎) | 石頭記 | Lyrics by: Keith Chan (陳少琪), Mai-hak (邁克), Zuni Icosahedron (進念二十面體); Performed by: Tat Ming Pair |
| The Best Music Arrangement Award (最佳編曲獎) | 無心睡眠 | Leslie Cheung |
| The Best Record Album Produced Award (最佳唱片監製獎) | 劉美君 | Music Producer by: Joseph Chan; Performed by: Prudence Liew |
| The Most Popular Group Award (最佳樂隊組合) | --- | Tat Ming Pair (達明一派) (Band members: Anthony Wong Yiu Ming, Tats Lau) |
| The Best Music Video Production Award (最佳音樂錄影帶製作) | 激情 | Directed by: Stella Chan; Performed by: Sandy Lam |
| The Best Music Video Performance Award (最佳音樂錄影帶演出獎) | 似火探戈 | Anita Mui |
| The Most Popular Male Artist Award (最受歡迎男歌星獎) | --- | Alan Tam |
| The Most Popular Female Artist Award (最受歡迎女歌星獎) | --- | Anita Mui |
| Gold Song Gold Award (金曲金獎) | 無心睡眠 | Leslie Cheung |
| Jade Solid Gold Honour Award (勁歌金曲榮譽大獎) | 地球大合唱 | Cantopop stars united |
