= Loving Prince =

Loving Prince 公子多情

Studio album by Prudence Liew
- Released: October 1988
- Recorded: 1987–1988
- Genre: Cantopop
- Length: 45:31
- Label: Current
- Producer: Joseph Chan

Prudence Liew chronology
Hit Mix (1988)	Loving Prince 公子多情 (1988)	Fate 緣 (1989)

Alternate cover
- LP Record version cover.

Singles from Prudence Liew
- 1. "公子多情 Loving Prince"; 2. "一見鍾情 Love at First Sight"; 3. "廣播道神話 The Legend of Broadcast Drive"

Gongzi Docing (Cantonese 公子多情 Loving Prince) is the third studio album of cantopop singer Prudence Liew, released in October 1988.

== Album information ==
This album contains less covers than her previous album, Why; however two of the three covers made it as singles. The title track and lead single "公子多情 Loving Prince" is actually a Chinese song from 1965 albeit with updated lyrics written by Liew herself. The second single is "一見鍾情 Love at First Sight", a cover of the Tiffany song "I Saw Him Standing There", which in itself was a cover of the 1963 Beatles tune, "I Saw Her Standing There". The track "討厭 Annoying" is a cover version of Fairground Attraction's song "Perfect".

The third single to release from the album is "廣播道神話 The Legend of Broadcast Drive". It is a song about Broadcast Drive in Kowloon, which at the time was home to four of Hong Kong's media outlets: Radio Television Hong Kong (RTHK), Television Broadcasts Limited (TVB), Asia Television (ATV), and Commercial Radio Hong Kong (CRHK).

== Track listing ==
No.	Title	Lyrics	Music	Length
1.	"廣播道神話 (The Legend of Broadcast Drive)"	Yuen Leung Poon	Joseph Chow	4:47
2.	"也許是愛 (Maybe It's Love)"	Albert Leung	John Laudon	4:59
3.	"討厭 (Annoying)"	Richard Lam	Mark E. Nevin	3:42
4.	"燃點真愛 (Igniting Real Love)" (with Danny Chan & Priscilla Chan)	Kwok Kong Cheng	Danny Chan, Dominic Chow	4:29
5.	"風情 (Wind Love)"	Anonymous	Joseph Chan	4:48
6.	"公子多情 (Loving Prince)"	Bo Sung Lo, Prudence Liew	Anonymous	3:22
7.	"一見鍾情 (Love at First Sight)"	Cheuk Fai Lau	Lennon–McCartney	3:48
8.	"明天止步 (Stopping Tomorrow)"	Siu May	Michael Lai	4:12
9.	"痴心誤會 (Loving Misunderstanding)"	Siu May	Richard Yung	4:20
10.	"浪漫時光 (Romantic Time)"	Andrew Lam	Tommy Chui	3:30
11.	"甜甜小公主 (The Sweet Princess)"	Kwok Kong Cheng	Joseph Chan	3:34
Total length:				45:31
