= Linger (album) =

Linger 依依

Studio album by Prudence Liew
- Released: September 1990; September 23, 2005 (re-issue)
- Recorded: June 1990
- Genre: Cantopop
- Label: BMG
- Producer: Prudence Liew

Prudence Liew chronology
赤裸感覺 The Naked Feeling (1990)	Linger 依依 (1990)	Love & Passion (1990)

Singles from 依依 Linger
- 1. "這麼那麼怎麼 This, That, How?"; 2. "依依 Linger"; 3. "午夜傳真 Midnight Fax"

依依 Linger is the sixth studio album of cantopop singer Prudence Liew, released in September 1990.

== Background information ==
This album continues the trend of Liew's previous release, the concept album 赤裸感覺 The Naked Feeling of incorporating songs that deal with lust and sex. However, the lyrics have been toned down for this album due to pressure from her label, BMG Pacific to find a compromise between art and commercial cantopop music. In place of obvious depictions of sexual situations are clever innuendos that can be interpreted either innocent or naughty depending on the listener.

=== Singles ===
- Track 1: "這麼那麼怎麼 (This, That, How?)" is a cover of Dutch group Big Trouble's 1988 song, When the Love is Good. The song and its lyricist (周禮茂) are often praised for the use of double entendres throughout the song. When deciphered literally, the song is about a woman who is frustrated by her love's indecisiveness, and often has to tell him to do this, do that and teach him how to decide. Hence, the song title. However, the song can also be interpreted several ways:
1. In Cantonese, the character 麼, pronounced [mɔ́ː], has the same pronunciation as the character 摸, which means 'to touch'. Therefore, one of the ways the song is interpreted is the singer asking/telling her lover to touch her like this, touch her like that and how to touch her.
2. The second variation is interpreting "this" and "that" as references to non-distinct sexual activities as in the singer telling her lover to make love to her this way and that way.
- Track 6: "依依 (Linger)" is a cover of French singer Sylvie Maréchal's song "Longue Distance". This is a ballad about a woman asking her lover to linger and stay when he decides to leave her.
- Track 9: "午夜傳真 (Midnight Fax)" is about receiving faxes in the middle of the night detailing sexual images.

== Track listing ==
1. "這麼那麼怎麼 (This, That, How?)"
2. "蠢動 (Urging to Move)"
3. "六本木的榻榻米 (Tatami at Roppongi)"
4. "後悔 (Regret)"
5. "Your House Or My House"
6. "依依 (Linger)"
7. "延續 (Extend)"
8. "私人地帶 (Personal Zone)"
9. "午夜傳真 (Midnight Fax)"
10. "小風波 (Little Storm)"
