= Autumn Heart =

Autumn Heart 秋心

Studio album by Prudence Liew
- Released: December 1992; October 23, 2006 (re-issue)
- Recorded: September 1992
- Genre: Cantopop
- Label: Columbia
- Producer: Prudence Liew

Prudence Liew chronology
不再娃娃 Not a Little Girl Anymore (January 1992)	Autumn Heart 秋心 (1992)	被你縱壞 Spoiled By You (September 1993)

Singles from 秋心 Autumn Heart
- 1. "舊曲新愁 (Old Song, New Sorrow)"; 2. "你的雙眼如深秋 (Your Eyes Are Like a Deep Autumn)"; 3. "再讓我望你多一回 (Let Me Look at You One More Time)"

秋心 Autumn Heart is the ninth studio album of cantopop singer Prudence Liew, released in December 1992.

== Background information ==
The Chinese title of the album is derived from the two characters autumn (秋) and heart (心) that combine to form the portmanteau Chinese character, sorrow (愁). The hidden meaning of the title is that the album deals with songs of sorrow and woe. The lead single to the album, "舊曲新愁 (Old Song, New Sorrow)" is arranged into two different versions in the album: A Some Version is arranged in a more traditional Chinese way with the inclusion of Yangqin in the music background. A Heartache Version is more modern with a stronger beat and urban feel to the song.

== Track listing ==
1. 舊曲新愁 (Old Song, New Sorrow [A Some Version])
2. 女人心 (A Woman's Heart)
3. 你的雙眼如深秋 (Your Eyes Are Like a Deep Autumn)
4. 最後情人 (The Last Lover)
5. 舊曲新愁 (Old Song, New Sorrow [A Heartache Version])
6. 再讓我望你多一回 (Let Me Look at You One More Time)
7. 驟然 (Sometimes)
8. 愛上別人的伴侶 (Falling in Love with Someone Else's Mate)
9. 了不起 (Arrogance)
10. 醉生笑夢死 (A Drunken Life Laughing at a Dream's Death)
