= True Women for Sale =

2008 Hong Kong film by Herman Yau

True Women For Sale
- Official poster of True Women for Sale

Chinese name
- Traditional Chinese: 性工作者2: 我不賣身．我賣子宮
Transcriptions
- Directed by: Herman Yau
- Written by: Yeeshan Yang; Herman Yau
- Produced by: Ng Kin Hung
- Starring: Prudence Liew; Anthony Wong Chau Sang; Race Wong; Sammy Leung
- Cinematography: Joe Chan
- Edited by: Azrael Chung
- Music by: Mak Chun Hung
- Production company: China Star Entertainment Group
- Distributed by: Mei Ah Entertainment
- Release date: 4 December 2008
- Running time: 90 minutes
- Country: Hong Kong
- Language: Cantonese

True Women For Sale (性工作者2: 我不賣身．我賣子宮) is a 2008 Hong Kong drama film directed by Herman Yau and starring Prudence Liew and Anthony Wong Chau Sang.

== Plot ==
The story revolves around two women in the grassroots of Hong Kong society, struggling to survive and haunted by demons in their respective pasts. The literal translation of the Chinese film title is "I do not sell my body, I sell my uterus". In fact, it deals with one woman who does sells her body but strives to improve herself, and one woman who views herself to be of higher status than the street walkers, but in reality is also selling herself by marrying someone and becoming pregnant just to become a Hong Kong citizen. The two women live in the same apartment building and share some interactions on screen; however, their stories do not necessarily intermix. The film takes place in the Sham Shui Po area of Kowloon, Hong Kong circa 2000.

Lai Chung-Chung (Prudence Liew) is a crack cocaine-addicted yet good-natured street walker who is fast approaching a "destiny call" made by a fortune teller advising her that in the year 2000, she would finally repent all her sins from her previous life and will turn over a new leaf. To prepare herself for the life-changing event, she works hard to save up for a dentistry process to clean her badly decaying teeth and gums from years of crack cocaine use. After witnessing Lai heroically save a child from being hit by a van, freelance photographer Chi (Sammy Leung) thought that Lai would make a good human interest story for a magazine and starts to photograph Lai while having his girlfriend, journalist Elaine (Toby Leung) interview her. During Elaine's interview with Lai, it is revealed that Lai has had a troubled past with her mother and younger sister.

The other subject is Wong Lin-Fa (Race Wong), a woman from Mainland China who married Kin: a middle-aged, construction-working Hong Konger, in hopes of attaining a better life by gaining Hong Kong residency. Upon hearing Kin died in a work accident, Wong travels to Hong Kong, pregnant with Kin's child in hopes of collecting an abundance of condolence money from Kin's family. However, she only receives HK$5000 and is kicked out by the family, who labels Wong as a golddigger. She then moves into Kin's apartment in a building that many prostitutes inhabit, including Lai. Insurance broker Lau Fu-Yi (Anthony Wong Chau-Sang) notifies Wong that Kin had bought life insurance with her as the sole beneficiary. Lau later begins an unlikely friendship with Wong, helping her with her quest to give birth and gain residency in Hong Kong, all the while trying to sell her insurance. Lau has a way of classifying people in his head by calculating their potential insurance coverage. He does this for Lai and Chi and quickly dismisses them as having a potential of $0 while evaluating Wong at US$2 million.

== Cast ==
- Prudence Liew as Lai Chung-Chung
- Anthony Wong Chau-sang as Lau Fu-Yi
- Race Wong as Wong Lin-Fa
- Sammy Leung as Chi
- Toby Leung as Elaine
- Sherming Yiu as Yau Guen, Lai's confidante and fellow street walker
- Apple Chow as Pink Pink, Lai's friend and fellow street walker
- Jessie Meng as Dr. Lee, a Mainland Chinese doctor Lau is interested in
- Monie Tung as Sister Kot, a nun who empathises with the street walkers
- Fung Hak-on as Keung, Lai's regular client
- Derek Kwok as Leung, Wong's ex-boyfriend
- Jackie Ma as Lai Chung, Lai's ex-husband
- Yuka Yu as Kwai, Keung's wife from Mainland China
- Colour as Ying Ying, Lai Chung's current wife

=== Cameos ===
- Susan Shaw as Chung's mother
- Yumiko Cheng as Ob-Gyn Nurse
- Chapman To as Police Officer
- Louis Cheung as Social Worker
- Terence Siufay as Jacky, Lau's co-worker

== Awards and nominations ==
The film was selected as the opening film in the 2008 Hong Kong Asian Film Festival and was nominated for several awards.

Year	Award	Category	Nominee	Result	Reference
2008	Golden Horse Awards	Best Actress	Prudence Liew	Won	
2008	Hong Kong Film Critics Society Awards	Best Actress	Prudence Liew	Nominated	
2008	Hong Kong Film Critics Society Awards	Best Actor	Anthony Wong Chau Sang	Nominated	
2009	Hong Kong Film Awards	Best Actress	Prudence Liew	Nominated	
2009	Hong Kong Film Awards	Best Supporting Actress	Race Wong	Nominated	
2009	Ming Pao Weekly Magazine Awards	Most Outstanding Actress	Prudence Liew	Won	
