= Stolen Moments (Prudence Liew album) =

偷 Stolen Moments

Studio album by Prudence Liew
- Released: July 6, 2012
- Recorded: 2012
- Genre: Cantopop, Jazz, cover album, audiophile
- Length: 39:55
- Label: Cinepoly
- Producer: Prudence Liew; Alex Fung; Jerald Chan

Prudence Liew chronology
Love Addict (2011)	偷 Stolen Moments (2012)	Reincarnated Love (2017)

Singles from 偷 Stolen Moments
- 1. "怪你過份美麗 (Blaming You For Being Too Beautiful) / 戀愛大過天 (Loving is More Important Than the Sky) / 烈燄紅唇 (Red Hot Lips)" Released: June 1, 2012

偷 Stolen Moments is the 15th studio album by Hong Kong singer Prudence Liew. This is the second in a series of three cover albums released by Liew in three different languages: the Mandarin album Love Addict was previously released in June 2011, and the English album Reincarnated Love released in July 2017.

== Album information ==
The reasoning behind naming the album "偷 Stolen Moments" is actually explained on the cover of the album:

偷是兩個字的組成 人和俞 俞者：安定，允許，愉快
人站在那安定，允許和愉快之間，有誰會抗拒那些感覺，所以很自然地會戀上了偷。
([The Chinese character] "steal" is a combination of two different characters: "person" and "enjoy". A person who is enjoying is stable, accepting, happy. When a person stands in the realm of stability, acceptance and happiness, who would resist that feeling? And therefore [the person] will naturally fall in love with stealing.)

— Prudence Liew, Stolen Moments album cover, Universal Music Hong Kong, July 2012

Liew stated that she immensely enjoyed the recording session, hence a person and enjoyment combined to form the Chinese character "steal". In the liner notes, Liew explained that in the process of covering another person's work, besides paying the royalty fees to the record companies, no permissions were granted by the original artists, composers, and lyricists, and therefore is a form of stealing from their artistic moments.

Of the ten songs on the album, a more pop version of "左右手 (My Left and Right Hands)" was previously included on the Leslie Cheung tribute album, ReImagine Leslie Cheung released by Universal Music Hong Kong earlier in the year. The first printing of this album had the compact discs pressed in Germany at Arvato Bertelsmann to ensure the audio quality of the album was preserved. The album is released as a double album, with the second disc being a bonus DVD with music videos of all ten tracks.

== Release and chart history ==
Universal Music Hong Kong promoted the album by releasing a triple single on June 1, 2012, of three tracks "怪你過份美麗 (Blaming You For Being Too Beautiful)", "戀愛大過天 (Loving is More Important Than the Sky)", and "烈燄紅唇 (Red Hot Lips)" for digital download and radio airplay. The songs did not chart on the major commercial radio stations, but all three songs charted on the MOOV Top 100 Singles Chart, the official Hong Kong digital singles download and online airplay chart, with "怪你過份美麗 (Blaming You For Being Too Beautiful)" debuting within the top 20 at number 14, and the other two tracks charting in the top 40 for the week ending June 10, 2012.

The album was released on July 6, 2012, in Hong Kong. The album debuted on the HMV Cantonese/Mandarin Chart at number 6, and its Overall Sales Chart at number 19, the lowest debut positions for Liew since her return to music in 2008. However, for the week ending July 15, 2012, the album peaked at number 2 on the Cantonese/Mandarin Chart, and rose 12 positions to number 7 on the Overall Sales Chart.

Upon the release of the album, the single "戀愛大過天 (Loving is More Important Than the Sky)" jumped 66 places on the MOOV Top 100 Singles Chart, rising from number 72 to number 6, cracking the top 10 for the week ending July 15, 2012, and beating its original peak position of 29 back at the time of the single's release in June. Several non-single tracks also entered the chart that same week, briefly appearing in the lower half of the chart, before dropping out the next week.

== Track listing ==
No.	Title	Lyrics	Music	Original artist	Length
1.	"戀愛大過天 (Loving is More Important Than the Sky)"	Albert Leung	Ronald Ng	Twins	4:48
2.	"烈燄紅唇 (Red Hot Lips)"	Wai Yuen Poon	Anthony Lun	Anita Mui	3:16
3.	"明知故犯 (Knowingly Commit the Crime)"	Albert Leung	Jia Ming Chen	Mavis Hee	4:25
4.	"春光乍洩 (Baring All)"	Albert Leung	Jason Choi, Anthony Wong	Anthony Wong	3:56
5.	"小城大事 (Big Matters in a Small Town)"	Albert Leung	Mark Lui	Miriam Yeung	3:36
6.	"灰色 (Gray)"	Richard Lam	Iris Fernando, Tambi Fernando, Wayne Brown	Sandy Lam	3:34
7.	"甜蜜如軟糖 (Sweet Like Soft Candy)"	Richard Lam	Mahmood Rumjahn	Amy Chan	3:31
8.	"午夜麗人 (Midnight Lady)"	Jolland Chan	Dominic Chow	Alan Tam	3:42
9.	"怪你過份美麗 (Blaming You For Being Too Beautiful)"	Albert Leung	Gary Tong	Leslie Cheung	4:37
10.	"左右手 (My Left and Right Hands)"	Albert Leung	Jimmy Ye	Leslie Cheung	4:35
Total length:					39:55

== Chart peak positions ==
=== Album ===
Chart	Peak position
HMV Hong Kong Overall Sales Chart	7
HMV Hong Kong Asian Sales Chart	3
HMV Hong Kong Cantonese/Mandarin Sales Chart	2

=== Singles ===
Song title	Release date	MOOV Top 100
怪你過份美麗 (Blaming You For Being Too Beautiful)	06/01/2012	14
戀愛大過天 (Loving is More Important Than the Sky)	06/01/2012	6
烈燄紅唇 (Red Hot Lips)	06/01/2012	35

=== Other charted songs ===
Song title	MOOV Top 100
明知故犯 (Knowingly Commit the Crime)	79
小城大事 (Big Matters in a Small Town)	88
春光乍洩 (Baring All)	92
灰色 (Gray)	98
