= Jokingly Saying =

Jokingly Saying 笑說

Studio album by Prudence Liew
- Released: August 1989; August 1, 2006 (re-issue)
- Recorded: 1988–1989
- Genre: Cantopop
- Length: 44:05
- Label: BMG
- Producer: Joseph Chan

Prudence Liew chronology
Remixes (1989)	Jokingly Saying 笑說 (1989)	赤裸感覺 The Naked Feeling (1990)

Singles from 笑說 Jokingly Saying
- 1. "愛是無涯 Love Has No Boundaries"; 2. "街邊派對 Street Side Party"; 3. "有人 Someone"

Sieu seoi (笑說 Jokingly Saying) is the fourth studio album of cantopop singer Prudence Liew, released in August 1989.

== Background information ==
After her maternity leave, Liew released this album in August 1989. This is also her first album to be released by BMG Pacific as it had just acquired Current Records. This album was a mixture of locally composed songs and covers of rather well-known American and Japanese songs. Of the three singles, two were covers and one was an original composition.

Also included in this album was the song "Fate 緣", which was previously released on the EP of the same title.

=== Covers ===
- Track 1: "愛是無涯 (Love Has No Boundaries)" was a cover of Frances Yip's Cantonese version of Cliff Richard's 1984 single, "Ocean Deep". Liew's version was released as the lead single off this album.
- Track 3: "Yesterday Dreamer" was a cover of J-pop singer Yū Hayami's song of the same title, released in 1988.
- Track 5: "你說是甜我說苦 (Your Words Are Sweet, Mine Are Bitter)" was a cover of "Don't It Make My Brown Eyes Blue", made famous by Crystal Gayle in 1977.
- Track 7: "有人 (Someone)" was a cover of the Brian Hyland hit from 1962, "Sealed with a Kiss". This song created buzz due to Australian singer Jason Donovan's cover version, which topped the UK Singles Chart for two weeks in June 1989. BMG Music quickly secured the rights for this song in Hong Kong for Liew and pushed her to record it. The arrangement of Liew's version changed the original gentle ballad into a dance song with a pulsating beat. It was released as the third single of the album.

== Track listing ==
No.	Title	Lyrics	Music	Length
1.	"愛是無涯 (Love Has No Boundaries)"	Ching Chuen Tong	Rodney Trott, Jonathan Sweet	5:18
2.	"我笑說 (I Said Jokingly)"	Chan Siu Kei	Peter Wong	4:28
3.	"Yesterday Dreamer"	Man Cheng Yat	Christian Bruhn, Erica Bruhn, D. Votion	4:37
4.	"慢鏡 (Slow-Motion)"	Richard Lam	Van Den Heuvel, Verheye	3:59
5.	"你說是甜我說苦 (Your Words Are Sweet, Mine Are Bitter)"	Yuen Leung Poon	Richard Leigh	3:27
6.	"街邊派對 (Street Side Party)"	Richard Lam	Richard Yung	4:38
7.	"有人 (Someone)"	Albert Leung	Peter Udell, Gary Geld	4:21
8.	"異鄉邂逅 (Encounter in a Foreign Land)"	Thomas Chow	Kwong Wing Chan	3:45
9.	"消極的愛 (Depressing Love)"	Cheuk Fai Lau	Henry Lai	4:45
10.	"緣 (Fate)"	Yuen Leung Poon	Joseph Chan	4:47
Total length:				44:05
