= The Naked Feeling =

The Naked Feeling 赤裸感覺

Studio album by Prudence Liew
- Released: January 1990
- Recorded: October 1989
- Genre: Cantopop
- Length: 49:27
- Label: BMG
- Producer: Prudence Liew; Tony Kiang

Prudence Liew chronology
笑說 Jokingly Saying (1989)	The Naked Feeling 赤裸感覺 (1990)	依依 Linger (1990)

Singles from 赤裸感覺 The Naked Feeling
- 1. "我估不到 I Could Not Have Guessed"; 2. "玩玩 Play Play"; 3. "事後 Afterwards"

Chìluǒ gǎnjué (赤裸感覺 The Naked Feeling) is the fifth studio album of cantopop singer Prudence Liew, released in January 1990.

== Background information ==
This is the first album that is not produced by Joseph Chan, Liew's longtime collaborator. Instead Liew decided to co-produce this album with Tony Kiang. Liew veered away from the normal conservative cantopop ballads and Europop dance songs and instead came up with this concept album surrounding sex, adultery and lust. The Naked Feeling is often referred to as Liew's most risqué studio release as the theme is considered taboo in Chinese culture. The album's content ultimately hurt the airplay of the third single, Afterwards 事後, which deals with sexual pleasure. Several radio stations including RTHK Radio 2 banned this song from their playlist due to its explicit nature. However, Commercial Radio Hong Kong promoted the song on heavy rotation.

Despite its mature content, the album still sold relatively well in Hong Kong, ensuring Gold Record status certified by the IFPI. This is the only Liew studio album released under Current Records/BMG Music that was not re-issued as part of the Legendary Collection in 2005 by Sony BMG.

=== Singles ===
- Track 4: "我估不到 (I Could Not Have Guessed)" is a cover of the Belgian musical group Vaya Con Dios' single, Puerto Rico released in 1987. This song is about a woman who is seeing two men at once. In the end, one man leaves her, and the other one commits suicide and she is ultimately left alone, regretting her choices. This song is known for the repeating "Ai-yai-yai-yai-yai-yah" line in its chorus.
- Track 1: "玩玩 (Play Play)" is a cover of Britpop singer Samantha Fox's hit single I Wanna Have Some Fun, released in 1988. The content deals with a bored housewife openly announcing to her husband that she is cheating on him.
- Track 11: "事後 (Afterwards)", as mentioned above, is a lusty ballad about lovers, after achieving orgasm, reminiscing the pleasures of sexual intercourse that just happened.

== Track listing ==
No.	Title	Lyrics	Music	Length
1.	"玩玩 (Play Play)"	Richard Lam	Full Force	4:18
2.	"赤裸抱月下 (Naked Embrace Under the Moon)"	Jolland Chan	Tony Kiang	3:58
3.	"破例 (Breaking the Rules)"	Thomas Chow	Andrew Tuason	4:04
4.	"我估不到 (I Could Not Have Guessed)"	Thomas Chow	Dirk Schoufs, Danielle Schoovaarts	4:30
5.	"有誰知我此時情 (Who Would Know My Feelings Now)"	Shengqiong Nie	Wong Jim	3:55
6.	"事前 (Beforehand)"	Richard Lam	Joey Ou	4:36
7.	"來吧 (Come On)"	Richard Lam	Ryudo Uzaki	4:30
8.	"眼睛殺手 (The Eyes Killer)"	Thomas Chow	Gary Tong	4:40
9.	"心魔 (Demon of the Heart)"	Anonymous	Prudence Liew	4:54
10.	"感覺 (Feeling)"	Thomas Chow	Anthony Lun	4:50
11.	"事後 (Afterwards)"	Richard Lam	Andrew Tuason	5:12
Total length:				49:27
