= Listen to Me (album) =

Listen to Me 聽我細訴

Studio album by Prudence Liew
- Released: February 1991; October 23, 2006 (re-issue)
- Recorded: November 1990
- Genre: Cantopop
- Label: BMG
- Producer: Prudence Liew

Prudence Liew chronology
Love & Passion (1990)	Listen to Me 聽我細訴 (1991)	Love & Passion 2 (1991)

Singles from 聽我細訴 Listen to Me
- 1. "天長地久 Forever and Eternal"; 2. "夜已變得騷了 The Night Has Become Horny"

聽我細訴 Listen to Me is the seventh studio album of cantopop singer Prudence Liew, released in February 1991.

== Background information ==
This album marks the end of the working relationship between Liew and Current Records/BMG Music after 6 years. Because Liew had already opted not to renew her contract with BMG Music and signing with Columbia Records upon the release of this album, thus the album was minimally advertised and only two singles were released.

=== Singles ===
- Track 8: "天長地久 Forever and Eternal" is a cover of the mandopop ballad "你會愛我很久嗎 Will You Love Me For a Long While?" by Taiwanese singer Michelle Pan.
- Track 9: "夜已變得騷了 The Night Has Become Horny" is a light acid jazz song depicting how the night is ripe for lovemaking.

== Track listing ==
1. 二十一世紀女人心 (The Heart of a 21st Century Woman)
2. 貼面舞 (Face-to-Face Dance)
3. 夢中情人 (Dream Lover)
4. 多些給我那些 (Give Me More of That)
5. 吧 (Bah)
6. 我 (Me)
7. 雪女 (Snow Girl)
8. 天長地久 (Forever and Eternal)
9. 夜已變得騷了 (The Night Has Become Horny)
10. 新年願望 (New Year Resolution)
11. 寄語 (Sent Words)
