= Not a Little Girl Anymore (Prudence Liew album) =

Not a Little Girl Anymore 不再娃娃

Studio album by Prudence Liew
- Released: January 1992; October 23, 2006 (re-issue)
- Recorded: October 1991
- Genre: Cantopop
- Label: Columbia
- Producer: Prudence Liew

Prudence Liew chronology
| 香港情未了 Hong Kong Love Continued (1991) | Not a Little Girl Anymore 不再娃娃 (1992) | 秋心 Autumn Heart (1992) |

Singles from 不再娃娃 Not a Little Girl Anymore
- 1. "各自各… 精彩 (Each Shining Their Own Way)"; 2. "小驚大怪 (Little Scare, Big Reaction)"; 3. "娃娃歲月 (The Ages of a Little Girl)"

不再娃娃 Not a Little Girl Anymore is the eighth studio album of cantopop singer Prudence Liew, released in January 1992.

== Background information ==
This is the first Liew studio album released by Columbia Records. Sony Music Hong Kong reportedly spent over $ 1 million in recording equipment for the recording of this album. Unlike previous albums that include multiple cover versions of Europop songs, the entirety of this album are original compositions. Among the composers and lyricists working on this album include Conrad Wong, Dick Lee, Tai Chi, Tony Arevejo Jr. and Liew herself.

== Track listing ==
1. 各自各… 精彩 (Each Shining Their Own Way)
2. 小驚大怪 (Little Scare, Big Reaction)
3. Touch Me Feel Me
4. 思潮 (Waves of Thoughts)
5. 不著地的飛鳥 (A Never Descending Bird)
6. China Girl
7. 娃娃歲月 (The Ages of a Little Girl)
8. 死心塌地 (Devoted)
9. 釋放 (Releasing)
10. Wooh!
