= Metro Broadcast Corporation =

Private radio broadcasting company in Hong Kong

Metro Broadcast Corporation Ltd.
- Company type: Subsidiary
- Industry: Radio broadcasting webcasting
- Founded: 1991
- Headquarters: Hung Hom, Kowloon Central
- Key people: Li Chak Kui Victor
- Parent: CK Hutchison Holdings
- Website: Official website

Metro Broadcast Corporation
- Traditional Chinese: 新城廣播有限公司
- Simplified Chinese: 新城广播有限公司
Transcriptions
Standard Mandarin
- Hanyu Pinyin: Xīnchéng Guǎngbò Yǒuxiàngōngsī
Yue: Cantonese
- Yale Romanization: Sān sìhng gwóng bo yáuh haahn gūng sī
- Jyutping: San^{1} sing^{4} gwong^{2} bo^{3} jau^{5} haan^{6} gung^{1} si^{1}

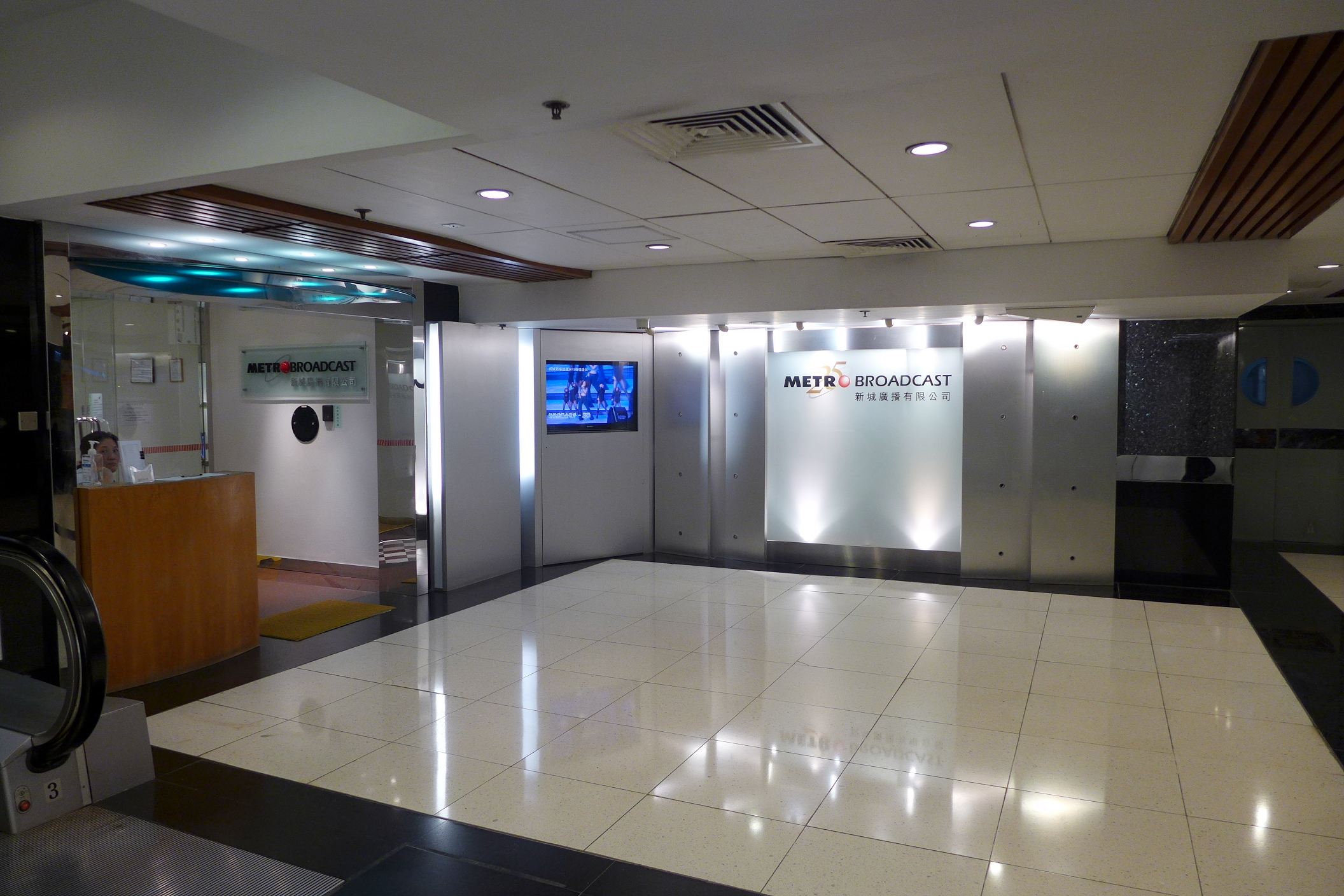
Metro Broadcast Office in Whampoa Garden

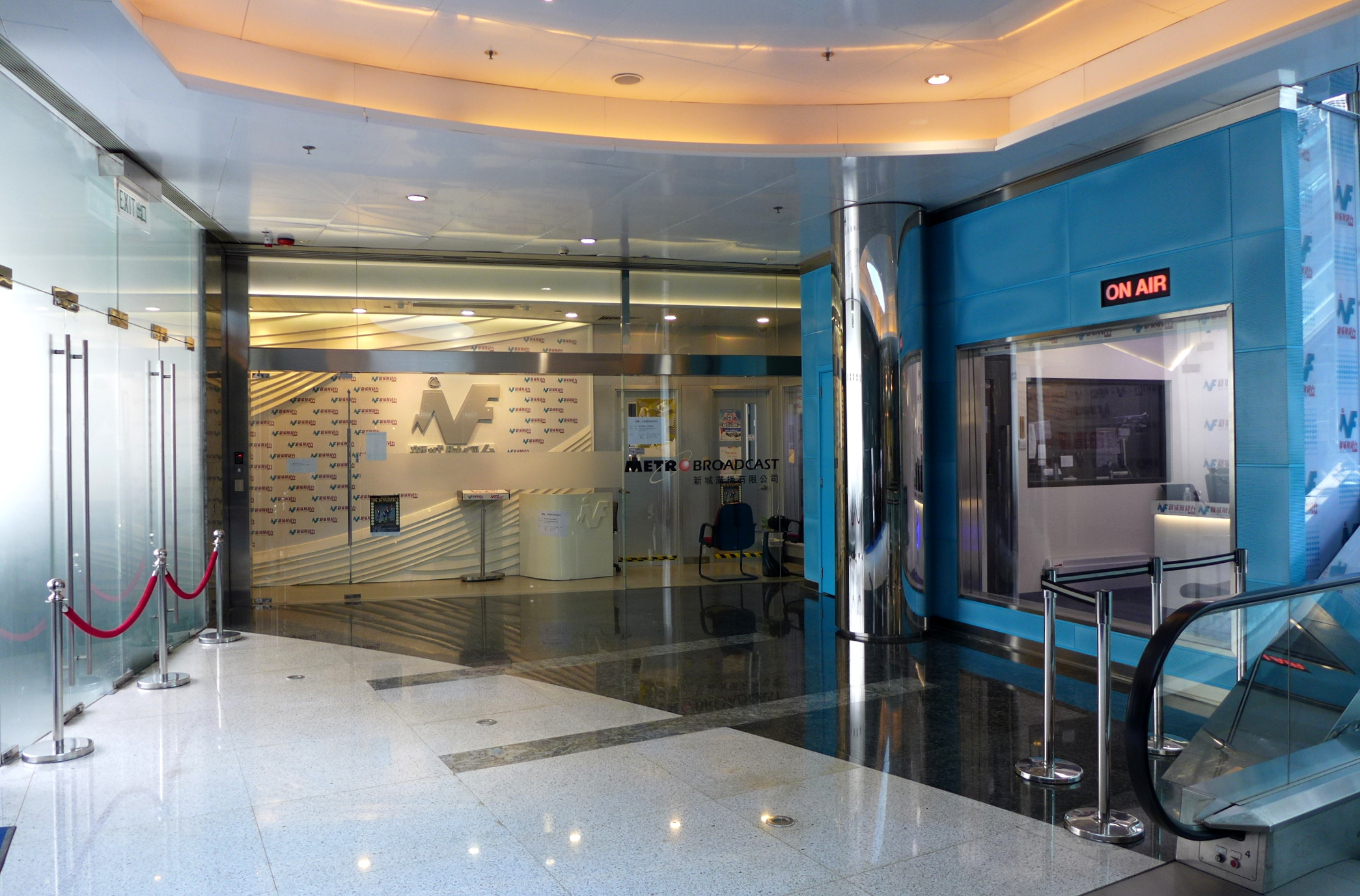
Metro Broadcast Studio in Central

Metro Broadcast Corporation Ltd. (Chinese: 新城廣播有限公司) is one of Hong Kong's three radio broadcasting corporations. It was founded on 1 July 1991, and is owned by the Hong Kong-listed CK Hutchison Holdings.

== Services ==
Metro Broadcast operates three radio channels: Metro Finance (FM104), Metro Info (FM99.7), Metro Plus (AM 1044, the only English channel). The company also offered Metro Finance Digital (DAB+), Metro Music Digital (DAB+) and Metro Life Digital (DAB+) until the company announced its intention to return its digital audio broadcasting license in September 2016. The digital audio broadcasting license was terminated in November that same year.

Metro also offers multimedia broadcasting service through mobile phones, via the mobile phone service provider 3 Mobile. In addition, Metro offers eSHOP, an online shopping website.

In 2003, the Hong Kong Government renewed Metro's broadcasting license for 12 years, with the renewal taking effect in 2004. The license was renewed for a further 12 years on March 22, 2016, with the extension taking effect on August 25 of the same year.

== History ==
In 1989, the Hong Kong government reformed radio broadcasting regulations, allowing the introduction of a third radio station. It released the license to Metro Radio.

In 1991, Metro Radio set up its headquarters in Site 11 Whampoa Garden in Hunghom, Kowloon (香港九龍紅磡黃埔花園 第十一期). At that time, Metro Radio had two Chinese channels- channel FM99.7 (勁歌台) and channel FM104 (金曲台) and an English channel - AM 1044 (Metro News).

In 1994, Philip Chan Yan Kin (陈欣健) took over as General Manager and revised many of its programs. In 1996 Metro Radio carried out a strategic shift of focus from news services to entertainment. The names of channel FM99.7 (勁歌台) and channel FM104 (金曲台) were changed to Hit Radio (新城997) and FM Select (精選104) respectively, and Metro News became Metro Plus. In the same year, Chan Hoi-kei (陳海琪) resigned as leader, and was replaced by Bak wan-kam (白韻琴).

In 1997 due to an expansion, the head office of Metro Radio moved to Basement 2 Site 6 Whampoa Garden, Hunghom, Kowloon (香港九龍紅磡黃埔花園第六期地庫二層).

In 1998 the company set up another broadcasting station in Central's The Center (中環中心), Hong Kong Island.

On 22 January 2001, it changed the name of Hit Radio (新城997) to Metro Showbiz (新城娛樂台). On 5 February, FM Select (精選104) was renamed Metro Finance (新城財經台).

In 2004,, Metro Radio expanded its broadcasting in the Pearl River Delta by entering into a shared programming agreement with Radio Guangdong (廣東電台).

On 2 January 2008, Metro Showbiz was renamed to Metroinfo (新城知訊台). Metroinfo broadcast both entertainment and financial programs.

The CEO of Metro Radio was Kam Kwok-leung (甘國亮) and the director of Metroinfo was Chu Ming-yui (朱明銳) in the past.

== Current channels ==
=== Metro Finance (FM 104) ===
Metro Finance started up on 5 February 2001. The station delivers content relating to different information in the financial field.

Metro Finance World also organizes investment talks throughout the year. The chief executive officers of companies and investment banks or other financial commentators are invited to make speeches. Tso, the special column writer of "Investment Diary" in the Hong Kong Economic Journal, is an event organizer as well as a keynote speaker in these talks. Market trends are discussed, as well as investment advice for the audience. The talks are later broadcast by Metro Finance and other media in China.

=== Metro Info (FM 99.7) ===
Metro Showbiz broadcasts entertainment news hourly, 24 hours a day since 22 January 2001.

==== Hit awards ====
Every year Television Broadcast Limited (TVB), Commercial Radio, RTHK and Metro Radio present awards to outstanding singers, composers and authors for outstanding performance in the entertainment industry. Metro Radio holds the Hit Awards annually at the end of December (usually on Boxing Day, i.e. 26 December), which is the first award among the four. The Hit Awards gives out more than 100 different awards in categories such as singers, groups, and songs. In 2007, the music label, Gold Label boycotted the ceremony due to rumours about their singers receiving only a few awards. The station has also presented the annual Metro Radio Mandarin Hits Music Awards (新城國語力頒獎禮), around July and August, since 2002.

=== Metro Plus (AM 1044) ===
Metro plus AM1044 provides international news coverage, current affairs, entertainment, music, health, cosmetic trends, jokes and conducts interviews with celebrities. The Indonesian Hour, Filipino Hour and Desi Dhamaka are international programs available in the Hong Kong area.

Metro Plus was awarded "Caring Company 2002/2003" by the Hong Kong Council of Social Service (HKCSS).

== Former channels ==
=== Metro Finance Digital (DAB+ 11) ===
Metro Finance Digital (MFD) focuses on Mainland China and the worldwide financial market, with educational programmes on investment. programmes from Metro Finance and Metro Info channels are repeated in MFD as well.

=== Metro Music Digital (DAB+ 12) ===
This channel mainly focuses on music including local, British, American, Japanese, Korean and Taiwanese pop music. The programming includes jazz, soul and R&D music, and musicians are invited to the music programmes as DJs. Metro Music Digital (MMD) channel now broadcasts on its own for 14 hours per day, then jointly broadcasts with Metro Finance and Metro Info channels for the remaining time. The slogan of MMD is "Love Music, Love Green."

=== Metro Life Digital (DAB+ 13) ===
Metro Life Digital (MLD) began broadcasting on 17 September 2014. Its programmes mainly focus on finance, lifestyle, science, history and religion. MLD broadcasts music programme from midnight to early morning.

== See also ==
- Media of Hong Kong
