= You're a Woman =

1985 single by Bad Boys Blue

Single by Bad Boys Blue

from the album Hot Girls, Bad Boys
- B-side: "You're a Woman (Instrumental)"
- Released: April 1985
- Genre: Eurodisco
- Length: 5:24 (album version); 3:57 (single version)
- Label: Coconut
- Songwriters: Tony Hendrik; Karin van Haaren; Mary Susan Applegate
- Producers: Tony Hendrik; Karin Hartmann

Bad Boys Blue singles chronology
"L.O.V.E. in My Car" (1984)	"You're a Woman" (1985)	"Pretty Young Girl" (1985)

"You're a Woman" is a song by Bad Boys Blue, released in April 1985 as the second single from their debut studio album, Hot Girls, Bad Boys (1985). It was a hit across Europe, reaching number 8 in West Germany, number 1 in Austria, number 2 in Switzerland and number 3 in Greece.

== Track listing and formats ==
- European 7-inch single

A. "You're a Woman" – 3:57
B. "You're a Woman" (Instrumental) – 4:40

- European 12-inch maxi-single

A. "You're a Woman" (Long Version) – 5:19
B. "You're a Woman" (Instrumental) – 3:49

== Charts ==
=== Weekly charts ===
Weekly chart performance for "You're a Woman"
Chart (1985)	Peak position
Austria (Ö3 Austria Top 40)	1
Belgium (Ultratop 50 Flanders)	4
Europe (European Top 100 Singles)	24
Finland (Suomen virallinen lista)	4
France (SNEP)	47
Greece (IFPI)	3
Netherlands (Dutch Top 40)	30
Netherlands (Single Top 100)	19
Sweden (Sverigetopplistan)	6
Switzerland (Schweizer Hitparade)	2
West Germany (GfK)	8

=== Year-end charts ===
Year-end chart performance for "You're a Woman"
Chart (1985)	Position
Belgium (Ultratop 50 Flanders)	33
Switzerland (Schweizer Hitparade)	9
West Germany (Official German Charts)	20

== Prudence Liew version ==
In 1987, the song was covered under the title "The Last Night (最後一夜)" with different lyrics in Cantonese and English and released as a single by Hong Kong pop singer Prudence Liew.

It was the second single from the album Prudence Liew. The track featured a heavy dance beat that proved to be very popular with the Hong Kong disco scene. The popularity of this song propelled Liew's status in the music scene and it is still considered to be her signature song.

=== Track listing and formats ===
- Hong Kong 12-inch single

A. "The Last Night (最後一夜)" (Rearranged Disco Version) – 6:47
B. "Neon Bird (霓虹鳥)" (Rearranged Disco Version) – 6:48

== You're a Woman '98 ==
"You're a Woman '98"

Single by Bad Boys Blue

from the album Back
- B-side: "You're a Woman (Rap Remix 1998)"
- Released: 2 June 1998
- Studio: Coconut (Hennef)
- Genre: Synth-pop
- Length: 3:48
- Label: Coconut
- Songwriters: Tony Hendrik; Karin van Haaren; Mary Susan Applegate
- Producers: Tony Hendrik; Karin Hartmann

Bad Boys Blue singles chronology
"Anywhere" (1996)	"You're a Woman '98" (1998)	"The Turbo Megamix" (1998)

Bad Boys Blue released a new version of the song under the title "You're a Woman '98" as a single in 1998. It was the lead single from their album Back. This re-release reached number 52 in Germany and number 4 in Finland.

=== Track listing and formats ===
- German CD maxi-single
1. "You're a Woman" (Original Remix 1998) – 3:48
2. "You're a Woman" (Rap Remix 1998) – 3:19
3. "Megamix Volume 1" – 8:17
4. "You're a Woman" (Extended Rap Remix 1998) – 5:11

=== Charts ===
Chart (1998)	Peak position
Finland (Suomen virallinen lista)	17
Germany (GfK)	52
