= Richard Lam =

Hong Kong songwriter (1948–2003)

- 林振強
- Born: 21 January 1948; Hong Kong
- Died: 16 November 2003 (aged 55); Queen Mary Hospital, Pok Fu Lam, Hong Kong
- Occupations: Lyricist, columnist
- Relatives: Eunice Lam (sister)

Chinese name
- Traditional Chinese: 林振強
- Simplified Chinese: 林振强
Transcriptions
Standard Mandarin
- Hanyu Pinyin: Lín Zhènqiáng
Yue: Cantonese
- Jyutping: lam4 zan3 koeng4
- Musical career
- Genre: Cantopop

Richard Lam Chun-keung (21 January 1948 – 16 November 2003) was a Cantopop lyricist with several hundred Cantopop songs to his name, and a columnist for Apple Daily and Next Magazine in Hong Kong.

Awards
Preceded by Jacky Cheung	Golden Pin Award of RTHK Top Ten Chinese Gold Songs Award; 2003	Succeeded by Liza Wang
