= Cinepoly Records =

Hong Kong-based record label

- Parent company: Universal Music Group
- Founded: 1985
- Distributor: Universal Music Hong Kong
- Genre: Various
- Country of origin: Hong Kong
- Location: Hong Kong
- Official website: Official website of Universal Music Hong Kong

Cinepoly Records (新藝寶) is a Hong Kong–based record label founded in 1985. It was a subsidiary of PolyGram Records and the film company Cinema City. Ownership of Cinepoly Records switched to Universal Music Group after Universal acquired PolyGram Records in 1998 and albums are distributed by Universal Music Hong Kong starting from 2017.

== Artistes ==
Many of Hong Kong's popstars and brands were on this label including:

- Joe Lee (1986–1987)
- Leslie Cheung (1987–1990)
- Beyond (1988–1991)
- Tai Chi (1985–1986, 1999–2001)
- Louis Lau (1990–1991)
- Brian Cheng (1991–1993)
- Pat Lew (1991–1994)
- William So (1993–2003)
- John Wu (1993–1994)
- Faye Wong (1989–1997)
- Softhard (1991–1996)
- Priscilla Chan (1998–2001)
- Julian Cheung (2000–2004)
- Miriam Yeung (2001–2003)
- Eason Chan (2004–2017)
- Kay Tse (2007–2012)
- Mr. (2008–2016)
- Prudence Liew (2008–2017)
- Swing (2009–2012)
- Kary Ng (2011–2017)
- Pong Nan (2014–2017)

== See also ==
- List of record labels
