= Prudence Liew =

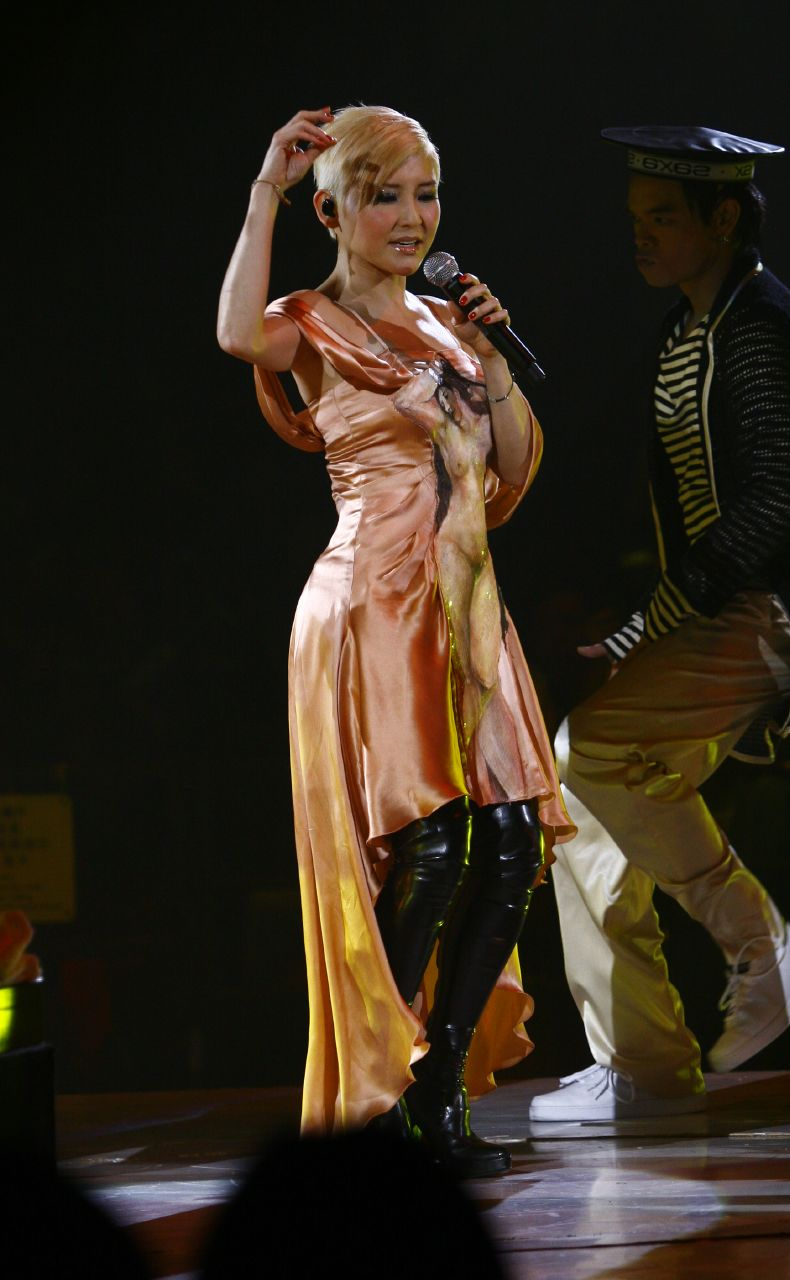
- Liew in 2008
- Born: 10 December 1964 (age 61); British Hong Kong
- Occupations: Singer; actor; tv presenter; film producer
- Years active: 1982–present
- Spouse(s): Taylor Wong (1982–1994); Kevin Yan (2002–2008)
- Children: 3
- Awards: Golden Horse Awards – Best Actress; 2008 True Women For Sale

Chinese name
- Traditional Chinese: 劉美君
- Simplified Chinese: 刘美君
Transcriptions
Standard Mandarin
- Hanyu Pinyin: Liú Měijūn
Yue: Cantonese
- Jyutping: Lau4 Mei5 Gwan1
- Musical career
- Origin: Hong Kong
- Genres: Pop
- Labels: Cinepoly Records (2008–present); Rock Records (2000); Columbia Records (1992–1995); BMG Music (1989–1992); Current Records (1986–1989)
- Website: prudenceliew.com

Prudence Liew Mei-Gwan (born 10 December 1964) is a Hong Kong pop singer and actress. A Golden Horse Award winner and platinum selling singer, she has released 16 studio albums and appeared in numerous films.

== Career ==
From the age of eight, she began appearing in television commercials after high school. In 1986, while working as a film producer, Liew was approached to sing the theme song for a movie. The song, Midnight Love was on heavy rotation at major Hong Kong radio stations and she was quickly signed as the flagship artist to Current Records. In December 1986, she released her self-titled début album to rave reviews and high sales. The album sold over 500,000 copies and was certified 10× platinum by the Hong Kong IFPI. Liew still holds the record in Hong Kong for the most albums sold by a débuting local artist for that album. It also won two awards as Album of the Year from RTHK Top 10 Gold Songs Awards and Jade Solid Gold Top 10 Awards in 1987. The second single from the album, "The Last Night", is a cover of the Bad Boys Blue song "You're a Woman", and is considered Liew's signature song.

In addition to music, Liew has also appeared in films and television dramas as an actress. In 1988, she was nominated for a Hong Kong Film Awards Best Supporting Actress award in the movie Law or Justice.

Between the period of 1986 and 1995, Liew has released 11 studio albums under Current Records, which was bought out by BMG Music in 1989 and later Columbia Records from 1992 to 1995.

== Hiatus ==
In 1995, Liew decided to leave the Hong Kong music industry after the divorce from her director husband, Tai-Loi Wong (with whom she had a son and a daughter) and due to having problems with her vocal cords. She then relocated to the US city of San Francisco with her children to find peace. During her time in the US, Liew found a love for yoga, which she practices regularly. She also met her second husband, whose name she will only disclose to the media as "Mr. Yan" for privacy reasons, while in San Francisco. Together they have a daughter. In an interview in September 2008, Liew announced that she has separated from Mr. Yan.

== Love Yourself ==
In 2000, with help from her longtime friend and fellow singer, Sandy Lam, Liew landed a record deal with Taiwan-based record company, Rock Records and released her first mandopop studio album entitled Love Yourself. However, she returned to the US quickly after the first single, Everytime, I Take it Very Seriously was released, thus no other singles, nor follow-up albums were released afterwards in Taiwan. In the same year, Liew also appeared in the ATV series Anything But Him, co-starring Amy Chan and Tien Niu.

== Return to Hong Kong ==
In April 2008, Liew held a 2-night performance called Opening the Sexual Boundaries Concert at the Hong Kong Coliseum. Also, a compilation greatest hits album was released to accompany the concert. And after a 20-year hiatus from motion pictures, she took the lead part to the movie, True Women For Sale, directed by Herman Yau. The film was the opener for the 2008 Hong Kong Asian Film Festival and her role as a drug-addicted prostitute won Liew the award for Best Leading Actress at the 2008 Golden Horse Awards, as well as a Best Actress nomination at the 28th Hong Kong Film Awards. Liew was a student of Eleonor England, a San Francisco-based vocal coach.

In 2009, Liew was announced as the host for season 1 of the TVB program, The Voice, a reality-show type singing competition. On 22 October 2009, Liew released her first Cantonese studio album in 15 years, titled The Queen of Hardships.

On 30 December 2009, it was announced that TVB was relieving Liew of her hosting duties from The Voice, three episodes shy of the season finale due to the controversy between TVB and the HKRIA over song royalties. Liew, who is currently signed to Cinepoly Records under the Universal Music label governed by the HKRIA, was part of the group of Hong Kong singers all signed to HKRIA record labels that were banned from appearing on all TVB programming until the issue was resolved late 2011. In 2010, Liew spent most of the year in the United States.

In 2011, Liew returned to Hong Kong and released her second mandopop album, the cover album Love Addict in June. The album topped the charts for two weeks straight on Hong Kong HMV's Asian Album Chart upon its release. In November, she was invited to be a regular judge on season 4 of the Asia Television talent program, Asian Millionstar.

In 2012, Liew released another cover album, albeit in Cantonese this time, entitled Stolen Moments in July. She announced that a third cover album, in English, would be recorded and released in the future. The album, Reincarnated Love was eventually released in July 2017.

In 2013, Liew signed with Hong Kong Television Network, a new television station in Hong Kong, and filmed the drama series, To Be or Not to Be, formerly titled Hakka Women, in which she spoke her native Hakka dialect. She also recorded the theme song for the drama, "Two Cups of Tea". The 25-episode series was aired from December 2014 to January 2015.

== Filmography ==
=== Motion pictures ===
Year	Title	Role	Awards
1983	毀滅號地車 On the Wrong Track	Sze	
1986	猛鬼學堂 The Haunted Cop Shop II	Miss Spiritual	
1988	法中情 Law or Justice	Ling Shan-shan	Nominated – Hong Kong Film Award for Best Supporting Actress
1990	A Tale from the East		
2008	我不賣身．我賣子宮 True Women For Sale	Lai Chung-chung	Golden Horse Award for Best Actress; Ming Pao Weekly Magazine Award for Outstanding Actress; Nominated – Hong Kong Film Award for Best Actress; Nominated – Hong Kong Film Critics Society Awards for Best Actress
2010	72家租客 72 Tenants of Prosperity	Hung	
2012	起勢搖滾 Lives in Flames	Alex's mother	
2015	王家欣 Wong Ka Yan	Chan Wai-yin	
2017	黃金花 Tomorrow is Another Day	Mrs. Chan	

=== Television (as actress) ===
- 1989 奪命情人 The Killing Lover ( TVB TV movie co-starring Leon Lai )
- 1992 我為錢狂 Source of Evil ( TVB series co-starring Anita Yuen )
- 2000 妳想的愛 Anything But Him ( ATV series co-starring Amy Chan )
- 2014–2015 來生不做香港人 To Be or Not to Be (HKTV series co-starring Maggie Cheung Ho-Yee)
- 2019 Sorina Fok

=== Television (as presenter) ===
- 2009–2010 超級巨聲 The Voice – Season 1 (TVB)
- 2011 亞洲星光大道 Asian Millionstar – Season 4 Regular Judge (ATV)
- 2018 Good Night Show - King Maker – Vocal trainer (ViuTV)

== Awards and nominations ==
Year	Award	Category	For	Result	Notes
1987	RTHK Top 10 Gold Songs Awards	Most Promising Newcomer Award		Won	Gold Award
1987	RTHK Top 10 Gold Songs Awards	Album of the Year	Prudence Liew	Won	Producer: Joseph Chan
1987	Jade Solid Gold Top 10 Awards	Album of the Year	Prudence Liew	Won	Producer: Joseph Chan
1988	Hong Kong Film Awards	Best Supporting Actress	Law or Justice	Nominated	
2008	CASH Golden Sail Music Awards	Best Female Vocal Performance	"浮花 (Floating Flower)" from Opening the Sexual Boundaries	Nominated	
2008	Golden Horse Awards	Best Actress	True Women For Sale	Won	
2008	Hong Kong Film Critics Society Awards	Best Actress	True Women For Sale	Nominated	
2009	Hong Kong Film Awards	Best Actress	True Women For Sale	Nominated	
2009	Ming Pao Weekly Magazine Awards	Most Outstanding Actress	True Women For Sale	Won	tied with Karena Lam for Claustrophobia
2009	Chinese Music Awards (華語金曲獎)	Top 10 Albums of the Year – Cantonese	The Queen of Hardships	Won	5th place
2010	Chinese Music Awards (華語金曲獎)	Best Female Singer – Cantonese	The Queen of Hardships	Nominated	

Awards and achievements
Golden Horse Award
Preceded by Joan Chen for The Home Song Stories	Best Actress; 2008 for True Women For Sale	Succeeded by Li Bingbing for The Message
