= Xiamen University =

Public university in Xiamen, Fujian, China

Coordinates: 24.438259°N 118.093153°E

- 厦门大学
- Seal of the University since 1921
- Former name: Amoy University
- Motto: 自强不息，止于至善; Chū-kiông put-sek, chí u chì-siān
- Motto in English: Pursue Excellence, Strive for Perfection
- Type: Public university
- Established: 6 April 1921; 105 years ago
- Affiliations: Project 985; Project 211; Double First-Class Construction; GU8
- President: Hu Wenping
- Faculty: 4,600+
- Students: 28,133
- Undergraduates: 20,277
- Postgraduates: 16,562
- Doctoral students: 4,297
- Location: Xiamen, Fujian, China
- Campus: urban, 524.3 ha
- Website: xmu.edu.cn en.xmu.edu.cn
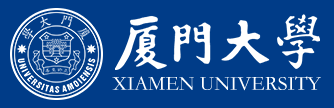

Chinese name
- Simplified Chinese: 厦门大学
- Traditional Chinese: 廈門大學
Transcriptions
Standard Mandarin
- Hanyu Pinyin: Xiàmén Dàxué
Southern Min
- Hokkien POJ: Ē-mn̂g Toā-o̍h

Xiamen University (XMU; 厦门大学) is a public university in Siming, Xiamen, Fujian, China. It is affiliated with the Ministry of Education of China. The university is part of Project 211, Project 985, and the Double First-Class Construction.

Founded in 1921 by Tan Kah Kee, a Chinese patriotic expatriate businessman in Singapore, the university has been perennially regarded as one of the top academic institutions in Southern China, with strengths in mathematics, chemistry, oceanography, economics, management, law, communication and political science.

As of April 2023, over 45,000 students are enrolled at Xiamen University, including more than 21,000 undergraduates, over 19,000 master's students, and over 5,000 doctoral candidates.

Xiamen University is proactive in international exchanges and collaboration. It has forged partnerships with 263 universities abroad and engages in substantial exchanges with 53 institutions. In July 2014, the groundwork for the Xiamen University Malaysia campus was initiated, marking it as the first Chinese university to pioneer an independent campus overseas.

== History ==
=== Private period ===
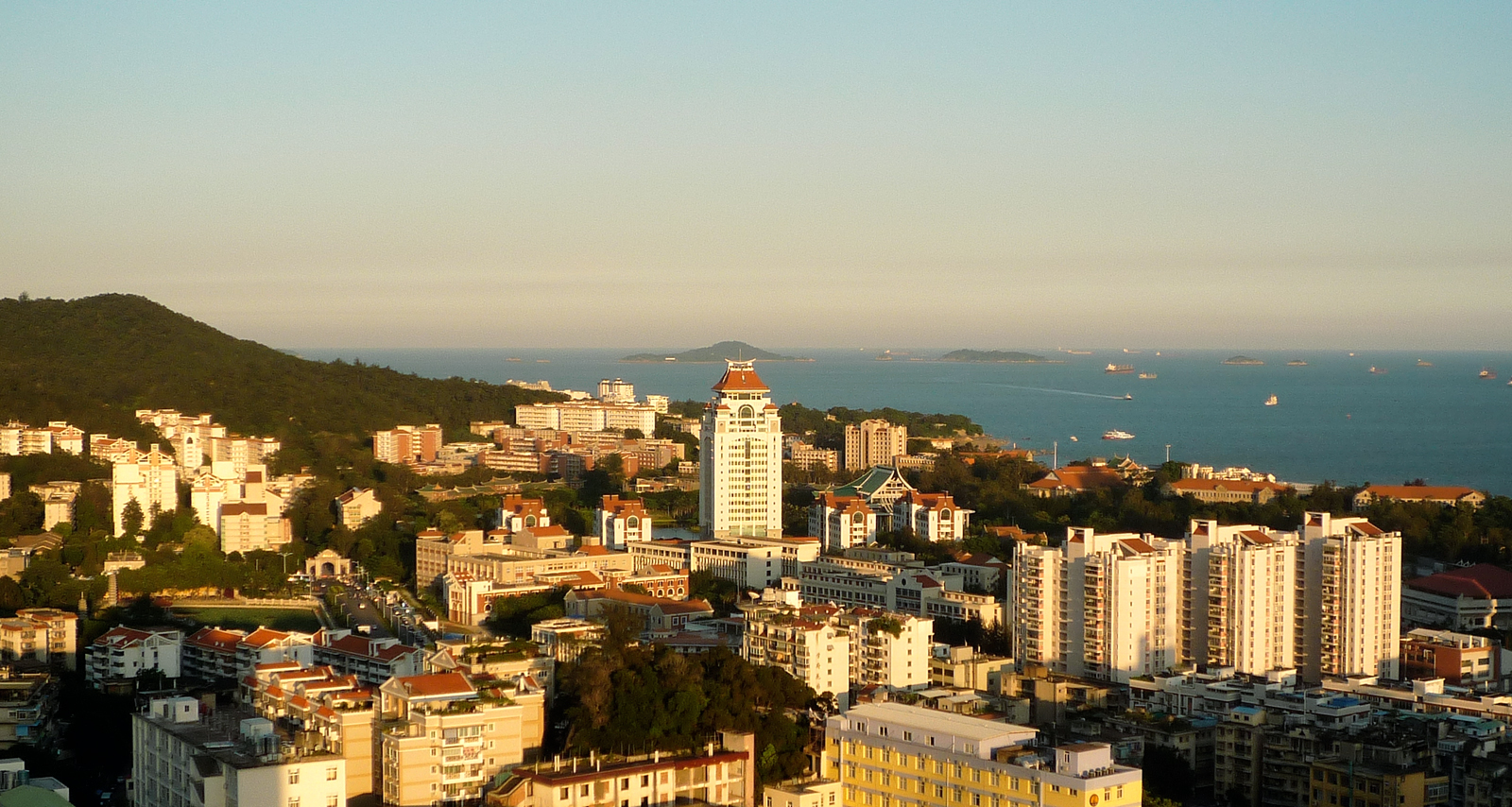
Panoramic view of Xiamen University, with new campus in the foreground and the original campus near the beach

In 1919, Tan Kah Kee, a Chinese expatriate in Singapore, businessman, investor, and philanthropist, donated then 4 million dollars to endow Amoy University in the city of Amoy (former romanization of 'Xiamen' until the 1970s). When the university was founded in 1921, there were no more than 20 faculty members and just 98 students.

At the 1926 Sesquicentennial International Exposition in Philadelphia, United States, Amoy University was one of five institutions selected to participate in an exhibit on education in China, representing the country's higher education system.

=== National university period ===
In 1937, Tan transferred administration of the university to the Nationalist government, and the institution became a national university.

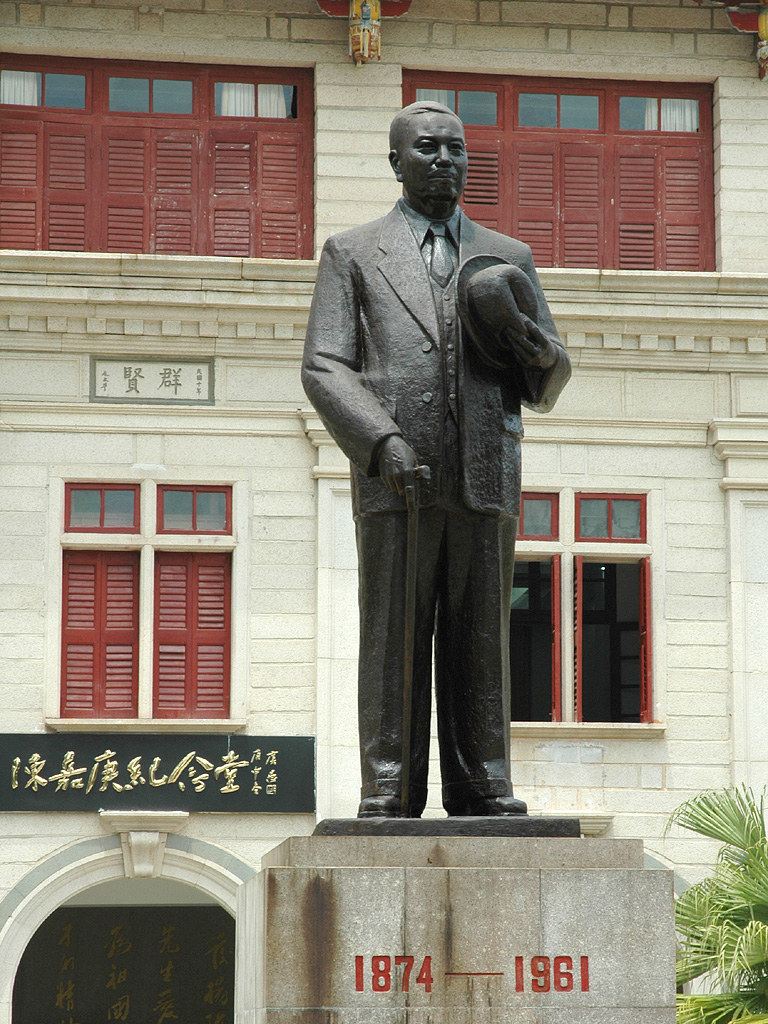
Statue of Tan Kah Kee, in front of his memorial hall located in Xiamen University main campus .

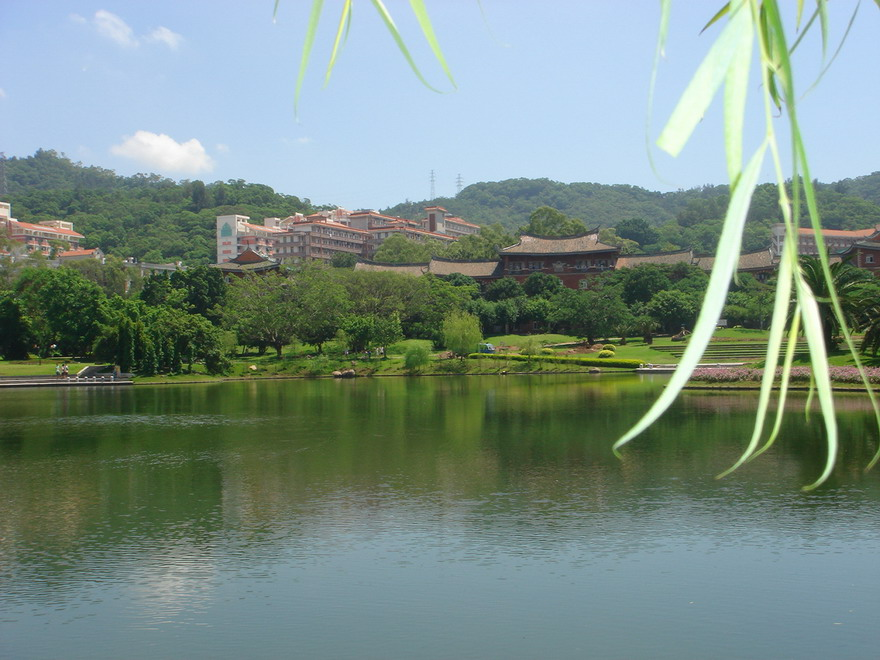
Furong Lake

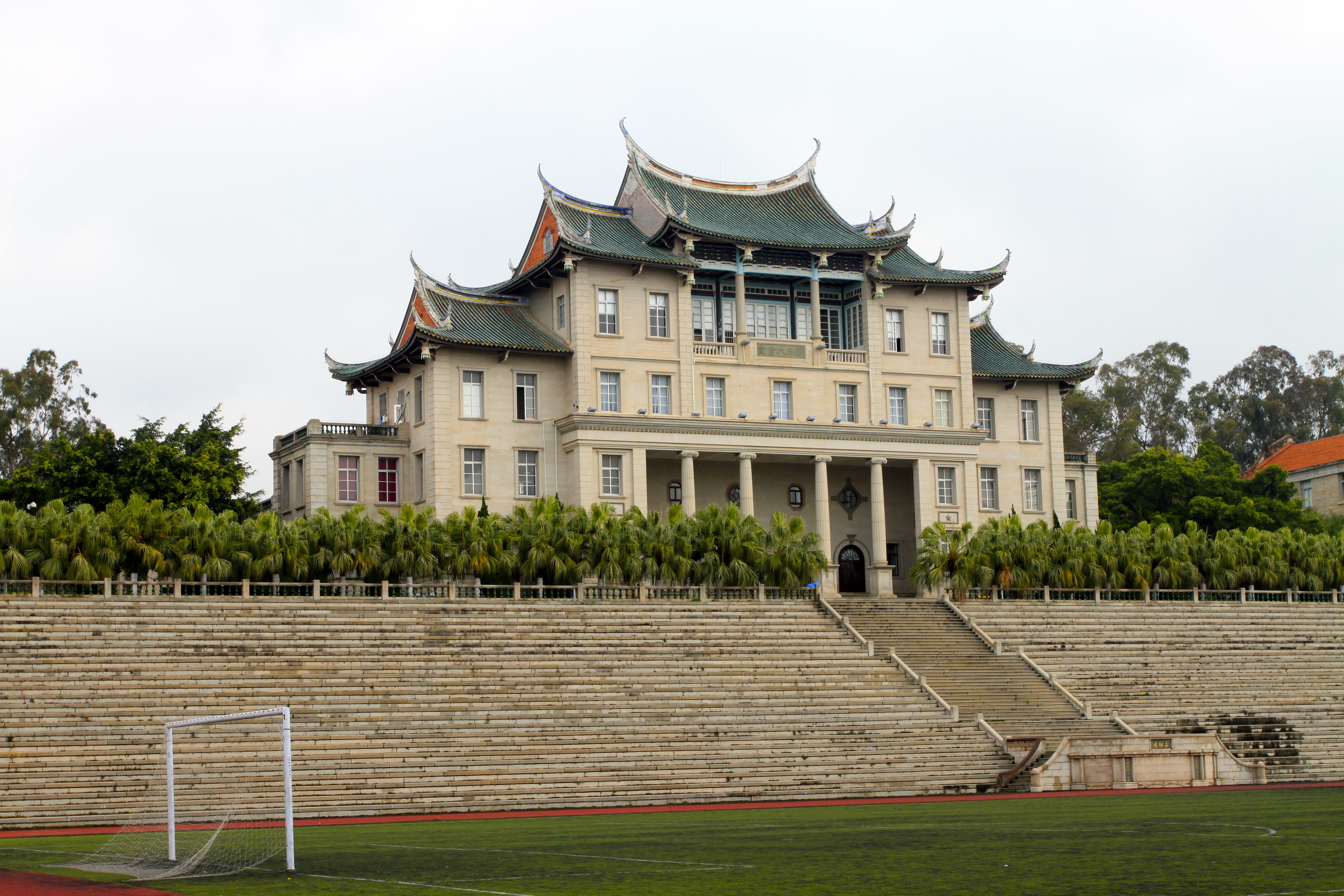
Jiannan Auditorium

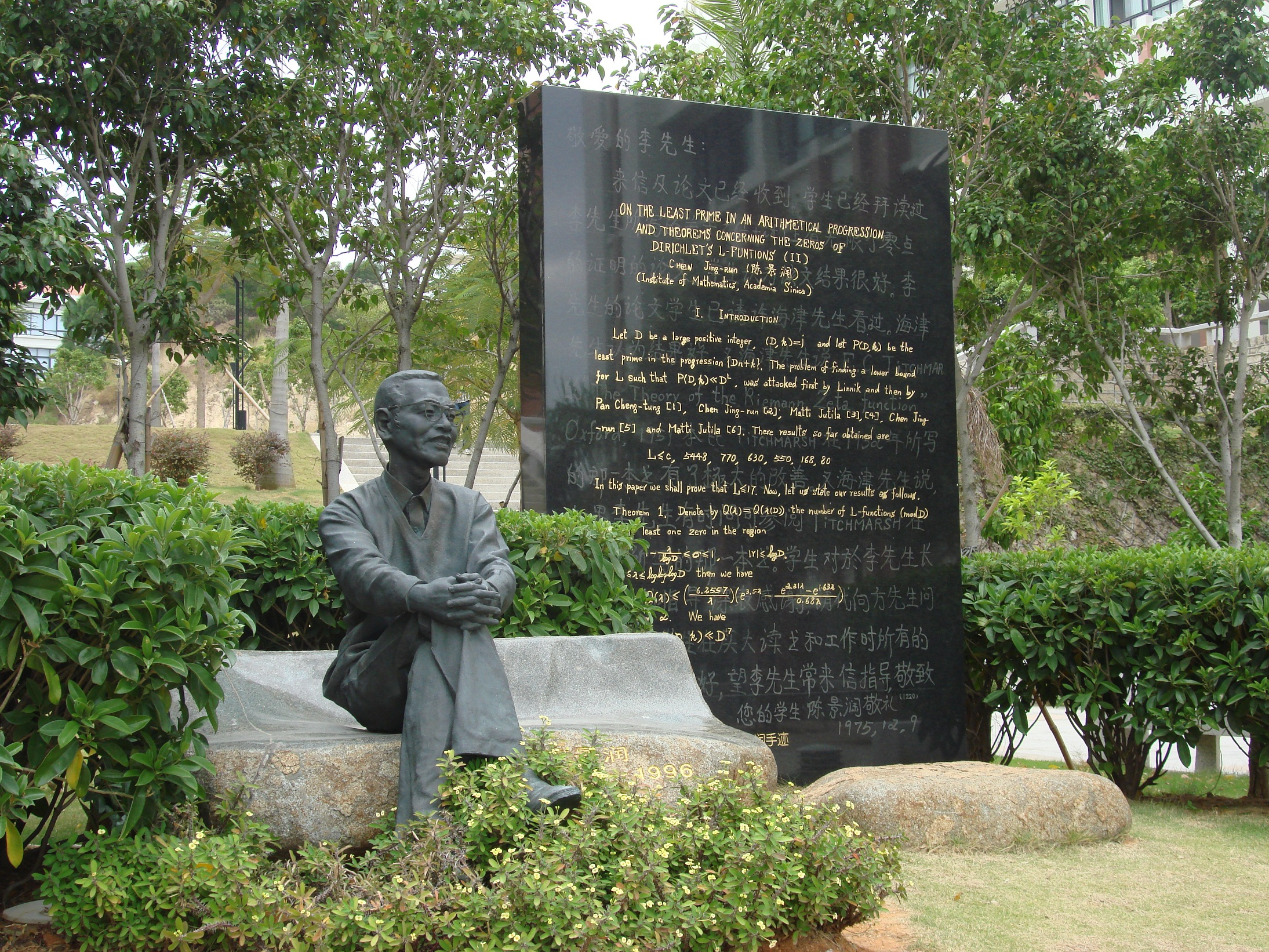
Statue of notable mathematician Chen Jingrun (陈景润)

In 1938, following the Amoy Operation during the Second Sino-Japanese War, the university was temporarily relocated to Changting in western Fujian to escape Japanese invasion of Chinese coastal regions.

In 1946, after the war, the university moved back to Xiamen and resumed normal operations.

In 1952, it was transformed into a comprehensive university embracing both arts and science.

In 1963, it was designated as a key university in China.

In 1995, Xiamen University was selected to participate in Project 211, a Chinese government initiative to provide increased financial resources for the country's most promising universities.

In 2000, the university was selected for 985 Project, a national and local government initiative to provide funding for facilities construction and faculty hiring to bolster China's top universities.

On January 25, 2013, the Ministry of Higher Education of Malaysia submitted an invitation letter to Xiamen University to establish a branch campus in Malaysia.

On July 3, 2014, the foundation of Xiamen University Malaysia Campus was laid near Kuala Lumpur.

On February 22, 2016, Malaysia Campus officially opened.

In September 2017, the university was recognized as a Class A institution in the Double First Class University Plan, a Chinese government initiative to cultivate a group of elite Chinese universities into "world-class" institutions by 2050.

== International cooperation ==
Xiamen University has maintained a global presence since its creation in 1921, attracting students from overseas Chinese communities in Southeast Asia. The institution established an "Overseas Correspondence Courses" program in 1956 and accepted its first foreign students in 1981. Xiamen University now has an extensive portfolio of international collaborations, including an International Cooperative Program for Innovative Talents funded by the China Scholarship Council, and global exchange and cooperation relationships with over 300 universities. It has established 16 Confucius Institutes with partner institutions in 13 countries.

In 2011, Chinese government and Malaysian government began high-level discussions about creating a Malaysian branch of Xiamen University. Subsequently, in 2015 the Xiamen University Malaysia Campus was established. Known as "XMU Malaysia," the institution has been described as "historic" and is notable as the "first ever large-scale international branch" of a Chinese university. Professor Wang Ruifang was named the first chancellor of XMU Malaysia.

On May 23, 2016, Xiamen University sent a delegation to the Tokyo Institute of Technology in Tokyo, Japan to meet with leadership and professors. The delegation's objective was to discuss the institutions' strategies for commercializing research findings, fostering university-industry collaboration, and encouraging international students to learn about local language and culture.

On November 18, 2016, Xiamen University and Cardiff University in Wales, United Kingdom initiated a "strategic partnership" including a program for co-supervision of doctoral students, and £1.2 million in seed funding for "collaborative research projects" to benefit the economy of Wales. Subsequently, a delegation from Cardiff University visited the Xiamen University School of International Relations to explore possible areas of research collaboration and student exchange.

Xiamen University also hosts recurring China study programs for University of North Carolina at Chapel Hill, Council for Christian Colleges and Universities, Eckerd College and Bentley College in USA, and University College Utrecht in the Netherlands.

In cooperation with Mae Fah Luang University in Thailand, Xiamen University operates a Confucius Institute at Mae Fah Luang University's Sirindhorn Chinese Language and Culture Center.

== Campuses ==
=== Main campus (Siming campus) ===
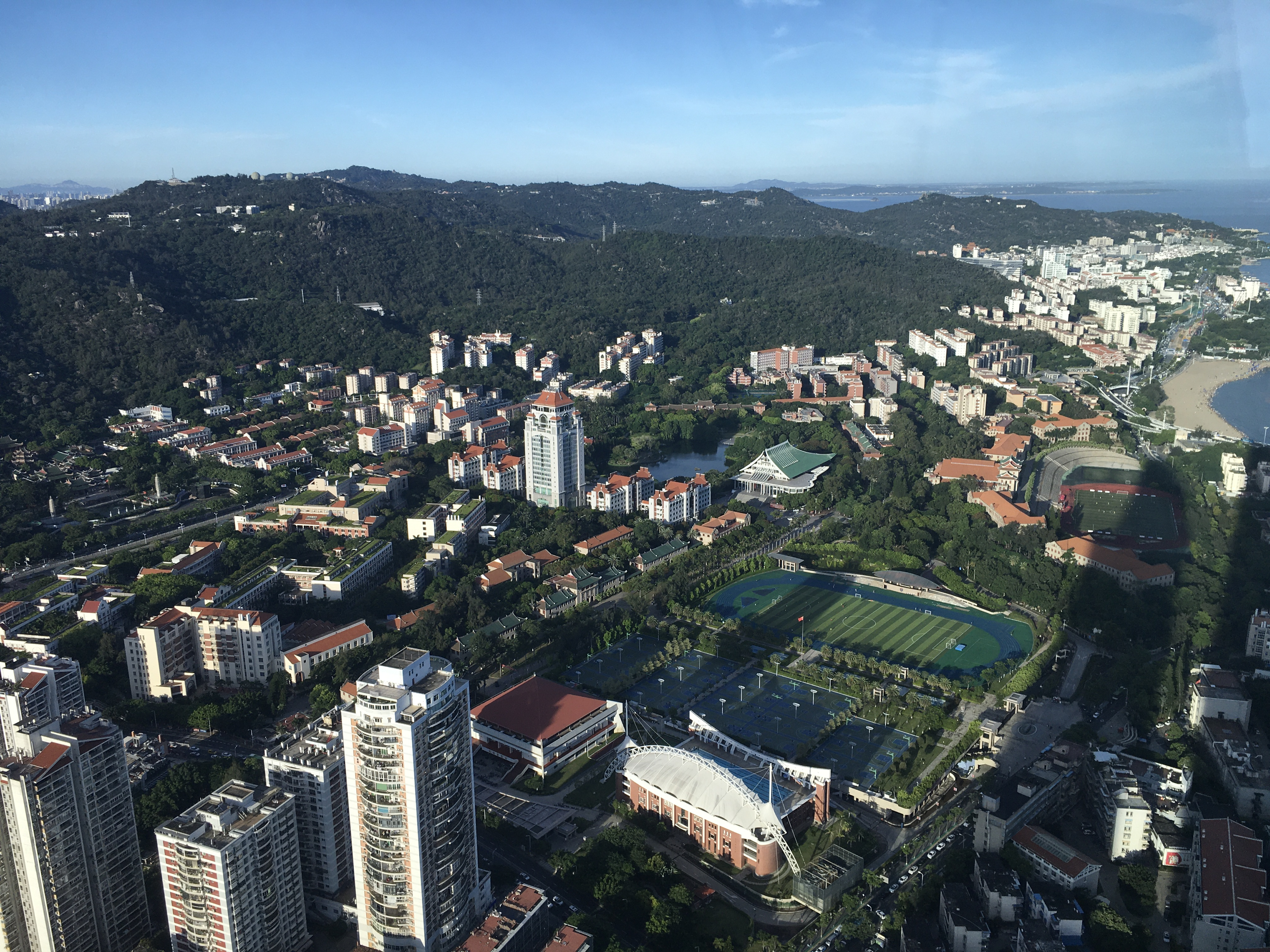
Main campus

The main campus of XMU is located in Siming District on Xiamen island, covering an area of 167 hectares. It is situated at the foothills of mountains, facing the ocean and surrounded by Xiamen bay. It mainly houses such academic divisions as the Humanities and Arts, Social Sciences, Natural Sciences, and Engineering and Technology.

The scope and level of its campus high-speed information network is rated first among all universities in China and has become one of the main nodes of CERNET2.

==== Haiyun campus ====
The Haiyun Campus is part of the main campus, located near the Pearl Bay, south end of Xiamen, adjacent to Xiamen Software Park. The School of Software, School of Information Science and Technology, School of Mathematics Science are located in the campus.

=== Zhangzhou campus ===
Zhangzhou Campus is located in Zhangzhou China Merchants Economic and Technological Development Zone (CMZD), Zhangzhou, covering an area of 171 hectares, with architecture consistent with the main campus. In July 2012, most facilities were allocated to XMU Tan Kah Kee College. In September 2020, the new Xiamen University College of Creativity and Innovation moved to the campus, and part of the International College relocated back. The campus now hosts the College of Creativity and Innovation, International College, Gulei Petrochemical Research Institute, Institute of Industrial Technology, and XMU Tan Kah Kee College. It aims to be a hub for international cooperation, applied talent cultivation, result transformation, and talent gathering. In addition, the college actively organizes students to innovate and start businesses.

=== Xiang'an campus ===
In September 2012, Xiamen University began operations at its Xiang'an Campus, located 34 kilometers from the main campus. The three stated goals of the new campus are to provide facilities for "newly developing disciplines and applied subjects" such as bioscience and energy, to establish "innovation platforms for applied sciences," and to house the southern headquarters of the Confucius Institute.

Currently, the Xiang'an Campus hosts over 10,000 students and faculty from ten schools: the Overseas Education College (which serves international students), the Medical College, the School of Pharmaceutical Sciences, the School of Life Sciences, the School of Public Health, the Nursing Department, the College of Earth Sciences, the College of Environment and Ecology, the School of Energy Research, and the School of Aerospace Engineering.

=== Malaysia campus (XMUM) ===
Upon the invitation of the Malaysian Ministry of Higher Education to set up a branch campus in Malaysia, Xiamen University accepted the offer and thus, Xiamen University Malaysia (XMUM) was born in 2015.

In keeping with the vision of the founder Mr. Tan Kah Kee, XMU built its first offshore campus in Malaysia and became the first university from China to establish a branch campus in Malaysia.

The campus is located in Bandar Serenia, Sepang, Selangor Darul Ehsan. It is a 10-minute drive from the Kuala Lumpur International Airport, and a 15-minute drive from Putrajaya, the administrative center of the government of Malaysia.

== Reputation and rankings ==
University rankings
BCUR National	Domestic	24
Wu Shulian National	Domestic	26
CUAA National	Alumni	20
QS National	General	19
THE National	General	19
QS Asia (Asia version)	General	76
THE Asia (Asia version)	General	67
ARWU World	Research	101–150
QS World	General	303
THE World	General	=224
USNWR World	General	176

Xiamen University has been consistently regarded as one of the top academic institutions in Southern China, with strengths in economics and management, fine arts, law, chemistry, journalism, communication, mathematics and political science.

Among global university rankings, Xiamen University is ranked 341st by the 2026 QS World University Rankings, 251-300th by the 2026 world university rankings of the Times Higher Education, 189th by the 2025 U.S. News & World Report Best Global Universities Rankings and 101-150th worldwide by the 2025 Academic Ranking of World Universities.

== Faculties and research institutes ==
As of 1 September 2017, Xiamen University consisted of 20 schools with 44 departments, along with many key research institutes.

- School of Humanities
- School of Foreign Languages and Cultures
- School of Journalism and Communication
- School of Law
- Tan Kah Kee College
- Xiamen Academy of International Law
- School of Public Affairs
- School of Economics
- Wang Yanan Institute for Studies in Economics
- School of Management
- College of Art
- College of Chemistry and Chemical Engineering
- School of Physics and Mechanical and Electrical Engineering
- College of Oceanography and Environment
- School of Life Science
- School of Information Science and Technology
- School of Electronic Science &Technology
- School of Mathematics
- Software School
- Medical College
- School of Architecture and Civil Engineering
- Overseas Education College
- Adult Education College
- Professional Technical College
- Internet Education College
- School of Pharmaceutical Sciences

== Notable alumni ==
- Gregory Chow – economist
- Chen Jingrun – mathematician
- Lin Yutang – Chinese writer and inventor
- Yu Guangzhong – Taiwanese writer, poet, educator, and critic
- Xie Xide – president of Fudan University from 1983 to 1989
- Lu Xun – writer
- Raymond Lam – Hong Kong artiste and singer (enrolled for one year, 1996)
- Faye Wong – singer
- Wong Ker-lee – Fujianese Hong Kong businessman and politician
- Zhang Gaoli – former Vice Premier of the State Council of the People's Republic of China
- Li Wo-shi – magistrate of Kinmen County
- Bei Cun - avant-garde Christian novelist.
- Tsai Chih-chan - poet and painter

== See also ==
- Xiamen University Malaysia
- List of universities in China
- Xiamen University School of Medicine
