= Looking Back in Anger =

Hong Kong television drama series

- Promo poster
- Also known as: Nghĩa Bất Dung Tình 义不容情 義不容情 คู่แค้นสายโลหิต
- 義不容情
- Created by: Wai Ka-Fai
- Directed by: Lee Kwok Lap; Yuen Ying Ming
- Starring: Felix Wong; Deric Wan; Carina Lau; Kathy Chow; Maggie Shiu; Elliot Ngok; Kwai Hoi-san; Henry Lee; Carrie Ho; Spencer Leung; Yammie Nam; Gregory Lee; Soh Hang-suen
- Theme music composer: Danny Chan; Dave Wong Kit
- Opening theme: Yat sang ho kau (一生何求); Bits of Sadness, Bits of Craze (幾分傷心幾分痴)
- Country of origin: Hong Kong
- Original language: Cantonese
- No. of episodes: 50

Production
- Production locations: Hong Kong, Macau, Malaysia, China
- Running time: 42 minutes (each)

Original release
- Network: TVB Jade
- Release: 3 April – 9 June 1989

Looking Back in Anger (Chinese: 義不容情; lit. 'righteousness doesn’t permit feelings') was a 1989 Hong Kong TV series and one of the most watched TVB series by Chinese people in Hong Kong, Southeast Asia and around the world. Many factors contributed to the success of this series. In addition to its tragic but memorable storyline, the series featured a strong cast, with Felix Wong, Deric Wan (who rose to fame with his role as the main antagonist), Carina Lau, Kathy Chow and Maggie Shiu. The popular theme song of the series "Yat sang ho kau" (一生何求) was sung by Danny Chan and later by Deric Wan himself.

In 2022, the drama was selected as one of ten classic TVB dramas being honoured for a new joint Youku and TVB programme.

== Cast ==
- Felix Wong as Alex Ting Yau Kin and Ting Wing Cheung, Kin and Hong's father
- Deric Wan as Ben Ting Yau Hong, Kin's brother and the series’ main antagonist
- Yammie Lam as Mui Fan Fong, Kin and Hong's mother
- Soh Hang-suen as Aunt Wan (Yip Sau Wan), Cheun's wife and the adoptive mother of Kin and Hong
- Maggie Shiu as Chiu Kar Mun, Hong's girlfriend and later fiancée
- Kathy Chow as Connie Lee Wah, Kin's first girlfriend
- Carina Lau as Sandy Ngai Chor Gwun, Kin's friend, later girlfriend and then wife
- Kwan Hoi-san as Ngai Kwan, Gwun's father, a business tycoon and Fong Sai Bong's business rival
- Lee Shing-cheung as Michael Fung Yiu Kwok, Bong's elder son
- Cheng Gwun-meen as Martin Chu Siu Shan
- Elliot Ngok as Henry Fung Sai Bong, father of Michael, Sam and Cindy
- Felix Lok as Mr. Szeto
- Bowie Wu as Lee Ho Cheun, Wan's husband
- Ng Kai Ming as Sam Fung Yiu Ming, Bong's younger son
- Gregory Lee as young Ting Yau Kin (in the 1960s)
- Kong Ngai as Lee Lap, Wah's father
- Spencer Leung as Chow Zhi Mun
- Carrie Ho as Chan Siu Ling
- Frankie Lam as Rich classmate 1
- Mak Cheung-ching as Rich classmate 2
- Gilbert Lam as Mr Yeung
- Michael Tao as Herman
- Gallen Lo as Wong Kwok-Kei
- Kiki Sheung as Cindy Fung Mei Yan, Bong's daughter and later Hong's wife
- Lily Li as Miss Lam, Magazine Editor-in-Chief, Ngai Chor Gwun's former boss
- Steve Lee as Toh Kum Siu
- Lau Sek-Ming as Francis Ngai Chun Kit, Gwan's half-brother with whom she was very close to
- Galen Yu as Yau Kwok Cheung
- Cheng Kun Sin
- Chan Lei Si as Fong Hung
- Chu Sing Choi

== Plot ==
The series starts with tycoon Alex Ting Yau Kin (Felix Wong) waiting for a phone call. His entire story is then told in flashback.

=== 1960s ===
Kin (Gregory Lee) was born into a poor family. Kin's father, Ting Wing Cheung (also played by Felix Wong) is a gambling addict.

Kin's mother, Mui Fan Fong (Yammie Nam), is wrongfully accused of murder and sentenced to death. Cheung goes insane after his wife's death.

Lee Ho Cheun (Bowie Wu) and his wife, Yip Sau Wan (So Hang Suen) adopts Kin and his baby brother, Hong.

Cheun suffers a fatal stroke soon after, leaving a financially destitute Wan to bring up Kin, Hong and two other adopted children, Mun and Ling.

=== 1980s ===
Kin (Felix Wong) works multiple jobs to help Wan support the family. Wan takes in her brother-in-law's daughter, Lee Wah (Kathy Chow).

Hong (Deric Wan) drops out of university to work for Fong Sai Bong (Elliot Ngok), the prosecutor of their mother's case, resulting in a falling out with Kin. Kin starts a relationship with Wah and befriends heiress Ngai Chor Gwan (Carina Lau).

Hong becomes increasingly ruthless in his pursuit of wealth and power. He manipulates Kin into taking the rap for him after causing the death of Gwan's brother, Kit (Canti Lau), over a business dispute. Hong later murders his own girlfriend Chiu Kar Mun (Maggie Shiu) in Malaysia so that he could marry Bong's daughter, Cindy (Kiki Sheung).

Upon his release from prison, Kin starts a successful restaurant chain. He faces setback in his personal life after breaking up with Wah due to her insecurity. Gwan is there to offer him solace and they become a couple. Wah is paralyzed in a plane crash and commits suicide on the night of Kin and Gwan's wedding.

Wan finds evidence of Kar Mun's murder, forcing Hong to kill her. Hong manages to avoid extradition to Malaysia due to a legal technicality. Cindy files for divorce and Hong loses his position in Bong's company. However, Cindy dies before the divorce is finalized, allowing Hong to inherit her wealth.

Hong suffers major financial losses and becomes a fugitive after kidnapping his own son for ransom. During a fight with Kin, Hong fell down an elevator shaft and became crippled. He was eventually imprisoned for the kidnapping.

=== 1990s ===
Kin spots an impoverished Hong on the streets, and gives him a lowly job at his restaurant.

The ungrateful Hong attempts to inherit Kin's wealth as surviving next of kin by poisoning Kin and his family during a company dinner. Kin and Gwan survived, but their son did not. Kin deduces that Hong is the culprit.

Kin sets a trap for Hong and have him arrested in Malaysia. Hong is sentenced to death.

Gwan separates from Kin and leaves for Ethiopia. Kin says he will wait for her at the church where they got married exactly ten years to the day.

Before the ten-year deadline, Kin appears on a retrospective of the TV show where he first met Gwan. Kin makes an impassioned plea for Gwan to return.

=== Present ===
The story comes out of flashback to the present.

Gwan calls to tell Kin she is coming home. While rushing to the airport, Kin gets into a car crash. Later, news reports indicate that Ethiopia has suffered a massive earthquake and Gwan is amongst the missing. Kin clings to the hope that Gwan will return on the ten-year deadline.

On the appointed day, Kin heads to the church and waits for Gwan. After midnight, a disappointed Kin falls asleep on a pew. A lady in red, visible only from the waist down appears. She approaches the sleeping Kin and leaves him a note.

Kin wakes up and finds the note which implores him to forget Gwan and move on. Kin desperately calls out Gwan's name.

=== Ending ===
There were many speculations as to the identity of the lady in red, from Kin's sister to Gwan herself, and even her dead spirit.

25 years after the series finale aired, lead actor Felix Wong confirmed that the lady in red was Kin's adopted sister Ling, and that Gwan had already died in Ethiopia.

== Filming ==
Principal filming occurred in Hong Kong with some scenes set in Macau. Extensive filming also took place in Malaysia; notable locations filmed include Kuala Lumpur railway station, Chin Swee Caves Temple, Genting Highlands, and Christ Church Malacca.

== Notes ==
1. A passing reference to the murder of Vincent Chin is made as having occurred months ago in the US.
