= Zhang Yichun =

Chinese financial economist

Zhang Yichun (Chinese: 张亦春; born 1932) is a Chinese financial economist and the first winner of Lifetime Achievement Award of China Financial Discipline (中国金融学科终身成就奖). He currently serves as Dean of the Institute of Finance at Xiamen University.

His research areas includes stock market, money theory and commercial banking. Although in his 80s, Zhang is still active in academia and has given a number of talks and lectures on FinTech.

Zhang's popular college-level textbook Financial Markets (金融市场学) is highly influential among Chinese finance students.
