= Chinese Government Award for Outstanding Self-Financed Students Abroad =

Chinese government award

The Chinese Government Award for Outstanding Self-financed Students Abroad (国家优秀自费留学生奖学金) is the highest government award granted by the Chinese government to Chinese doctoral students who study overseas as well as postdoctoral researchers who conduct research and have received doctorates overseas. It was established in 2003 by the China Scholarship Council under the Ministry of Education of the People's Republic of China.

The number of Chinese students studying abroad is more than half a million each year, the Academic Committee only considers doctoral students with outstanding academic achievements or great research potential during overseas study, and every year globally selects 650 young talents from different disciplines (500 before 2021), thus making this award highly competitive.

To date, the recipients include Chinese students studying in the United States, EU countries, Canada, Singapore, Switzerland, Norway, Japan, Australia, etc. The awarding ceremony is held each year at the local Chinese Embassy or Consulate, the attendees usually include the Ambassador or General Counselor, Education Counselor, awardees and their supervisors, invited international guests, journalists, etc.

 The “self-financed students abroad” here refer to those students who do not use direct funding from the Chinese government, past winners are almost from overseas universities' doctoral students with full scholarships.

== History ==
=== Before 2021 ===
Each year, the award recognizes 500 outstanding students. Of these, no more than 10 extraordinary prizes are awarded to the top achievers, who receive a cash award of $10,000. The remaining awardees receive a cash prize of $6,000, and all recipients receive a certificate of recognition.

=== Reform since 2021 ===
Starting from 2021, the award opens up two groups to call for application, group A and B.

Recipients of Group A will be selected from self-financed Chinese students who are still pursuing their degrees, with a maximum of 600 awardees each year. Among them, up to 20 extraordinary prizes will be awarded to top achievers, with a cash prize of $10,000, while the remaining awardees will receive $6,000 and a certificate.

Recipients of Group B will be selected from self-financed Chinese students who have already obtained their degrees and are planning to return to China for work, including fresh graduates and postdoctoral researchers. To be eligible, applicants must provide a signed working contract with a domestic host, in addition to other required documents such as diplomas, publication records, and recommendation letters. There will be 50 recipients selected each year, and each recipient will receive a $10,000 cash prize and a certificate.

== Eligibility ==
- Applicants must be of P.R. China nationality, including citizenship of the Special Administrative Region of China - Hong Kong and Macao.
- Applicants must not have received any financial support from the Chinese government, such as the CSC scholarship, during their studies.
- Applicants must not have received this award previously.
- Applicants in Group A and B must be no more than 40 and 45 years old, respectively, at the time of application.
- Applicants must have completed at least two years of their PhD program.

== Application process ==
=== Voluntary application ===
The call for applications is voluntary and open to all self-financed Chinese students from any academic discipline. The application process is typically completed through an online system. During the online submission process, applicants are required to indicate their local Chinese consulate, which will allocate their applications for initial differential selection.

=== Initial selection by the local consulate ===
The local Chinese Consulate or Educational Affairs Office of Chinese Embassy will invite and organize experts, usually professors in notable universities in the local area, to conduct an initial differential selection based upon the applicants' achievement record and merits, and forward the ranking/reserving list to the domestic competent department, Ministry of Education of China.

=== Finalist by domestic evaluators ===
The Ministry of Education (MOE) will conduct the final evaluation or approval process. After the rankings are finalized, the MOE will publish the list of finalists and inform the results to the Chinese Consulates or Education Offices. The individual awardees will be informed of their selection by the Chinese Consulates or Education Offices, who will then hold an award ceremony to recognize the recipients.

== Ceremony ==
The awarding ceremony is held each year at the local Chinese consulate. The attendees usually include the general consul, education counselors, evaluation experts, awardees and their supervisors, invited international guests, journalists, etc.

== Past recipients ==
| 2003 | 2004 | 2005 | 2007 | 2008 |
| 2009 | 2010 | 2011 | 2012 | 2013 |
| 2014 | 2015 | 2016 | 2017 | 2018 |
| 2019 | 2020 | 2021 | [--] | [--] |

== Notable recipients ==
- Yuan Cao, MIT postdoc, 2018 Nature's 10, "graphene wrangler".
- Karson T. F. Kung, the first awardee of Hong Kong citizenship, PhD Cambridge University, now assistant professor at the University of Hong Kong.
- Zhan Guo, Associate Professor at New York University
- Peng Yin, Biologist
- Xiaojun Yan, Political writer
- Pengkai Pan, Founder and CEO of Alo7
- Lerong Lu, Lawyer, Academic, and Writer, Lecturer in Law at University of Bristol
- Wenjun Lu, Associate Professor at Norwegian University of Science and Technology
