= Kathy Chow =

Hong Kong actress (1966–2023)

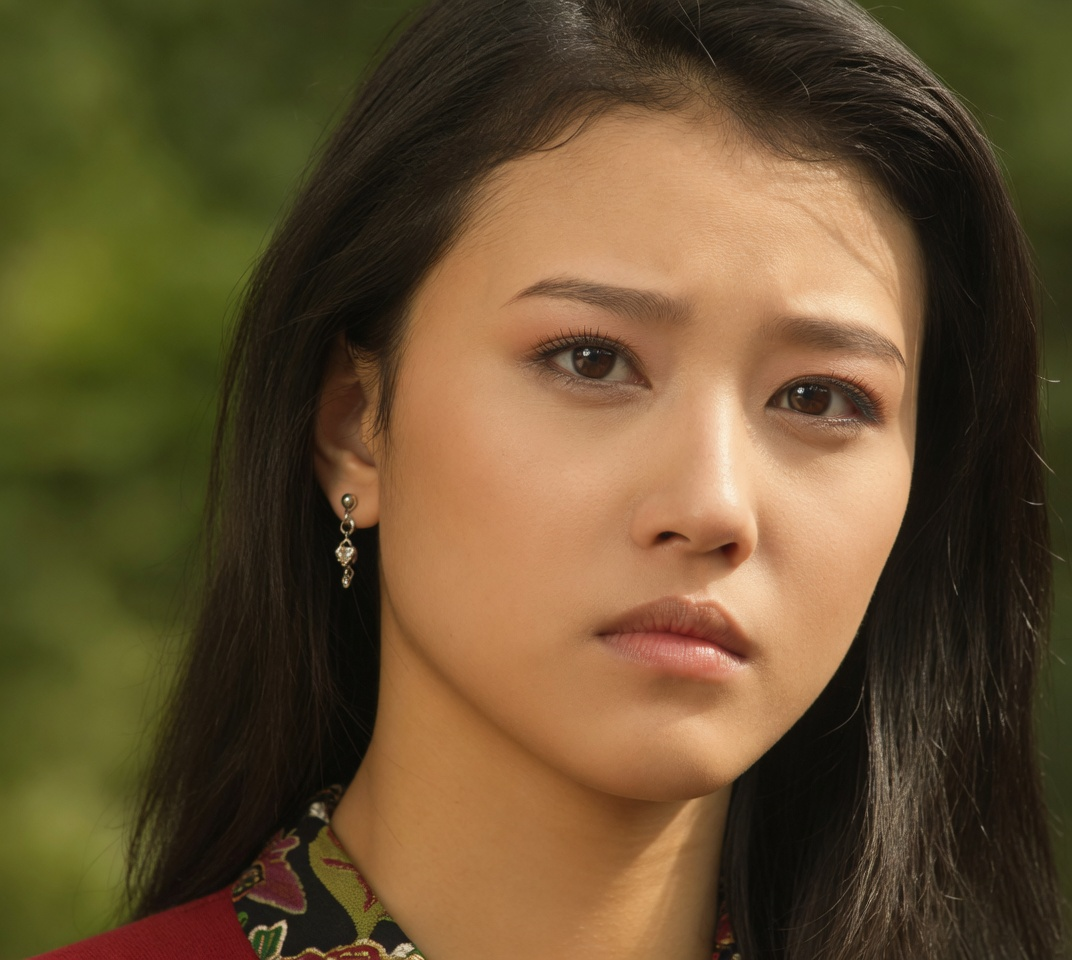
- Chow on set during filming
- Born: 6 December 1966; Hong Kong
- Died: 11 December 2023 (aged 57); Beijing, China
- Education: High school
- Occupations: Actress, singer
- Years active: 1985–2023
- Spouse: Ray Lui (m. 1988; div. 1989)

Chinese name
- Traditional Chinese: 周海媚
- Simplified Chinese: 周海媚
Transcriptions
Standard Mandarin
- Hanyu Pinyin: Zhōu Hǎimèi
Yue: Cantonese
- Jyutping: Zaau1 Hoi2 Mei6
- Musical career
- Also known as: Hoi Mei (海味)
- Origin: Hong Kong
- Labels: TVB (1985–1997、2008–2009、2012–2014); ATV (1998–2001)

Kathy Chow Hoi-mei (Chinese: 周海媚; pinyin: Zhōu Hǎimèi; Jyutping: Zaau1 Hoi2 Mei6; 6 December 1966 – 11 December 2023), or Kathy Chau Hoi-mei (Note: As seen from the photo-book taken by Sachiku Koro in Japan in 1996.), was a Hong Kong actress and singer. She was a leading actress in TVB dramas during the late 1980s to 1990s, such as The Breaking Point and Time Before Time. She gained wide acclaim for her portrayal of her portrayal of Zhou Zhiruo in the 1994 Taiwanese adaptation of The Heaven Sword and Dragon Saber. Since the 2000s, she primarily worked in mainland China.

== Life and career ==
Kathy Chow was born in Hong Kong on 6 December 1966. She was an ethnic Manchu, descended from the Gūwalgiya clan of the Bordered White Banner. Chow was a Miss Hong Kong pageant participant in 1985. During the late 1980s and 1990s, she actively modeled and starred in Hong Kong TVB series.

Chow switched work to ATV in 1998. During this time she would occasionally be featured in Hong Kong films and appear in award shows. Kathy was only with ATV up to 2001 and later went to Beijing to follow new career prospects.

In March 2008, Chow returned to TVB and signed on to TVB's action E.U., the sequel to The Academy and On the First Beat.

In later years, she starred occasionally in a few TVB series, but her focus was still on mainland China's productions.

On 11 December 2023, Kathy Chow died in Beijing from an illness at the age of 57. After Chow's death announcement, her artist friend Tin Kai-man confirmed that she had been suffering from lupus for many years. Chow was also rumoured to have suffered from lupus several times during her lifetime. However, she had denied all these rumours, claiming that she only had a condition of thrombocytopenia with unknown cause.

On 27 December 2023, Kathy's sister issued a statement which revealed that the actual cause of death was sudden heart attack. This had been confirmed with coroners. The statement also mentioned that all her pets had already been adopted by animal lovers around Beijing. The funeral procession and the burial site would be kept private, but her bone ash and burial site would both be in Hong Kong.

== Filmography ==
=== Television series ===
- 2020 – Count Your Lucky Stars 我好喜欢你 (Youku)
- 2019 – Heavenly Sword and Dragon Slaying Sabre 倚天屠龙记 (Tencent)
- 2018 – Ashes of Love 香蜜沉沉烬如霜 (JSTV)
- 2017 – As Flowers Fade And Fly Across The Sky 花谢花飞花满天 (ZJTV)
- 2017 – Xuan-Yuan Sword Legend: The Clouds of Han 轩辕剑之汉之云 (Dragon TV)
- 2015 – The Cage of Love 抓住彩虹的男人 (ZJTV)
- 2014 – The Empress of China 武媚娘传奇 (Hunan TV)
- 2013 – Sniper Standoff 神枪狙击 (TVB)
- 2012 – Wang Yang Ming 王阳明 (韩国CHING TV)
- 2009 – In the Chamber of Bliss 蔡鍔與小鳳仙 (TVB)
- 2009 – E.U. (Emergency Unit) 學警狙擊 (TVB)
- 2008 – The Legend of the Condor Heroes 射雕英雄传 (KMTV-1)
- 2007 – Ao Jian Jiang Hu 傲剑江湖 (CTV)
- 2003 – Asian Heroes 亚洲英雄 亞洲英雄 (ATV)
- 2001 – To Where He Belongs 縱橫天下 / 纵横天下 (ATV)
- 2000 – Showbiz Tycoon 影城大亨 (ATV)
- 1999 – Flaming Brothers 縱橫四海 (ATV)
- 1998 – Secret of the Heart 天地豪情 (TVB)
- 1997 – Time Before Time 大鬧廣昌隆 (TVB)
- 1996 – 今生今世 (TVS－4"黄金剧场")
- 1995 – Plain Love 情濃大地 (TVB)
- 1994 – The Heaven Sword and Dragon Saber 倚天屠龍記 (TTV)
- 1991 – The Breaking Point 今生無悔 (TVB)
- 1991 – The Sword Of Conquest 怒劍嘯狂沙 (TVB)
- 1990 – Cherished Moments 回到未嫁時 (TVB)
- 1990 – Rain in the Heart 成功路上 (TVB)
- 1990 – Where I Belong 笑傲在明天 (TVB)
- 1989 – Looking Back in Anger 義不容情 (TVB)
- 1989 – The Legend of Master Chan 吉星報喜 (TVB)
- 1988 – The Saga of the Lost Kingdom 贏單傳奇 (TVB)
- 1987 – The Price of Growing Up 生命之旅 (TVB)
- 1987 – Fate Takes A Hand 杜心五 (TVB)
- 1986 – The Superlative Affections 赤腳紳士 (TVB)
- 1986 – The Upheaval 小岛风云 (TVB)
- 1986 – Heir to the Throne Is... 真命天子 (TVB)
- 1986 – The Feud of Two Brothers 流氓大亨 (TVB)
- 1985 – The Yang's Saga 楊家將 (TVB)

=== Films ===
- 2020 – Returning from Armor (卸甲归来)
- 2019 – Bone China (骨瓷)
- 2019 – The Rookies (素人特工)
- 2019 – The Magic School (捉妖学院)
- 2019 – The Incredible Monk 3 (济公之降龙有悔)
- 2017 – Mr.Pride VS Miss Prejudice (傲娇与偏见)
- 2015 – Hot Blood Band (熱血男人幫)
- 2013 – The Legend of Dunhuang (敦煌傳奇)
- 2011 – Legendary Amazons (楊門女將之軍令如山)
- 2011 – To Love or Not (一夜未了情)
- 2007 – Crazy Money & Funny Men (大話股神)
- 2004 – A Decisive Move (同步凶間)
- 2004 – City Crisis (中年危機)
- 2003 – We're Not the Worst (五個墮落的男女)
- 2002 – Memento (35米厘兇心人)
- 2001 – Vampire Controller (趕屍先生)
- 2000 – A Game of No Rule (無法無天)
- 2000 – Sound from the Dark (陰風耳)
- 1998 – Nude Fear (追兇20年)
- 1998 – The Sleepless Town (不夜城)
- 1998 – Beast Cops (野獸刑警)
- 1998 – Cheap Killers (愈墮落愈英雄)
- 1998 – The Love and Sex of the Eastern Hollywood (愛在娛樂圈的日子)
- 1997 – Cause We Are So Young (求戀期)
- 1996 – First Option (飛虎)
- 1995 – Don't Give a Damn (冇面俾)
- 1994 – Love Recipe (愛情色香味)
- 1994 – The Private Eye Blues (非常偵探)
- 1993 – Fight Back to School III (逃學威龍III之龍過雞年)
- 1993 – Insanity (觸目驚心)
- 1992 – James Wong in Japan & Korea (帶你嫖韓日)
- 1991 – The Holy Virgin Versus the Evil Dead (魔唇劫)
- 1990 – King of Gambler (賭王)
- 1990 – The Wildgoose Chase (不文小丈夫)
- 1989 – My Dear Son (我要富貴)
- 1989 – Nobody's Hero (情義我心知)
- 1988 – The Truth (法內情)
- 1988 – How to Pick Girls Up! (求愛敢死隊)
- 1986 – Cadets on the Beat (豬仔出更)

== Studio albums ==
- 1995 – Sunrise Love (日出愛情)
- 1997 – Loving You (迷戀你)

== Other appearances ==
Kathy Chow Hoi-Mei also appeared in Jacky Cheung's music video for the song 吻別 in 1993.
