= Yat sang ho kau =

Studio album by Danny Chan
- Released: June 1989
- Recorded: March 1989
- Genre: Cantopop
- Label: Warner Music

Danny Chan chronology
| Winter Warmth (1988) | Yat sang ho kau (1989) | Wait for You (1990) |

Yat sang ho kau (Chinese: 一生何求; Jyutping: Jat1 sang1 ho4 kau4; pinyin: Yīshēng hé qiú) is a Cantonese-language Hong Kong album by Danny Chan, released by Warner Music (WEA) in June 1989.

The title track became one of the top ten songs in the 1989 RTHK Top 10 Gold Songs Awards. In the 1989 Jade Solid Gold Best Ten Music Awards Presentation, it was ranked four of the Top Ten Gold Songs (十大勁歌金曲獎) and won the Best Lyrics Awards (最佳填詞獎). Other singers have rendered this song since, including Deric Wan.

The album of the same name received a Local Platinum Disc award from the International Federation of the Phonographic Industry (IFPI) in 1990 for selling at least 30,000 copies in Hong Kong.

== Track listing ==
1. "Hot Night"
  Music: To Tzi Tsi (杜自持); Lyrics: Richard Lam (林振強)
2. "Heartbreak Road" (心碎路口; sam1seoi3 lou6hau2)
  Music: Michael Lai (黎小田); Lyrics: Keith Chan Siu Kei (陳少琪)
3. "Speak without a Conscience" (背著良心的說話 "Booi tseok leung saam dik suet wah")
  Music: Tsui Yat Kan (徐日勤); Lyrics: Lin Xi (林夕)
4. "Who Is a Friend?" (誰是知己 "Seoi si gee gei")
  Music: Lam Manyee (林敏怡); Lyrics: Lin Xi
5. "Wind Chimes" (冷暖風鈴 "Laang nuen fung ling")
  Music: Wong Ching Yu (王正宇); Lyrics: Law Wing Keung (盧永強)
6. "Meaning of Life" (一生何求 "yat sang ho kau")
  Cantonese rendition of Mandarin song, "Sometimes Thinking" (惦記這一些; diànjì zhè yīxiē), from the album One Game, One Dream (一場遊戲一場夢; yīchǎng yóuxì yīchǎng mèng) by Dave Wang
  Music: Wang Wen-ching (王文清); Lyrics: Poon Wai Jyun (潘偉源)
  Opening theme of the TVB Drama Looking Back in Anger
7. "Right or Wrong" (對不對 "Deoi bat deoi")
  Music: Cho Chon Hung (曹俊鴻) and Wong Dai Kwan (黃大軍); Lyrics: Poon Yuen Leung (潘源良)
8. "Wanderer" (流浪者 "lau long tse")
  Cantonese rendition of 1960s song, "I Only Want to Be with You"
  Music: Mike Hawker and Ivor Raymonde; Lyrics: Poon Wai Jyun
9. "Previously... as Always" (過去...永遠都如此 "Kwo heoi... wing yuen dau jyu tsi")
  Cantonese rendition of Japanese song, "You", theme song of anime Oishinbo by Megumi Yuumi (結城めぐみ)
  Music: Izumi Tsune Hiroshi (和泉常寛); Lyrics: Richard Lam
10. "Sexy" (奢侈 "tse tsi"; lit. "Luxury")
  Cantonese rendition of "Looking for a New Love" by Jody Watley
  Music: Jody Watley and André Cymone; Lyrics: Thomas Chow (周禮茂)
