= Plain Love =

- 情濃大地
- Genre: Period Drama
- Starring: Gallen Lo; Kathy Chow; Eddie Cheung
- Opening theme: "故地濃情" (Plain Love) by Kenny Ho
- Country of origin: Hong Kong
- Original language: Cantonese
- No. of episodes: 20

Original release
- Network: TVB
- Release: 3 April – 28 April 1995

Related
- Plain Love II (茶是故鄉濃, 1999); Country Spirit (酒是故鄉醇, 2001)

Plain Love (Chinese: 情濃大地, Mandarin: qíng nóng dà dì, Cantonese: ching nung daai dei, "Everlasting Earth") was a television drama series produced by TVB. The series takes place in Republican China, focusing on the lives and trials of a servant family. The series was released overseas in 1994 before broadcasting on TVB Jade in 1995.

== Plot ==
The Kwan family are powerful and wealthy landowners of a village in Dunggun who tenant out their land to local farmers in return for crops. Their family consists of two elder sons, a daughter and a youngest son.

Lau Ah Choi is an orphan who through a series of unfortunate events ended up as a child bride of the youngest master (4th young master) of the Kwan's. Although, the 4th young mistress in name, Ah Choi is treated as the maid and personal servant to the 4th young master.

Ah Choi grew up to a beautiful and sensible young lady catching the attention of the lecherous eldest young master and studious second young master of the Kwan's.

One day, the 4th young master and Ah Choi went out to play. The oldest son Kwan Tin Fook (關天福) follows them, and eventually traps Ah Choi in an empty barn and attempted to rape Ah Choi. Ah Choi was able to make her escape from the barn, but Fong Shu Gan (方樹根) happens to see her running out of the barn disheveled with Tin Fook coming out a short while later. The 4th young master had fallen into a rice field of water and was nearly drowned. He becomes I’ll and eventually succumbs to his death. The Kwan family decided Ah Choi is bad luck and Tin Fook lies about Ah Choi trying to seduce him. The Kwans knowing their second son Kwan Tim Jam (關天蔭) falling in love with her, they misled Tin Jam to think they drowned her in the river. TinJam decides to leave the village and continue his studies in the city. To get rid of Ah Choi and save face at the same time, the patriarch of the Kwan family and village leader, Kwan Hok Jyu (關學儒), offered Ah Choi as a bride to Fong Shu Gan (方樹根) which he was forced by his father to accept the marriage. On the night of their marriage, he discovered that Ah Choi was still a virgin thus he changes his mind about her after they consummated their marriage.

Life was good for Ah Choi and Shu Gan at first. Ah Choi was accepted into the Fong family and willingly played the role of a good daughter in law. Shu Gan was tricked into purchasing a rice field without a water source, but through his stubborn nature, and help from Ah Choi, he was able to make his first harvest and pay back his debt. Eventually Ah Choi became pregnant with the Shu Gan’s child. Tin Jam had returned to the village and discovered Ah Choi was not only alive, but is now married and carrying Shu Gan’s child. His return invokes jealousy in Shu Gan. Ah Choi went into labor when she was alone with Tin Jam, who studied medicine and helped to deliver her baby. SHu Gan arrives and discovers Tin Jam holding his newborn child and rejected his child and turned away from ah Choi.

As a drought strikes the village, causing famine, the villagers than despoil and raid the Kwan household. Noticing Tin Fook running away with his wealth, his relative Kwan Dai Mai (關大米) attacks him, but Tin Fook uses a flowerpot to crush his testicles so that he will escape. After some persuasion by Shu Gan, the villagers instead restore the Kwans' household.

The father of the Fongs was killed as he tries to save his grandson from being snatched off, as he dies he tells Shu Gan to leave so that his grandson can have a better life. After some difficulty in the city, the Kwans return to the village. Shu Gan saves his village from starvation by bringing a cart of rice sacks, and ensues its prosperity.

Kwan Dai Mai and several villagers plan to drown a woman from the Kwan family in revenge for the drowning of Lap Cheun, but was persuaded against such actions. Having failed to avenge Lap Cheun, he leaves, with some coins for the Fongs. Then, Tim Jam returns from the city from a bout of gambling. Having been beaten up for failing to pay his expenses, Nga Choi pays for Tim Jam.

Kwan Tin Fook returns to the village, this time as an army leader, to seize his farm village back. He harasses Shu Gan and falsely accuses him of murder, and tries to rape Nga Choi.

Tin Fook conscripts the men of his village, including Shu Gan and Tim Jam into his army, amid protests and attempts by the Kwans to stop him. He sells off Shu Gan's son Fong Ah-Tin to Nanyang. Tin Fook himself was later killed in battle.

In the present day, Shu Gan and Nga Choi meet again by their old village, near a tree, after some counselling. Ah Tin returns by his car to meet them.

== Cast ==
- Gallen Lo Ka-Leung as Fong Shu Gan (方樹根), the main character of the series and father of Ah Tin. Worst enemy of Tin Fook.
- Kathy Chow Hoi-Mei as Lau Nga Choi (劉亞彩), Shu Gan's wife and mother of Ah Tin.
- Eddie Cheung Siu Fai as Kwan Tim Jam (關天蔭), the second oldest son of the Kwan family.
- Kwan Hoi-San as Kwan Hok Jyu (關學儒), the patriarch of the Kwan family.
- Wilson Tsui as Kwan Tin Fook (關天福), the entitled eldest son of the Kwan family, enemy of Shu Gan, and main antagonist.
- Tsui Ga-Bo as Tsiu Jeuk Lan (趙若蘭), Kwan Tin Fook's wife.
- Chan Pui-Saan as Fong Lap Cheun (方立春), the servant girl who was framed to be drowned in a basket.
- Wong Wai-Leung as Kwan Dai Mai or Dai Bao Mai (關大米, 大包米), the embittered relative of the Kwans.
- Florence Kwok as Jung Jyun Saan (鍾婉珊)

== Sequel ==
The 1999 series Plain Love II (茶是故鄉濃) is considered a sequel to this series, although it uses different characters.
