= Cindy Tsai =

American chess player (born 1985)

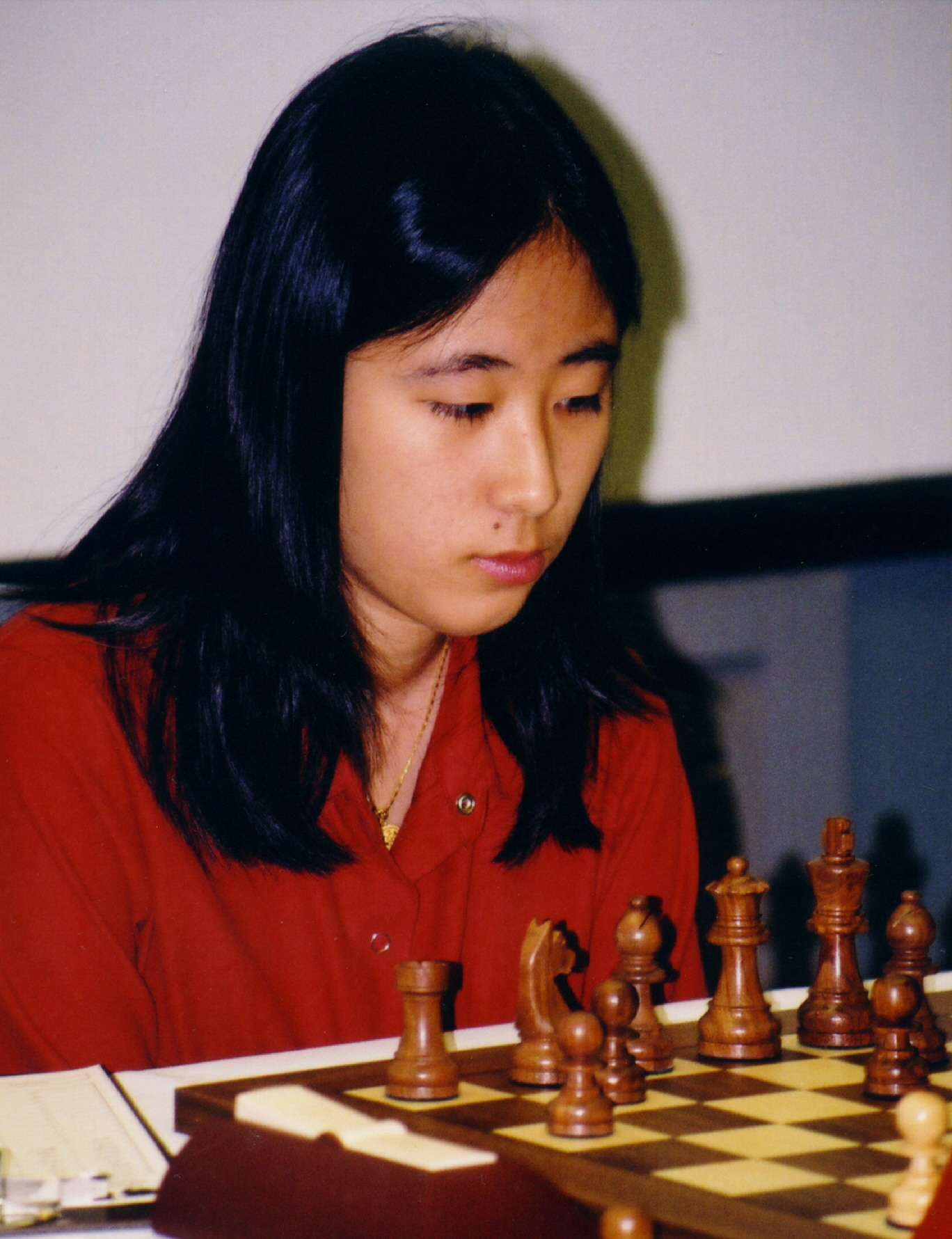
- Tsai at the 2003 U.S. Chess Championships

Personal information
- Born: July 9, 1985 (age 41) Chicago, Illinois

Chess career
- Country: United States
- Title: Woman International Master (2002)
- FIDE rating: 2152 (July 2006) [inactive]
- Peak rating: 2204 (October 2002)

Cindy Tsai (born 9 July 1985) is an American chess player.

== Biography ==
Tsai was born in Chicago, Illinois and grew up in Gainesville, Florida. Her family is from Taiwan, including her great-aunt Tsai Chih-chan. At age 7, chess teacher George Pyne taught Tsai how to play chess. In later youth, her trainers were George Rottman, Arno Nolting, Tim Hartigan and grandmaster Gabriel Schwartzman. At Stanford University in Stanford, California, she was awarded the Chapell-Lougee Scholarship for psychology research on elite chessplayers in France and Switzerland in 2005. After graduating, she became a manager at smartphone company Peek in New York City. From 2009 to 2011, Tsai completed the Master of Business Administration program at the Kellogg School of Management at Northwestern University near Chicago, Illinois.

== Chess career ==
The World Chess Federation FIDE awarded Tsai the lifetime title of Woman International Master in 2002 when she was age 16. Tsai achieved 2 of three Woman Grandmaster (WGM) norms. As a professional chess player, she played 147 total games from 1995 to 2008 with 65 wins (44.2%).

From 1995 to 2003, Tsai competed for the US team in annual World Youth and Pan-American Youth Chess Championships in Brazil, France, Spain, Bolivia, Argentina, Paraguay, Ecuador and India. At the World Youth Chess Championships, Tsai finished 5th place twice. In Pan American Chess Championship for female youth, Cindy Tsai won 5 titles: U14 in May 1998 in Florianópolis, U16 in June 2000 in Bento Gonçalves, Rio Grande do Sul, U16 in June 2001 in Guaymallén Department, U20 in June 2002 in La Paz, and U20 in September 2004 in Guayaquil.

In her early career, Tsai played for the Hidden Oak Elementary School in Gainesville, Florida.

In the British Four Nations Chess League (4NCL), she played in 2005/06 two games for the Oxford team. Tsai was inactive since the 2005/06 until she played for the US women's national team at the 2008 World Mind Sports Games in Beijing, China.
