= The Mystery of Death =

- 死亡之谜
- Directed by: Ben Wong
- Production companies: Beijing Lehua Yuanyu Media Co., Ltd; Shanghai Huahua Media Co., Ltd; Tibet Yuehua Media Co., Ltd; Beijing Jiale Chuangxin Entertainment Co., Ltd; Dadi Century Films（Beijing）Co., Ltd
- Release date: 6 February 2015
- Running time: 86 minutes
- Country: China
- Languages: Mandarin; Cantonese
- Box office: CN¥1.62 million

The Mystery of Death (Chinese: 死亡之谜), also known as The Mystery of Death: Pisces Jade Pendant (Chinese: 死亡之谜之双鱼玉佩), is a 2015 Chinese adventure suspense thriller film directed by Ben Wong. It was released on 6 February 2015.

== Plot ==
The film had been adapting off of the Pisces Jade Pendant legend.

== Cast ==
- Deric Wan
- Huang Zheng
- Josephine Yu
- Sui Shuyang
- Yang Xinrui

== Reception ==
By 9 February 2015, the film had earned CN¥1.62 million at the Chinese box office.
