= Tsai Chih-chan =

Taiwanese poet and educator

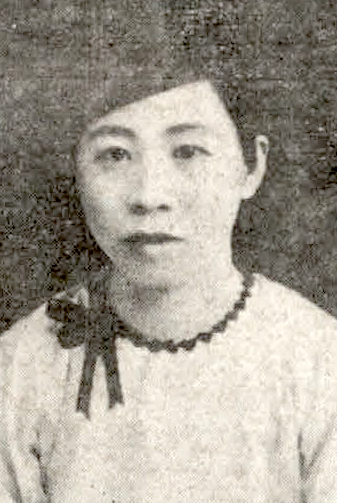
- Tsai Chih-chan around 1932.
- Native name: 蔡旨禅
- Born: May 26, 1900 Penghu
- Died: April 21, 1958 (aged 57) Penghu, Taiwan
- Occupation: Poet, teacher, painter
- Relatives: Cindy Tsai (great-niece)

Tsai Chih-chan (May 26, 1900 – April 21, 1958; Chinese: 蔡旨禅) was a Taiwanese poet and educator known for her work during the Japanese colonial period.

== Biography ==
Tsai Chih-chan was born in 1900 on Magong in the Penghu islands, which were occupied by Japan at the time. A studious child, by age 9 she had become a devout Buddhist and a committed vegetarian. She vowed never to marry and instead to focus on her faith and on supporting her parents, who gave birth to her after a long struggle with infertility. According to biographer Wei Hsiu-ling, she likely did not obtain a formal Japanese education but instead studied Chinese literature with private tutors.

Despite her modest background, Tsai became a well-regarded poet during the Japanese colonial period, with her work appearing in various publications from 1923 to 1937. In 1933, her work was featured in the Yingzhou Poetry Anthology. Overall, she produced around 600 poems, frequently dealing with both her own struggles and experiences as a woman as well as Buddhism and Zen. She also became a painter during this period, even traveling to study traditional painting at China's Amoy College of Art, now part of Xiamen University, in 1934.

Tsai also worked as an educator, starting at the Chengyuan Temple in 1924, becoming the first female Chinese teacher in the Pengu islands. Later that year, she left Pengu to teach in Changhua, aiming to "make [her] name known as a woman," as she wrote in a poem before her departure. There, she established a Confucian school, which she named Pingquanxuan (平權軒; "Equal Rights Pavilion"). She also worked as a private tutor for the women of the prominent Wufeng Lin family beginning in 1927. In 1932, she moved to Hsinchu to teach there, and she lived for a period in Hsinchu's Lingyin Temple.

Tsai's economic independence and social status were unusual for Taiwanese women at the time, although her position as a celibate religious leader helped with her empowerment. She was a firm believer in women's right to education and independence; a 1932 article in a poetry journal described her as having "determination to seek equal rights and freedom for women."

After returning to Pengu in 1955, Tsai and her adopted brother sued to regain control of the Chengyuan Temple, which had been taken over by Kuomintang troops. After they won their suit in 1957, she ran the temple's operations until her sudden death of a stroke the following year.
