= Xie Xide =

Chinese physicist (1921–2000)

Professor Xie Xide
- 谢希德
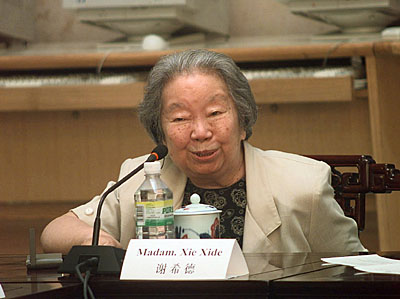
- Xie in 1998
- Born: March 19, 1921; Quanzhou, Fujian, China
- Died: March 4, 2000 (aged 78); Shanghai, China
- Other names: Hsi-teh Hsieh; Hilda Hsieh
- Education: Xiamen University (B.S.); Smith College (M.S.); Massachusetts Institute of Technology (PhD)
- Occupations: Politician; President of Fudan University; Physics Academic
- Employer: Fudan University
- Known for: Physics; University Administrator; CPCC delegate
- Spouse: Cao Tianqin
- Honours: Fellow of the American Physical Society, Academician of The World Academy of Sciences, Distinguished Scholar of the Committee on Scholarly Communication with The People's Republic of China

Xie Xide (simplified Chinese: 谢希德; traditional Chinese: 謝希德; pinyin: Xiè Xīdé; Pe̍h-ōe-jī: Chiā Hi-tek; 19 March 1921 – 4 March 2000), also known as Hsi-teh Hsieh and as Hilda Hsieh, was a Chinese physicist. She was president of Fudan University from 1983 to 1989, and remained as advisor to the university from 1989 until her death. She helped to set up the university's Centre for American Studies and founded its Modern Physics Institute in 1977.

Xie also served as a member in the Central Committee of the Chinese Communist Party from 1982 to 1992.

== Biography ==
Xie Xide was born March 19, 1921, in the port city of Quanzhou in Fujian, southeastern China. She was born into a family that valued education. Her father Xie Yuming had a Ph.D. from University of Chicago and taught at Yenching University in Beijing. Xie Yuming precisely measured the spectrum of hydrogen atom during his study in the US. The famous theoretical physicist, Yang Chen-Ning referred to Xie Yuming as the person that the Nobel Prize missed.

Xide spent part of her childhood in Beijing. She attended Yenching Elementary School and was a top student in school. She met Cao Tianqin when Cao transferred to Yenching. Cao constantly beat Xie in school performance and the two became good friends. When the Second Sino-Japanese War broke out, Xie when to Hunan University to study physics; but she had to withdraw from school due to illness of bone tuberculosis. Different hospitals diagnosed that her illness is not treatable so she returned home to fight the illness with her family's help. Cao started sending her numerous letters in the name of academic discussions, which helped Xie cheer up and continue her studies. In 1942, not only did Xie survive, through her self-study at home, she was also admitted to Xiamen University to study physics and mathematics. Xie graduated in 1946. She taught at University of Shanghai for a year, and then was able to get a scholarship to study for a master's degree in physics at Smith College in the United States, graduating in 1949. She continued her studies at Massachusetts Institute of Technology, earning a Ph.D. in theoretical physics in 1951.

In 1950, many Chinese science scholars were detained in the United States as political hostage against China arising from the Korean War, including the famous Chinese aerodynamicist, cyberneticist and politician Qian Xuesen. Xie was detained in the US despite her strong willingness to return to her motherland. From 1951 to 1952 she worked on the research staff at MIT. In 1952, Cao Tianqin, who was studying in United Kingdom at that time, obtained a "special certificate" to pledge for her release in order to have their wedding in UK. Xide was released. Cao Tianqin (Tien-chin Tsao) and Xie Xide were married in UK; their son, Cao Weizheng, was born in 1956.

After marriage, Xie returned to China and became a lecturer in the Department of Physics at Fudan University in Shanghai, one of China's top universities. She served in this position from 1952 to 1956. She became an associate professor at Fudan and served in that capacity from 1956 to 1962. From 1958 to 1966 she served as adjunct director, Shanghai Institute of Technical Physics, Chinese Academy of Sciences. In 1962 she was appointed Professor of Physics, Fudan University and continued in that capacity.

Xie Xide was an outstanding educational leader, and also a key figure in the development of China's educational relations with the international community. She was a joint-author of one of the most widely used physics textbooks in China, "Semiconductor Physics". In 1958, she passed out in her lab due to overworking and was diagnosed with late-stage kidney stone and heart disease when she was sent to hospital. She resumed teaching after several big surgeries. In 1966, as numerous Cultural Revolution victims among China's educated scholars, Xide was sent to do hard labor choirs despite her illness; she was later diagnosed with breast cancer. She did not give up and still dedicated herself fully to education. In 1978, National Science Conference in Beijing was held and Xide resumed her occupation. From 1978 to 1983 she served as Director of the Institute of Modern Physics of Fudan University. She was appointed vice president of Fudan in 1978, and President in 1983, serving in that capacity until 1988. During her tenure, she founded Center for American Studies in Fudan to encourage students to learn about world leading research and international relations. She was the first woman president of a major comprehensive university in the PRC. From 1985 she also served as Director of the Center for American Studies of Fudan University, and in 1988 she was appointed Advisor to Fudan University. Despite her health, she actively encouraged and recommended her students to study abroad.

Xie Xide pursued a distinguished career as a scientist, making important contributions in the field of solid-state physics. Her research work was concentrated in solid state physics, semiconductor physics, and surface physics.

Xie Xide was appointed to the Communist Party's Central Committee in 1982 and served as one of 210 full members.

Xie Xide's husband, Cao Tianqin suffered a coma in 1987 when he was attending a global biology and ecology conference in Israel. He was since paralyzed in bed and suffered memory loss. Despite her own illness, Xide took care of Cao by planning his meal and helping him on physical therapy. She continued doing so for 8 years until Cao died in 1995. Xie continued her work in hospital as she fought with cancer. She died on March 4, 2000 and donated her whole body to China's medical research.

== Published works ==
Xie Xide published more than eighty papers and several books and monographs.

Some of Xie's published work include:

- Hsieh, Hsi-Teh; Goldey, James M.; Brown, Sanborn C. (1954). "A Resonant Cavity Study of Semiconductors". Journal of Applied Physics. 25 (3). AIP Publishing: 302–307. Bibcode:1954JAP....25..302H. doi:10.1063/1.1721630. ISSN 0021-8979.
- Xide, Xie; Kaiming, Zhang (1988). "Electronic properties of metals chemisorbed on semiconductor surface and metal/semiconductor interfaces". Progress in Surface Science. 28 (2). Elsevier BV: 71–179. Bibcode:1988PrSS...28...71X. doi:10.1016/0079-6816(88)90009-3. ISSN 0079-6816.
- "Overview of Metal/Semiconductor Interfaces," The Structure of Surfaces. Springer Series in Surface Sciences 24. Berlin: Springer, 1991, p. 576.
- Xie, Xide; Zhang, Kaiming (1994). "Recent developments in some metal/semiconductor and superlattice interfaces". Materials Chemistry and Physics. 38 (1). Elsevier BV: 1–13. doi:10.1016/0254-0584(94)90139-2. ISSN 0254-0584.
- Zi, Jian; Zhang, Kaiming; Xie, Xide (1997). "Vibrational properties of SiGe superlattices". Progress in Surface Science. 54 (1). Elsevier BV: 69–113. doi:10.1016/s0079-6816(97)00002-6. ISSN 0079-6816.
- Shen, Jianhua; Zi, Jian; Xie, Xide; Jiang, Ping (1997-11-15). "Ab initiocalculation of the structure of the random alloys Sn_{x}Ge_{1−x}". Physical Review B. 56 (19). American Physical Society (APS): 12084–12087. Bibcode:1997PhRvB..5612084S. doi:10.1103/physrevb.56.12084. ISSN 0163-1829.

Xie also published the following books:

- Semiconductor Physics. Science Press, 1958, with K. Huang.
- Group Theory and Its Applications. China: Science Publisher, 1986.

== Honors ==
Xie Xide had received honorary doctorates from twelve universities worldwide, including the United States, United Kingdom, Japan, Canada, Hong Kong and China. Xie Xide was a Fellow of the American Physical Society, an Academician of The World Academy of Sciences (TWAS), and a Distinguished Scholar of the Committee on Scholarly Communication with The People's Republic of China.

Political offices
Preceded by Li Guohao	Chair of the CPPCC Shanghai Municipal Committee; 1988–1993	Succeeded by Chen Tiedi
