= Cao Tianqin =

Chinese biochemist

- Born: 5 December 1920; Beijing, China
- Died: 8 January 1995 (aged 74); Shanghai, China
- Education: Yenching University; University of Cambridge
- Known for: Discovery of myosin light chain
- Spouse: Xie Xide
- Scientific career
- Fields: Biochemistry
- Workplaces: University of Cambridge; Shanghai Institute of Biochemistry
- Doctoral advisor: Kenneth Bailey
- Notable students: Zhang Youshang, Qi Zhengwu, Li Zaiping, Peng Jiamu

Chinese name
- Simplified Chinese: 曹天钦
- Traditional Chinese: 曹天欽
Transcriptions
Standard Mandarin
- Hanyu Pinyin: Cáo Tiānqīn
- Wade–Giles: Ts'ao T'ien-ch'in

Cao Tianqin (Chinese: 曹天钦; 5 December 1920 – 8 January 1995), also known as Tien-chin Tsao, was a Chinese biochemist and a professor at the Shanghai Institute of Biochemistry. With a research focus on muscle protein, he discovered the myosin light chain and pioneered the study of tropomyosin and paramyosin using electron microscopes. He was a strong advocate and main leader for the synthesis of insulin, and spearheaded the research of plant viruses in China.

An academician of the Chinese Academy of Sciences (CAS) and a foreign member of the Royal Swedish Academy of Engineering Sciences, he served as President of the CAS Shanghai Branch. He was the husband of the renowned physicist Xie Xide.

== Early life ==
Cao was born in Beijing on 5 December 1920. He entered the affiliated high school of Yenching University in 1932, and was admitted to the Chemistry Department of Yenching University in 1935. During the Second Sino-Japanese War, he left Japanese-occupied Beijing for inland "Free China" in 1941. When Yenching was reopened in Chengdu in 1943, he resumed his studies and graduated in 1944. For the next two years he worked at the Sino-British Cooperation Office in China's wartime capital Chongqing, where he helped Joseph Needham research the history of science in China.

== Career ==
After the end of World War II, he received a British Council Scholarship in 1946 on Needham's recommendation and studied under biochemist Kenneth Bailey at the University of Cambridge. At Cambridge he discovered the myosin light chain, a subunit of the myosin protein molecule, and this is considered his most important contribution. In 1951, he earned his Ph.D. and was elected as a fellow of Gonville and Caius College, which was an uncommon honour for a non-British person. He married fellow Chinese scientist Xie Xide in Cambridge in 1952.

On the invitation of Wang Yinglai, Cao returned to China in October 1952 to work for the Shanghai Institute of Physiology and Biochemistry and later the Shanghai Institute of Biochemistry, where he continued his research on muscle proteins. He and his students pioneered the study of tropomyosin and paramyosin using electron microscopes. He was also a strong advocate and main leader for the synthesis of insulin, and spearheaded the research in plant viruses.

Cao was appointed Vice President of the Shanghai Institute of Biochemistry in 1960 and held the position until 1984. He also taught at Fudan University and Shanghai University of Science and Technology. Many of his students later became accomplished scientists, including academicians Zhang Youshang, Qi Zhengwu and Li Zaiping, and explorer Peng Jiamu. Zhang later recalled Cao's lively lectures in which he explained DNA and proteins using references to Romeo and Juliet and the Tao Te Ching.

During the Cultural Revolution, Joseph Needham was accused of being a British spy, and Cao was severely persecuted and imprisoned for his association with Needham. This caused long-term damage to his health, and in the view of Zhang Youshang, led to his relatively early death.

In 1973, Cao participated in the research of the ancient corpse from the Han dynasty tombs of Mawangdui. After the end of the Cultural Revolution, Cao was politically rehabilitated and awarded a National Scientific Achievement Prize in 1978, and elected as a CAS academician in 1980. In the mid-1980s, he served as President of the CAS Shanghai Branch.

== Death ==
Cao died on 8 January 1995 in Shanghai, at the age of 74. After his death, a series of Tianqin Cao Memorial Symposium on Protein Research were held in his memory. Its fourth edition was held in December 2010.
