= The Breaking Point (1991 TV series) =

Hong Kong television series

The Breaking Point (Chinese: 今生無悔) is a Hong Kong television series which aired on TVB in 1991. It starred many Hong Kong stars like Kathy Chow, Maggie Shiu, Deric Wan and Leon Lai. The popular movie-length episodes were dubbed into many other languages and critically influenced Asian cultures.
