= Li Zaiping =

Chinese molecular biologist

- 李载平
- Born: 17 August 1925; Fuzhou, China
- Died: 30 May 2018 (aged 92); Shanghai, China
- Education: Peking University
- Known for: First sequencing of a virus genome (hepatitis B virus) in China; Identification of the LPTS gene
- Awards: Ho Leung Ho Lee Prize for Life Sciences; National Prize of Progress in Science and Technology
- Scientific career
- Fields: Molecular biology
- Workplaces: Shanghai Institute of Biochemistry and Cell Biology; Peking University
- Academic advisors: Cao Tianqin

Li Zaiping (Chinese: 李载平; 17 August 1925 – 30 May 2018) was a Chinese molecular biologist considered a pioneer in genetic science and engineering in China. His research team was the first in China to sequence a virus genome. He also utilized E. coli to produce human EGF and GM-CSF, and identified the gene LPTS. He was a professor at the Shanghai Institute of Biochemistry and Cell Biology and an academician of the Chinese Academy of Engineering.

== Biography ==
Li was born in Fuzhou on 17 August 1925. He graduated from the Department of Chemistry of Peking University in 1947, and became a lecturer of biochemistry at PKU. In 1956, he was admitted as a graduate student to the Shanghai Institute of Biochemistry, where he studied under the academician Cao Tianqin. After graduation in 1960, he founded China's first laboratory for molecular DNA and genetics research at the Shanghai institute. He became a full professor in 1977.

Li's group was the first to sequence the full genomic DNA of pADR-1, the most prevalent subtype of hepatitis B virus in China. It was the first time a virus genome was sequenced in China. The research resulted in the development of a highly effective recombinant hepatitis B vaccine. In another project, he utilized a secretive gene expression system in Escherichia coli to produce human EGF and human GM-CSF, both of which have been approved for medical use. He also identified a new gene called liver-related putative tumor suppressor (LPTS) in chromosome 8p23.

He published more than 200 research papers and won more than 10 national and international prizes including the first-class National Prize of Progress in Science and Technology (three times) and the Ho Leung Ho Lee Prize for Life Sciences. He was elected as an academician of the Chinese Academy of Engineering in 1996.

Li died at Zhongshan Hospital in Shanghai on 30 May 2018, aged 92.
