= Peng Jiamu =

Chinese biochemist and explorer

- Born: 19 May 1925; Guangzhou, Guangdong, Republic of China
- Disappeared: 17 June 1980 (aged 55); Lop Nur, Xinjiang, China
- Occupations: Biochemist, explorer
- Known for: Mysterious disappearance; Cataloguing various species of flora and fauna

Peng Jiamu (simplified Chinese: 彭加木; pinyin: Péng Jiāmù, born 19 May 1925, disappeared 17 June 1980) was a Chinese biochemist and explorer.

== Biography ==
Peng was born in Guangzhou, Guangdong province, in 1935. He received a biology degree from Central University of China (now Nanjing University), graduating in 1947 and subsequently joined the Shanghai Institute of Biochemistry, where he studied and worked under Cao Tianqin. He joined several scientific expeditions to Xinjiang organized by the Chinese Academy of Sciences (CAS), starting in 1956. On the expeditions, he catalogued species of flora and fauna and measured potassium accumulation in the Lop Nor desert.

In 1979, a year before he disappeared in the Lop Desert, he was promoted to the Vice President of the Chinese Academy of Sciences. "Science," he said, "is to walk a road not travelled by other people."

== Disappearance ==
During the year 1980, Peng would lead an expedition to the Lop Nur desert, where he would disappear on 17 June a few days after a dispute, leaving a note referencing that he had gone out to find water.

Peng's disappearance had been during the cold war, and it would be the subject of many conspiracy theories that have been proposed to explain his disappearance, from that of the Pisces Jade Pendant theory, defection to or abductions by foreign powers, the plant virus theory, or extraterrestrial abductions.

A large-scale hunt for him was unsuccessful and widely covered by Chinese media. A TV documentary series named Searching for Peng Jiamu covered the events up to and after his disappearance. On six occasions between 2005 and 2007, human remains were discovered that could have been his, but could not be proven as such. After the fourth hunt, he had been declared a revolutionary martyr by the party.

== See also ==
- List of people who disappeared
- Pisces Jade Pendant
