= Deric Wan =

- Born: Wan Siu-Lun (溫兆麟); 18 November 1964 (age 61); St. Teresa's Hospital, Kowloon, British Hong Kong
- Occupations: Actor; singer; songwriter
- Spouses: Jacqueline Lee (m. 1989; div. 1993) Winnie Poon Yan Lei (m. 2002; div. 2002) Zhao Ting (m. 2013)

Chinese name
- Traditional Chinese: 溫兆倫
- Simplified Chinese: 温兆伦
Transcriptions
Standard Mandarin
- Hanyu Pinyin: wēn zhào lún
Yue: Cantonese
- Jyutping: wan1 siu6 leon4
- Musical career
- Genre: C-pop
- Instrument: Piano
- Label: EMI

Deric Wan Siu-lun (born 18 November 1964) is a Hong Kong actor, singer, and songwriter who has starred in numerous television series and released several studio albums. His representative works include a duet with Nadia Chan, a cover of the song Yat sang ho kau (一生何求), a villainous role in the film So Close and in TVB series such as Looking Back in Anger and The Breaking Point. Wan has worked for Hong Kong–based TVB (1986–1996, 2001–2005) and RTHK, Taiwan (1999–early 2000s) and CCTV. He currently works in China and at STTV.

== Personal life ==
Wan's first marriage was to Malaysian Chinese, Jacqueline Lee. They divorced after four years. His second marriage was to Winnie Poon who he began dating from 1996. The couple married in 2002 and divorced in the same year. He has also been romantically linked to Hong Kong actresses Sara Lee, Bessie Chan, and Sonija Kwok. He has been married to Chinese actress Zhao Ting since 2013. Together they have one daughter.

Since 1997, Wan has expressed his support of Hong Kong no longer being under British rule. He faced some controversy for his pro-China and rather 'anti-colonial' views as expressed on his Weibo account in 2013.

== Selected discography ==
Album titles, unless otherwise, were translated by Wikipedia editors.

=== Solo albums ===
Crown Records (娛樂唱片), Cantonese

- The Ages of Wind and Snow (風雪前塵 fung syut cin can, 1986)
- Love Story (戀愛故事 lyun ngoi gu si, 1987)
- Not Having You Since (沒有你之後 mut yau nei zi hau, 1990)
- The Breaking Point (lit. No Regrets in This Life) / I Never Tried to Have (今生無悔 • 從未試過擁有 gam sang mou fui / cung mei si gwo yung yau, 1991)
- I Am Lovesick / ceoi yuen (我是情痴 • 隨緣 ngo si cing ci / ceoi yuen, 1991)
- I Want to Express My Love (願傾出心裡愛 yuen king ceot sum leoi ngoi, 1992)
- Risking My Life (投入生命 tau yup sang ming, 1993)
- What Do I Get? (我得到什麼 ngo dak dou san mo, 1994)
- A Good Match from Heaven (天降奇緣 tin gong kei jyun, 1997)

Crown Records and UFO Records, Mandarin

- How Long Can You Still Love Me? (還能愛我多久 hai neng ai wo duojiu, 1992)
- You Are Forever (永遠是你 yongyuan shi ni, 1993)
- Us Between the Two Worlds (我們之間兩個世界 wo'men zhijian liang ge shijie, 1994)
- Saying Lies (說謊 shuohuang, 1995)
- My Inherent Goodness (我本善良 wo ben shanliang, 1995)
- Greatest Mandarin Songs (國語最佳精選輯 guoyu zuijia jingxuan ji, 1996) – new and selected past songs
- Complicated (情結 qingjie, 1997)

== Filmography ==
=== Film and television ===
- Radio Tycoon (1983)
- City Japes (1986)
- Friends and Enemies (1988)
- Lemon Husband (1988)
- The Legend of Master Chan (1988)
- War of the Dragon (1989)
- Looking Back in Anger (1989)
- Triangular Entanglement (1990)
- Blood of Good and Evil (1990)
- The Cop Story (1990)
- The Legend of Dragon Pearl (1990)
- On the Edge (1991)
- One Step Beyond (1991)
- The Breaking Point (1991)
- The Commandments (1992)
- Vengeance (1992)
- The Thief of Time (1992)
- Royal Tramp (1992)
- Royal Tramp II (1992)
- All About Tin (1993)
- Heroes from Shaolin (1993)
- Class of 93 (1993)
- Legend of the Liquid Sword (1993)
- The Wild Lover (1994)
- Conscience (1994)
- A Good Match From Heaven (1995)
- Hope (1995)
- Outburst (1996)
- So Close (2001)
- Double Crossing (2001)
- Golden Faith (2002)
- Good Against Evil (2002)
- The Legend of Love (2002)
- Twin Sisters (2003)
- Heroes From The Dark (2003)
- At Dolphin Bay (2003)
- The Vigilante in the Mask (2004)
- Grey Coloured Road (2004)
- 100% Senorita (2004)
- Misleading Track (2005)
- Wu Guo Jie Xing Dong (2006)
- Li Wei Resigns from Office (2006)
- Da Qi Ying Xiong Zhuan (2007)
- Da Ming Yi Sheng Li Shi Zhen (2009)
- The Mystery of Death (2015)
- Dream Defender (2015)
- The Duke of Royal Tramp (2019)
- Once Upon a Time in China (2019)
- Blossoms Shanghai (2023–2024)

=== Variety show ===
- Call Me by Fire (season 2) (2022)
