= Pisces Jade Pendant =

The Pisces Jade Pendant is an urban legend within mainland China that attributes supernatural powers to a Pisces Jade Pendant found in the boundaries of the Lop Nur desert. It is often acknowledged as a meme by many users of the Chinese internet.

== Foundation ==
The myth is believed to have originated within the Tianya forums in 2009. It has several versions, but its origins lie within the mysterious disappearance of the Chinese scientist Peng Jiamu during the cold war era. The cold war era would see the testing of nuclear weapons by China over in the region, without disapproval from the Soviet Union. The pendant has been usually accepted as having the ability to interfere through space and time. A few versions of the myth involve time travel, but many of them revolve around the pendants supposed ability to replicate objects. The myth also inculcates the discovery of "Sand people" in the Xinjiang region during the era. Some interpretations of the myth believe that it had also been connected to disappearance of the "lost" Loulan kingdom.

== The legend ==
The legend revolves around the sand people in Xinjiang, who were found mentally ill with toxins and plants inside their body. The sand people were stated to have been in large numbers, and had been selling items "artifacts". The government was said to have recruited Peng Jiamu, who had been a renowned biologist to investigate the region after the cultural revolution. Nuclear testing with in the region during the period had been said to have been conducted to remove the undesired people. The pisces jade pendant was said to have been found during Pen's expedition, and was said to be named so because of it having replicated two fishes. It is said that Peng had replicated himself and went back to the Han dynasty period as Wang Mang, as he had passed similar reforms to the PRC.

== In culture ==
The myth has become very popular, as due to its inclusion of various themes, having multiple adaptations despite its humble BBS origin. The film The Mystery of Death, had adapted itself off of the legend from a web novel. It has been adapted into various films and web novels on platforms like Weibo.

== See also ==
- Peng Jiamu
- List of Chinese cultural relics forbidden to be exhibited abroad
