= Danny Chan =

Hong Kong singer (1958–1993)

Danny Chan 陳百強
- Chan in 1991
- Pronunciation: Chan Pak-Keung
- Born: Danny Chan Pak-Keung; 7 September 1958; Pok Fu Lam, British Hong Kong
- Died: 25 October 1993 (aged 35); Pok Fu Lam, British Hong Kong
- Burial place: Tseung Kwan O Chinese Permanent Cemetery, Hong Kong
- Citizenship: British (Hong Kong)
- Education: San Francisco Conservatory of Music (dropped out in sec 5)
- Occupations: Singer; songwriter
- Years active: 1979–1992
- Parent: Chan Pang-Fee (陳鵬飛)
- Awards: RTHK Golden Needle Award (lifetime achievement) – 2009 RTHK Top 10 Chinese Gold Songs Awards – 1979、1982、1983、1984、1986、1987、1988、1989 TVB Jade Solid Gold Best 10 Music Awards – 1983、1988、1989 Hong Kong Top 10 Best Dressed Personnel – 1987、1990
- Musical career
- Also known as: Junior Danny (丹尼仔); Little Goblin (小妖)
- Genre: Cantopop
- Instruments: Vocals; piano
- Labels: EMI (1979–1980); WEA (1980–1986, 1989–1992); DMI (1986–1988)

Chinese name
- Traditional Chinese: 陳百強
- Simplified Chinese: 陈百强
Transcriptions
Standard Mandarin
- Hanyu Pinyin: Chén Bǎiqiáng
Yue: Cantonese
- Jyutping: Can4 Baak3koeng4

Danny Chan Pak-Keung (simplified Chinese: 陈百强; traditional Chinese: 陳百強; pinyin: Chén Bǎiqiáng; 7 September 1958 – 25 October 1993) was a Hong Kong singer, songwriter and actor. One of the first Cantopop idols in Hong Kong, he gained fame alongside performers Alan Tam, Anita Mui, and Leslie Cheung, who were collectively known as "Three Kings and a Queen" (三王一后) or "Tam Cheung Mui Chan" (譚張梅陳) in the 1980s. He is best remembered for such songs as "Waiting" (等), "Life Expectations" (一生何求), "Ripples" (漣漪), "Loving You Alone" (偏偏喜歡你) and "Cherish Tonight" (今宵多珍重).

== Early life and career ==
Chan was born on 7 September 1958 at Queen Mary Hospital in Pok Fu Lam (薄扶林). His father, Chan Pang-Fee (Chinese: 陳鵬飛; 1923 – 5 April 2019), a businessman in the watch industry, was fond of Cantonese opera and became one of his son's musical influences.

During his childhood, Chan developed a passion for music and mostly learnt to play organ keyboard and piano by himself. He was an alumnus of St. Paul's Co-educational College and also a classmate of lyricist Andrew Lam Man Chung (林敏驄).

Chan won third prize at the TVB "Hong Kong Pop Song Writing Invitation" in 1977 with his self-written English song "The Rocky Road". In 1978, he won first prize at the Hong Kong Yamaha Electone Festival by playing the theme music of the movie Close Encounters of the Third Kind. This earned him his singing contract with Hong Kong Television Broadcasts (TVB) and officially launched his entertainment career. In that same year, he made his acting debut with HK TVB through a TV drama called Sweet Babe (甜姐兒).

Chan's musical talent attracted the attention of artist manager Tam Kwok-Gei (譚國基). Tam signed Chan under his artist management agency, Hollywood Casting Agency (HCA), and subsequently had Chan sign a recording contract with EMI. Chan's first music album, First Love, was released in 1979. His self-composed song on the album, "Tears for You" (眼淚為你流), was an instant hit.

Chan subsequently signed music contracts with Hong Kong EMI (1979), WEA (1980), DMI (1986), and finally moved back to WEA (1989). His Cantopop romance ballads achieved high levels of public success and critical acclaim, some of which are still popular such as "Waiting" (等), "Life Expectations" (一生何求), "Ripples" (漣漪), "Loving You Alone" (偏偏喜歡你), "Cherish Tonight" (今宵多珍重), "Deeply in Love with You" (深愛著你), "Having You" (有了你), "Misty Rain" (煙雨悽迷), "Applause" (喝采), and "Minutes' Date" (幾分鐘的約會). The song "Remembrance on Parents' Love" (念親恩) is often played on radio stations and frequently chosen for karaoke.

Chan's first five albums were produced by Tam Kwok-Gei, and the song concepts were mostly targeted towards youth. Chan composed a large quantity of songs during this period. From the sixth album, Pouring Out My Heart (傾訴), onward, Chan started to produce albums himself. He reached his first peak in his musical career with this album and the next one, Loving You Alone (偏偏喜歡你), where the album sales achieved five platinum certifications (250,000 copies) in Hong Kong.

In 1984, he sang an English duet "Tell Me What Can I Do" with American country music singer Crystal Gayle. It was produced in the US and released in both the US and Japan, but was largely unknown due to lack of promotional budget. Meanwhile, he also covered Jim Capaldi's ballad "Warm" with an improved music arrangement.

In the early 1980s, Chan was a host in the TV show Bang Bang Sound (Bang Bang咁嘅聲). His co-operation with Leslie Cheung and Paul Chung in the films Encore (1980) (喝采) and On Trial (1981) (失業生), received positive reception from the public and media. He is the main character in HK TVB TV series Breakthrough (1982) (突破) together with his favourite female partner Mary Jean Reimer (翁靜晶). His sole comedy film Merry Christmas (1984) (聖誕快樂) was a huge box office success. He is also one of the main characters in one of Hong Kong's most famous romantic film from the 1980s, An Autumn's Tale (1987) (秋天的童話), as Vincent, with Chow Yun-fat and Cherie Chung.

During the span of his musical career, Chan held many music concerts in Hong Kong, China, Japan, Singapore, Malaysia, Australia, Thailand, Canada and the United States. He held his first major local concert at the Queen Elizabeth Stadium in July 1982 (2 nights), and another concert in the newly developed Hong Kong Stadium in September 1983 (2 nights), both of which were organised by Brainchild Productions (富才制作). From this time on, all of his major concerts were held in Hong Kong Stadium. His avant-garde concept January 1985 concerts (3 nights) were organised by Capitol Artists Entertainment (華星娛樂), but was met with underwhelming feedback. Warm critical acclaims was received in the Dickson Entertainment (迪生娛樂) organised concerts in December 1986 (2 nights) and April 1988 (4 nights). His 10th anniversary concerts in September/October 1989 (6 nights), and the purple themed concerts in March 1991 (3 nights) were organised by Yiu Wing Entertainment (耀榮娛樂).

Chan also participated and represented Hong Kong in various music festivals, such as the World Popular Song Festival 1984 in Tokyo, the Nagasaki Asia Music Festival 1988 in Japan, Peace Music Concert 1988 in Singapore, Tokyo Music Festival 1989 and the Shanghai Music Festival Warner Music Special Concert 1991. He was also invited to perform at the 1988 Seoul Summer Olympic Games opening ceremony. In 1986, he performed in the presence of The Royal Thai princess in a Thai charity show.

In 1991, Chan announced his decision to leave the Hong Kong music industry. He had planned to hold several farewell concerts in the US, Canada and Hong Kong, but his sudden descent into a coma in May 1992 halted such plans.

== Death ==
Chan suffered from mild depression, which worsened during the late 1980s.

On 18 May 1992, Chan was found unconscious and he was admitted to Queen Mary Hospital in Hong Kong. Chan had suffered from advanced brain damage. It was speculated that this was due to drug use. He went into a coma for almost a year and a half and died on 25 October 1993 at the age of 35. He was buried at Tseung Kwan O Chinese Permanent Cemetery.

== Legacy ==
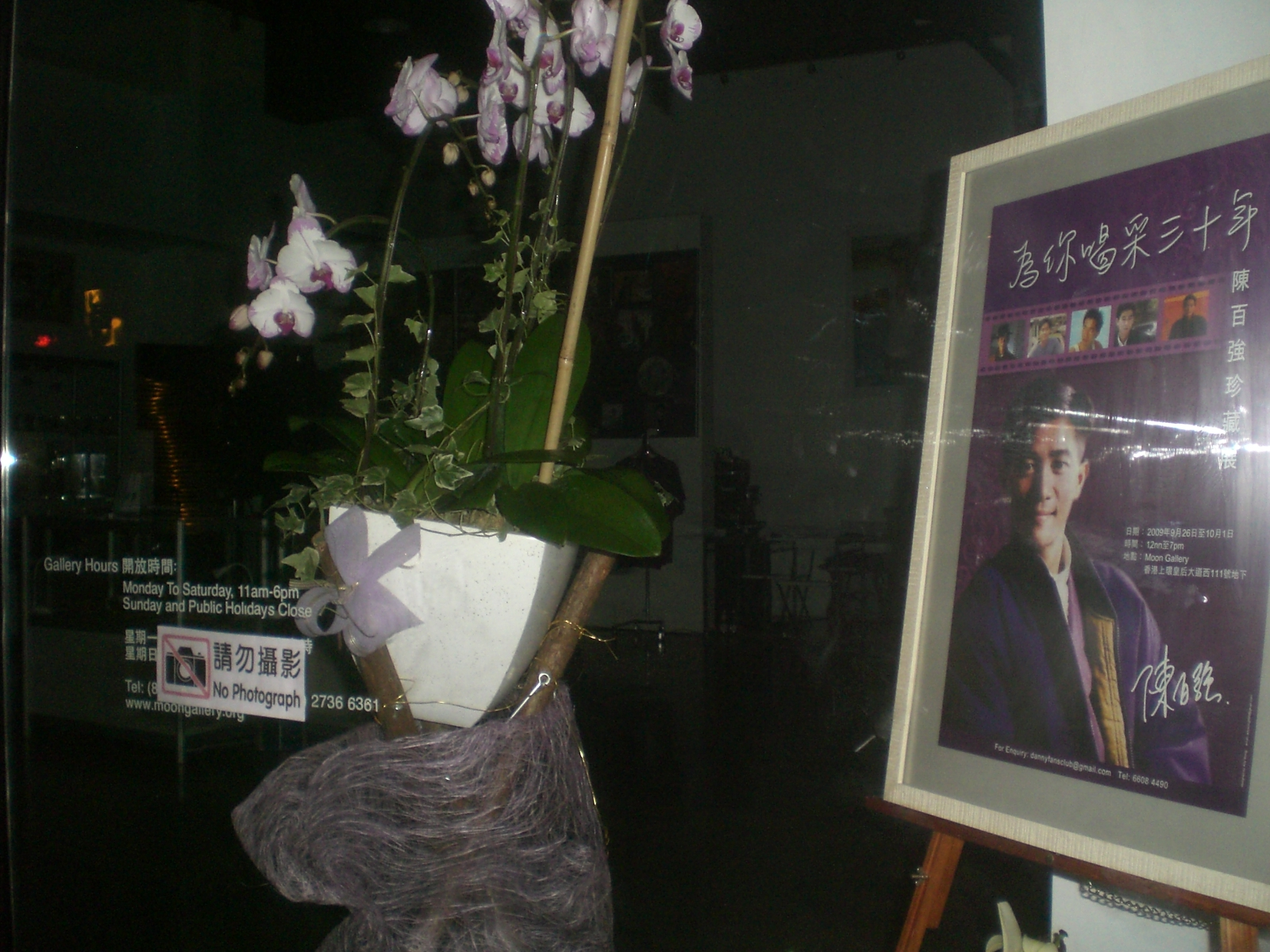
An exhibition held in September 2009 in memory of Danny Chan.

On 26 October 1993, the day after Chan's passing, Commercial Radio organized a 90-minute memorial concert at Queen Elizabeth Stadium. Those who attended the video concert included Kenny Bee, Elisa Chan, Liu Fong, Sam Tsang, Yu Sin-man, and members of the pop music group City Beat. Sounds of weeping were heard throughout the performance, with the venue at some moments falling completely silent. During the concert, Kenny Bee stated: "We have lost one of our best musicians. It is a show for Danny; but, he could not turn up tonight... I hope he could still feel our love."

On 22 October 1995, Chan's father, Chan Pang-Fee, sponsored and built the Danny Commemoration Pavilion (陳百強紀念館) in his ancestoral hometown Sijiu Town, Taishan City, Guangdong Province, China (中國廣東省台山市四九鎮).

On 8 November 2005, the Hong Kong Post issued a set of special stamps featuring "Hong Kong Pop Singers". This stamp set honoured five Hong Kong pop stars who have left their mark on Cantopop music history, with Chan being featured on the HK$1.80 stamp.

== Discography ==
=== Studio albums ===
List of studio albums, showing release year and month, label and Chan's compositions on the albums
Title	Released	Label	Chan's compositions
First Love	September 1979	EMI	"First Love" (English) "Rocky Road" (English) "Tears for You" (眼淚為你流) "Two in Love" (两心痴) (lyrics only)
Vanished Tears (不再流淚)	March 1980	EMI	"Vanished Tears" (不再流淚) "Dreamed About You Last Night" (昨夜夢見你) "First Love" (初戀)
Minutes' Date (幾分鐘的約會)	December 1980	WEA	"Applause" (喝采) "Flying Out" (飛出去) "I Love White Clouds" (我愛白雲) "Memory Book" (紀念冊) "A Cheerful Ugly Duck" (快樂的醜小鴨)
Having You (有了你)	June 1981	WEA	"Footprints on the Beach" (沙灘中的腳印) "Outside the School Gates" (校門外) "Sunflower" (太陽花) "A Happy Embrace" (快樂的擁抱) "An Excerpt" (片段)
Breakthrough Collections (突破精選) (with 2 new songs)	May 1982	WEA	"Ripples" (漣漪)
Pouring Out My Heart (傾訴)	December 1982	WEA	"Pouring Out My Heart" (傾訴)
Loving You Alone (偏偏喜歡你)	August 1983	WEA	"Loving You Alone" (偏偏喜歡你) "Wave" (浪潮)
Danny '84 (百強84)	July 1984	WEA	
Tell Me What Can I Do (English single)	November 1984	WEA	
Danny: The Greatest Hits (陳百強精選) (with 4 new songs)	January 1985	WEA	"Waiting" (等)
Deeply in Love with You (深愛著你)	4 July 1985	WEA	"Love Expectancy" (盼望的緣份) "Love Prediction" (戀愛預告)
When I Think of You (當我想起你)	16 May 1986	WEA	
Idol Danny's Remix (偶像陳百強Remix)	30 July 1986	WEA	
Gazing (凝望)	12 September 1986	DMI	"Gazing" (凝望)
Hidden Infatuation (痴心眼內藏)	23 January 1987	DMI	"Balderdash" (夢囈)
Dream Lover (夢裡人)	10 August 1987	DMI	"Dream Lover" (夢裡人) "My Story" (我的故事)
The Immortals' Migration (神仙也移民)	2 February 1988	DMI	"Endless Expectancy" (漫長盼望)
Silence Expresses More (無聲勝有聲)	3 August 1988	DMI	
Winter's Warmth (冬暖)	13 December 1988	DMI	"Lighting Up True Love" (燃點真愛) (co-composed with Dominic Chow Kai Sheng 周啟生)
Life Expectations (一生何求)	7 June 1989	WEA	
Waiting for You (等待您)	January 1990	WEA	"Singing with Wine" (對酒當歌) (transcribed from "12 Hours" 十二小時)
Danny's '90 Romance Ballads (陳百強90浪漫心曲經典) (with 1 new song)	July 1990	WEA	
Love in L.A.	18 January 1991	WEA	"Feelings of Loneliness" (寂寞的感覺)
Because I Love You (只因愛你)	10 September 1991	WEA	"A Vocalist's Love Song" (歌者戀歌) "Love Is Close" (而情是近) (co-composed with Alan Tsui Yat Kan 徐日勤)
My Dear: The Collections (親愛的您) (with 3 new songs)	October 1992	WEA	

=== Other compositions ===
- 1978, "The Sunrise" (English), unreleased
- 1980, "Tears in Tears" (淚中淚), a song by Wong Hoi Yan (黃愷欣)
- 1981, "Cherish Me" (為我珍重), a song by Blanche Tang Oi Lam (鄧藹霖)
- 1984, "Love Prediction" (戀愛預告), a song by Sandy Lamb (林姍姍)
- 1987, "Love Without Reasons" (愛不問為何), a song by Roman Tam (罗文)
- 1988, "12 Hours" (十二小時), a song by Samantha Lam (林志美)

== Filmography ==
=== Films ===
- 1980, Encore (喝采)
- 1981, On Trial / Job Hunter (失業生)
- 1984, Merry Christmas (聖誕快樂)
- 1986, My Family (八喜臨門)
- 1987, An Autumn's Tale (秋天的童話) a.k.a. Chau tin tik tung wa (Hong Kong Cantonese title); a.k.a. Liumang daheng (流氓大亨) (Taiwan Mandarin title)

=== TV dramas ===
- 1977, Sweet Babe (甜姐兒) (produced by HK TVB)
- 1980, Take Turn (輪流轉) (produced by HK TVB)
- 1980, Breakthrough (突破) (produced by HK TVB)

== Concerts ==
=== Major concerts ===
Title	Date	Night(s)	Venue	Organizer(s)
Danny '82 Concert (陳百強82演唱會)	3–4 July 1982	2	Queen Elizabeth Stadium	Brainchild Productions (富才制作)
Danny '83 Concert (陳百強83演唱會)	10–11 September 1983	2	Hong Kong Coliseum	Brainchild Productions (富才制作)
Danny '85 Concert (陳百強85演唱會)	12–14 January 1985	3	Hong Kong Stadium	Capitol Artists Entertainment (華星娛樂); Yiu Wing Entertainment (耀榮娛樂)
Danny '86 Ongoing Concert (陳百強86前進演唱會)	6–7 December 1986	2	Hong Kong Stadium	Dickson Entertainment (迪生娛樂)
Danny '88 Keep True Concert (陳百強88存真演唱會)	1–4 April 1988	4	Hong Kong Coliseum	Dickson Entertainment (迪生娛樂)
Danny '89 10th Anniversary Concert (陳百強89十週年紀念演唱會)	29 September-8 October 1989	6	Hong Kong Coliseum	Yiu Wing Entertainment (耀榮娛樂)
Danny '91 Purple Individual Concert (陳百強91紫色個體演唱會)	29–31 March 1991	3	Hong Kong Coliseum	Yiu Wing Entertainment (耀榮娛樂); Capitol Artists Entertainment (華星娛樂)

== Awards ==
=== Music awards ===
Year	RTHK Top 10 Chinese Gold Songs Awards	TVB Jade Solid Gold Best 10 Music Awards	Other music contests
1977			"Hong Kong Yamaha Electone Festival"; 3rd TVB "Hong Kong Pop Song Writing Invitation"; 3rd (The Rocky Road)
1978			"Hong Kong Yamaha Electone Festival"; Champion; TVB "Hong Kong Pop Song Writing Invitation"; 3rd (The Sunrise)
1979	Tears for You (眼淚為你流)		
1982	Ripples (漣漪)	Ripples (漣漪) (Yr 81-82)	
1983	Loving You Alone (偏偏喜歡你)	Cherish Tonight (今宵多珍重) [AGB Most Popular Song of the Year]	
1984	Reaching for the Stars (摘星)		"World Popular Song Festival", Tokyo; The Most Charming Award
1986	Gazing (凝望)		
1987	My Story (我的故事)		
1988	Misty Rain (煙雨悽迷)	Misty Rain (煙雨悽迷)	CRHK "Most Popular Male Singer"; Bronze
1989	Life Expectations (一生何求)	Life Expectations (一生何求)	CRHK "Most Popular Male Singer"; Bronze "Tokyo Music Festival"; TBS Award
1991			"Top 10 Most Popular Singers"; Guangzhou, China
1999	"Best Commercial Song Award"; Ripples (漣漪)▲		
2009	"Golden Needle Award" (lifetime achievement)		

▲ In 1999, the song "Ripples" (漣漪) was used by the Hong Kong Government in a commercial clip for Tracker Fund of Hong Kong IPO.

=== Other awards ===
1981, "Model Youth" in Wong Tai Sin District, Hong Kong
1986, "Hong Kong's Top 10 Most Popular Celebrities" by Radio Television Hong Kong
1987, "Hong Kong's Top 10 Best Dressed Personnel" by Hong Kong Fashion Designers Association
1989, "Hong Kong's Top 10 Good-Looking Personnel" by Commercial Radio Hong Kong
1990, "Hong Kong's Top 10 Best Dressed Personnel" by Hong Kong Fashion Designers Association
