= China Scholarship Council =

Ministry of Education body

- 国家留学基金委员会
- Formation: 1996; 30 years ago
- Headquarters: Beijing
- Parent organization: Ministry of Education
- Website: www.csc.edu.cn

The China Scholarship Council (CSC; Chinese: 国家留学基金委员会) is China's Ministry of Education body that provides support for international academic exchanges with the country and is the primary vehicle through which the Chinese government awards scholarships. CSC provides both funding for Chinese citizens and residents to study abroad, and for foreign students and scholars to study in China. The agency predominantly provides scholarships to individuals, including in batches allocated to specific foreign universities.

The CSC funds a number of Chinese students studying abroad every year, and the same number of international students in China. CSC also manages the National Construction High-Level University Postgraduate Program scholarship, which funds a number of graduate students each year. Moreover, the CSC's elite-track funding mechanism for foreign exchange is the International Cooperative Program for Innovative Talents (ICPIT) program, which funds hundreds of special training programs arising from collaborations between top Chinese and international institutions.

Among its most well-known scholarship programs, the CSC manages the Chinese government award for outstanding self-financed students abroad, which funds about 650 students each year (500 before 2021), these scholarships are designed to encourage Chinese students to return home after completing their studies.

== History ==
The State Council of the People's Republic of China first proposed the CSC in 1994, before its establishment in 1996. Due to the mid-1990s emphasis on urbanization of China, the CSC offered full support for urban economics doctoral students studying overseas.

=== National security concerns ===
In August 2020, the University of North Texas terminated its relationship with the China Scholarship Council, citing security concerns.

In October 2020, a United States–China Economic and Security Review Commission report noted that certain CSC scholarships require that recipients "support the leadership of the Communist Party and the path of socialism with Chinese characteristics; love the motherland; have a sense of responsibility to serve the country, society, and the people; and to have a correct world view, outlook on life, and values system."

In January 2023, Swedish newspaper Dagens Nyheter reported that Chinese students studying in Sweden and funded by CSC had been required to sign loyalty pledges to the Chinese Communist Party and name guarantors to repay scholarships if the pledges are violated. Radio Free Asia subsequently reported that this practice had been happening for at least a decade and involved tens of thousands of Chinese students studying abroad.

In November 2023, The Daily Telegraph was reported that CSC scholarship recipients were required to receive Chinese Communist Party "ideological training" before entering the United Kingdom.

In July 2025, the United States House Select Committee on Strategic Competition between the United States and the Chinese Communist Party urged seven U.S. universities to cut ties with the program, including Dartmouth College and the University of Notre Dame, citing national security concerns.

== See also ==
- Thousand Talents Plan
