= International Cooperative Program for Innovative Talents =

Chinese government program

The International Cooperative Program for Innovative Talents (ICPIT) mechanism is the top-level international educational exchange program for higher education of the Ministry of Education of the People's Republic of China. The ICPIT program is administered by the China Scholarship Council.

== Scope ==
The ICPIT program was established in 2014 with the objective of supporting China's objectives of technology development and of building top-tier interdisciplinary educational programs. Training in innovation is a special focus. The program supports China's aim of developing select universities and disciplines through the Double First-Class Construction. The strategy calls for collaboration with "world class" academic institutions, research laboratories, and research institutions beyond China.

== Selection ==
ICPIT proposals involve collaboration between a Chinese university and foreign entity, and are limited to one proposal per Chinese university. Universities being part of the Double First-Class Construction are permitted a total of three applications per year. In 2018, the Chinese Ministry of Education funded a total of 29 ICPIT programs.

== See also ==
- Thousand Talents Plan
