= Susie Au =

Hong Kong film director

Susie Au Suet-yee
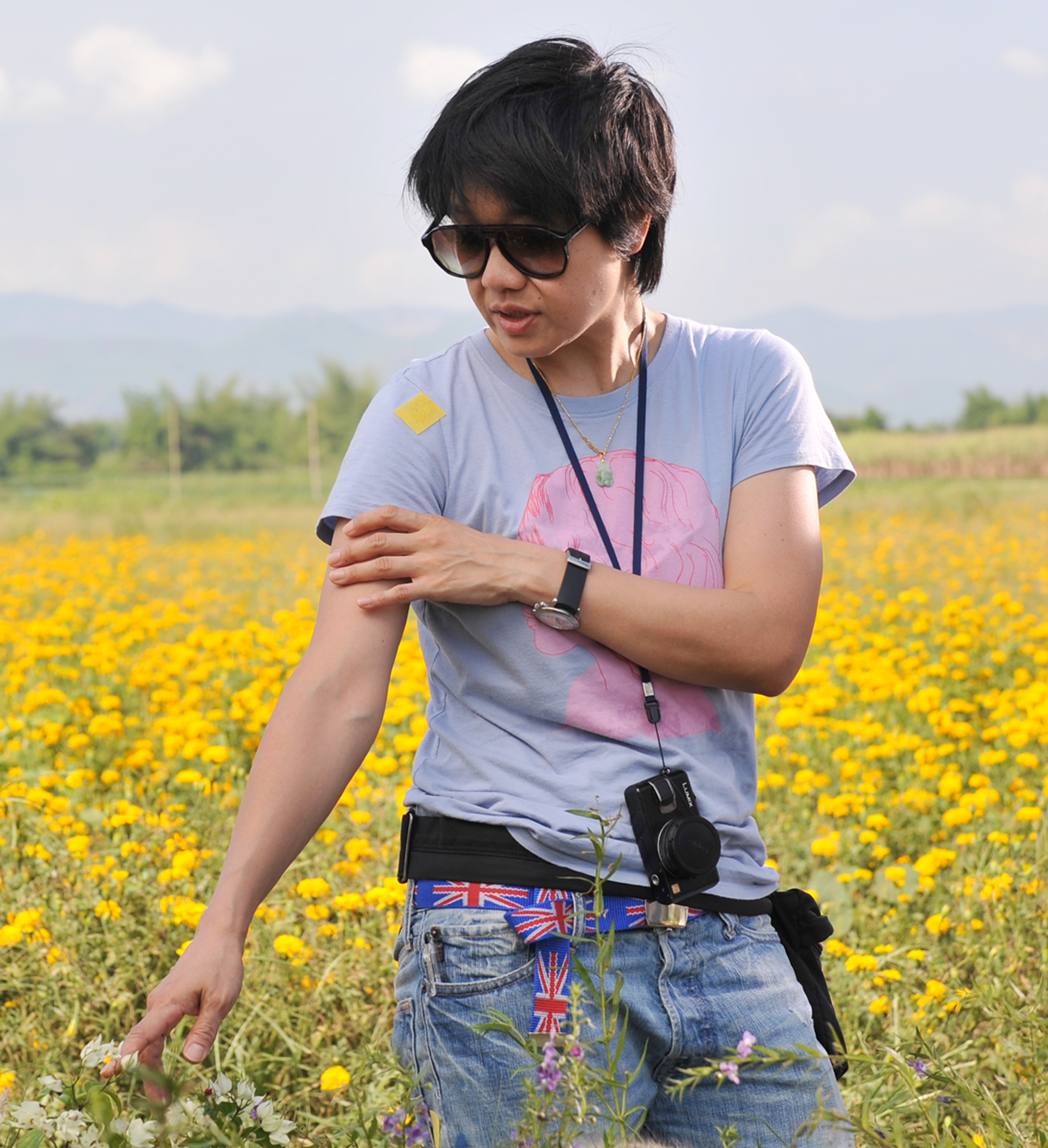
- Born: Hong Kong
- Education: State University of New York
- Occupations: Director, multi-installation artist, photographer, theatre director
- Years active: 1993–present

Susie Au Suet-yee (simplified Chinese: 区雪儿; traditional Chinese: 區雪兒), is a film-maker and versatile based in Hong Kong. Her works include T.V. commercials, music videos, feature films, documentaries and multi-installations.

She is noted for her stunning visual styles. She innovates electrifying exotic imagery that has stormed the music video field and the karaoke pubs in the region. Her work in music videos has earned her comparisons with Western contemporaries; "Au is Hong Kong's answer to the likes of American director Spike Jonze (Adaptation.) and Michel Gondry (Eternal Sunshine of the Spotless Mind) from France."

Susie lives in Hong Kong, Beijing, Berlin, San Francisco. Besides making advertising films, music videos, she is writing films; feature and short. Still striving to work outside of the box, as creative director, photographer, installation artist and theatre director.

She states,

Wherever I am, I film with my movie camera.
Whenever I don't have the movie camera, I film with my still camera.
My indulgence is to create images that evoke and provoke.
To create dreams and to recreate the reality.

== Early life and education ==
Susie Au studied film-making at the State University of New York. She had directed short films in different genres during her stay in New York such as Among Fragments, Moon Chase, The Dream In New Orleans etc. She returned to Hong Kong with her awarded short film, To Hide and Seek.

== Career ==
=== Music videos ===
She has directed over one hundred music videos and has been a long-time collaborator with popular musician Faye Wong (王菲) and alternative pop singer Anthony Wong (黃耀明). Other artists who have collaborated with Susie on more than one occasion include best album selling pop singers; Jacky Cheung (張學友), Eason Chan (陳奕迅), Andy Lau (劉德華), Joey Yung (容祖兒), Jeff Chang (張信哲), Miriam Yeung (楊千嬅), Grasshopper (草蜢), Mavis Fan (范曉萱), F4, Ellen Loo (盧凱彤), Tam Wai Wai (譚維維), Shirley Kwan (關淑怡), Ivana Wong (王苑之), Kary Ng (吳雨霏) and more.

Her works with Anthony Wong and Faye Wong won her gold awards from the Chicago International Film Festival. Faye Wong's Half Way (半途而廢) won the MTV Video Music Award. Mavis Fan's Why, Jeff Chang's True Love (用情) and Jacky Cheung's Web of Love (情網) were nominated for the Best Music Video of the year.

Susie is now taken as the region's M.V. guru, her visual style is noted for being feminine, and romantic. Also, most of the videos have become the region's karaoke classic; mass culture.

=== Films ===
Susie founded Handmade Films to diversify her visual adventure in different forms. She started directing T.V. commercials; mostly about contemporary women's life-style and fashion-oriented. Not only is Susie a rare female director in the region, she is also the first Chinese director to direct Christian Dior's first-launched T.V.C. in the China market.

Susie states her ambition is to create and recreate, enjoys filming on the set and never gets bored in the editing suite. Among all other projects, she inspired the music industry to create various music projects; Susie is a pioneer in music documentaries, collaborating with musicians to create innovative visuals for concerts and experimental films.

In 2005, Susie made a forty-five-minute musical film Moon Wall (牆前明月光); produced by now.com.hk, starring Karena Lam (林嘉欣) and Rebecca Pan (潘迪華). Written by GC Goo-Bi, music by Peter Kam (金培達). The film premiered at United Artist Cinema at Langham.

In 2007, Susie made her first feature debut Ming Ming, starring Zhou Xun (周迅), Daniel Wu (吳彥祖) and Tony Yang (楊祐寧). The film selected to be screened in Pusan, Hong Kong, Taiwan and Shanghai International Film Festival, the film gets reviewed as "Run Lola Run meets new generation's wuxia… "; "Ming Ming's world, one which contains fantasy martial arts elements, the magical realism which set in today's contemporary era." Ming Ming was released in China, Hong Kong and Taipei simultaneously. The film marked an unusual independent film effort to create a China-Hong Kong-Taiwan alliance before the huge film market developed.

In 2008, Susie directed a 45-minute short titled Moving On, in which the scene of Eason Chan casually humming along the abandoned back in fact expanding on the director's continual themes on nostalgic and alienated emotion to Hong Kong.

In 2010, collaborating with pop legend Faye Wong, Susie created a music documentary titled Faye Reborn.

In 2011, Susie was invited by mainstream director Jeff Lau (劉鎮偉) to be the music director for East Meets West 2011 (東成西說 2011). Not only Susie directed a few musical scenes, she has revived the classic songs for film and created an emotional sound track.

In 2012, Susie directed and scripted Beauty University (美麗大學); starring Shu Qi (舒淇). It is the story written about contemporary Chinese women. It is rarely found in China viro on short drama driven by visuals than dialogue. The film is a visual meditation on the values of modern living and marriage. It is well received in China during the launch.

In 2013, Susie is invited by Juno Mak (麥俊龍) to direct the music video of "Poison Love" with Zombie Boy (Rick Genest).

In 2014, Susie focused on developing her feature film scripts and installation art projects.

In 2015, her new film project Crazy Girls Dancing Club (working title) was selected by Medienboard Berlin-Brandenburg and invited as a resident artist in Berlin.

In 2016, Susie was invited to Berlin by Nipkow Programme as artist in residence to create TV series. In this year, Susie also created and directed a multimedia-dance-theatre Utopia, Momentarily. Partnering with lyricist Chow Yiu Fai (周耀輝) and musician Vicky Fung Wing Ki (馮穎琪), the project was sponsored by Hong Kong New Vision Arts Festival, after one and half year's endeavour, Utopia, Momentarily launched in Kwai Ching Theatre in November 2016. Not only pop singers like Anthony Wong (黃耀明), Juno Mak (麥俊龍), Eman Lam (林二汶) and Yoyo Sham (岑寧兒) were invited to perform the songs, the project involved many first endeavours for the festival. Not only Susie is the theatre director, she also created and designed all the visuals for the project. Utopia, Momentarily was highly acclaimed from both the pop and theatre field.

In 2024, Susie released her second feature film written and directed by herself, She Fell to Earth, which was nominated for the Tiger Competition at the 53rd International Film Festival Rotterdam. The story follows OM, a mysterious alien who accidentally crashes into a quiet town filled with dreamers. Knowing nothing about Earth, she is driven solely by a longing to explore the unique human "heart"—that precious vessel for joy, anger, sorrow, and delight. Armed with invisible superpowers, OM embarks on a whimsical, fantastic adventure.

== Filmography ==
=== Film ===
Year	Title	Role	Artist	Genre	Note
2024	She Fell to Earth	Director & Scriptwriter		Feature Film	Selected for Tiger Competition at the 53rd International Film Festival Rotterdam
2013	Poison Love	Director	Juno Mak, Zombie Boy	Experimental Film	
2012	Beauty University	Director, Scriptwriter	Shu Qi	Short Drama	
2012	Faye Reborn	Director	Faye Wong	Music Documentary	
2011	East Meets West 2011	Music Director	Eason Chan, Karen Mok and Kenny B	Musical Feature	
2008	Moving On	Director	Eason Chan	Music Documentary	
2008	Les Dancer	Director		Short Documentary	Commissioned by a Hong Kong local fashion brand Bread n Butter
2007	Duo	Director	Eason Chan	Music Documentary	
2007	Ming Ming	Director	Zhou Xun, Daniel Wu and Tony Yang	Feature Film	Selected for I see it my way series in the 31st Hong Kong International Film Festival and was officially screened in China, Hong Kong and Taiwan.
2007	Two Women, One Heart	Director	Chan Fai Young	Experimental Film	For 12 Faces of Women Concert
2004	Moon Wall	Director	Karena Lam and Rebecca Pan	Musical Film	Commissioned by now.com.hk
2004	Fable 4:30pm	Director		Short Drama	Selected by PPP (Pusan Promotion Plan)
1995	Merry Christmas	Director	Faye Wong	Music Documentary	
1993	To Hide and Seek	Director		Short Drama	Selected by the 16th Hong Kong International Film Festival

=== Visual / Performance Direction work ===
Year	Title	Collaboration	Role
2026	"Off the Boundary"	Zuni Icosahedron	Visual & Performance Director
2026	"Walk-in Cinema of Moving Image Memory"	Art Central	Visual & Performance Director
2018	"Silent Emotion" with Bruno Walpoth	Hangzhou Arts Museum	Video Installation Artist
2017	"World in Daze, Woman in Wind"	Artopia Gallery (Beijing)	Photographer, Multi-Installation Artist
2016	Utopia, Momentarily Multimedia Theatre	Chow Yiu Fai, Vicky Fung Wing Ki, Anthony Wong, Juno Mak, Eman Lam and Yoyo Sham	Theatre Director, Visual Director, Multi-Installation Artist
2013	Out of the Box on Juno Mak, Renaissance Man on SK Lam, King of the Toy on Michael Lau	Elle Men	Creative Director/ Photographer
2012	Jacky Cheung 1/2 Century World Tour	Jacky Cheung	Multi-Installation Artist
2012	Turn On the Concert	Tat Ming Pair	Film Director, Multi-Installation Artist
2008	Artists Series - Les Dancer	Bread n Butter	Photographer
2007	Tian Tian Xiang Shang Comic Exhibition in Shanghai	Danny Yung (榮念曾)	Video Installation Artist
2007	Music Adventure – Ming Ming X Susie Au Music Journey	Hennessy And Times Square	Installation Artist
2006	HA! Read MV!	Basheer Design Books HK, Agnes b, Sony	Video Installation Artist
1997	Toy	Faye Wong	Album Cover Photographer

== Awards and nominations ==
=== Music videos ===
Year	Song	Artist	Awards and Nominations
2008	Why	Mavis Fan	Nominated for the Best MTV-19th Annual Taiwan GMA
1998	Don't Bother	Faye Wong	Best MTV of the Year - Metro City Radio Station Pop Songs Awards Best MTV of the Year - Taiwan Channel V MTV Awards
1997	True Love	Jeff Chang	Nominated for the Best MTV of Asia - MTV Channel
1996	Di-Dar	Faye Wong	Winner of Silver Plaque Award - The 32nd Chicago International Film Festival Music Video Awards
1996	Before the Sunrise	Anthony Wong	Winner of Merit Award - The 32nd Chicago International Film Festival Music Video Awards
1994	Love of No Night	Anthony Wong	Winner of Gold Plaque Award - The 30th Chicago International Film Festival Music Video Awards
1993	You and I	Annie Leung	Winner of the Golden Plaque Award - The CCTV Annual MTV Awards
1993	Web of Love	Jacky Cheung	Nominated for the Best MTV of Asia - MTV Channel

=== TV commercials ===
Year	Title	Client	Awards and Nominations
2007	As Tears Go By	Haier	Mobius Award
2007	Small S, My attitude	Clear shampoo	Effie Award for Best Performance
2003	Gor Yin Hai - "P.E. Class"	Vita	Hong Kong 4As Creative Awards, Merit Award for the Best Single TV Commercial - Alcoholic/Non-Alcoholic Beverage
2003	Gor Yin Hai - "P.E. Class"	Vita	11th Times International Chinese Advertising Awards, Silver Award - Non-Alcoholic Beverage
2003	Gor Yin Hai - "Basketball"	Vita	11th Times International Chinese Advertising Awards, Silver Award - Non-Alcoholic Beverage
2001	Hot Vitasoy - "Cold Orange"	Vita	Hong Kong 4As Creative Awards, Silver Award for the Best Single TV Commercial - Alcoholic/Non-Alcoholic Beverage
2001	$8 Promotion	McDonald's	Hong Kong 4As Creative Awards, Silver Award for the Best TV Campaign
1998	Imagery	Bank of East Asia	Hong Kong 4As Creative Awards, Finalist for the Banking/Financial TV Commercial
