= Eman Lam =

Hong Kong singer-songwriter

- Born: 林意汶; 25 October 1982 (age 43); British Hong Kong
- Occupation: Singer-songwriter
- Years active: 2002–present
- Musical career
- Origin: Hong Kong
- Genres: Pop; folktronica
- Instruments: Vocals, guitar
- Label: Smallmslam

Chinese name
- Chinese: 林二汶
Transcriptions
Standard Mandarin
- Hanyu Pinyin: Lín Èrwèn
Yue: Cantonese
- Jyutping: Lam^{4} Yi^{6}man^{4}

Eman Lam Yee-man (Chinese: 林二汶, born 25 October 1982) is a Hong Kong singer and songwriter. Lam and Ellen Joyce Loo were part of the vocal duo at17.

In contrast with Ellen Joyce Loo (who had been writing songs which incline more toward Cantopop), Lam's songs seem to show an inclination toward more varieties of styles including folk, jazz, and blues.

== Early life ==
Lam is the younger sister of Hong Kong-based singer-songwriter and musician Chet Lam. She began performing music early in life.

== Career ==
She sang in some of the song demos composed by Chet Lam, which gained her initial attention from music production company People Mountain People Sea's director Anthony Wong Yiu Ming.

In 2000, Lam met Ellen Joyce Loo at "Original Music 2000" (原音2000), a singing competition in Hong Kong. Lam had placed second whereas Loo had placed third. After the competition, she started performing with Loo at university campuses and tertiary institutions.

The team again drew attention from Wong, who decided to sign them under his music production company, People Mountain People Sea, in 2002 and later became at17. They held their first large scale concert "Sing Sing Sing 2006" at AsiaWorld–Expo.

She made her solo debut in 2012.

Her second solo album, On the Go, was released in 2014. It is Lam's first project recorded in Mandarin.

Lam voiced Joy in the Cantonese dub of Inside Out (2015).

at17 reunited in 2017 for the "Girls Girls Girls Live in Concert".

== Personal life ==
Lam and her brother Chet established the charitable institution "Lam 12 Charity Fun" in 2012.

== Filmography ==
- Stars Academy (2022)
- My Prince Edward (2019)
- House of Wolves (film) (2016)
- Golden Chicken 3 (2014)
- Hello Babies (2014)
- East Meets West 2011 (2011)
- A Simple Life (2011)
