= MusicBee (crowdfunding) =

Hong Kong music crowdfunding platform

MusicBee is a crowdfunding platform focused on independent music based in Hong Kong. The company stated its mission as to gather resources and help bring independent music projects into life, providing musicians with dreams and opportunities. MusicBee has reportedly received $2 million funding over 15 music projects within one year.

People who back MusicBee projects would be offered different tangible or intangible rewards designed by the project owner, such as mp3 links, tangible CDs, souvenirs, and private concerts.

== History ==
MusicBee was launched in February 2015, by artists Chet Lam Yat Fung, Fung Wing Ki Vicky, Tse Kwok Wai Victor. Musicbee reportedly raised $2 million since its launch from supporters, including the general public as well as commercial brands Levi's, Sony, Doughnut, Dr Martens, Eipiphone and MOOV.

Founder Chet Lam served as the editor of the site; accordingly, the hardworking musicians are like bees, such that the platform was named MusicBee in order to help the musician to gain honey.

== Model ==
MusicBee gathers money from public donors to virtually sponsor local independent artists via its crowdfunding space. Donors can support artists or musical categories, and popularize music they appreciate, which may not appeal to mainstream commercial industries. MusicBee operates similar to the American-based crowdfunding platform Kickstarter, which currently does not offer its services to Hong Kong artists, MusicBee aims to be an alternative outlet for local artists.

To launch a fundraising campaign, artists submit a creative proposal along with a deadline for the funding goal to MusicBee. There is no limit to the funding goal, but if the goal is not met by the set deadline, the project will not be funded. The "all or nothing" policy acts to balance the interest of artists and risks of donors, by encouraging donors to familiarize with the project before donating. Donors could do so through the Chat Bubble function on the site.

The process throughout the project’s publication is free of charge. A 15% administration fee, that is subject to change, will only be charged on successful fundraising campaigns; applicants who failed to reach the set funding goal will not be charged of said fee. MusicBee supports payment by credit card, Alipay or PayPal. Success is not guaranteed, but successful artists could provide donors with their products or discounts as equities for their donation.

MusicBee does not partake in the project itself, nor does it have creative control over artists. It reserves right to examine all proposals before accepting the application, some criteria being the project’s feasibility and legality of the music products.

In an interview, lead singer of the 2009 local band Supper Moment Sunny Chan Chi-Sun said "It’s like you can just buy a belt from a shop, or some shops will host workshops where you can learn how to make a belt. I think that’s the difference. If you can take part in the project, then you’ll get more satisfaction out of it than just buying something. If you apply this to music, the buyers will be really invested in your work."

== Notable projects and creators ==
According to the official statistics of MusicBee, starting from 2015, there have been 63 launched projects, 2 of which are still in progress. Among the 63 projects, 42 of them have been successfully launched. The success rate of launching a music project is around 66% and the total amount pledged is HKD$5,372,668.

A Hong Kong singer-songwriter Chet Lam Yat Fung, who has released more than 10 albums, considered to have a crowdfunded music project. In February 2015, Chet put up his new album "Crossroads" on Musicbee as a platform for funding. Just over two weeks, he received more than HK$265,000 in backing, obviously exceeded his initial HK$200,000 goal. With that project he successfully launched the site.

Supported by the crowdfunding on Musicbee, a concert named "Music Festival on the Rooftop" was held on 23 May 2015 and 27 June 2015 in Kwun Tong. Musicians including Jabin Law, Teriver Cheung, Mara Measor, Another Kitchen, Jing Wong, In One Stroke and WATERFUNK put their idea of "It is time to keep Hong Kong Music alive!" on MusicBee, which attracted 97 sponsors to donate funds totalling in $28,660.

One of the most discussed projects of MusicBee is the album of Michael Lai Hiu Yeung. Michael was originally a part-time performer who was still in school, armed with an acoustic guitar. Gaining increasing popularity, he realized his dream in music and decided to make his first album through crowdfunding on MusicBee. In June 2015, he received $201,090 of funds from 320 sponsors within 2 months.

On 2016 February, the project "MusicBee 1st Anniversary Concert" was launched, with the total funding time of 24days, it has gathered 618 funders and funded HK$714,000, became the project that has the most funders and most fundings till now.

However, the chance of success to launch a music project is based on several factors, for instance, media exposure, personal fame and the type of music. Nobody can guarantee a musician can get the amount of money that he expects.

== Controversies ==
- In July 2015, an independent political singer, Banana Milk (香蕉奶)’s crowdfunding project was forced to be shut down, due to the unidentified sponsors. These sponsors provided fake contact or fake address. The crowdfunding project was criticized for its unclear source of fundings, and lack of full disclosure.
- In March 2016, MusicBee as one of the crowdfunding platforms in Hong Kong, was criticized as an organization not supervised by the legislations nor regulated according to the local newspaper and the report by the Hong Kong Government. The sponsors may also be taking a relatively high risk, since they might not get back their funding or the music products.
