= Tong Li =

Tong Li or Tongli may refer to:

- Tongli, a town in Suzhou, China
- Tong Li Publishing, a publishing company in Taiwan
- Tong Li (童丽), female Chinese pop/folk singer
- Tom Lee Music, a Hong Kong musical instrument retailer pronounced "Tongli" in Mandarin

== See also ==
- Li Tong (disambiguation)
