= AT17 =

AT17 or AT-17 may mean:

- Hexachlorophene, an organic chemical that was used as an antiseptic and also in agriculture
- Cessna AT-17, a military training aircraft of World War II

At 17 may refer to:

- at17, a Hong Kong cantopop band
- At Seventeen, a 1975 song by Janis Ian and covered in 2013 by Celine Dion
