= YLK =

YLK may refer to:

- YLK Organization, a Hong Kong musical duo
- Youth Legacy Kilometer, a sponsorship program that formed much of the 1984 Summer Olympics torch relay
- Lake Simcoe Regional Airport (IATA code), in Ontario, Canada
