= East Meets West (2011 film) =

2011 Hong Kong film by Jeffrey Lau

- Film poster
- Directed by: Jeffrey Lau
- Written by: Jeffrey Lau
- Produced by: Julia Chu; Wan Jun
- Starring: Kenny Bee; Karen Mok; Eason Chan; Ekin Cheng; Huang Yi; Jaycee Chan; William So; Alex Fong; Stephy Tang
- Cinematography: Wong Bo-man; Lam Wah-chuen
- Edited by: Marco Mak
- Music by: Anthony Wong Yiu-ming; Mark Lui; Yang Zhenbang
- Production company: Distribution Workshop
- Distributed by: Distribution Workshop
- Release date: 24 November 2011
- Running time: 99 minutes
- Countries: Hong Kong; China
- Language: Cantonese

East Meets West (東成西就2011) is a 2011 Hong Kong comedy film directed by Jeffrey Lau. The film references elements of various films such as The One-Armed Swordsman, Black Rose II, and jiangshi films.

== Plot ==
Put under pressure, a group of various musicians unlock their superpowers and become seven of the Eight Heavenly Dragons. The eighth watches as the others perform good deeds and conspires to destroy them after failing to do so in previous lives.

== Cast ==
- Kenny Bee as Kenny Bee
- Eason Chan
- Ekin Cheng
- Karen Mok
- Stephy Tang
- William So
- Tan Weiwei
- Jaycee Chan
- Huang Yi
- Tiffany Tang
- Yang Mi
- Han Dong (actor)
- Jonathan Lee (musician)
- Alex Fong (singer)
- Alan Tam
- Ma Tianyu
- Qiao Renliang
- Bennett Pang
- Joker Xue
- Van Fan
- Eman Lam
- Chet Lam
- Soler (band)
- He Meitian
- Anthony Chan

== See also ==
- The Eagle Shooting Heroes, a 1993 parody film by Lau

== Awards and nominations ==
Year	Award	Category	Nominee	Result	Ref.
2012	3rd Golden Broom Awards	Most Disappointing Ensemble Cast	-	Won	
2012	Hong Kong Film Critics Society Award 2012	Best Actress	Karen Mok	Nominated	
