= Li Tong =

Li Tong may refer to:

== Lǐ Tōng 李通 ==
- Li Tong (Ciyuan) (李通), courtesy name Ciyuan (次元), Han dynasty general
- Li Tong (Wenda) (李通), courtesy name Wenda (文達), Han dynasty general
- Li Tong (Tang dynasty) (李通), Tang dynasty prince, 18th son of Emperor Daizong of Tang
- Li Tong (Jin dynasty) (李通), Jin dynasty official

== Lǐ Tóng 李彤 ==
- Li Tong (canoeist) (李彤), Chinese slalom canoeist
- Li Tong (hurdler) (李彤), Chinese hurdler
- Li Tong (musician) (李彤), Chinese guitarist, founding member of Black Panther

== See also ==
- Tong Li (disambiguation)
