= At17 =

Hong Kong Cantopop folktronica band

at17
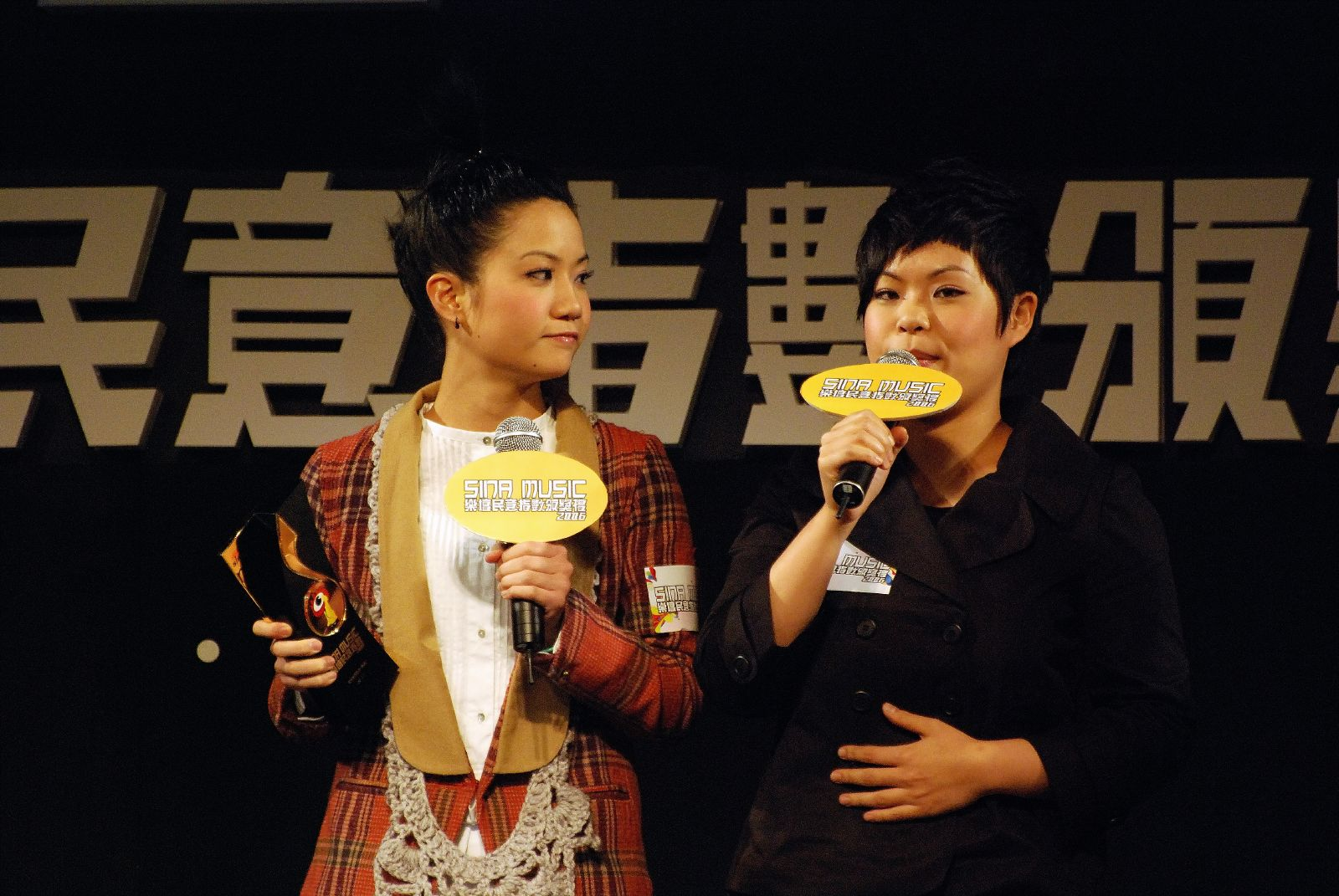
- Born: British Hong Kong
- Years active: 2002–2010, 2017

Chinese name
- Chinese: 雁石分天
Transcriptions
Standard Mandarin
- Hanyu Pinyin: Yànshífēntiān
Yue: Cantonese
- Jyutping: ngaan6 sek6 fan1 tin1
- Musical career
- Origin: Hong Kong
- Genres: Cantopop; folktronica
- Label: People Mountain People Sea
- Past members: Eman Lam; Ellen Joyce Loo (deceased)
- Website: People Mountain People Sea

at17, consisting of Eman Lam and Ellen Joyce Loo, were a Hong Kong–based folktronica and Cantopop all-female band managed by People Mountain People Sea.

== Biography ==
Loo and Lam first met each other at a singing competition held by Tom Lee Music Hong Kong – "Original Music 2000" (原音2000), in which Loo won the 3rd Prize and Lam won the 2nd. They were among the youngest participants. After the competition, they started performing at university campuses and other tertiary institutions in Hong Kong. In 2001, they were discovered by Anthony Wong Yiu-ming, the chairman of the music production company People Mountain People Sea and a renowned singer-songwriter during the 90's. Lam and Loo were then signed by the company on 1 January 2002, and the group was named at17.

The duo was invited to Amsterdam and performed as part of the Hong Kong Festival in 2005. From April 2006 to March 2007, they were appointed MCs for TVB's popular weekly music show Jade Solid Gold and frequently performed live in the show.

Their first mega concert Sing Sing Sing 2006 took place at AsiaWorld–Expo on 30 September 2006. Subsequently, they held a series of mini live shows called Just the two of us at Shouson Theatre, Hong Kong Arts Centre from 1 March 2007 to 1 May 2007, where they performed the songs of other artists.

Both Loo and Lam were involved considerably in the songwriting and production for their albums. Loo played the guitar and piano, and Lam plays the guitar and various percussion instruments. Their style may be best described as folktronica.

The group disbanded in 2010, as Loo pursued a solo career.

Loo died after falling from her apartment building in Happy Valley, Hong Kong on 5 August 2018, at the age of 32.

== About the name ==
The group name at17 was derived from the song "At Seventeen", a bittersweet commentary on adolescent cruelty and teenage angst, sung by one of Lam's favourite singers Janis Ian. Inspired by the song, a lot of at17's songs express teenage girls' sentiments, but in a slightly optimistic way. The style of their songs has shown some influences from Janis Ian as well.

== Discography ==
=== Albums ===
- Meow Meow Meow (19 December 2002)
- KissKissKiss (24 December 2003)
- 903 California Red: Eleven Fires Concert (10 September 2004)
- Twins x at17 Live in Music (23 September 2005)
- Bian Bian Bian (28 November 2005)
- Sing Sing Sing E.P. (30 September 2006)
- Sing Sing Sing Live in Concert 2006 (7 December 2006)
- Threesome + at17 (2002–2007 New + Best Collection) (20 March 2007)
- Over The Rainbow (15 July 2008)
- Over The Rainbow Vol.2 (24 October 2008)
- Over The Rainbow Vol.3 (17 April 2009)
- Over The Rainbow Vol.4 (15 September 2009)
- Just the two of us... until we meet again live (2 July 2010)

=== DVDs ===
- 903 California Red: Eleven Fires Concert (10 September 2004)
- Twins x at17 Live in Music (23 September 2005)
- Sing Sing Sing Live in Concert 2006 (Dec 2006)

== Publications ==
- I learned the chords at seventeen, collection of 22 originals guitar scores from at17's songs, transcribed by Ellen Joyce Loo in both standard notation and guitar tablature. 2005, published by People Mountain People Sea / Kubrick, Hong Kong, ISBN 988-97905-7-2
- Do I have problem or not ? (我有冇問題?), proses collection in Chinese language, written by at17, 2005, published by Youth Culture (青春文化), Hong Kong, ISBN 988-98445-7-5.

== See also ==
- People Mountain People Sea
- Chet Lam
