= Ellen Joyce Loo =

Musical artist (1986-2018)

- 盧凱彤
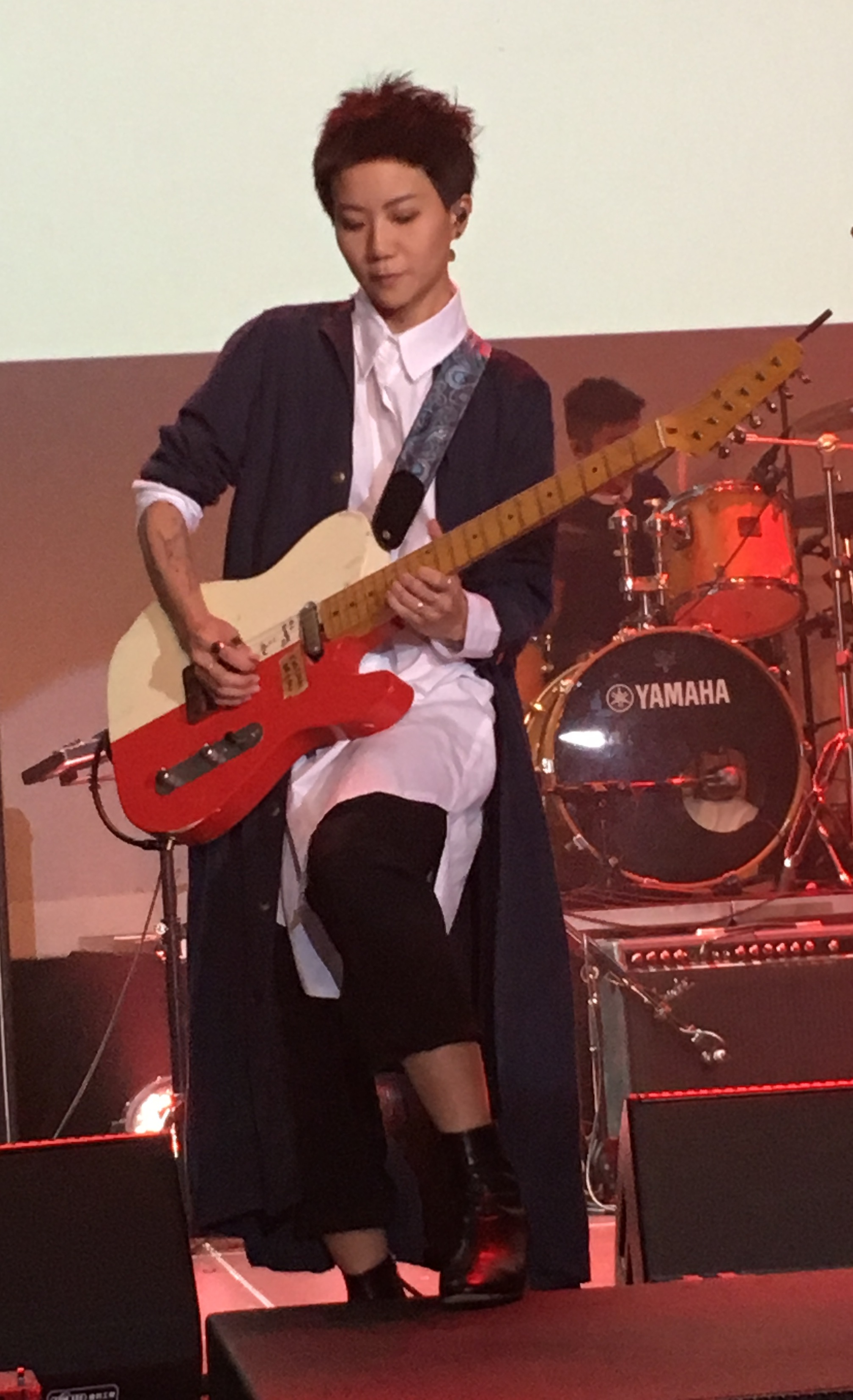
- Loo in 2017
- Born: 27 March 1986; Toronto, Ontario, Canada
- Died: 5 August 2018 (aged 32); Happy Valley, Victoria City, Hong Kong (special administrative region of China)
- Education: Secondary 5, St. Paul's Convent School
- Occupations: Musician; singer-songwriter; record producer
- Years active: 2002–2018
- Spouse: Fisher Yu (m. 2016)

Chinese name
- Traditional Chinese: 盧凱彤
- Simplified Chinese: 卢凯彤
Transcriptions
Standard Mandarin
- Hanyu Pinyin: Lú Kǎitóng
Yue: Cantonese
- Jyutping: Lou4 Hoi2tung4
- Musical career
- Also known as: Ah Mui (阿妹); Sister Mui (妹姐); Rockmui
- Genres: Folktronica; Cantopop; rock
- Instruments: Vocals; guitar; bass; piano
- Label: People Mountain People Sea
- Website: peoplemountainpeoplesea.com

Ellen Joyce Loo Hoi Tung (Chinese: 盧凱彤; Jyutping: Lou4 Hoi2tung4; 27 March 1986 – 5 August 2018) was a Hong Kong musician, singer-songwriter and record producer. She was the guitarist, backing vocalist and a co-founder of the folk-pop rock group at17.

== Early life ==
Loo was born in Toronto, Canada, on March 27, 1986. At age 4, she moved to Hong Kong. She learned classical guitar from her father at the age of nine. At age 14, she and her older brother, P. J. Loo, entered the musical competition "Original Music 2000" (原音2000), which was held by Tom Lee Music in Hong Kong. They won third prize in the competition.

== Personal life ==
Loo was diagnosed with bipolar disorder in 2013, and made her first public statement regarding the disorder in April 2015. She came out as a lesbian at the Golden Melody Awards in Taiwan in 2017. She married Taiwanese cinematographer Fisher Yu in 2016. The couple registered their marriage in Canada.

== Death ==
Loo died after falling from her apartment building in Happy Valley, Hong Kong, on 5 August 2018, at the age of 32. The case was classified as suicide by police after checking CCTV footage of the building. No suicide note was found.

== Publications ==
- Lost. Escape. Rockmuiology – A collection of the photographs she took over 3 years of her life with her Revue 35CC camera prior to the publication, accompanied by a series of writings (in English). 240 pages, published by Youth Culture (青春文化) in July 2006, Hong Kong, ISBN 988-99184-0-4.
- I learned the chords at 17, collection of 22 original guitar scores from at17's songs, transcribed by Loo in both standard notation and guitar tablature. 2005, published by People Mountain People Sea / Kubrick, Hong Kong, ISBN 988-97905-7-2
