= YLK Organization =

Hong Kong musical duo

- Born: Hong Kong
- Years active: 1997-2000

Chinese name
- Traditional Chinese: 余力機構
- Simplified Chinese: 余力机构
Transcriptions
Standard Mandarin
- Hanyu Pinyin: yu2 li4 ji1 gou4
Yue: Cantonese
- Jyutping: jyu4 lik6 gei1 gau3
- Musical career
- Origin: Hong Kong
- Genres: Cantopop
- Labels: People Mountain People Sea
- Members: Keith Chan; Kitty Yu

YLK Organization was a short-lived Hong Kong musical duo and one of the earliest bands under local label People Mountain People Sea. The duo consists of vocal Kitty Yu (余力姬) and musician Chan Fai Young (陳輝煬), who later went on to become an important Cantopop songwriter.

YLK Organization launched 2 official albums, including YLK Organization (1997) and Happiness (2000), the cover of the latter album parodies the famous poster of French New Wave director Jean-Luc Godard's Breathless.
