= Yoyo Sham =

Hong Kong singer (born 1984)

Yoyo Sham 岑寧兒
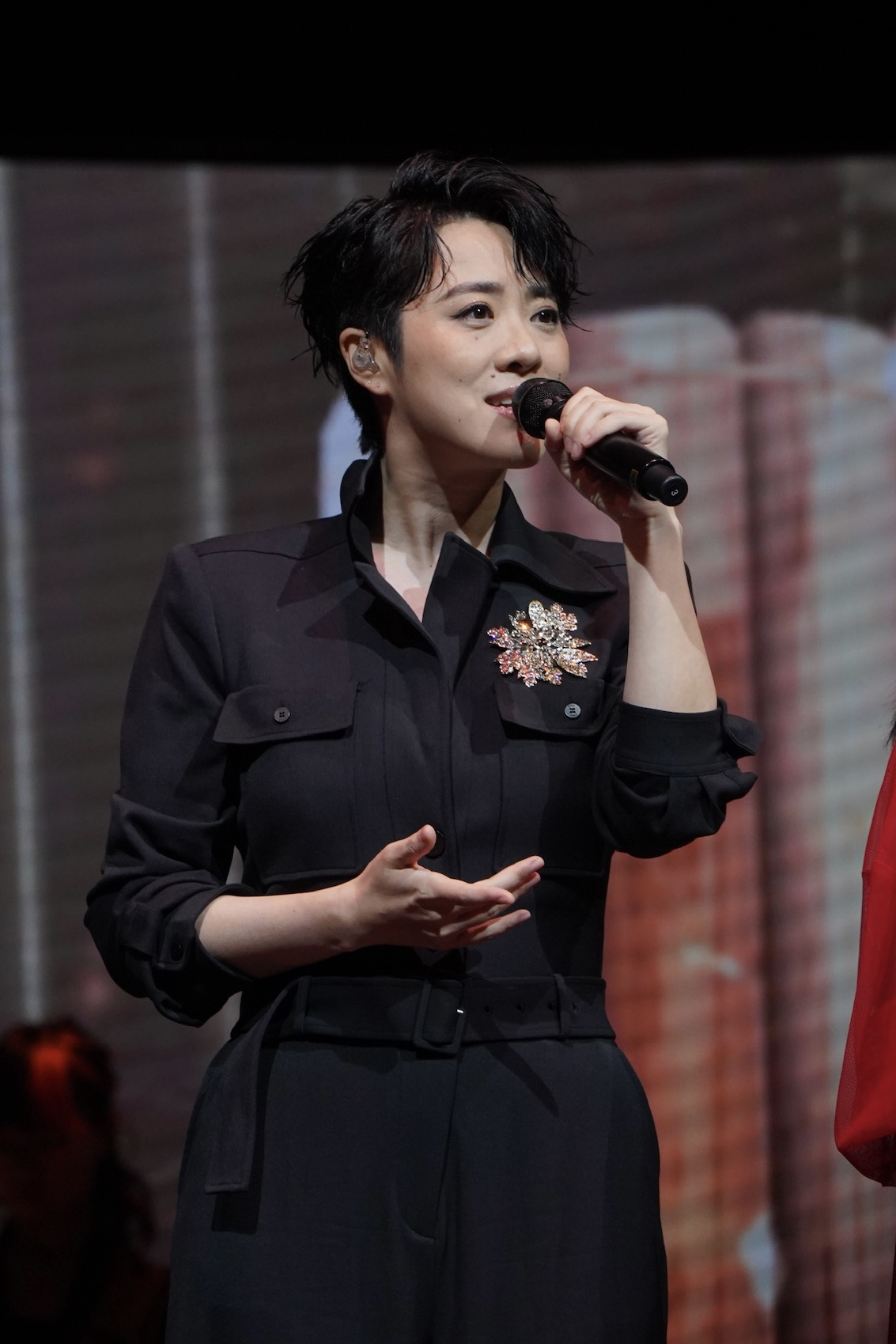
- Sham in July 2024
- Citizenship: Canada
- Education: York University Bachelor of Arts
- Alma mater: St. Paul Co-educational College Primary School; West Island School
- Parent(s): John Shum (Father); Tina Liu (Mother)
- Relatives: Cousin: Jerald Chan

Yoyo Sham (Chinese: 岑寧兒, born 7 November 1984) is a Hong Kong singer-songwriter.

== Biography ==
Yoyo Sham was born in 1984 to the Hong Kong artists John Shum and Tina Liu. She was a member of a choir in her childhood, and in 1993, she sang "Three's Company" in place of her sister, Sze-sze. She attended St. Paul's Co-educational College Primary School and later West Island Secondary School. When she was 17, she moved to Canada to study.

After graduating from York University in Toronto, she worked as a film production assistant before becoming a backing vocalist. She met Jonathan Lee through work and became his apprentice, receiving vocal instruction. Through her cousin, Jerald Chan, a member of the group Swing, she began providing backing vocals at concerts. In 2010, Hong Kong singer Eason Chan gave her a solo performance of "The End of the World" at his DUO Eason Chan 2010 Concert, which brought her public attention. In June 2011, she sang an a cappella version of "Three's Company" in place of her mother.

Shan has received several nominations for the Golden Melody Awards, held in Taiwan.
