= People Mountain People Sea (label) =

Hong Kong music production company

PMPS' logo

People Mountain People Sea (Chinese: 人山人海, idiomatically "huge crowds of people"), is a Hong Kong music production company established by singer-songwriter Anthony Wong Yiu Ming with a team of artists and musicians on 16 June 1999.

== About PMPS ==
The name of the company originated from one of Wong's albums released in 1997 under the same name. PMPS was intended to be artistically oriented, in contrast to the majority of music production companies in Hong Kong, which are commercial-oriented. The founders of PMPS included producers, singers, songwriters, sound engineers, musicians, etc.

Although an independent production company, PMPS also handles production of albums for popular singers such as Leslie Cheung, Faye Wong, Eason Chan, Andy Hui and Miriam Yeung. Their services mainly focus on song-writing and production. PMPS also participates in movie scoring, theatre and dance music production.

Since 2002, PMPS started to sign in singers under their own label. Their first act signed was at17, a Folktronica music group. Their success led the company to sign another group, PixelToy.

== Founding members ==
- Anthony Wong Yiu Ming (黃耀明) – Company director
- Arion (亞里安) – Editor/critic in music and film
- Keith Leung (Gaybird) (梁基爵) – Songwriter, producer, sound installation artist
- Jason Choi (蔡德才) – Songwriter, producer
- Veronica Lee (VeeGay) (李端嫻) – Sound engineer, producer
- Yu Yat Yiu (于逸堯) – Songwriter, lyricist, producer, film score writer
- Cedric chan (陳浩峰) – Lyricist, singer
- Pia Ho (何秀萍) – Lyricist

== Studio PMPS ==
PMPS' logo

In 2006, PMPS established their own studio, named Studio PMPS, to facilitate musical and multimedia productions and possible expansion into television production.

== See also ==
- at17
- YLK Organization
