= Chet Lam =

Hong Kong–based singer-songwriter

- Born: 11 April 1976 (age 50); Yau Ma Tei, Kowloon, Hong Kong
- Other name: Yatfung Lam
- Occupations: Singer-songwriter, composer, lyricist, traveller
- Years active: 2003–present

Chinese name
- Traditional Chinese: 林一峰
Transcriptions
Standard Mandarin
- Hanyu Pinyin: Lín Yīfēng
Yue: Cantonese
- Jyutping: lam4 yat1 fung1
- Musical career
- Origin: Hong Kong
- Genres: Cantopop, Hong Kong English pop
- Instruments: Vocals, guitar, bass guitar, Western concert flute, ukulele, harmonica

Chet Lam Yat-Fung is a Hong Kong–based independent "city-folk" singer-songwriter. He is the elder brother of singer Eman Lam.

== Biography ==
Lam was born at Kwong Wah Hospital in Yau Ma Tei, Kowloon. He grew up in a public estate, studying at Choi Hung Estate and Chi Wan Shan. He started his own label LYFE Music in 2003, with records distributed by Warner Music and East Asia Records. From 2005 he started expanding his label by presenting shows for blooming artists in town such as at17, FAMA, Wildchild, and My Little Airport. Lam has been collaborating every two years with the Hong Kong theatre "W theatre" from 2003 to 2011.

Lam has been performing professionally from age ten, in broadcasting drama and TV commercial songs. After graduating from City University of Hong Kong, where he majored in Japanese Business, he started songwriting, and has released more than 200 compositions in the Chinese music industry.

In 2003, Lam's debut album "Pillow Songs" was released to warm reception from critics and listeners. As a result, Lam became one of the best-selling singers in Hong Kong. His second album "Travelogue, One" brought him a Best New Artist Award and a Top Ten Album of the Year in the Chinese Music Media Awards. As a songwriter, he has written many pop hits for such singers as Sammi Cheng, Stefanie Sun, Eason Chan, Dadawa, Elva Hsiao and at17.

Lam has released seven written collections.

In 2012, Lam started another label 'Seeing Creative' organizing shows for independent music acts including Arai Soichiro (Singing Hands), and the Future Sounds of Hong Kong Music Festival which featured five acclaimed local bands: Chokchukmo, RedNoon, ToNick, Modern Children and Supper Moment.

In 2015, Lam founded a crowd funding website www.MusicBee.cc with musicians Vicky Fung, Victor Tse and creative team Why Interactive, dedicated to Chinese independent music artists.

== Personal life ==
In 2005, Chet, who is openly gay, has endorsed Hong Kong Gay Pride, and made headlines in 2005 with a cross-over concert with Miriam Yeung singing "Boys Like Me." As an honest assertion of his same-sex romantic inclination, he had openly addressed his sexual identity in The Advocate.

== Quotes ==
"Lam's appearance not only could start a new chapter in the movement of Hong Kong singer songwriters, his subtle tenderness and fragility that set him apart from the mainstream stereotypical pop music emotions could make his success significant." – by Tam Kit Wang, Hong Kong, from Ming Pao

"Chet Lam Yat-fung proves with his latest Cantonese-language album, The Soundtrack of Our Lives, that he is Hong Kong's leading singer-songwriter, capable of conveying a wide range of feelings on relationships and life in a touching and entertaining manner." – Album Review, Hong Kong, from South China Morning Post

== Discography ==
Full albums:

- 【床頭歌】Pillow songs (Cantonese)(2003)
- 【遊樂】Travelogue 1 (Cantonese)(2003)
- 【一個人在途上】Travelogue, too (Cantonese)(2004)
- 【你今日拯救咗地球未呀?】The Soundtrack of Our Lives (Music Theatre Soundtrack, Cantonese) (2005)
- 【Camping】 (English) (2006)
- 【思生活】the private life of c (Mandarin) (2007)
- 【一期一会】Once in a Lifetime (Music Theatre Soundtrack, Cantonese) (2007)
- 【城市旅人】Travelogue, three (Cantonese)(2008)
- 【思路】my lonely planet (Mandarin)(2009)
- 【Back to the Stars】(English) (2010)
- 【One Magic Day】(Cantonese) (2011)
- 【愛鄖書】I Love You Best (Cantonese) (2012)
- 【Oh My Goodness】(Cantonese) (2013)
- 【Playlist】(Mandarin) (2014)
- 【Crossroads】(Cantonese) (2015)
- 【Absolutely Innocent】(Mandarin) (2017)
- 【Like Ripples, Like Love】(Cantonese) (2017)
- 【Travelogue 4 Escape】(Cantonese) (2018)

Live album:

- 【林一峰遊樂會】Travelling Live (2004)
- CAMPiNG iN Hong Kong (2006)
- 【The Storyteller Show】(2008)
- 【One Cake One LYFE】(with the pancakes) (2008)
- 【一峰二汶好天氣演唱會】Chet Lam and Eman Lam Live at the Coliseum (2009)
- 【一峰不能藏二汶演唱會】Chet Lam and Eman Lam Live (2010)
- 【One Magic Day Live】(2011)
- 【林一峰遊樂會2013】Chet Lam Dream on Live (2013)
- 【Made in Hong Kong】Chet Lam x Hong Kong Chinese Orchestra (2015)

Special projects:

- 【這一路走來】Introducing Chet Lam (Mandarin compilation) (2005)
- 【夜生活】the night life of c (Limited EP) (2007)
- 【三種幸福】3 Kinds of Happiness (Limited EP) (2007)
- 【為你含情】Hum Ching for You (w/my little airport) (2008)
- 【山谷裡的音樂】Music from the Valley (w/XiaoJuan and the Residents of the Valley, EP) (2009)
- 【好天氣】Good Weather (w/Eman Lam, EP) (2009)
- 【戀愛總是平靜地意外...來臨】Love Comes Slowly, Naturally & Silently (Love Songs EP)(2009)
- 【花訣】Requiem for Flowers (w/Shin Wong & Alex Fung)(2010)
- 【One Magic Christmas】(Christmas EP)(2011)
- 【家課】(Homework) (Compilation album)(2012)

== Concerts ==
- Live in Vancouver/Toronto (2003)
- Traveling Live, Queen Elizabeth StadiumArena, Hong Kong (2004)
- Live in Calgary/Toronto (co-headline with at17) (2005)
- Camping in Hong Kong, Hong Kong Arts Centre (2006)
- Singapore Music Festival (2006)
- Taiwan Music Festival (2006)
- Camping in Vancouver, SFU & UBC (2006)
- Make It Happen Live Series, Arts Centre, Hong Kong (2006)
- Chinese National Tour (Beijing, Shanghai, Nanjing, Wuhan, Guangzhou, Xiaman, Fuzhou) (2007 to 2008)
- The Storyteller Show, KTC Star Hall, Hong Kong (2008)
- One Cake One Live, Hong Kong Arts Centre, Hong Kong (co-headline with the pancakes)(2008)
- Music from the Valley Show, Music Hall of Forbidden City, Beijing (co-headline with Xiaojuan)(2009)
- Chet Lam and Eman Lam Live at the Hong Kong Coliseum (2009)
- Chet Lam and Eman Lam Live at Queen Elizabeth Stadium Arena(2010)
- Live in Singapore at Esplanade (2011)
- One Magic Day Live, HKAPA Jockey Club Amphitheatre (2011)
- 2011 The Last Magic Day Cabaret, Arts Centre, Hong Kong (2011)
- 2012 The First Magic Day Cabaret, Arts Centre, Hong Kong (2012)
- Chet Lam Dream on Live 2013, Queen Elizabeth Stadium Arena (2013)
- When Teresa Carpio Meets Chet Lam, Sun Beam Theatre, Hong Kong (2013)
- One Man One Guitar... and some, Hong Kong Arts Centre, Hong Kong (2013)
- Simple Life Festival, Taipei (2014)
- Playlist, Hong Kong Arts Centre, Hong Kong (2014)
- Playlist, Central Station, Guangzhou (2015)
- One Man One Guitar, Po Bar, Hong Kong (2015)
- Chet Lam x Hong Kong Chinese Orchestra, Hong Kong Cultural Centre (2015)
- Chet Lam Live in Concert, KTC Music Zone, Hong Kong (2016)
- Chet Lam Sings Danny Chan, KTC Star Hall, Hong Kong (2017)
- Joox Presents: Mr. Nice Guys in concert, KTC Rutanda Hall, Hong Kong (2017)(co-headline with Phil Lam)
- Escape Live, Hong Kong Arts Centre, Hong Kong (2018)
- Chet Lam x Hong Kong Chinese Orchestra, Hong Kong Cultural Centre (2019)
- Chet Lam x Millennium Youth Orchestra <Son of Kowloon Music Joourney>, Tsuen Wan Cultural Centre (2019)

== Filmography ==
- I Am Not What You Want (2001)
- Buffering (2003)
- Beyond Our Ken(2004)
- Mcdull The Alumni(2006)
- Trivial Matters(2007)
- Death Laughing(2009)

Voice Over

- Garfield the Movie(2004)
- McDull, Prince de la Bun(2004)
- Racing Stripes(2005)
- The Journey to the West(2013)
- The Journey to the West: The Demons Strike Back (2017)

== Stage ==
- 【馴情記】Best Memories in my Life (2003)
- 【你今日拯救o左地球未呀】Superman Forever (2005)
- 【一期一会】Once in a Lifetime (2007)
- 【戀愛總是平靜地意外身亡】Love Dies Slowly, Naturally & Silently (2009, 2010)

== Books ==
- 【音樂．旅．情】(Music, Travel, Love) (2004) - collective articles
- 【隨身聽．隨心唱】(Take it Easy) (2005) - collective articles
- 【一人一峰一結他】(One Man One Guitar) (2006) - scores
- 【思生活】(Never Forget How to Feel) (2007) - collective articles
- 【遊子意外】(Travelling Bugs and Blocks) (2009) - travel stories
- 【半滿 半空】(Half Full, Half Empty) (2013) - collective articles
- 【慢煮，快活】(Slow Food in Asia's Fast Cities) (2014) - cookbook
- 【歌裡人】(The Man in Songs) (2018) - collective articles

== Selected awards ==
- Best Song Written for a Movie – "Turn Left, Turn Right", Golden Horse Awards, Taiwan (2003)
- Best Folk Artist, Chinese Music Media Awards, China (2004)
- Best New Artist, Chinese Music Media Awards, China (2004)
- Top Ten Album of the Year – "Travelogue", Chinese Music Media Awards, China (2004)
- IFPI Best Selling New Artist Award, Hong Kong (2004)
- Song of the Year (Yu Jian), Global Chinese Music Awards, Taiwan (2004)
- Best Folk Artist, Chinese Music Media Awards, China (2005)
- Best Music, Hong Kong Annual Theatre Awards, Hong Kong (2008)
- Best Arrangement for a Song (A Traveler's Heart), TVB8 Golden Awards, China, Taiwan and Hong Kong (2009)
- Best Singer-songwriter Bronze, TVB8 Golden Awards, China, Taiwan and Hong Kong (2009)
- Best Folk Singer, Top Chinese Music Awards, China (2012)
- Album of the Year (Cantonese) – "Requiem for Flowers"(with Shin Wong/Alex Fung), Chinese Music Media Awards, China (2012)
- Highest No. of New Works Performed: Composer, 2012 CASH Golden Sail Music Awards, Hong Kong (2012)
- Best Folk Singer, Top Chinese Music Awards, China (2016)
