= Anthony Wong Yiu-ming =

Hong Kong singer and actor (born 1962)

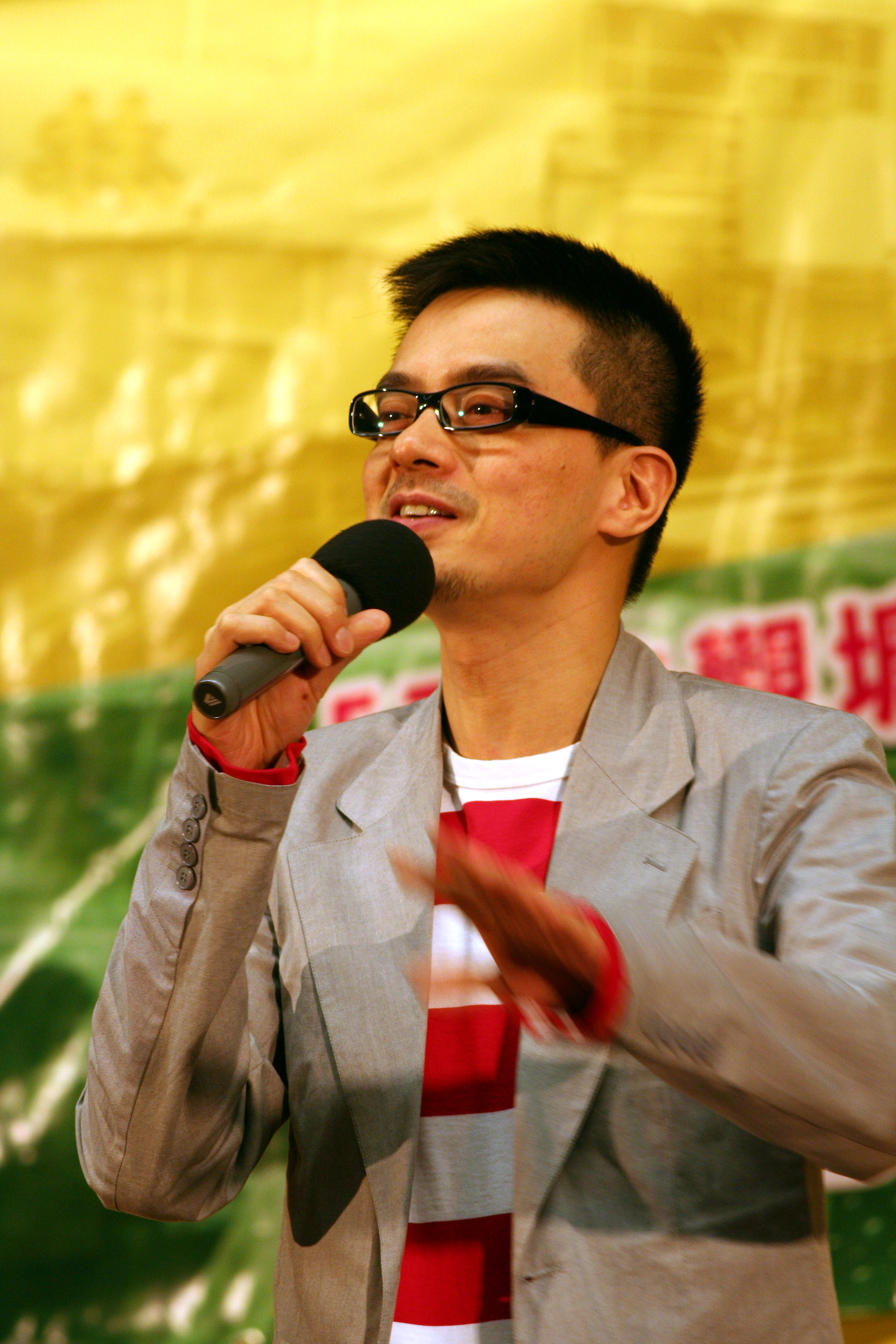
- Wong in 2006
- Born: 16 June 1962 (age 64); British Hong Kong
- Occupations: Singer; record producer; activist
- Years active: 1981–present

Chinese name
- Traditional Chinese: 黃耀明
- Simplified Chinese: 黄耀明
Transcriptions
Standard Mandarin
- Hanyu Pinyin: Huáng Yàomíng
Yue: Cantonese
- Jyutping: Wong4 Yiu6 Ming4
- Musical career
- Also known as: Ming Gor (Chinese: 明哥; lit. 'Brother Ming')
- Origin: British Hong Kong
- Genres: Cantopop, synthpop, electronic dance music
- Instrument: Vocals
- Label: People Mountain People Sea
- Formerly of: Tat Ming Pair
- Website: People Mountain People Sea

Anthony Wong Yiu-ming (Chinese: 黃耀明; born 16 June 1962) is a Hong Kong singer and actor. He rose to prominence as the vocalist for the Cantopop duo Tat Ming Pair during the 1980s before embarking on a solo career. He also performed and collaborated with the theatre group Zuni Icosahedron. Wong is the director for music production company People Mountain People Sea. He co-founded the LGBT rights organization Big Love Alliance and the non-profit charitable organization Renaissance Foundation. Wong and bandmate Tats Lau received the Golden Needle Award in 2019.

== Early life ==
Anthony Wong Yiu-ming was born on 16 June 1962 in Hong Kong. Wong is the youngest child of five siblings: he has two brothers and two sisters. Wong grew up in a housing estate in the Ngau Tau Kok area of East Kowloon. As a child, Wong developed a deep interest in music due in part to his eldest brother's record collection which ranged from Simon and Garfunkel to ABBA. He also became enamoured with local singers such as Paula Tsui. In addition, he developed an interest in films, often attending theater showings alone while still in elementary school.

In high school, he became a Christian and desired to become a priest. Wong eventually left the church shortly after due to the conflict of the church's general attitude towards homosexuality. Wong recalled in a 2013 interview: "Religion gave me a lot of inspiration, but it also gave me a lot of repression. I already realized I was gay by the time I reached high school, so the attitude of the church’s teachings was a strange contradiction towards me. The church was supposed to be a place to find release but it just became a place of suppression. And so I left." Wong is now indifferent towards religion.

After completing high school, he entered a television training course at TVB in 1981. During this period and after graduating from the program, Wong had a few minor roles in television productions. He worked as an assistant director for a TV program called Modern Women (婦女新姿) for two months in 1983. He also worked as a production assistant at an advertising company before quitting to attend a David Bowie concert at the Hong Kong Coliseum. He then began working as a DJ at Commercial Radio Hong Kong in 1984.

== Tat Ming Pair: 1985–1991 ==
In 1984, Tats Lau advertised in a music magazine called Rock Biweekly (搖擺雙週刊) in order to find a vocalist for his band. Wong responded to the ad and realized Lau also shared a deep interest in electronic music. In 1985, the band signed a contract with PolyGram with the help of Winnie Yu; she also named the band Tat Ming Pair (達明一派) by combining both Lau and Wong's given names. The duo released a self-titled EP in March 1986 and were an immediate critical and commercial success due in part to their unique sound and distinctive imagery. Wong's long hair prominently displayed on the cover of their first EP was considered subversive for men at the time in Hong Kong. The majority of their album art was directed by designer William Chang. Tat Ming Pair were influenced by British musicians such as Pet Shop Boys and David Bowie and also by electronic music.

In 1986, Wong starred in the Calvin Poon Yuen-leung (潘源良) film Kiss Me Good-Bye (戀愛季節) alongside Loletta Lee (李麗珍). The film contained many songs from their first full-length album Tat Ming Pair II (達明一派II) which was released in September 1986. For his performance in the film, Wong was nominated for Best New Performer at the 6th Hong Kong Film Awards.

In 1987, Wong starred in the film Golden Swallow (金燕子) alongside Cherie Chung (鍾楚紅). Tat Ming Pair's second album The Story of the Stone (石頭記) coincided with the release and an instrumental version of the title track was used as the opening theme song. The film's soundtrack also included an alternate recording of the song "Searching For Love (情探)".

The duo released two more acclaimed albums in 1988: I'm Waiting For Your Return (我等着你回來) and Do You Still Love Me? (你還愛我嗎). The former is considered Hong Kong's first concept album and won the award for Best Record Design at the 1988 RTHK Top 10 Gold Songs Awards in which the band also won the award for Best Performance.

On 27 May 1989, Tat Ming Pair participated in the Concert for Democracy in China which was a benefit concert held at the Happy Valley Racecourse in support of the students involved in the 1989 Tiananmen Square protests and massacre. The event lasted for 12 hours and raised over US$1.5 million for the students in Beijing. Wong also participated in the 1990 North American Concert for Democracy in China Tour (民主歌聲獻中華美加巡迴演唱會) in Vancouver, Los Angeles, San Francisco, Washington, D.C., Toronto and New York City alongside other prominent figures including Lo Ta-yu, John Shum, Szeto Wah, Lowell Lo and Deanie Ip.

Tat Ming Pair's final release before their initial hiatus was 1990's Nerves (神經), another concept album which contained many songs relating to the 1989 Tiananmen Square protests and massacre and unease towards the upcoming 1997 handover of Hong Kong. Also in 1990, Wong completed work in the Taiwanese film Ming Ghost (阿嬰) alongside Joey Wong. The film was later re-edited into a Category III film and released in Hong Kong in 1993.

In 1991, Tat Ming Pair split amicably over a difference in musical opinion and a desire to pursue other work.

== Solo career: 1992–1995 ==
Wong released his first solo album Faith, Hope & Love (信望愛) in January 1992. This album began his long-time musical partnership with musician Jason Choi (蔡德才), along with lyrics by Yiu-fai Chow (周耀輝), Kam Kwok-leung (甘國亮), Jimmy Ngai (魏紹恩), and Zuni Icosahedron member Pia Ho (何秀萍).

Wong desired to develop an eclectic and electronic sound for his first solo record, incorporating influences from acoustic, traditional Chinese and Indian music. The album acted as a cathartic release of Wong's feelings towards religious symbolism and his previous beliefs. The first song composed for the album was "How Great Thou Art (你真偉大)". The title was inspired by the Christian hymn although the song is about resisting autocracy and patriarchy. The album also contains the notable track "Dance, Dance, Dance (舞吧舞吧舞吧)" named after the Haruki Murakami novel of the same name. The song was written in dedication to prisoners of conscience such as Liu Xiaobo and Wang Dan and was co-written by Wong Wai-kwong (黃偉光).

Wong also appeared in the 1992 Evans Chan film To Liv(e). The film's soundtrack also contained Tat Ming Pair's song "Forbidden Colors (禁色)".

His second album, Borrowing Your Love (借借你的愛) was released in 1993. The album started his collaboration with prolific lyricist Lin Xi. Notable songs include "More, More, More...C'est L'Amour (每天你愛多一些)", "Four Seasons (四季歌)" and "Love is Colder Than Death (愛比死更冷)" which was inspired by the Rainer Werner Fassbinder movie of the same name. Much of the album's instrumentation expands Wong's interest in electronic dance music, specifically house music, although the album was also influenced by folk songs.

Wong released his first Mandarin album I'm No Angel (明明不是天使) in 1994. The album contained some of his previous songs remixed with alternate Mandarin lyrics. In addition, the album contained a remixed version of the Tat Ming Pair song "Forbidden Colors (禁色)", retitled as "I Am A Cloud (我是一片雲)" with a new arrangement and lyrics. It was also the first album that Wong promoted in Taiwan. One performance in Taiwan was later edited out of the official television broadcast due to Wong's avant-garde makeup and styling, which the program had considered too androgynous.

In 1995, Wong released the album The Darker the Night, The Brighter the Stars (愈夜愈美麗). The album produced one of Wong's biggest hit singles "Before Sunrise (春光乍洩)". The original title of the song was taken from the Chinese translation of the Michelangelo Antonioni film Blowup. The song won awards at the 1995 RTHK Top 10 Gold Songs Awards, Jade Solid Gold Best 10 Awards(十大勁歌金曲頒獎禮), the Metro Showbiz Hit Awards (新城勁爆頒獎禮), and Ultimate Song Chart Awards Presentation (叱咤樂壇流行榜頒獎典禮). One version of the music video for "Before Sunrise (春光乍洩)" featured Kelly Chen and was directed by Susie Au with cinematography by Christopher Doyle.

Also during 1995, Wong starred in a segment of the horror anthology 01:00 A.M (夜半一點鐘) directed by Wilson Yip.

== Tat Ming Pair: reunion in 1996 ==
The duo reunited in 1996 to celebrate their 10-year anniversary and released a new single "A Forbidden Fruit Once Per Day (每日一禁果)" which won the top prize at the Ultimate Song Chart Awards (叱咤樂壇流行榜) and the best original song at RTHK Top 10 Gold Songs Awards. They released their album Viva! Viva! Viva! (萬歲！萬歲！萬萬歲!) in October 1996, staging large-scale concerts filmed at Queen Elizabeth Stadium the same month. They also released a live album from these concerts entitled Viva! Viva! Viva!: The Concert (萬歲！萬歲！萬萬歲！！演唱會) in 1997.

== Solo career: 1996–2005 ==
In June 1996, Wong released the remix album 5 Loaves & 2 Fish (5餅2魚) which also contained alternate Mandarin-language versions and three new songs, most notably the track "The Little Prince (小王子)", the title of which was taken from the novella by Antoine de Saint-Exupéry.

From 28 February to 2 March 1997, Wong held three concerts called Wong Yiu Ming: People Mountain People Sea (黃耀明人山人海演唱會). There were also two larger-scaled concerts performed at the Hong Kong Coliseum. Because of the success of these concerts, Wong desired to set up his own record label. Wong then soon released the album People Mountain People Sea (人山人海) which was, with the exception of the title track and a hidden ending track, an album of cover songs by various artists such as Teresa Teng, Faye Wong, Winnie Hsin, Leon Lai, and Ekin Cheng. He also released the two compilation albums Love Unto Death (愛到死精選集) and A Mirror For the Romantic (風月寶鑑), the title of which was taken from a chapter title of the Dream of the Red Chamber

In 1997, Wong sang the Mandarin-language demo version of "Seven Years in Tibet" from which David Bowie studied for his own Mandarin version of the song. The Mandarin lyrics of the song were written by Lin Xi. Wong has also performed his own version of the song live several times.

In 1999, Wong co-founded the music production company People Mountain People Sea (人山人海). The company has produced and published albums not only for high-profiled pop singers like Cass Phang, Leslie Cheung, Faye Wong, Sandy Lam, Eason Chan, Nicholas Tse and Miriam Yeung but has also published works for indie musicians such as Jason Choi (蔡德才), Gaybird Leung (梁基爵), at17 and Pixel Toy. To celebrate the end of the millennium in 1999, Wong released an expansive compilation album Let’s Play Again in the Next Century (下世紀再嬉戲) which contained songs from his solo career and songs from the catalogue of Tat Ming Pair. An alternate version of the album was also released, entitled Let’s Play Again and Again in the Next Century (下世紀再再嬉戲).

In July 2000, Wong released an album of brand-new material titled In Broad Daylight (光天化日). The album contained the musical and lyrical work of Wong's usual partners such as Jason Choi (蔡德才), Lin Xi, and Yiu-fai Chow (周耀輝) but the album also contained contributions from others such as Zhang Yadong, Yu Yat-yiu (于逸堯), Kubert Leung, Chan Fai-young and Sandee Chan. The album won two awards at the Ultimate Song Chart Awards Presentation (叱咤樂壇流行榜頒獎典禮). The same year, Wong also released a collaboration album with Tsai Chin entitled Walking With Wings (花天走地). Wong won Best Alternative Artist at the first annual Chinese Music Media Awards (華語音樂傳媒大獎) in 2001.

Crossover was released in July 2002, which was a collaboration album with Leslie Cheung. Wong and Cheung performed together on two songs, with Wong taking the lead vocals on "So Far, So Close (這麼遠, 那麼近)". Wong also sang a reworked version of "If You Knew My Reasons (如果你知我苦衷)", which Cheung originally wrote for Vivian Chow. Cheung in turn recorded a cover of Wong's 1995 hit song "Before Sunrise (春光乍洩)" which coincidentally shares a title with Cheung's 1997 film with Wong Kar-wai. Wong won Best Electronic Artist at the second annual Chinese Music Media Awards (華語音樂傳媒大獎). In November 2002, Wong also released the live album Acoustic... And a Little More which contained a cover of Suede's Saturday Night.

In July 2003, Wong released an album of brand-new material entitled My 21st Century (我的廿一世紀). The album won three awards at the Chinese Music Media Awards (華語音樂傳媒大獎), including the honor of Best Record. A re-release of the album also featured an additional track "身外情 (Affairs Beyond A Human Being)", written by Gaybird Leung (梁基爵) with lyrics by Lin Xi, which was the theme song to the film Running on Karma. The song was nominated at the 23rd Hong Kong Film Awards and the 41st Golden Horse Film Festival and Awards. Wong's song "Missing (下落不明)" was also one of ten songs which won Best Song awards at the Ultimate Song Chart Awards Presentation(叱咤樂壇流行榜頒獎典禮). The song was written by Arian (亞里安) with lyrics by Wyman Wong and was inspired by the Pet Shop Boys' Being Boring.

Wong released Tomorrow’s Song (明日之歌) in August 2004, which was a tribute album reimagining the work of composer Joseph Koo. The album won awards at the Chinese Music Media Awards (華語音樂傳媒大獎). Wong also won the award for Best Male Cantonese Singer at the Top Chinese Music awards (音樂風雲榜).

== Tat Ming Pair: 20th anniversary reunion ==
In 2004, the duo reunited to release a new single entitled "Blessed are the Lonely Ones (寂寞的人有福了)". In July 2005, they released the album The Party for the band's twentieth anniversary. They staged large-scale concerts filmed at the Hong Kong Coliseum, Hong Kong Convention and Exhibition Centre and the Shanghai Indoor Stadium. Tat Ming Pair also released the live album At the Service of the People (為人民服務演唱會).

== Solo career: 2006–present ==
In March 2006, Wong collaborated with the Hong Kong Philharmonic Orchestra to create the large-scale musical production HKPO vs. Anthony Wong Live: Bauhinian Rhapsody (港樂 vs. 黃耀明 電幻狂想曲) which took place over three days. The production was an electronic fusion of classical and pop music, including covers of movie theme songs and other popular songs. The concerts were filmed at the Hong Kong Coliseum. Wong spoke about the event at a press conference: "I have always hoped to work with the Hong Kong Philharmonic, so this is like a dream come true. A lot of my works are quite glamorous and have an orchestral dimension to it, so I think this collaboration would be both spectacular and original."

In November 2006, Wong released his album Like Water (若水). The title of the album came from the Tao Te Ching quote "the best virtue is to be like water." The album's concept was inspired by lyricist Lin Xi's interest in Buddhist and Taoist philosophies. Musically, the album was influenced by Wong's previous collaboration with the Hong Kong Philharmonic and thus contains a mixture of classical-style music and electronic music. The album won the Best Cantonese Album at the Top Chinese Music awards (音樂風雲榜).

In October 2008, Wong released a folk-influenced album entitled King of the Road. The album took a step back from Wong's electronic past and focused on a more grassroots style. The album also notably included the tune "Dear Margaret (親愛的瑪嘉烈)" composed by Ellen Joyce Loo with lyrics by Wyman Wong. The song was written in dedication to courageous youth like Loo and the title was inspired by the book Dear Andre (親愛的安德烈). The album also contained a cover of the song Teardrop by Massive Attack. The album itself was titled in tribute to the Wim Wenders film Kings of the Road. The album won the Best Annual Cantonese album and Best Cantonese Male Singer at the Chinese Music Media Awards (華語音樂傳媒大獎)

Wong released the album Still Covered in Flowers (拂了一身還滿) in November 2011 and it was his first album since 1994's I’m No Angel (明明不是天使) that was primarily in Mandarin although the album also contained four Cantonese songs. The title of the album was a partial line from a poem by Li Yu. The album had another notable contribution from Ellen Joyce Loo in the song "An Unrivaled Beauty (絕色)".

In 2014, Wong released the live album and concert performance Below Tai Ping Shan (太平山下) which contained personal themes relating to Wong's life and love for Hong Kong. In 2016, Wong released the live album and DVD entitled Red Diffusion (美麗的呼聲聽證會).

== Tat Ming Pair: 2012–present ==
Tat Ming Pair once again reunited in 2012 to release a single "It's My Party" to celebrate their 25th anniversary. In April 2012, they also held a series of concerts at the Hong Kong Coliseum and released a live album entitled 兜兜轉轉演演唱唱會. On 30 August 2013, they performed again in Guangzhou. The duo celebrated their 30th anniversary in 2017 with a series of concerts once again at the Hong Kong Coliseum and they also released the maxi single "1+4=14". They released the live album 達明卅一派對 in November 2017.

On 3 January 2019, the duo received the Golden Needle Award due to their success and artistic influence on the Hong Kong music scene. In April 2019, all of the band's music was removed from Apple Music and other music streaming sites in mainland China as a result of censorship by the Chinese government due to the political and democratic nature of their songs.

In April 2019, Wong performed a duet with Shirley Kwan entitled "Happy End (快樂到死)" which was used as the theme song for the television show Till Death Do Us Part (婚內情). In May of the same year, Tat Ming Pair released the song "Memory Is A Crime (回憶有罪)" in honor of the 30th anniversary of the victims of the Tiananmen Square Massacre. It was composed by Lau with lyrics by Lin Xi. The song topped the iTunes chart in Hong Kong but was immediately banned in mainland China where discussion involving the protests and the violent military response is forbidden. On 4 June 2019, Wong performed the song live during the annual Tiananmen Square vigil in Victoria Park.

In November 2020, Tat Ming Pair held a series of concerts at Queen Elizabeth Stadium entitled REPLAY, which celebrated their two albums Fallen Angel (意難平) and Nerves (神經). In December 2020, the band released the single "All Over The World (今天世上所有地方)".

== Personal life ==
Although Wong's songs have dealt with numerous themes and emotions, since the beginning of Wong's career, a number of prominent songs in his repertoire have been directly or indirectly inspired by the topic of sexual identity. Wong had been noted in the past as "deliberately ambiguous – or better: opaque – about his sexual identity". Tat Ming Pair's 1988 song "Forbidden Colors (禁色)" and 1989's "Forget He or She (忘記他是她)" were two of the first songs in the Hong Kong music industry to deal with homosexuality and have since become LGBT anthems.

In April 2012, Tat Ming Pair held a series of concerts at the Hong Kong Coliseum to celebrate their 25th anniversary. On the final night of the residency, Wong publicly came out as gay which received a standing ovation from the audience. Wong said:

"After the first night of the residency, so many people have asked me, 'Anthony, are you a tongzhi? And you have probably read my answer in newspapers. I’m not a tongzhi if you mean a communist comrade. If you are talking about a secret communist, then I’m not a tongzhi! Actually, I think since the lyrics of 'Forbidden Colors' in 1988, and the lyrics of 'Forget He or She' in 1989, I have never tried to hide my identity. But since you people and press are always keen to ask me about it, and press will definitely be asking me yet again later, I would like to tell you, once and for all, that I am not a tongzhi, but I am a homosexual. I am a faggot. I hope other homosexual people and faggots would not need to be like the lyrics from 'Forbidden Colors': ”Let me disappear into the windy and rainy night and be reborn in another dream age". Because we are living in the 21st century now, we are living that dream now. We don't need someone else's permission about whom we can love. So people don't have to guess if I’m a tongzhi or not. I’m telling you, I am a homosexual, G-A-Y, faggot. I love men. Sorry about that, all you press workers. And because I’m going to sing for another 20 years or so, you don't need to ask me about this anymore. I would like to clarify it here tonight. I never talked about this before because I was worried that if I did you wouldn't have anything to talk about in the future. OK, so I have said it tonight and well, that's it. Thank you everyone."

Wong's sexuality had long been considered an open secret in the Hong Kong music industry, however Wong was only the second high-profile performer in Hong Kong’s history to publicly come out as LGBT, after Leslie Cheung in 1997. Wong co-founded the non-profit charity organization Big Love Alliance (大愛同盟) in 2013 to promote LGBT equality and liberation.

Wong founded his own record label People Mountain People Sea in 1999. He also founded the Renaissance Foundation, a non-profit charitable organization in 2012. The foundation "is dedicated to nurturing upcoming generations of young creative talent. It sponsors independent creation and incubates new networks of cultural industries, establishing a professional platform to facilitate entry into international markets."

=== Activism and political views ===
Wong actively supported the 2014 Hong Kong protests. Throughout the protests, he performed for and camped with the protesters. Wong, alongside Denise Ho and others, performed the song "Raise the Umbrella" in support of the protests. Wong was one of the few celebrities to publicly show support for the movement, an act which was greeted with praise from the protesters. As a result of Wong's support of the movement, he had two upcoming performances cancelled by the organizers which eventually became a total ban of performing in mainland China by the Chinese government. In 2017, all of Wong's music was removed from mainland Chinese streaming sites and his name cannot be entered as a term on any mainland Chinese search engines. In 2019, Tat Ming Pair's music was also removed. Wong continues to support democracy and freedom of expression in Hong Kong and participated in the 2019–20 Hong Kong protests.

On 2 August 2021, Wong was arrested by the Independent Commission Against Corruption in Hong Kong for suspicion of involvement in the 2018 Legislative Council by-elections. Wong was charged with "one count of engaging in corrupt conduct to provide others with entertainment at an election" due to his performance of two songs in support of pro-democracy candidate Au Nok-hin at a rally which took place in Edinburgh Place on 3 March 2018. The charges were subsequently dropped on 5 August 2021 and Wong was released on probation for 24 months and fined HK$2,000.

== Discography ==
- Faith, Hope & Love 信望愛 (1992)
- Borrowing Your Love 借借你的愛 (1993)
- I'm No Angel 明明不是天使 (1994)
- The Darker the Night, The Brighter the Stars 愈夜愈美麗 (1995)
- 5 Loaves & 2 Fishes 5餅2魚 (1996)
- A Mirror For the Romantic 風月寶鑑 (1997)
- People Mountain People Sea 人山人海 (1997)
- Love Unto Death 愛到死精選集 (1997)
- Let's Play Again When The New Century Comes 下世紀再嬉戲 (1999)
- Let's Play Again and Again When The New Century Comes 下世紀再再嬉戲 (1999)
- Walking With Wings 花天走地 (2000)
- In Broad Daylight 光天化日 (2000)
- In Broad Daylight Concert 光天化日演唱會 (2000)
- The Times with Ming 有明歲月 (2000)
- Anthony Wong Collection 1995-2000 (2000)
- Crossover (with Leslie Cheung) (2002)
- Acoustic... And a Little More (2002)
- My 21st Century 我的廿一世紀 (2003)
- The 21st Century Collection 廿一世紀精選 (2003)
- Tomorrow’s Song 明日之歌 (2004)
- I Love Ming Gor— Wong Yiu Ming Collection 我愛明哥－黃耀明作品精選集 (2005)
- Golden Classics Wong Yiu Ming 金經典·黃耀明 (2006)
- Like Water 若水 (2006)
- HKPO vs. Anthony Wong Live: Bauhinian Rhapsody 港樂VS黃耀明電幻狂想曲 (2006)
- King of the Road (2008)
- Still Covered in Flowers 拂了一身還滿 (2011)
- Tomorrow’s Cabaret 明日之歌廳(2012)
- Ming Gor’s Songs 明哥之歌(2013)
- Below Tai Ping Shan 太平山下 (2014)
- Below Tai Ping Shan Concert 太平山下演唱會 (2014)
- Red Diffusion 美麗的呼聲聽證會 (2016)

== See also ==
- LGBT culture in Hong Kong
