= Tom Lee Music =

Musical instrument retailer in Hong Kong

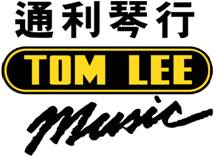

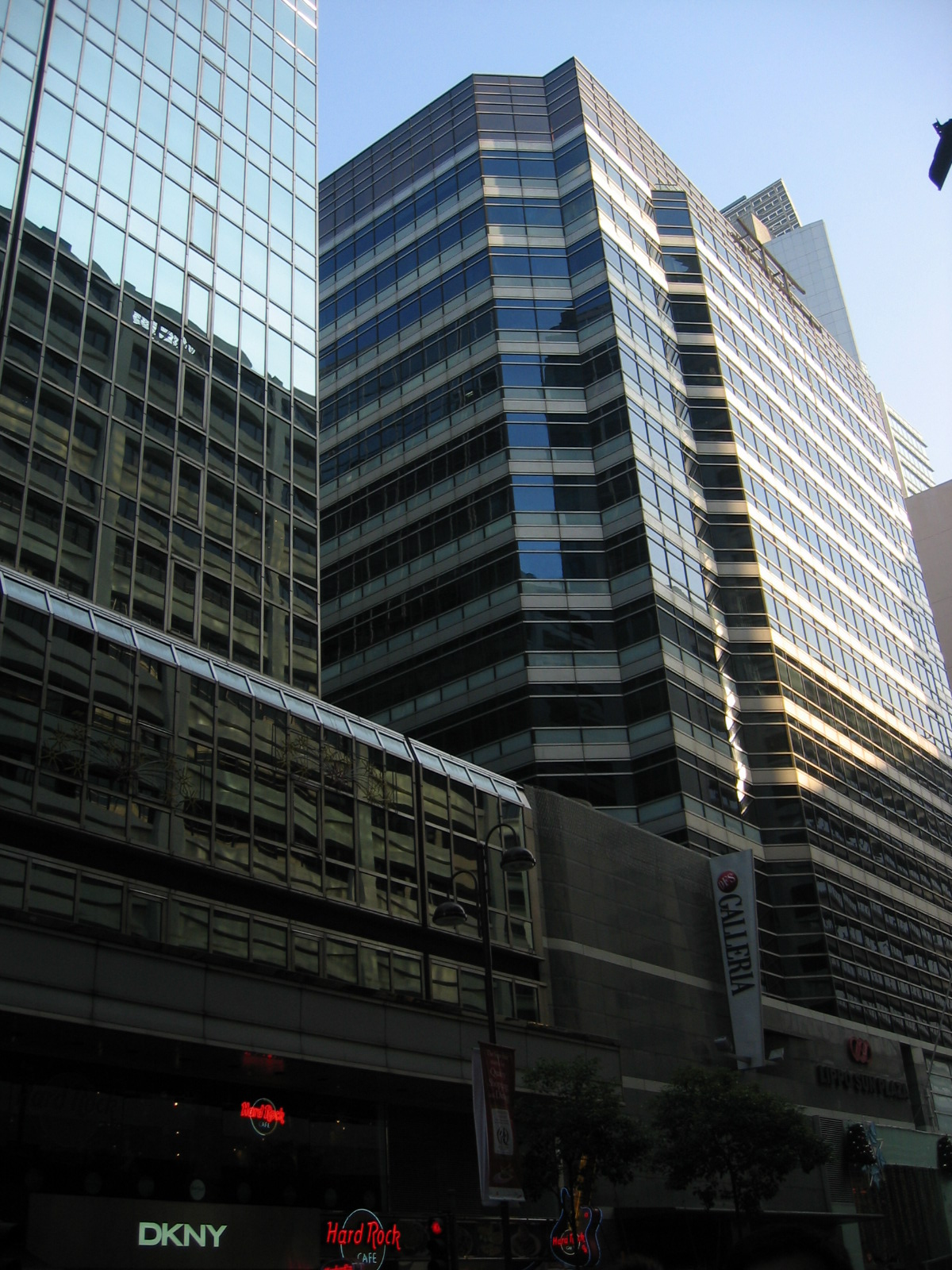
- Headquarters at Silvercord Tower
- Trade name: Tom Lee Music Co. Ltd.
- Native name: 通利琴行
- Type: music instrumentals retailer, music school, art and music events box office (Urban Ticketing System "URBTIX" with Leisure and Cultural Services Department, Government of Hong Kong)
- Industry: retail, music education, stage sound engineering
- Founded: Hong Kong (1953), Canada (1969)
- Founder: Thomas Lee
- Headquarters: 11th Floor, Silvercord Tower 1, 30 Canton Road, Tsimshatsui, Hong Kong, China (Hong Kong Headquarters) 650, West Georgia Street, Suite 310, Vancouver, BC V6B4N7. Canada (Canada Headquarters)
- Number of locations: 15 stores in Hong Kong; 12 stores in Canada; 1 in Macau
- Key people: Henry K.S. Lee ( Vice Chairman, Managing Director, Tom Lee Group of Companies) Frank K.T. Lee ( President, Hong Kong and Macau)
- Subsidiaries: Tom Lee Music Foundation, Tom Lee Music Academy, Tom Lee Engineering
- Website: www.tomleemusic.com.hk www.tomleemusic.ca www.tomleeengineering.com

Tom Lee Music is a musical retail company, Tom Lee Music Hong Kong was founded in 1953 by Thomas T.V. Lee. Tom Lee Music Canada was founded in 1969 and operate independently from the Asia operation. The Canadian head office is located in Vancouver. Tom Lee Music Hong Kong has 15 stores in Hong Kong and 1 in Macau. The thirty thousand square feet flagship store in Tsim Sha Tsui is one of largest musical instruments and accessories retailers in South East Asia, offering the most extensive range of product including pianos, guitars, amplifiers, percussion, electronic keyboards, music publications, professional and personal audio products. Tom Lee Music also offers the Yamaha Music Program. In 1960, Tom Lee Music became the exclusive distributor of Yamaha musical instruments and audio equipment in Hong Kong. The Canadian operation operates 12 locations across Canada under the Tom Lee Music and Steinway Piano Gallery names.

Tom Lee Engineering Ltd. is a wholly owned subsidiary of Tom Lee Music.

== Operations ==
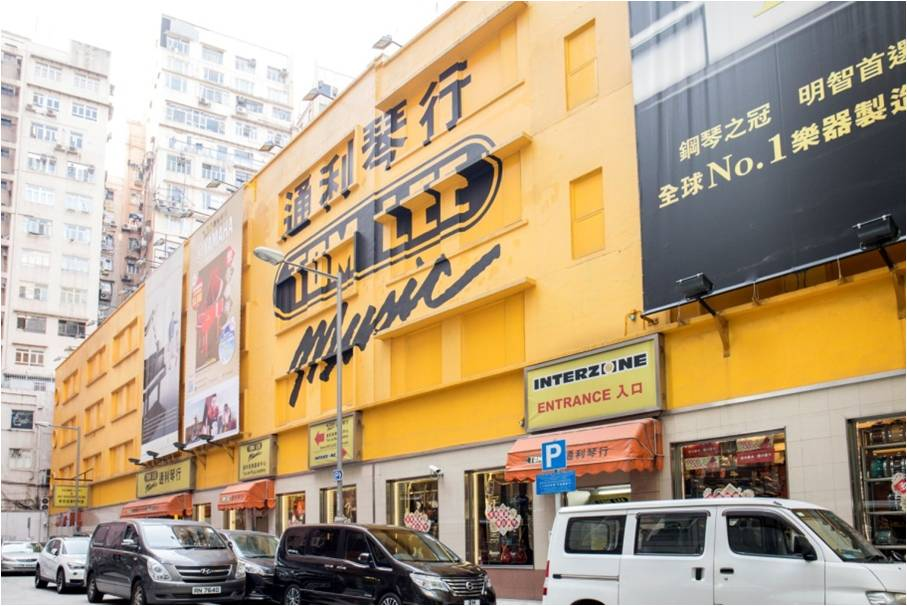
Tom Lee Music's flagship store in Tsimshatsui, Kowloon, spans over 3 floors and 25,000 sq ft.

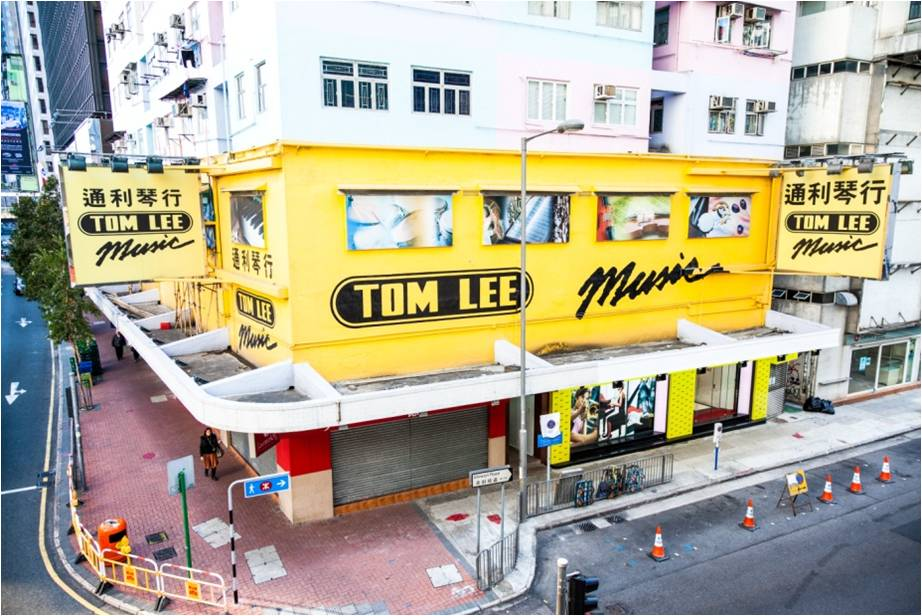
Tom Lee Music - Wan Chai Branch

Apart from musical instruments and music publications for classical music and pop music, Tom Lee Music also sells professional recording equipment.

=== Instrument repair and maintenance service ===
Tom Lee Music in Hong Kong offers repair and maintenance services for various musical instruments including audio products.

=== Facility rentals ===
==== Olympian City ====
Tom Lee Music Studio is located at Olympian City Tom Lee Music Academy. It is a recording venue for any music genre, regularly used by solo artists and bands. It can accommodate 7- 10 persons, which is an ideal venue for rehearsals and recording.

Area: around 310 sq ft

Capacity: 7-10 pax

Facilities: High quality studio effects and instruments, professional recording system and digital audio recording facility

Address : Shop G02, Olympian City 3, 1 Hoi Wang Road, Kowloon

==== Tin Hau ====
Tom Lee Music Theatre (Tin Hau) is located at Tin Hau Music Academy, 5 minutes’ walk from Tin Hau MTR station. It can accommodate 30 persons, which is an ideal venue for conferences, seminars, meetings or training days.

Area: around 500 sq ft.

Capacity: Seated 30

Facilities: Grand Piano and Basic Sound System

Address : 13/F, Park Commercial Centre, 180 Tung Lo Wan Road, Hong Kong

=== Music education ===
Tom Lee Music Foundation was formed in 1977 (non-profit-making) to promote music through education and events for general public. They run various classical, pop music and group lessons such as the Yamaha Music Program.

=== Music events ===
In Hong Kong, Tom Lee Music run annual music events including Yamaha Asian Beat Band Competition and Soundbase acoustic band competition, “Tom Lee Music Plaza” at Tsim Sha Tsui waterfront and various piano competitions and music instruments workshops.

=== Canada ===
Tom Lee Music Canada was incorporated in 1969. Its main showroom is located on Granville Street, in Downtown Vancouver. The company operates eight Tom Lee Music locations throughout British Columbia, and four stores under the Steinway Piano Gallery name in Markham, Mississauga, Ottawa, and Calgary.

== See also ==
- List of Hong Kong companies
