= Kelly Chen videography =

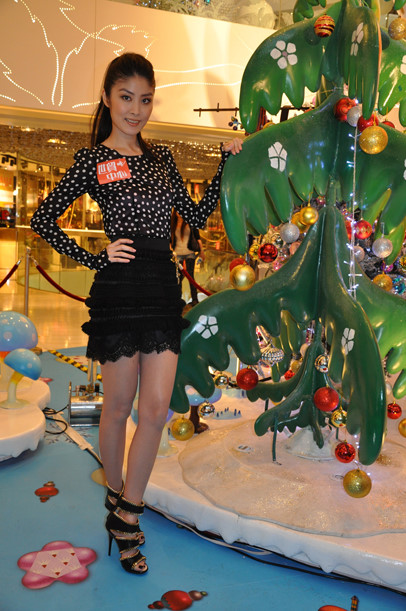
Photograph of Kelly Chen

Hong Kong singer Kelly Chen has released four Hong Kong Cantonese and five Taiwanese Mandarin video albums and three Taiwanese Mandarin video singles and been featured in over one hundred music videos, twenty-six films, six TV series, three musical special features, and over two hundred commercials. Kelly achieved early fame in 1994 when she appeared in commercials for Shanghai Beer and HSBC.

== Video albums ==
=== Hong Kong Cantonese ===
- Who Wants To Let Go 17 Greatest Hits 誰願放手精選十七首 (December 1996, VCD/LD)
- Faye and Kelly Party 菲琳派對 (February 1997, VCD/LD/DVD)
- I Care About You So Much Music Videos Karaoke 對你太在乎卡拉OK (May 1999, VCD)
- Unprecedentedness Music Videos Karaoke 前所未見精選卡拉OK (December 2004, VCD/DVD)

=== Taiwanese Mandarin ===
- Defenseless Heart 心不設防 (1998, VCD)
- The Best Of Kelly Chen Music Video Vol. 1 慧聲慧影精選集1 (1999, DVD)
- Love You So Much 愛你愛的 (March 2000, VCD)
- Flying 飛吧 (January 2002, VCD)
- Love Appeared 愛情來了 (March 2003, VCD)

=== Video singles ===
==== Taiwanese Mandarin ====
- Insight 體會 (August 1997, VHS)
- Unbelievable (不得了) (January 2001, business card VCD)
- I stop crying on the count of three (數到三就不哭) (September 2001, VCD)

== Music videos ==
Kelly has been featured in over one hundred music videos. Her single "Three Seconds" (三秒鐘) won the 1998–1999 TVB8 Mandarin Music On Demand Awards for Best Music Video.

=== List of videos ===
Year	Title	Other performer(s) credited	Description	Country
1995	Everything is beautiful because I got you (一切很美 只因有你)			Hong Kong
1995	Everything is beautiful because I got you (You Gave It To Me) (一切很美 只因有你)			Hong Kong
1995	Everything is beautiful because I got you (TVB Version] (一切很美 只因有你)			Hong Kong
1995	Everything is beautiful because I got you (Hong Kong Cantonese movie version) (一切很美 只因有你)		Montage with scenes from her first film Whatever Will Be, Will Be (仙樂飄飄)	Hong Kong
1995	Everything is beautiful because I got you (Taiwanese Mandarin movie version) (一切很美 只因有你)		It is a montage with clips from Her first filmWhatever Will Be, Will Be (仙樂飄飄)	Hong Kong
1995	To Start (開始)			Hong Kong
1995	To Start (TVB version) (開始)			Hong Kong
1995	To face the difficulties with shiny optimistic attitude (TVB version) (開心去面對)			Hong Kong
1995	It is hard to express my love to you (愛難說)			Hong Kong
1995	Intoxicated Lover (醉迷情人)			Hong Kong
1995	Intoxicated Lover (TVB version) (醉迷情人)			Hong Kong
1995	It's none of your business (唔關你事)			Hong Kong
1995	It's none of your business (TVB version) (唔關你事)			Hong Kong
1995	Who Wants To Let Go (誰願放手)			Hong Kong
1995	Who Wants To Let Go (TVB version) (誰願放手)			Hong Kong
1996	I will miss you (我會掛念你)		Chen lip-syncs in some scenes. Clips from "Spring (Taiwanese Mandarin) (春天)", "To Start (開始)", "It is hard to express my love to you (愛難說)" and "Everything is beautiful because I got you (一切很美 只因有你" are interspersed.	Hong Kong
1996	I will miss you (TVB version) (我會掛念你)			Hong Kong
1996	Spring (Taiwanese Mandarin) (春天)			Hong Kong, Taiwan
1996	I don't think so (Taiwanese Mandarin)(我不以為)			Hong Kong, Taiwan
1996	I don't care (Taiwanese Mandarin) (我不管)			Hong Kong, Taiwan
1996	Yeah Yeah Yeah (TVB version)			Hong Kong
1996	Wind, Flower, Snow (風花雪)			Hong Kong
1996	Wind, Flower, Snow (movie version) (風花雪)		Montage with scenes from her film Lost and Found (天涯海角)	Hong Kong
1996	Pusillanimity (movie version) (懦弱)		Montage with scenes from her film Lost and Found (天涯海角)	Hong Kong
1996	Pusillanimity (TVB version) (懦弱)			Hong Kong
1996	Anniversary (紀念日)			Hong Kong
1996	Anniversary (TVB version) (紀念日			Hong Kong
1996	Adoration (傾倒)		Montage with scenes from her 1995–1996 music videos, featuring a series of images of her	Hong Kong
1996	Adoration (TVB version) (傾倒)			Hong Kong
1997	You will be impetuous (TVB version) (你會衝動)			Hong Kong
1997	Starry Dreams of Love (星夢情真)			Hong Kong
1997	Tonight is especially quiet (今夜很寧靜)		Shot while Chen was on tour for her album Starry Dreams of Love (星夢情真). Clips were taken from the tour performances.	Hong Kong
1997	Tonight is especially quiet (TVB version) (今夜很寧靜)			Hong Kong
1997	The Beginning Is A Cunning Morning (Japanese) (はじまりはずるい朝/港譯：開始是狡猾的清晨)			Hong Kong
1997	Wind, Flower, Snow (Japanese movie version) (風と花と雪と/港譯：風花雪)		Montage with scenes from her film Lost and Found (天涯海角)	Hong Kong
1997	Romance Maker (Taiwanese Mandarin) (製造浪漫)			Taiwan
1997	Insight (Taiwanese Mandarin) (體會)			Taiwan
1997	What Am I To You (Taiwanese Mandarin) (我是你的誰)			Taiwan
1997	Vacuum (Taiwanese Mandarin) (空白)			Taiwan
1997	I Want To Watch A Movie (TVB live version) (我要看齣戲)			Hong Kong
1997	Way Back Into Love (回情)			Hong Kong
1997	Lover Said (情人說)			Hong Kong
1998	Fragile Heart (心太軟)			Hong Kong
1998	Fragile Heart (TVB version) (心太軟)			Hong Kong
1998	Way Back Into Love (TVB version) (回情)			Hong Kong
1999	Colors of Love (戀愛情色)		The 1999 Epson TV commercial's contents were also used to make a music video for "Colors of Love", a story about Chen and the Cyber band. Kelly plays a robot who is cursed by the devil to turn into a wild and devilish girl. Fortunately, she is rescued by the Cyber band team. They then join hands to defeat the devil and dark forces.	Hong Kong
2000	Amnesiac Weekend (失憶周末)		The content was the same as the 2000 Samsung TV commercial. Chen dressed as a "spicy cyber girl", dancing and DJing at a rave.	Hong Kong
2000	Amnesiac Weekend (TVB version) (失憶周末)		Similar to the official version.	Hong Kong
2002 10	Poisonous Love (情毒		Chen portrays both the actress and actor, which she respectively described as the "lovelorn girl" and the "lovelorn man", in a story about the trauma of losing love.	Hong Kong
2002 10	Poisonous Love (TVB version) (情毒)		Similar to the official version.	Hong Kong
2002 12	To Love More (更愛)			Hong Kong
2006 8	To Sever All Ties (TVB version) (一刀兩斷)			Hong Kong

== Filmography ==
Her film debut was in 1995 in Whatever Will Be, Will Be (仙樂飄飄, Xian Yue Piao Piao, literally 'Heavenly Music Floating in the Air'). Chen has since starred and made cameos in a number of films. Her filmography includes:

=== List of films ===
Year	Title	Country
1995	Whatever Will Be, Will Be (仙樂飄飄)	Hong Kong
1995	The Age of Miracles	Hong Kong
1996	Lost and Found (天涯海角)	Hong Kong
1997	A Chinese Ghost Story: The Tsui Hark Animation	Hong Kong
1998	Anna Magdalena (安娜瑪德蓮娜)	Hong Kong, Japan
1998	Hot War (幻影特攻)	Hong Kong, Taiwan
1999	Metade Fumaca (半支煙) – cameo	Hong Kong
2000	Tokyo Raiders (東京攻略)	Hong Kong
2000	And I Hate You So (小親親)	Hong Kong
2000	Lavender (薰衣草)	Hong Kong
2001	Calmi Cuori Appassionati (冷靜與熱情之間)	Hong Kong, Japan
2001	Merry Go Round (初戀拿喳麵) – cameo	Hong Kong
2002	Infernal Affairs (無間道)	Hong Kong
2003	Infernal Affairs III (無間道 III)	Hong Kong
2004	Breaking News (大事件)	Hong Kong
2004	Super Model (我要做Model) – cameo	Hong Kong
2006	McDull, the Alumni (春田花花同學會) – OL	Hong Kong
2007	It's a Wonderful Life (心想事成)	Hong Kong
2008	An Empress and the Warriors (江山美人)	Hong Kong
2010	72 Tenants of Prosperity (72家租客)	Hong Kong
2012	All's Well, Ends Well 2012 (八星抱喜)	Hong Kong
2013	Tales from the Dark 1 (李碧華鬼魅系列: 迷離夜)	Hong Kong
2014	The Monkey King (西游記之大鬧天宮)	Hong Kong
2014	Horseplay (盜馬記)	Hong Kong
2015	An Inspector Calls (浮華宴)	Hong Kong
2016	The Monkey King 2 (西遊記之孫悟空三打白骨精)	Hong Kong

== Television ==
=== TV series ===
Year	Title	Role	Description	Network	Director(s)	Country
1999	Ghost's House (鬼の棲家/港譯：鬼之棲家)	リー		Fuji Television		Japan
1999	When We Were Young 99 (小時候99)	Teacher (Cameo)		RTHK		Hong Kong
2001	Unmarried Family (非婚家族)	Herself (Cameo)		Fuji Television		Japan
2002	Friends (命運之戀)	Saleswoman (Cameo)		TBS MBC		Japan, South Korea
2003-2004	Love Paradise in Regalia Bay (富豪海灣非凡情緣)	Kelly		TVB		Hong Kong
2004	Supreme Fate (富豪海灣至尊家緣)	Kelly		TVB		Hong Kong

=== Musical special features ===
Year	Title	Role	Description	Network	Director(s)	Country
1995	Jacky Cheung's Music Special Edition: Los Angeles of Love 1995 (張學友音樂特輯之洛杉磯戀曲1995)	Kelly		TVB		Hong Kong
1998	Kelly Chen And Alex To: Musical Love Story (陳慧琳x許志安 音樂愛情故事)	Kelly		TVB		Hong Kong
1998	Kelly Finds Love in South Africa Tour (愛情—卡拉南非之旅音樂特輯)	Kelly		TVB		Hong Kong

=== Music Show ===
Year	Title	Network	Notes
2023	Chill Club	ViuTV	EP184

=== Television host ===
Year	Title	Description	Network	Country
2000	(聯合國兒童基金會：陳慧琳內蒙愛心之旅)		TVB	Hong Kong
2001	(聯合國兒童基金會：2001年陳慧琳青海救援)		TVB	Hong Kong
2003	(親親孩子親親書)		RTHK	Hong Kong
2005	(Wall Street Institute特約：一日一英語)		TVB	Hong Kong
2007	(了解·關懷 一百萬人的故事)		TVB	Hong Kong
2008	(奧運英雄會)		TVB	Hong Kong

== Commercials ==
Chen has been involved in many commercials since starting her career and has been the spokesperson of many well-known brands. The following is a list of commercials she has appeared in.

=== List of commercials ===
Year	Brand Name	Endorsement region(s)
1994	Shanghai Beer (上海啤)	Hong Kong
1994	HSBC (匯豐銀行)	Hong Kong
1995	Chase Manhattan Credit Card (大通信用卡系列)	Hong Kong
1996	Chase Manhattan Credit Card (大通信用卡系列)	Hong Kong
1997	Chase Manhattan Credit Card (大通信用卡系列)	Hong Kong
1997	Shiseido Cosmetics PN Series (資生堂PN 春季、秋季系列)	Japan
1997	Tamagawa Takashimaya (玉川高島屋百貨公司)	Japan
1998	Epson computers and color printers (Epson愛普生電腦及彩色打印機系列)	Hong Kong
1998	Sifone Hair Care Shampoo (詩芬護髮系列)	Hong Kong
1998	De Beers (De Beers鑽石)	Hong Kong
1998	Chase Manhattan Credit Card (大通信用卡系列)	Hong Kong
1998	Shiseido Cosmetics PN Series 資生堂PN 春季、秋季系列)	Japan
1998	Madonna Liquor (Madonna 白洒)	Japan
1998	Allergan (Concept F) contact lens solution (Allergan Concept F隱形眼鏡藥水)	Japan
1999	Epson computers and color printers (Epson愛普生電腦及彩色打印機系列)	Hong Kong
1999	Epson digital camera (Epson彩色數碼相機)	Hong Kong
1999	Sifone Hair Care Shampoo (詩芬護髮系列	Hong Kong
1999	Chase Manhattan Credit Card (大通信用卡系列)	Hong Kong
1999	Citizen XC Watch (Citizen XC手錶)	Japan
1999	Madonna Liquor (Madonna 白洒)	Japan
1999	Allergan (Concept F) contact lens solution (Allergan Concept F隱形眼鏡藥水)	Japan
1999	Tu-Ka J Phone (J-phone九州版手提電話)	Japan
1999	Aube Cosmetics (Aube化妝品)	Hong Kong, Taiwan, Japan
2000	Epson computers and color printers (Epson愛普生電腦及彩色打印機系列)	Hong Kong
2000	Sifone Hair Care Shampoo (詩芬護髮系列)	Hong Kong
2000	Chase Manhattan Credit Card (大通信用卡系列)	Hong Kong
2000	Madonna Liquor (Madonna 白洒)	Japan
2000	Citizen XC Watch (Citizen XC手錶)	Japan
2000	Excite (Excite 超級網絡公司)	Japan
2000	Aube Cosmetics (Aube化妝品)	Hong Kong, Taiwan, Japan
2000	Pepsi (百事可樂)	Asia-Pacific
2000	Samsung Digital (三星電子系列)	Asia-Pacific
2001	Sifone Hair Care Shampoo (詩芬護髮系列)	Hong Kong
2001	Citizen XC Watch (Citizen XC手錶)	Japan
2001	WOWOW Cable TV (WOWOW日本收費電視台)	Japan
2001	Pepsi (百事可樂)	Asia-Pacific
2001	Samsung Digital (三星電子系列)	Asia-Pacific
2002	Marjorie Bertagne (法國Marjorie Bertagne護膚品)	China
2002	S.t. Flora Shampoo (聖芳洗髮露)	China
2002	Sparkle Casual Wear (詩柏高休閒服)	China
2002	Citizen XC Watch (Citizen XC手錶)	Japan
2002	JT Oolong Tea (飲茶樓彩美烏龍茶)	Japan
2002	Morinaga Milk Industry Crispina Ice-cream (森永乳業Crispina 甜筒雪糕)	Japan
2002	The Windsor Hotel (森永乳業Crispina 甜筒雪糕)	Japan
2002	BK Beer (日本七寶黑啤)	Japan
2002	Sony Video Camera (Sony手提攝錄機)	Japan
2002	Fujifilm (富士菲林)	Hong Kong, China
2002	Fujifilm Imaging Photo Printing Services (富士菲林激光沖印)	Hong Kong, China
2002	Pepsi (百事可樂)	Asia-Pacific
2002	Samsung Digital (三星電子系列)	Asia-Pacific
2003	Asia Game Show 2003 (亞洲遊戲展2003)	Hong Kong
2003	Redbox Plus Karaoke (Redbox Plus)	Hong Kong
2003	McDonald's "Shake Shake" Fries (麥當勞「Shake Shake薯條」)	Hong Kong
2003	S.t. Flora Shampoo (聖芳洗髮露)	China
2003	Sparkle Casual Wear (詩柏高休閒服)	China
2003	Morinaga Milk Industry Crispina Ice-cream (森永乳業Crispina 甜筒雪糕)	Japan
2003	The Windsor Hotel (森永乳業Crispina 甜筒雪糕)	Japan
2003	Fujifilm (富士菲林)	Hong Kong, China
2003	Fujifilm Imaging Photo Printing Services (富士菲林激光沖印)	Hong Kong, China
2003	Citizen XC Watch (Citizen XC手錶)	Hong Kong, Taiwan, Japan
2003	Samsung Digital (三星電子系列)	Asia-Pacific
2004	Asia Game Show 2004 (亞洲遊戲展2004)	Hong Kong
2004	Regalia Bay (富豪海灣)	Hong Kong
2004	McDonald's (麥當勞)	Hong Kong
2004	S.t. Flora Shampoo (聖芳洗髮露)	China
2004	3D Gold Jewelry (金至尊珠寶)	Asia-Pacific
2004	Christian Dior Capture (Christian Dior Capture R60/80逆時空系列)	Asia-Pacific
2004	Citizen XC Watch (Citizen XC手錶)	Asia-Pacific
2004	Samsung Digital (三星電子系列)	Asia-Pacific
2005	Regalia Bay (富豪海灣)	Hong Kong
2005	Celucasn Casual Wear (潮流前線休閒服裝)	China
2005	McDonald's (麥當勞)	Hong Kong, Taiwan
2005	3D Gold Jewelry (金至尊珠寶)	Asia-Pacific
2005	Christian Dior Capture (Christian Dior Capture R60/80逆時空系列)	Asia-Pacific
2005	Head & Shoulders Shampoo (海飛絲洗發露)	Asia-Pacific
2005	Toto Ltd. Toilets (衛洗麗高級廁具)	Asia-Pacific
2006	Celucasn Casual Wear (潮流前線休閒服裝)	China
2006	Laha beautiplex	South Korea
2006	Alux Japanese restaurant (日本Alux餐廳)	Japan
2006	Project TX Partique Vert (Project TX 日本地產Partique Vert)	Japan
2006	3D Gold Jewelry (金至尊珠寶)	Asia-Pacific
2006	Isa Knox (伊諾姿)	Asia-Pacific
2006	Christian Dior Capture (Christian Dior Capture R60/80逆時空系列)	Asia-Pacific
2006	Head & Shoulders Shampoo (海飛絲洗發露)	Asia-Pacific
2006	Toto Ltd.Toilets (衛洗麗高級廁具)	Asia-Pacific
2007	Celucasn Casual Wear (潮流前線休閒服裝)	China
2007	Project TX Galleria Vert (Project TX 日本地產Galleria Vert)	Japan
2007	Project TX Partique Vert (Project TX 日本地產Partique Vert)	Japan
2007	Maxim's Catering Mooncake (美心月餅)	Hong Kong, China
2007	Isa Knox (伊諾姿)	Asia-Pacific
2007	3D Gold Jewelry (金至尊珠寶)	Asia-Pacific
2007	Head & Shoulders Shampoo (海飛絲洗發露)	Asia-Pacific
2007	Toto Ltd. Toilets (衛洗麗高級廁具)	Asia-Pacific
2008	Samsung iDTV (三星電子 iDTV)	Hong Kong
2008	Samsonite	Hong Kong
2008	Celucasn Casual Wear (潮流前線休閒服裝)	China
2008	Project TX Galleria Vert (Project TX 日本地產Galleria Vert)	Japan
2008	Project TX Partique Vert (Project TX 日本地產Partique Vert)	Japan
2008	Maxim's Catering Wedding Cake (美心嫁囍禮餅)	Hong Kong, China
2008	3D Gold Jewelry (金至尊珠寶)	Asia-Pacific
2008	Isa Knox (伊諾姿)	Asia-Pacific
2008	Maxim's Catering Mooncake (美心月餅)	Worldwide
2008	Maxim's Catering Snowy Mooncake (美心冰皮月餅)	Worldwide
2009	HealthBaby Cord Blood Bank (生寶臍帶血庫)	Hong Kong
2009	Marccain (Marccain流行時裝)	China
2009	DHC	Taiwan, China
2009	Maxim's Catering Wedding Cake (美心嫁囍禮餅)	Hong Kong, China
2009	Maxim's Catering Mooncake (美心月餅)	Worldwide
2009	Maxim's Catering Snowy Mooncake (美心冰皮月餅)	Worldwide
2010	HealthBaby Cord Blood Bank (生寶臍帶血庫)	Hong Kong
2010	Wii Fit Plus	Hong Kong
2010	Style Hong Kong Show, Guangzhou	Guangzhou (China)
2010	Marccain (Marccain流行時裝)	China
2010	Taifeng (泰豐家紡)	China
2010	DHC	Taiwan, China
2010	Hong Kong Disneyland (香港迪士尼樂園)	Hong Kong, Taiwan, China
2010	3D Gold Jewelry (金至尊珠寶)	Asia-Pacific
2010	Ernest Borel Watch (瑞士依波路錶)	Asia-Pacific
2010	Maxim's Catering Mooncake (美心月餅)	Worldwide
2010	Maxim's Catering Snowy Mooncake (美心冰皮月餅)	Worldwide
2011	Children's Thalassaemia Foundation (地中海貧血兒童基金)	Hong Kong
2011	HealthBaby Cord Blood Bank (生寶臍帶血庫)	Hong Kong
2011	Wii Fit Plus	Hong Kong
2011	Style Hong Kong Show, Guangzhou	Guangzhou (China)
2011	Style Hong Kong Show, Chengdu	Chengdu (China)
2011	Style Hong Kong Show, Harbin	Harbin (China)
2011	Style Hong Kong Show, Beijing	Beijing (China)
2011	Style Hong Kong Show, Changchun	Changchun (China)
2011	Taifeng (泰豐家紡)	China
2011	Leander Children Furniture (利安達嬰兒家具)	Hong Kong, China
2011	Jahwa Shower Gel (青蛙王子沐浴露)	Hong Kong, China
2011	DHC	Taiwan, China
2011	3D Gold Jewelry (金至尊珠寶)	Asia-Pacific
2011	Ernest Borel Watch (瑞士依波路錶)	Asia-Pacific
2011	Maxim's Catering Snowy Mooncake (美心冰皮月餅)	Worldwide(except Hong Kong)
2011	Maxim's Catering Mooncake (美心月餅)	Worldwide
2012	HealthBaby Cord Blood Bank (生寶臍帶血庫)	Hong Kong
2012	Taifeng (泰豐家紡)	China
2012	Leander Children Furniture (利安達嬰兒家具)	Hong Kong, China
2012	Jahwa Shower Gel (青蛙王子沐浴露)	Hong Kong, China
2012	DHC	Taiwan, China
2012	3D Gold Jewelry (金至尊珠寶)	Asia-Pacific
2012	Ernest Borel Watch (瑞士依波路錶)	Asia-Pacific
2012	Maxim's Catering Snowy Mooncake (美心冰皮月餅)	Worldwide (except Hong Kong)
2012	Maxim's Catering Mooncake (美心月餅)	Worldwide
2013	HealthBaby Cord Blood Bank (生寶臍帶血庫)	Hong Kong
2013	Taifeng (泰豐家紡)	China
2013	Leander Children Furniture (利安達嬰兒家具)	Hong Kong, China
2013	Jahwa Shower Gel (青蛙王子沐浴露)	Hong Kong, China
2013	DHC	Taiwan, China
2013	3D Gold Jewelry (金至尊珠寶)	Asia-Pacific
2013	Ernest Borel Watch (瑞士依波路錶)	Asia-Pacific
2013	Maxim's Catering Custard Mooncake (美心奶黃月餅)	Worldwide (except Hong Kong)
2013	Maxim's Catering Mooncake (美心月餅)	Worldwide
2014	HealthBaby Cord Blood Bank (生寶臍帶血庫)	Hong Kong
2014	Taifeng (泰豐家紡)	China
2014	Leander Children Furniture (利安達嬰兒家具)	Hong Kong, China
2014	Mentholatum Ointment (曼秀雷敦復方薄荷腦軟膏)	China
2014	DHC	Taiwan, China
2014	3D Gold Jewelry (金至尊珠寶)	Asia-Pacific
2014	Ernest Borel Watch (瑞士依波路錶)	Asia-Pacific
2014	Maxim's Catering Custard Mooncake (美心奶黃月餅)	Worldwide (except Hong Kong)
2014	Maxim's Catering Mooncake (美心月餅)	Worldwide
