= Kelly Chen discography =

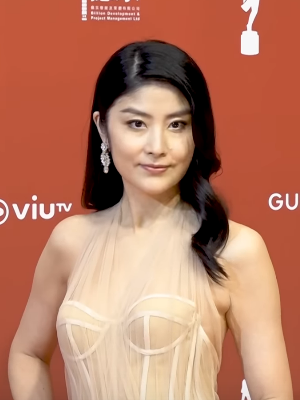
- Chen in 2022
- Studio albums: 31
- Extended plays: 1
- Soundtrack albums: 5
- Live albums: 9
- Compilation albums: 1
- Singles: 6
- Video albums: 11
- Music videos: 100
- Remix albums: 2
- Greatest hits albums: 12
- Video singles: 3
- Promotional singles: 31

Hong Kong singer Kelly Chen (Chinese: 陳慧琳) has released 20 Cantonese studio albums, 10 Mandarin studio albums, 1 Japanese studio album, 1 extended play (EP), 2 remix albums, 8 Cantonese greatest hits albums, 2 Mandarin greatest hits albums, 2 Japanese greatest hits albums, 1 Cantonese collaborative album, 4 Cantonese video albums, 5 Mandarin video albums, 5 soundtrack albums, 3 Mandarin video singles, 6 singles, and 25 promotional singles.

Chen made her musical debut in 1995 with her first soundtrack album, Whatever Will Be, Will Be (仙樂飄飄). Soon after, Chen released her first Cantonese album, Intoxicated Lover, on 15 December 1995. This album drew inspiration from early 1990s pop music, while amalgamating trip hop, dance-pop and acoustic music.

== Studio albums ==
=== Cantonese studio albums ===
Title	Album details	Peak chart positions	Certifications
Title	Album details	HK	Certifications
Intoxicated Lover (醉迷情人)	Released: 15 December 1995; Label: Go East; Format: CD, cassette	4	IFPI HK: Gold
Wind, Flower, Snow	Released: 5 October 1996; Label: Go East; Format: CD, cassette	1	
Starry Dreams of Love	Released: June 1997; Label: Go East; Format: CD, cassette	2	IFPI HK: Platinum
A Movie (Film By Kelly Chen)	Released: 20 December 1997; Label: Go East; Format: CD, cassette	4	IFPI HK: Gold
Da De Dum (I Am Falling Out of Love)	Released: July 1998; Label: Go East; Format: CD, cassette	6	
True Feeling	Released: February 1999; Label: Go East; Format: CD, cassette	1	
Don't Stop Loving Me	Released: August 1999; Label: Go East; Format: CD, cassette	1	
Paisley Galaxy	Released: 26 May 2000; Label: Go East; Format: CD	1	
The Big Day	Released: November 2000; Label: Go East; Format: CD	—	
In the Party	Released: 10 July 2001; Label: Go East; Format: CD	—	
Ask	Released: February 2002; Label: Go East; Format: CD	—	
Dynacarnival	Released: July 2002; Label: Go East; Format: CD	—	
Baby Cat	Released: 13 December 2002; Label: Go East; Format: CD	—	
Love	Released: 22 August 2003; Label: Go East; Format: CD	—	
Stylish Index	Released: 23 July 2004; Label: Go East; Format: CD	—	
Grace & Charm	Released: 24 December 2004; Label: Go East; Format: CD	—	
Happy Girl	Released: 25 August 2006; Label: Go East; Format: CD	—	
Kellylicious	Released: 16 May 2008; Label: Go East; Format: CD	—	
Reflection	Released: 7 February 2013; Label: Go East; Format: CD	2	
And Then	Released: 15 January 2016; Label: Go East; Format: CD	1	

=== Mandarin studio albums ===
Title	Album details	Peak chart positions	Sales
Title	Album details	TWN	Sales
I Don't Think So	Released: 7 May 1996; Label: Carrier Entettainment, Go East; Format: CD, cassette	—	
Insight	Released: 10 August 1997; Label: Decca Records, Go East; Format: CD, cassette	4	
You're Not the Same	Released: 18 March 1998; Label: Decca Records, Go East; Format: CD, cassette	13	
Love Me Or Not	Released: 11 December 1998; Label: Decca Records, Go East; Format: CD, cassette	10	Asia: 2,000,000
Love You So Much	Released: 20 April 2000; Label: Decca Records, Go East; Format: CD, cassette	1	
Flying	Released: 21 August 2001; Label: What's Music, Go East; Format: CD	6	
Love Appeared	Released: 10 May 2002; Label: What's Music, Go East; Format: CD	6	
You Don't Mean It	Released: 6 August 2003; Label: What's Music, Go East; Format: CD	7	
Eternal Sunshine	Released: 16 September 2005; Label: What's Music, Go East; Format: CD	17	
Chasing Dreams	Released: 16 March 2010; Label: Universal Taiwan, Go East; Format: CD	—	

=== Japanese studio albums ===
Title	Album details
Grace	Released: 30 January 2002; Label: Universal Music Japan, Go East; Format: CD

== Single albums ==
=== Cantonese ===
Title	Details
Traveler	Released: 25 November 1996; Label: Universal Music (Japan)/Go East; Format: CD
Stamps	Released: 30 January 2004; Label: /Go East; Format: CD

=== Mandarin ===
Title	Details
Insight	Released: September 1997; Label: Decca Records, Go East; Format: VHS
Unbelievable	Released: 20 June 2000; Label: Decca Records, Go East; Format: Mini CD

=== Japanese ===
Title	Details
The Beginning Is A Cunning Morning	Released: 8 July 1997; Label: Universal Music (Japan)/Go East; Format: CD
Residual Flames	Released: 2 December 1998; Label: Universal Music (Japan)/Go East; Format: CD
Ask	Released: 19 December 2001; Label: Universal Music (Japan)/Go East; Format: CD

=== Promotional Cantonese ===
Title	Details
Anniversary	Released: November 1996; Label: Go East; Format: CD

=== Promotional Mandarin ===
Title	Details
Romance Maker	Released: 20 July 1997; Label: Decca Records, Go East; Format: CD
I Don't Wanna Do It for You	Released: 2 February 1998; Label: Decca Records, Go East; Format: CD
Hey, Anyone Out Here?	Released: 30 October 1999; Label: Decca Records, Go East; Format: CD
If You Really Love Me	Released: 20 November 1999; Label: Decca Records, Go East; Format: CD
Unbelievable	Released: 20 January 2001; Label: Go East (China)/Go East; Format: Business Card VCD
Flying	Released: August 2001; Label: What's Music International Incorporated (Taiwan)/Go East; Format: CD
