= Horseplay =

Horseplay may refer to:

- Horseplay (2003 film), an Australian film
- Horseplay (2014 film), a Hong Kong action comedy film
- Horse Play, a 1933 American comedy film
- "Horseplay" (The Good Guys), a 1992 television episode
- Horseplay humor, an aspect of low comedy

== See also ==
- H-O-R-S-E, a variation of basketball
