= So Hot (disambiguation) =

"So Hot" is a song by the Wonder Girls.

It may also refer to:

- So Hot, 1982 album by Swamp Children
- "So Hot", a song by Kovas from the 2008 film Prom Night
- "So Hot", a 2013 song by Kelly Chen from Reflection
- "So Hot", a 2026 song by Dizzee Rascal from We Want Bass
- So Hot Productions, a Christian music company
- "So Hott", a 2007 song by Kid Rock
