= Jiang shan mei ren =

Jiang shan mei ren can refer to:

- The Kingdom and the Beauty, a 1959 Hong Kong film
- An Empress and the Warriors, a 2008 Hong Kong film
