= Kellylicious =

Studio album by Kelly Chen
- Released: May 16, 2008
- Genre: Cantopop
- Length: 0:38:21
- Label: Go East, K.T. rsal
- Producer: Carl Wo; M. Shu; C.Y. Kong; K.T. Cheung; Gary Chan; Alex Fung; Mark Lui; C.Y. Kong

Kelly Chen chronology
Happy Girl (2006)	Kellylicious (2008)

Kellylicious is the eighteenth of Kelly Chen's Cantonese albums released on May 16, 2008. It was distributed in Hong Kong, Singapore and Malaysia.

== Introduction ==
Kellylicious is the 30th Cantonese studio album of Kelly Chen, coming after 2006's Happy Girl. It was released on 16 May 2008. This album had been in preparation since the beginning of 2007.

The album's name, chosen by Kelly, is meant to be a combination of Kelly + delicious, implying that the album offers an array of musical flavors. Chen asked seven producers to work on the album, to offer greater musical variety.

Compared to past albums, Kellylicious was in preparation for a long time. For most of her career, from 1994 to 2006, Chen produced at least three albums every year. However, no album was released in 2007. Chen spent 2007 preparing for the film An Empress And The Warriors and her Love Fighters concert, which was held in June 2008.

== Package ==
This album is sold with one CD, one DVD and a photo album with lyrics.

=== CD ===
(All songs are sung in Cantonese unless otherwise noted)

1. 大 (Big)
2. 有時寂寞 (Sometimes Lonely)
3. 中毒太甚 (Indulge seriously)
4. 主打愛 (Love Fighters) (The theme song of Kelly Chen Love Fighters Concert 2008)
5. 傻男 (Silly Boy)
6. 太悶 (Extremely Bored)
7. 抱歉柯德莉夏萍 (Sorry Audrey Hepburn)
8. 知我莫問 (OT: Unwritten, by Natasha Bedingfield)(Don't you know me)
9. 我的脆弱與堅強 (OT: Mainichi Aitai 毎日会いたい, by Emi Wakui)(My Weakness and Endurance)
10. 最好給最好 (The Best for the Best) (An advertisement song of Maxim's Mooncake)
11. 隨夢而飛 (Flying with dream) (Sung in Putonghua with Leon Lai) (The theme song of the film An Empress And The Warriors)

=== DVD ===
1. Computer Data
2. 有時寂寞 (Sometimes lonely) MV
3. 傻男 (Silly Boy) MV
4. 抱歉柯德莉夏萍 (Sorry Audrey) MV
5. 最好給最好 (The best for the best) MV
