= Mandy Lieu =

Malaysian-American actress (born 1985)

- Born: 20 March 1985 (age 41); Ipoh, Malaysia
- Occupations: Model; actress; TV host
- Children: 1
- Modeling information
- Height: 5 ft 7 in (1.70 m)
- Hair color: Black
- Eye color: Dark Brown
- Agency: Quest Artists & Models Hong Kong

Mandy Lieu's Unofficial Chinese Name
- Traditional Chinese: 劉碧麗
- Simplified Chinese: 刘碧丽
Transcriptions
Standard Mandarin
- Hanyu Pinyin: Liú Bìlì
Hakka
- Pha̍k-fa-sṳ: Liù Pit-li
Yue: Cantonese
- Jyutping: Lau4 Bik1 Lai6
Southern Min
- Hokkien POJ: Lâu Phek-lê

Mandy Lieu (born March 20, 1985) is a Malaysian-American model, actress, and TV show host based in Hong Kong and currently residing in the United Kingdom. She has appeared in Hong Kong television shows and movies such as Horseplay and To the Fore.

== Early life ==
Mandy Lieu's father is a white American and he disappeared before she was born. Her mother is Malaysian-Chinese and unemployed at that time. Lieu and her younger brother grew up in a single parent household in Malaysia and moved to Kuala Lumpur with her family when she was 8. She worked as a part-time model during her free time. In 2003, she went to Hong Kong to develop her modelling career after dropping out of school and she had appeared in television advertisements.

== Career ==
=== Model ===
Lieu rose to fame in a shampoo commercial in Malaysia, which led a new chapter in her life. She then moved to Tokyo at age 17, one year later she arrived in Hong Kong. She repeatedly and frequently featured on the cover of many magazines, including More, Me, HIM, Marie Claire, Fashion & Beauty, Wedding Deluxe, Ketchup, Darizi, Elle Wedding. Lieu face has been used as the face of many campaigns, like Hugo Boss, TAG Heuer Watch, Max & Co., Salvatore Ferragamo, Marc by Marc Jacobs, Dior, Omega to HK Fashion Week, Ted Baker, Miu Miu, Mulberry, Shiseido, and Swarovski.

=== Acting ===
In 2012, Lieu broke into film by playing a supporting role in Tai Chi 0. Her career path kept expanding with box-office successes like Black & White: The Dawn of Justice (2014) and To the Fore (2015).

== Personal life ==
Growing up in multicultural country, Lieu is multilingual and can speak Malay, Cantonese, Mandarin, English, and Japanese.

Lieu stated that she does not officially have a Chinese name despite the rumour that her Chinese name is 劉碧麗. She said that 劉碧麗 is a name created by netizens, and she later accepted this name as it became too widespread.

In 2020, Lieu bought Ewhurst Park estate, near Basingstoke, with the intent to change the 925-acre estate to produce food for her restaurant and rewild parts of it. In 2023, a pair of beavers to be released on the grounds, thereby reintroducing beavers in Hampshire, where they became extinct 400 years ago.

=== Relationship ===
Lieu dated Bolin Chen for three years before they broke up in 2011. She gave birth to a daughter on 20 May 2015, fathered by the already married Macau casino tycoon Alvin Chau (Chau Cheok Wa's). Lieu had dated Chau for over five years but it ended when he refused to divorce his wife Heidi Chan. Subsequently, Chau paid her HK$300 million (RM158 million) as a "breakup fee" in November 2019.

== Filmography ==
=== Television ===
- 2008: Dressage to Win

=== Master of ceremonies ===
- 2010: Mr. Hong Kong
- 2013: Asian Film Awards

=== Game shows ===
- 2013: Super Trio Maximus
- 2014: The Conquerors (episode 10)
- 2014: Summer Splash (episodes 6–10)

=== Hostess ===
- 2009: Lifetival
- 2010: 老虎都要 party
- 2010: 日本‧不盡的享樂

=== Films ===
- 2012: Taichi 0
- 2014: The Splash Muses
- 2014: Horseplay
- 2014: Black & White: The Dawn of Justice
- 2015: To the Fore
