= Paisley Galaxy =

Studio album by Kelly Chen
- Released: May 26, 2000 (Hong Kong)
- Genre: Cantopop; electorinc; electronic dance music; house; techno; trance; disco
- Length: 42:16
- Producer: Mark Lui

Kelly Chen chronology
Love You So Much (2000)	Paisley Galaxy (2000)	The Big Day (2000)

Paisley Galaxy is the eighth Cantonese studio album by Hong Kong singer Kelly Chen. It was released on May 26, 2000, through Go East Entertainment Company Ltd in Hong Kong.

== Track listing ==
=== CD ===
No.	Title	Music	Lyrics	Arranger	Music supervisor
01	Paisley Galaxy (花花宇宙)	雷頌德	林夕	雷頌德	雷頌德
02	Amnesiac Weekend (失憶周末)	雷頌德	林夕	雷頌德	雷頌德
03	Titillating Me (撩我)	石嘉欣	因葵	Gary Chan	Gary Chan
04	Freshwater Heartbeat (清水心跳)	Gary Chan	甄健強	Gary Chan	Gary Chan
05	Aromatherapy for Love (香薰戀愛治療)	李漢文	甄健強	李漢文	雷頌德
06	Egregiousness (過份)	雷頌德	甄健強	雷頌德	雷頌德
07	Take My Hand	雷頌德	甄健強	雷頌德	雷頌德
08	Don't Engrave Love on Deadwood (枯枝別刻)	山口由子	歐志深	Gary Chan	Gary Chan
09	I Have Not Forgotten You (我沒有忘記)	吳國敬	林夕	孫偉明, 吳國敬	吳國敬
10	I Wanted to Love You (一早想愛你)	Davy Chan	林夕	劉志遠	Jim Lee, Gary Chan
11	We'd Better Dance (Mandarin) (不如跳舞（國）)	雷頌德	林夕	雷頌德	雷頌德
