= Whatever Will Be, Will Be (1995 film) =

1995 Hong Kong film by Jacob Cheung

- Film poster
- Directed by: Jacob Cheung
- Screenplay by: Aubrey Lam; James Yuen
- Produced by: Claudie Chung
- Starring: Aaron Kwok; Kelly Chen
- Cinematography: Mark Lee Ping-bing
- Edited by: Chang Shao-Hsi
- Music by: Lui Jim; Mark Lui
- Production company: United Filmmakers Organisation (UFO)
- Release date: 16 August 1995 (Hong Kong)
- Running time: 107 minutes
- Country: Hong Kong
- Language: Cantonese
- Box office: HK$7,597,254

Whatever Will Be, Will Be
- Traditional Chinese: 仙樂飄飄
Transcriptions
Standard Mandarin
- Hanyu Pinyin: Xiān yuè piāo piāo
Yue: Cantonese
- Jyutping: Sin1 ngok6 piu1 piu1
- IPA: [ɕíːn ŋɔ̀ːk pʰíːu pʰíːu]

Whatever Will Be, Will Be (Chinese: 仙樂飄飄) is a 1995 Hong Kong musical drama film directed by Jacob Cheung and starring Aaron Kwok and Kelly Chen, the latter in her debut film role.

== Cast and roles ==
- Aaron Kwok as Shrimp Man (Lam Kwong-lee)
- Kelly Chen as Wing (Lee Ching-wan)
- Richard Ng as Wing's Dad
- Miu Kam-Fung as Wing's Mom
- Lee Pooi-suen
- Lam Long-hei as Roy
- Kung Wan-yiu
- Ma Lee
- Mau Tat
- Kam Chi-yung
- Michael Miu as Peter's dad
- Jamie Chik as Peter's mum
- Hui Fan as Sister school principal
- Nam Hung as Sister school vice principal
- Jimmy Wong as Michael
- Dolphin Chan as Chris
- Fiona Brockway as Dancers' audition judge
- Wong Man-ching
- Kingson Shek
- Cho Sai
- Cheung Chi-kwok Mr. Poon
- Chiu Mei-ling
- Lam Chak-kwan
- Leung Ka-chun
- Jacky Leung
- Shermon Tang
- Kwong Wing-yan
- Leo
- leung Hoi-ling
- So Sing
