= Intoxicated Lover =

1995 studio album by Kelly Chen

Intoxicated Lover 醉迷情人

Studio album by Kelly Chen
- Released: British Hong Kong December 15, 1995
- Genre: Cantopop; HK-pop; Brit pop; Trip hop; Dance-pop; Acoustic music
- Length: 38:34
- Label: Go East Entertainment Company Ltd
- Producer: Mark Lui

Kelly Chen chronology
Intoxicated Lover 醉迷情人 (1995)	I Don't Think So 我不以為 (1996)

Intoxicated Lover is the debut Cantonese studio album by Hong Kong singer Kelly Chen. It was released on December 15, 1995, through Go East Entertainment Company Ltd/ Polygram Records in Hong Kong. Intoxicated Lover was characterized as a Brit Pop record that was under the influence of pop music from the early 1990s. This album includes a wide range of highly qualified songs which aren't easily found in other Hong Kong singer's debut album. And it successfully intermingles pop with elements of Trip hop, Dance-pop and Acoustic music which had a great influence on The Music of Hong Kong at that time.

Before the debut album's release, Kelly had already established a substantial fanbase in Hong Kong because she was fashionable and distinctive for a newcomer, and her first Cantonese single from her first soundtrack album 《Whatever Will Be, Will Be (仙樂飄飄)》was a big hit which peaked at number 1 on Four Hong Kong Top 10 Singles Charts.

Three singles were released in support of the album. The dance-pop track, "It's none of your business" (唔關你事) was released as the lead single and peaked at number two on the Hong Kong 903 Top 20 Singles chart. The subsequent single, the acoustic "I don't want to let you go" (誰願放手) reached number one on Hong Kong 903 Top 20 Singles and number two on RTHK Top 10 Singles. An indie pop track titled "I will miss you" (我會掛念你) was released as the final single and peaked at number one on Hong Kong 997 Top 10 Singles, number 3 on Hong Kong 903 Top 20 Singles, and number 7 on RTHK Top 10 Singles.

== Composition ==
Intoxicated Lover is a Brit pop record. It principally consists of British-style songs. Musically, the album drew inspiration from early 1990s British popular music such as Brit pop and trip hop. It was predominantly influenced by Blur, Suede, Radiohead and Portishead.

Lyrically, the songs on Intoxicated Lover chiefly talk about love and romance.

== Track listing ==
Intoxicated Lover track listing
No.	Title	Writer(s)	Producer	Length
1.	"I Want (我要)" (introduction)	Mark Lui	Mark Lui	1:03
2.	"It's none of your business (唔關你事)"	Mark Lui	Mark Lui	3:32
3.	"My heart is the same as you (我的心跟你一樣)"	Mark Lui	Mark Lui	4:04
4.	"People will never forget it (人們不會忘記)"	Mark Lui	Mark Lui	3:22
5.	"Each has its own way to jilt a lover (各有各自變心)"	黃尚偉	Mark Lui	3:32
6.	"Intoxicated Lover (Distorted Affair)(醉迷情人)" (Distorted Affair)	Mark Lui	Mark Lui	3:11
7.	"Rehearsal"	Mark Lui	Mark Lui	0:53
8.	"I don't want to let you go (誰願放手)"	Mark Lui	Mark Lui	3:11
9.	"I will miss you (我會掛念你)"	張佳添	Mark Lui	3:49
10.	"Unhappy Lady (不歡樂小姐)"	金培達	Mark Lui	4:38
11.	"Imperception (不知不覺)"	Mark Lui	Mark Lui	3:59
12.	"Everything is beautiful because I got you (一切很美 只因有你)" (Mandarin Version)	Mark Lui	Mark Lui	3:13
Total length:				38:34
