= Lost and Found (1996 film) =

1996 Hong Kong film by Lee Chi-ngai

- Lost and Found DVD cover
- Traditional Chinese: 天涯海角
- Hanyu Pinyin: Tiān Yá Hǎi Jiǎo
- Jyutping: Tin1 Ngaai4 Hoi2 Gok3
- Directed by: Lee Chi-Ngai
- Written by: Lee Chi-Ngai
- Produced by: Raymond Chow; Lee Chi-Ngai; Eric Tsang
- Starring: Kelly Chen; Takeshi Kaneshiro; Michael Wong; Cheung Tat-Ming
- Cinematography: Bill Wong
- Edited by: Mei Feng
- Music by: Mark Lui
- Production companies: Golden Harvest (China) Company Limited; United Filmmakers Organization (UFO)
- Distributed by: Golden Harvest (China) Company Limited
- Release date: 18 October 1996
- Running time: 110 minutes
- Country: Hong Kong
- Languages: Cantonese; English
- Box office: HK$5,383,985

Lost and Found (Chinese: 天涯海角; lit. 'The Ends of the World') is a 1996 Hong Kong romantic drama film written and directed by Lee Chi-Ngai. It stars Kelly Chan, Takeshi Kaneshiro and Michael Wong.

== Synopsis ==
Lam (Kelly Chan), the daughter of a shipping magnate, meets the warm-hearted Mr. Worm (Takeshi Kaneshiro) on the street one day. Mr. Worm, a Mongol, runs a lost-and-found company and Lam enlists his help to trace a missing friend, Ted (Michael Wong), a Scottish sailor and former colleague who mysteriously disappeared months ago. Lam and Ted formed an intimate friendship after working together and Lam finds herself thinking of him after his disappearance. By sheer luck Mr. Worm traces Ted's whereabouts. The latter is returning home to Scotland to run a motel for his recently deceased grandfather.

While undergoing treatment for leukemia, Lam helps Mr. Worm solve near-impossible cases at his lost-and-found company. The two develop a close bond. As her condition deteriorates, Lam decides to pay a visit to St Kilda, Scotland to settle unfinished business with Ted. In Scotland, her relationship with Ted almost rekindles. But at the end of the day, she finds herself missing Mr Worm more than Ted. She marries Mr Worm, gives birth to a daughter and then dies peacefully.

== Cast ==
=== Main cast ===
- Takeshi Kaneshiro - That Worm
- Kelly Chen - Chai Lam
- Michael Wong - Ted

=== Supporting cast ===
- Cheung Tat-ming - Ming
- Henry Fong - Chai Ming
- Josie Ho - Yee
- Joe Ma - Ting's dad
- Steven Ma - Chai Hong
- Alan Mak - Keung
- Joyce Tang - May
- Hilary Tsui - Wai

=== Cameo ===
- Jordan Chan - Chu
- Moses Chan - Lone
- Teddy Chan - Teddy
- Maria Cordero - Jane's Mom
