= A Movie (Film By Kelly Chen) =

Studio album by Kelly Chen
- Released: December 30, 1997 (Hong Kong)
- Genres: Cantopop; alternative; Ragga
- Length: 45:02
- Producer: Mark Lui

Kelly Chen chronology
Kelly's Best Collection (1997)	A Movie (Film By Kelly Chen) (1997)	You're Not the Same (1998)

A Movie (Film By Kelly Chen) is the fourth Cantonese studio album by Hong Kong singer Kelly Chen. It was released on December 20, 1997, through Go East Entertainment Company Ltd/ Polygram Recaords in Hong Kong. The album incorporates pop with elements of alternative, ragga and sentimental ballad. Chen wanted to shift from traditional HK-pop to alternative. Despite lower sales, the artistry and change of style were praised by fan.

== Track listing ==
=== CD ===
No.	Title	Music	Lyrics	Arranger	Music Supervisor
01	I Want to Watch a Movie (我要看齣戲)	Mark Lui	林夕	Mark Lui	Mark Lui
02	Fragile Heart(心太軟)	小蟲	陳少琪	方樹樑	方樹樑
03	Tears Float Far Away (眼淚飄到很遠)	單立文	單立文	單立文	單立文
04	Expectation (期待)	Mark Lui	周禮茂	Mark Lui	Mark Lui
05	Lover Said (情人說)(Antohny Wong)	Mark Lui	周禮茂	Mark Lui	Mark Lui
06	Leaving (離開)	單立文	單立文	單立文	單立文
07	I Couldn't Say It Out (講不出口)	黃尚偉	李敏	黃尚偉	黃尚偉
08	Grasp (掌握)	鮑比達	古倩敏	鮑比達	鮑比達
09	The Woman's Charm (女人韻味)	鮑比達	張美賢	鮑比達	鮑比達
10	Way Back into Love (回情)	Mark Lui	陳少琪	Mark Lui	Mark Lui
11	A Movie (一齣戲)	Mark Lui	林夕	Mark Lui	Mark Lui
