= Horseplay (2014 film) =

2014 Hong Kong film by Lee Chi-ngai

- Official poster
- Traditional Chinese: 盜馬記
- Simplified Chinese: 盗马记
- Hanyu Pinyin: Dào Mǎ Jì
- Jyutping: Dou6 Maa3 Gei3
- Directed by: Lee Chi-ngai
- Screenplay by: Lee Chi-ngai
- Produced by: Claudia Chung; Lee Chi-ngai; Cheung Chi-kwong
- Starring: Tony Leung; Ekin Cheng; Kelly Chen; Eric Tsang; Wong Cho-lam
- Cinematography: Wade Muller
- Edited by: Shirley Yip
- Music by: Youki Yamomoto
- Production companies: Edko Films; Sil-Metropole Organisation; Bona Film Group; United Filmmakers Organisation
- Distributed by: Edko Films
- Release date: 27 March 2014
- Country: Hong Kong
- Language: Cantonese
- Box office: US$565,869

Horseplay is a 2014 Hong Kong action comedy film directed by Lee Chi-ngai and starring Tony Leung, Ekin Cheng and Kelly Chen. The film's Cantonese and Mandarin theme song, Why Not Tonight (不如今晚) and The Best Night (最好的夜晚) respectively, was adapted from Henry Mancini's It Had Better Be Tonight with Leung, Cheng and Chen performing. Leung and Chen performed the Mandarin version at the 2014 CCTV Lunar New Year Evening on 30 January 2014.

== Plot ==
While interviewing for a relics smuggling case in London, television hostess Ha Mui (Kelly Chen) meets multi-faced thief Nine-Tailed Fox (Tony Leung) and washed out police detective Cheung Ho (Ekin Cheng). One wants to reveal the truth, one wants to steal the "Tang dynasty Pottery Horse" and one wants to bring criminals to justice. The three of them have different goals, but they must work together to acquire the pottery. Meanwhile, Nine-Tailed Fox is being hunted down by an old enemy and must evade capture. What will be the final outcome?

== Cast ==
- Tony Leung Ka-fai as Lee Tan (李旦), known as the Nine-Tailed Fox (九尾狐), a multi-faced thief
- Ekin Cheng as Cheung Ho (張浩), a police officer and Ha Mui's boyfriend
- Kelly Chen as Ha Mui (夏梅), a television hostess
- Eric Tsang as Mr. Round (尚環), an antique appraisal expert
- Wong Cho-lam as Tung Yin (董燕), an antique appraisal expert and Heung's junior
- Wang Ziyi as Butch, Lee Tan's apprentice
- Wang Shuo as Chen Jun (陳俊)
- Mandy Lieu as Twin assassins
- Liu Kai-chi as Officer Wong (黃Sir), Cheung's ex-superior
- Stephanie Che as Eva Lam (林綺華), a television hostess and Ha's friend
- Luisa Maria Leitão as Ping (萍), host of the "Star Trackers"
- Jeannie Chan as Lee Tan's daughter
- Martin Goga as main dancer
- Predrag Bjelac as Gypsy King, owner of an attraction at the Amusement Park in Prague.

== Production ==
Horseplay was filmed on location in Prague and London. While filming a motorcycle crashing scene, Tony Leung encountered an accident where he fractured three rib bones. Due to his injury, Leung, who was scheduled to film his first TVB series Line Walker, had to withdraw from the series.

== Theme song ==
- Why Not Tonight (不如今晚) (Cantonese) / The Best Night (最好的夜晚) (Mandarin)
  - Composer: Henry Mancini
  - Arranger: Ted Lo
  - Lyricist: Abrahim Chan
  - Producer: Mark Lui
  - Singer: Tony Leung Ka-fai, Ekin Cheng, Kelly Chen
