= Grace & Charm =

Studio album by Kelly Chen
- Released: 22 December 2004
- Genre: Cantopop Mandapop
- Language: Cantonese
- Label: Go East Entertainment

Kelly Chen chronology
Stylish Index (2004)	Grace & Charm (2004)	Eternal Sunshine 我是陽光的 (2005)

Grace & Charm is Hong Kong Cantopop singer Kelly Chen's Cantonese studio album. It was released on 22 December 2004 by Go East Entertainment with a VCD containing two music videos, "紙醉金迷" (Lost In Paradise) and "情人戰" (Lovers' War). The album features nine new Cantonese tracks and a Mandarin version of the track "完美關係" (Perfect Relationship). The lead single of the album, "紙醉金迷" (Lost In Paradise) was the theme song for Chen's Lost In Paradise Live Concert Tour on 24 December 2004 at Hong Kong Coliseum. Several songs from the album were used in promotional campaigns: "情人戰" (Lovers' War) was the theme song for Asia Game Show in 2004, and "完美關係" (Perfect Relationship) was the promotional song for Hong Kong–based jeweler 3D Gold for which Chen is also the spokesperson.

A second edition, Grace & Charm (2nd Edition) + Dae Jang Geum Soundtrack was released on 18 March 2005 with a bonus enhanced CD of original soundtrack of South Korean historical television drama Dae Jang Geum and its making of; and an audio visual CD (AVCD) that contains seven music videos and four audio tracks of the Cantonese version of the theme songs of Dae Jang Geum.

The track, "希望" (Hope) won one of the Top 10 Hit Song Awards at the 2005 Jade Solid Gold Best Ten Music Awards presented by Hong Kong television station TVB, one of the Metro Radio Hit Songs at the 2005 Metro Radio Hit Awards presented by Hong Kong radio station Metro Info, and won one of the Top 10 Gold Songs, as well as the first of three Worldwide Best Loved Cantonese Songs at the Hong Kong TVB8 Awards, presented by television station TVB8, in 2005.

== Track listings ==
1. "紙醉金迷" (Lost In Paradise) – theme song for Kelly Chen Lost In Paradise Tour
2. "情人戰" (Lovers' War) – theme song for 2004 Asia Game Show, Hong Kong
3. "前世" (Previous Life)
4. "紅絲帶" (Red Ribbon)
5. "柴門文的女人" (Fumi's Woman)
6. "完美關係" (Perfect Relationship)
7. "幅射" (Radiation)
8. "以退為進" (Retreat Then Forward)
9. "小女人" (Little Woman)
10. "完美關係" (Perfect Relationship) - Mandarin version

== AVCD ==
1. "希望" (Hope) MV
2. "前世" (Previous Life) MV
3. "紅絲帶" (Red Ribbon) MV
4. "完美關係" (Perfect Relationship) MV
5. "紙醉金迷" (Prosperous Surroundings) MV
6. "情人戰" (Lovers' War) MV
7. "完美關係" (Perfect Relationship) MV – Mandarin version
8. "希望" (Hope) – Kelly Chen – theme song of Dae Jang Geum
9. "思念" (Thinking of You) – Kelly Chen – insert song of Dae Jang Geum
10. "不配相擁" (Unworthy of Embracing) – Kelly Chen and Bowie Lam – insert song of Dae Jang Geum
11. "思念" (Thinking of You) – Bowie Lam – insert song of Dae Jang Geum

== CD 2 - Dae Jang Geum original soundtrack ==
1. "高原"
2. "蒼龍"
3. "何茫然" (Featuring Safina)
4. "呼喚 (Onara) II"
5. "空八一五"
6. "蓮實"
7. "德久"
8. "Hamangyeon" (Featuring Safina)
9. "APNA"
10. "父女情"
11. "悲"
12. "短歌"
13. "烟濤"
14. "呼喚 I"
15. "The Legend Becomes History"
16. "子夜吳歌" (Techno version)
17. "何茫然" (Instrumental)
