= An Empress and the Warriors =

2008 Hong Kong-Chinese film by Ching Siu-tung

- Theatrical release poster
- 江山美人
- Directed by: Ching Siu-tung
- Written by: James Yuen; Cheung Tan; Tin Nam-chun
- Produced by: Gin Lau; Claudie Chung; Don Yu
- Starring: Donnie Yen; Kelly Chen; Leon Lai
- Cinematography: Liu Zhangmu; Xie Zhe; Zhao Xiaoding
- Edited by: Tracy Hall; Chan Ki-hop; Poon Hung-yiu
- Music by: Mark Lui
- Production companies: United Filmmakers Organisation; China Film Co-Production; Beijing Polybona Film Publishing; Big Pictures
- Distributed by: Beijing Polybona Film Publishing
- Release date: 7 March 2008
- Running time: 99 minutes
- Countries: Hong Kong; China
- Language: Mandarin

An Empress and the Warriors (江山美人) is a 2008 Hong Kong–Chinese historical martial arts film directed by Ching Siu-tung, starring Donnie Yen, Kelly Chen, and Leon Lai. Set in ancient China during the Warring States period, the story follows a princess who is forced to step up to defend her kingdom from invasion after her father's death, with assistance from a loyal general and a hermit warrior whom she falls in love with.

== Synopsis ==
During the Warring States period, war breaks out between the Yan and Zhao kingdoms. The king of Yan is killed in battle, so the throne is passed to his daughter, Princess Fei'er. Together with the loyal general Murong Xuehu, the princess steps up to lead her people to defend the kingdom.

Fei'er's treacherous cousin Huba, who has been eyeing the throne, plots to have her assassinated. Seriously injured, Fei'er is saved by Duan Lanquan, a hermit warrior, and falls in love with him while recovering under his care. She returns to her kingdom later to thwart a Zhao invasion and make peace with Zhao. After that, she announces that she is giving up the throne to be with Duan Lanquan, but promises to return to serve Yan if her kingdom needs her.

Huba seizes the chance to usurp the throne and sends his men to kill Fei'er. Duan Lanquan dies of poisoning while saving Fei'er; Murong Xuehu is also killed by Huba's forces. When Fei'er finally returns to confront Huba, the latter reveals that he is actually responsible for her father's death. Fei'er engages Huba in a one-on-one duel and eventually slays him; Huba's followers surrender and pledge allegiance to Fei'er, and peace is restored in Yan.

== Cast ==
- Donnie Yen as Murong Xuehu
  - Harashima Daichi as Murong Xuehu (child)
- Kelly Chen as Princess Fei'er
  - Jiang Yiyi as Princess Fei'er (child)
- Leon Lai as Duan Lanquan
- Guo Xiaodong as Huba
- Kou Zhenhai as Teng Bochang
- Chen Zhihui as Diao Erbao
- Liu Weihua as the King of Yan
- Zhou Bo as Ao Jia
- Zhang Shan as the King of Zhao
- Yan Jie as the Prince of Zhao
