= Kelly Chen =

Hong Kong singer and actress

- 陳慧琳
- Chen in 2026
- Born: Vivian Chen Wai-man; 13 September 1972 (age 54); British Hong Kong
- Occupations: Singer; actress
- Years active: 1995–present
- Spouse: Alex Lau (m. 2008)
- Children: 2
- Musical career
- Also known as: Wai-lam Chan; Kelly Chan
- Origin: Hong Kong
- Genres: Mandopop; cantopop; electronic; R&B
- Instrument: Vocals
- Labels: Go East Entertainment Company; Decca; Universal Music

Chinese name
- Traditional Chinese: 陳慧琳
- Simplified Chinese: 陈慧琳
Transcriptions
Standard Mandarin
- Hanyu Pinyin: Chén Huìlín
Yue: Cantonese
- Jyutping: Can4 Wai6 Lam4

Birth name
- Traditional Chinese: 陳慧汶
- Simplified Chinese: 陈慧汶
Transcriptions
Standard Mandarin
- Hanyu Pinyin: Chén Huì Wèn
Yue: Cantonese
- Jyutping: Can4 Wai6 Man4

Kelly Chen Wai-lam (born Vivian Chen Wai-man on 13 September 1972) is a Hong Kong singer and actress. She has been referred to as a "Diva of Asia" (Chinese: 亞洲天后; lit. 'Asia's Heavenly Queen'). Chen has great success in the East Asian entertainment industry with nearly 20 million record sales of 38 albums.

According to Oriental Daily News, Chen was the highest earning female Hong Kong celebrity of 2014, earning 83 million HKD (US$10.7 million).

== Early life ==
Chen was born Vivian Chen Wai-man on 13 September 1972 in Hong Kong. Her father was a jewelry merchant and her mother was a housewife. She attended Canadian Academy International School in Kobe, Japan, for high school.. She graduated from Parsons School of Design in New York.

== Career ==
=== Early career ===
In 1994, while still a student at Parsons, Chen made two commercials, one for Shanghai Beer and one for the Bank of Hong Kong.

Chen returned to Hong Kong in 1994. She was introduced to an acquaintance who owned a production studio and was chosen to feature in a Jacky Cheung music video.

Chen made her film debut in Whatever Will Be, Will Be (仙樂飄飄) and sang the film's theme song. In September 1995, Chen performed the song "Mou Tian" composed by composer Steve Barakatt then released a compilation album, Break the Sky, with three other singers, and then her first Cantonese album, Intoxicated Lover (醉迷情人), in December. It was a success in Hong Kong and furthered her acting and musical career.

In 1996, Chen released her first Mandarin language album, I Don't Think So (我不以為), in, Taiwan, Malaysia, and Singapore, which sold over 150,000. Following the album's success, she produced another Cantonese CD in October 1996, Wind, Flower, Snow (風花雪). "Wind, Flower, Snow" is a very popular song in Hong Kong. In November 1996, Chen released her first Cantonese single, "Traveler". in Japan That year also saw her first stint as a Japanese singer when she released two Japanese singles.

In 1997, Chen performed her first ever concert, Starry Dream of Love (星夢情真), and released the partner CD in June, which sold over 100,000 copies in Hong Kong. She held three concerts in Hong Kong in June, named the Kelly Starry Dream of Love Concert (陳慧琳星夢情真演唱會). In July, she released "The beginning is a cunning morning", first Japanese single and her first Japan-based hit. Chen also provided the voice of Madame Trunk in the animated movie A Chinese Ghost Story. In the course of five months, Chen released four albums. With the releases of her second Mandarin album, Insight (體會), the compilation Kelly's Best Collection 97, the live CD Starring Dream of Love Live in Concert, and her next Cantonese CD A Movie (一齣戲). Insight sold 1.34 million in East Asia. Chen had established herself as a popular singer and actor in East Asia.

In 1998, Chen embarked the Kelly Starry Dream of Love World Tour (陳慧琳星夢情真世界巡迴演唱會), starting in Australia. Besides the world tour, Chen performed ten concerts for school children in Taiwan. She released her Mandarin album, Love Me Or Not (愛我不愛), the hit single of which, "Diary" (記事本), is well-known all over Asia and became her signature song so far. This album sold over 2 million copies in Asia. Chen boosted her status as a Chinese pop music diva in Asia entertainment industry.

In 1999, she starred in the television drama Don't Be a Cry Baby with Japanese star Kyoko Fukada; performing two concerts in Fukuoka, Japan in 1999, Chen increased her Japanese fanbase. She released a new album, Love of Colours, which sold 150,000 in Hong Kong from 9 December 1999 to 2000, and was the best selling album in 2000. She also won "The most popular female artist" in 1999 Jade Solid Gold Best Ten Music Awards Presentation.

In 2001, Chen released her remix album Kelly BPM Dance Collection in March, which sold over 150,000 copies. She embarked on the Paisley Galaxy World Tour (陳慧琳花花宇宙世界巡迴演唱會), which started out with one show in Singapore and two shows in Genting Highlands in Malaysia. (She broke the record of best-selling Hong Kong singers' concerts in Malaysia.) Chen went to North America, where she performed concerts in Chicago, Atlantic City, Los Angeles and Toronto all as a part of her world tour in May. She later toured China where she performed in Guangzhou, Huizhou, Zhongshan, Chengdu, Shanghai and Beijing. She released a Mandarin album, Flying (飛吧), in August. It was among the top 20 best-selling albums in Taiwan in 2001. Chen's movie Calmi Cuori Appassionati (冷靜與熱情之間), released in November 2001, grossed more than 30 billion yen (HKD$220,000,000) in Japan. The film broke the pre-sale ticket record in Japan and was ranked as the 67th best-selling movie in Japanese box office history. It was ranked at 98th best-selling movie in 2006 in Japan's box office history. Chen won "Asian Pacific Most Popular Hong Kong Female Artist" at the 2001 Jade Solid Gold Best Ten Music Awards Presentation.

=== Stabilizing career ===
In 2002, Chen released her first Japanese album, Grace, in January, selling over 50,000 copies in Japan. She released her Cantonese album Ask Kelly that February. The single "Blessed" (有福氣) was very popular in Hong Kong. She released her Mandarin album Love is coming (愛情來了) in May and held one concert in Taoyuan, Taiwan, named "Kelly Chen Love is Coming Concert" (陳慧琳愛情來了演唱會). She held 12 shows in Hong Kong in July, named "Kelly Dynacarnival World Tour, Hong Kong" (陳慧琳飛天舞會演唱會). She held a show called "Kelly Dynacarnival World Tour" (陳慧琳飛天舞會世界巡迴演唱會) in Sydney and Melbourne in September. In November, she released her Mandarin album(new+bes) Shining Colourful (閃亮每一天). She held her "Kelly Dynacarnival World Tour" in Singapore and Kuala Lumpur in December. The Republic of Liberia issued stamps commemorating her in December. Chen won "Asian Pacific Most Popular Hong Kong Female Artist" at the 2002 Jade Solid Gold Best Ten Music Awards Presentation and "Best Dressed 31st Awards" held by the Japanese government.

She held her "Kelly Dynacarnival World Tour" in San Francisco, Atlantic City and Toronto in April 2003. She released her Mandarin album You Don't Mean It (心口不一) and Cantonese album Love (愛) in August. You Don't Mean It sold over 800,000 in Asia. Chen again won the "Asian Pacific Most Popular Hong Kong Female Artist" award at the 2003 Jade Solid Gold Best Ten Music Awards Presentation.

She became the first Asian spokesperson for Dior in May 2004.

She released her Cantonese album Stylish Index. She was chosen as "Famous Outstanding Young Persons of the World" (2004年度世界傑出青年) by Junior Chamber International in October 2004. She held ten shows in Hong Kong in December, named "Kelly Lost in Paradise World Tour, Hong Kong" (陳慧琳紙醉金迷演唱會) and also released her Cantonese album Grace & Charm. She was also voted "CCTV Most Popular Female Singer " (第七屆中央電視台音樂電視大賽港澳臺及海外華語歌壇最受歡迎女歌手) by forty-five million Chinese people in 2004.

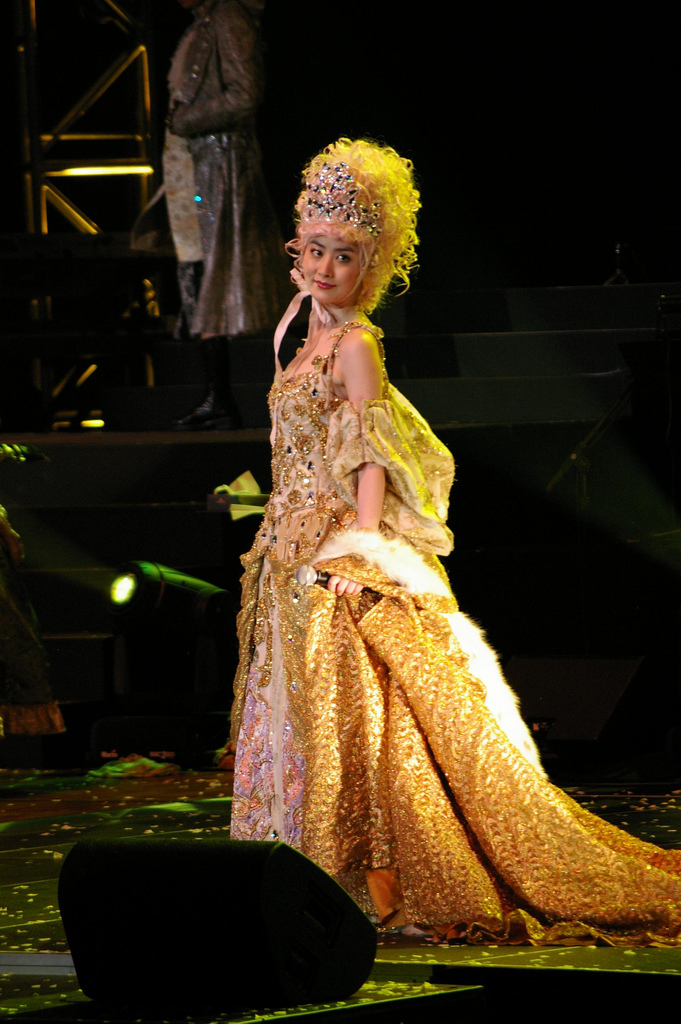
Chen performing in 2006

In 2005, her song "Hope" (希望) from the Korean TV series Dae Jang Geum (大長今) was popular in Hong Kong and mainland China. "Hope" improved her earnings as well as the company promoting her at the time. At the TVB 8 Awards Presentation, Chen took home three awards for "Hope", including the Song Award, World's Most Popular Cantonese Song and Most Well-Liked Female Singer in mainland China. "Hope" was the top song of charts for 20 radio stations in China and had even set a high record for ringtone downloads. A month after the initial launch, there were over three million downloads and, to date, the accumulated figure is over 6 million. As such, her record company earned $5 million after deductions. Universal Music Group's managing director called Chen to inform her of the good news. Chen had promised that if the number of downloads were to go over ten million, she will distribute the earnings to the staff. She wrapped up her "Kelly Chen Lost in Paradise World Tour" (陳慧琳紙醉金迷世界巡迴演唱會) in 2005–2006 in Asia and North America (ten shows in Hong Kong, two shows in Genting Highlands in Malaysia, two shows in Sydney and Melbourne in Australia, 12 shows in Mainland China (two each in Shanghai and Guangzhou, one each in Nanjing, Wuhan, Harbin, Chongqing, Chengdu, Hangzhou, Changzhou, and Wuxi), three shows in the USA (two in Connecticut and one in Las Vegas), and one show in Toronto, Canada). "Lost in Paradise" lasted three hours and contained 35 songs from Chen's lengthy ten-year music career. Chen held 30 shows in the "Kelly Lost in Paradise World Tour".

Chen was ranked as the third highest-income artist (and the highest-income female artist), following Jackie Chan and Andy Lau, overall in the Greater China region from 2005 to 2007.

In 2008, Chen performed in the movie Empress and the Warriors (江山美人). She held six concerts in Hong Kong, named "Kelly Chen Love Fighters Concert 2008" (陳慧琳Love Fighters演唱會08). She announced to all the audiences that she would marry Alex Lau in her last concert on 18 June. Chen has turned down all the shows of the "Kelly Chen Love Fighters World Tour" (陳慧琳Love Fighters 世界巡迴演唱會) in China, Taiwan, Korea, USA, Canada, Malaysia, Singapore and Australia because she wanted to give birth. She performed in the closing ceremony of 2008 Beijing Summer Olympics.

=== 2009–present ===
In 2009, Chen was chosen as a "Young Global Leader" by the World Economic Forum in 2009.

Chen performed with Amei Cheung, in the opening ceremony of National Games of China.

After the birth of her children, Chen shifted her focus from her career to her family. Chen released Chasing Dreams (微光) on March 16, 2010, her first album since the birth of her first son in 2009. Chen's first major screen role since An Empress and the Warriors (2008) was as an entertainment TV anchor in Horseplay (2014).

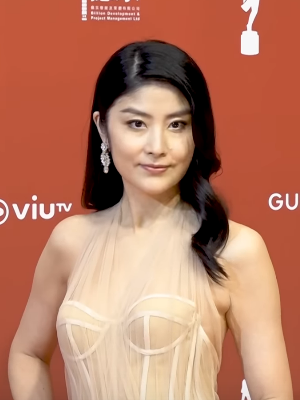
Chen in 2022

In 2023, Chen surprised her fans with a series of new songs, including "Eye of the Storm" (風眼), "Unconditional Love" (我的親人), "Price of Romance" (談情的價值) and "Knowledge of Love" (愛情常識).

== Personal life ==
Chen married long-term boyfriend, businessman Alex Lau Kin Ho, on 2 October 2008. Chen gave birth to her first son, Chace Lau, in July 2009. Chen had a miscarriage in 2011. Her second son Riley Lau was born in March 2012.

She is of Shanghai ancestry.

Chen speaks fluent Cantonese, and in various degrees of fluency, Mandarin, Japanese and English. She has an elder sister and a younger brother, singer Victor Chen Si-hon.

== Tours ==
- Wind, Flower, Snow Concert (1997–1998)
- Starry Dream of Love World Tour (1997–1998)
- Deep Impact Taiwan Tour (1998–1999)
- Paisley Galaxy World Tour (2000–2001)
- Dynacarnival World Tour (2002–2003)
- Lost in paradise World Tour (2004–2006)
- LOVE Fighters Concert (2008)
- Kelly Let's Celebrate! World Tour (2015–2016)
- Kelly Season Two World Tour (2023-2026)

== Philanthropy ==
Since 1998, Chen has been involved in charitable activities and has served as an ambassador for causes including environmental protection, education, and children. She was appointed a Hong Kong Goodwill Ambassador in 1998.

=== Environment ===
Chen was appointed Hong Kong Ambassador of Environment in 1998.

With Greenpeace, she has made commercials to promote awareness of environmental protection in 2006.

=== Education ===
In April 2002, she was appointed by the "Standing Committee on Language Education and Research" (SCOLAR) as the "Ambassador of The Workplace English Campaign" to encourage the working people to keep studying the English language as Chen herself had done.

After years of serving other funds, Chen started her own to help children: the Kelly Chen Children Education Fund raises money to help needy children. Besides performing her Dynacarnival concert in Hong Kong, Chen travelled to Sydney and Melbourne, Australia to perform. Chen was soon appointed by the Hong Kong Correctional Services Department as the "Ambassador of The Rehabilitation".

She was awarded two honours. First, she was chosen as one of Hong Kong's Ten Outstanding Young Persons 2002. That same year, she was invited to represent Hong Kong to attend the ABU Prizes – Presentation & Special Concert in the NHK Hall in Tokyo. She received the 13th Annual Best Dressed Award in Japan, becoming the first foreigner to receive the award. She was later invited by the Office of the Privacy Commissioner for Personal Data and HKSAR Government Health Department to film the publicity campaigns for promoting the respect of personal privacy and organ donation throughout China and Hong Kong.

=== Children's causes ===
She was appointed by UNICEF as the Honorable China Children's Health Ambassador. Chen was later appointed by the Hong Kong Girl Guides Association as "Girl Guides Millennium Goodwill Ambassador", which led her to visit Inner Mongolia to investigate the way young children were living and the health and food services they were receiving. In 2001, Chen added another title to her growing list as the Volunteer Ambassador 2001 as appointed by the Social Welfare Department. She was later appointed by UNICEF a second time as the Ambassador of The Hong Kong Committee For UNICEF.

=== Other charitable work ===
As an ambassador of the Hong Kong Red Cross, Chen promoted the donation of blood banks. She was an ambassador for the Independent Commission Against Corruption (ICAC).

March 2003 brought more titles Chen's way: she was appointed The Philatelic Ambassador by the Hong Kong Post, as well as "The Love And Peace Ambassador" by City Junior Chamber. Chen soon took her "Dynacarnival" to North America by performing in Atlantic City, Toronto and San Francisco. She began to release DSD versions of her earlier albums, including Dedicated Lover. She was later appointed as Star of "Hong Kong Outstanding Students Award" by Lion & Globe Educational Trust, furthering her push for better education. In June 2003, Chen's wax figure for the Madam Tussaud Wax Museum was ready and was put on display. She was later invited to be the "Love Ambassador" of "World Children's Day at McDonald's 2003" by McDonald's restaurants in Hong Kong. She was appointed as the "Pass-it-On" Ambassador by the Hong Kong Red Cross and attend its Christmas campaign to visit the John. F. Kennedy Center.

Chen's charitable work continued into 2004 as she was appointed as the star representative to attend the "5th HK Outstanding Teenagers" election press conference held by Hong Kong Playground Association and RTHK. In February, Chen was appointed as both "Road Safety Vision Ambassador" by the Road Safety Council to promote road safety, and as the "Reading Ambassador" by The Boys' and Girls' Clubs Association of Hong Kong. May 2004 brought the title of "Hospital Play Ambassador" to Chen, as well as the title of "Japanese Promotional Ambassador" by The Japan Society of HK, Consulate General of Japan and RTHK to encourage Hong Kong citizens to learn Japanese. Chen received another award when she was named "The Outstanding Young Persons of the World" in 2004 by the Junior Chamber International, becoming the first Hong Kong female celebrity to be honoured with the award.

In 2007, Chen was appointed as Hong Kong "Innovative Entrepreneur Ambassador" (創意創業大使) and had sung the theme song "Innovation" (創) for the "Innovative Entrepreneur of The Year 2007" (創意創業大賞2007) organised by City Junior Chamber 城市青年商會, Hong Kong. Chen's responsibility is to promote the awareness of entrepreneurship to youngsters and to attend the various promotion events organised. She also continued the support of Innovation Entrepreneur in 2008.

After completing her movie, An Empress and the Warriors with Leon Lai, Chen headed a concert, called "Love Fighters", at the HK Coliseum in June 2008. This was her biggest concert headline to date, which featured many sets and exotic choreography.

Chen donated $600,000 for the 2008 Sichuan earthquake.

== Media and public relations ==
In a survey conducted in 2002 by the City University of Hong Kong, Chen was voted "The Most Popular Idol" by local youth groups.

In 1997, Shiseido hired Chen to appear in their commercials; she was "depicted as [a] modern Asian [beauty], not quite identical yet not totally different from Japanese women." Chen was also chosen as the cover model for Ginza, a new monthly magazine targeted at women in their twenties.

== Discography ==
=== Studio albums ===
==== Hong Kong Cantonese ====
- Intoxicated Lover 醉迷情人 (December 1995)
- Wind, Flower, Snow 風花雪 (October 1996)
- Starry Dreams of Love 星夢情真 (June 1997)
- A Movie (Film By Kelly Chen) 一齣戲 (December 1997)
- Da De Dum (I Am Falling Out of Love) Da De Dum (我失戀) (July 1998)
- True Feeling 真感覺 (February 1999)
- Don't Stop Loving Me 繼續愛我 (August 1999)
- Paisley Galaxy 花花宇宙 (May 2000)
- The Big Day 大日子 (November 2000)
- In The Party (July 2001)
- ASK (19 December 2001)
- ASK KELLY (1 February 2002)
- Dynacarnival 飛天舞會 (12 July 2002)
- Baby Cat (13 December 2002)
- Love 愛 (22 August 2003)
- Stylish Index (23 July 2004)
- GRACE AND CHARM (22 December 2004)
- Happy Girl (25 August 2006)
- Kellylicious (16 May 2008)
- Reflection (7 February 2013)
- And Then (15 January 2016)
- Watch Me (20 July 2018)

==== Taiwanese Mandarin ====
- I Don't Think So 我不以為 (May 1996)
- Insight 體會 (August 1997)
- You're Not the Same 你不一樣 (March 1998)
- Love Me Or Not 愛我不愛 (December 1998)
- Love You So Much 愛你愛的 (April 2000)
- Flying 飛吧 (August 2001)
- Love Appeared 愛情來了 (10 May 2002)
- You Don't Mean It 心口不一 (1 August 2003)
- Eternal Sunshine 我是陽光的 (16 September 2005)
- Chasing Dreams 微光 (16 March 2010)

==== Japanese ====
- GRACE (29 January 2002)

== Filmography ==
- Whatever Will Be, Will Be (仙樂飄飄, 1995)
- The Age of Miracles (1995)
- Lost and Found (天涯海角, 1996)
- A Chinese Ghost Story: The Tsui Hark Animation (1997)
- Anna Magdalena (安娜瑪德蓮娜, 1998)
- Hot War (幻影特攻, 1998)
- Metade Fumaca (半支煙, 1999) – cameo
- Tokyo Raiders (東京攻略, 2000)
- And I Hate You So (小親親, 2000)
- Lavender (薰衣草, 2000)
- Calmi Cuori Appassionati (冷靜與熱情之間, 2001)
- Merry Go Round (初戀拿喳麵, 2001) – cameo
- Infernal Affairs (無間道, 2002)
- Infernal Affairs III (無間道 III, 2003)
- Breaking News (大事件, 2004)
- Super Model (我要做Model, 2004) – cameo
- McDull, the Alumni (春田花花同學會, 2006)
- It's a Wonderful Life (心想事成, 2007)
- An Empress and the Warriors (江山美人, 2008)
- 72 Tenants of Prosperity (72家租客, 2010)
- All's Well, Ends Well 2012 (八星抱喜, 2012)
- Tales from the Dark 1 (迷離夜之“放手”, 2013)
- The Monkey King (西遊記之大鬧天宮, 2014)
- Horseplay (盜馬記, 2014)
- An Inspector Calls (浮華宴, 2015)
- The Monkey King 2 (西遊記之孫悟空三打白骨精, 2016)
