= Love You So Much =

Studio album by Kelly Chen
- Released: Hong Kong, Taiwan: April 20, 2000
- Genres: Mandopop, psychedelic soul
- Length: 43:12

Singles from Love You So Much
- 1. "Hey, Anyone Out Here?(喂！有人在嗎？)" Released: October 30, 1999; 2. "If You Really Love Me(你若是真愛我)" Released: November 20, 1999; 3. "Unbelievable(不得了)" Released: June 20, 2000

Love You So Much is the fifth Mandarin studio album produced by Hong Kong–based singer Kelly Chen. It was released on April 20, 2000, by Go East Entertainment Company/Decca Records in Hong Kong and Taiwan, and reached number five on the IFPI Hong Kong chart on April 27, 2000.

Six singles were released from the album. The lead single, "Hey, Anyone Out Here? (喂！有人在嗎？)" is a psychedelic soul song and was released on September 10, 1999. It was unusual at the time to release a single of this genre (since Taiwanese people primarily listened to traditional sentimental ballads), and the single was not successful. The follow-up, "If You Really Love Me (你若是真愛我)", was a sentimental ballad which was also unsuccessful.

== Composition ==
Love You So Much is a pop ballads record and primarily consists of pop songs. The album integrates pop with influences from many different genres, including sentimental ballad, psychedelic soul, acid house, and electronica.

Lyrically, the album consists of songs that mainly talk about love and personal lives.

== Track listing ==
=== CD ===
No.	Title	Music	Lyrics	Arranger	Music supervisor	Notes
01	Love You So Much (愛你愛的)	Zuo An An	Zuo An An	屠穎	馬毓芬	
02	Care Too Much (對你太在乎)	吳國敬	厲曼婷	吳國敬、孫偉明	吳國敬	粵語原曲為《對你太在乎》
03	Yawning (打呵欠)	深白色	深白色	Martin Tang	馬毓芬	
04	We All Love You (我們都愛你)	Davy Chan	Albert Leung	劉志遠	Jim Lee	粵語版本為《一早想愛你》
05	Hey, Anyone Out Here? (喂！有人在嗎？)	雷頌德	林奕華	雷頌德	雷頌德	粵語原曲為雷頌德《喂！有人在嗎》
06	Shhh! (噓)	梁翹柏	Albert Leung	劉志遠	Jim Lee	
07	My Tender Will (溫柔意志力)	Chou Chuan-huing	陳家麗	吳慶隆	Chou Chuan-huing	
08	Get Rid Of You (戒掉你)	雷頌德	Albert Leung	雷頌德	雷頌德	
09	True Colors (最真的模樣)	雷頌德	于光中	雷頌德	雷頌德	粵語原曲為《真感覺》
10	If You Really Love Me (你若是真愛我)	深白色	深白色	Kit Ho	馬毓芬	

==== Taiwan Deluxe Celebration Edition: Bonus 5" CD single ====
No.	Title	Music	Lyrics	Arranger	Music supervisor	Notes
01	Unbelievable (不得了)	雷頌德	Albert Leung	雷頌德	雷頌德	第一主打 百事可樂全力贊助
02	Paisley Galaxy (花花宇宙)	雷頌德	Albert Leung	雷頌德	雷頌德	
03	Unbelievable（Karaoke Version） (不得了（百事歡唱版）)	雷頌德	Albert Leung	雷頌德	雷頌德	

== Release history ==
Region	Date	Format	Catalogue no.	Label	Ref.
Hong Kong	April 20, 2000	CD	70140, 8449402	Go East Entertainment	
Taiwan	April 20, 2000	CD Cassette	70140, 8449402	Decca Records	
Taiwan	June 20, 2000	CD	70140, 8449752, 70148	Decca Records	
