= Mark Lui =

Cantopop composer

- 雷頌德
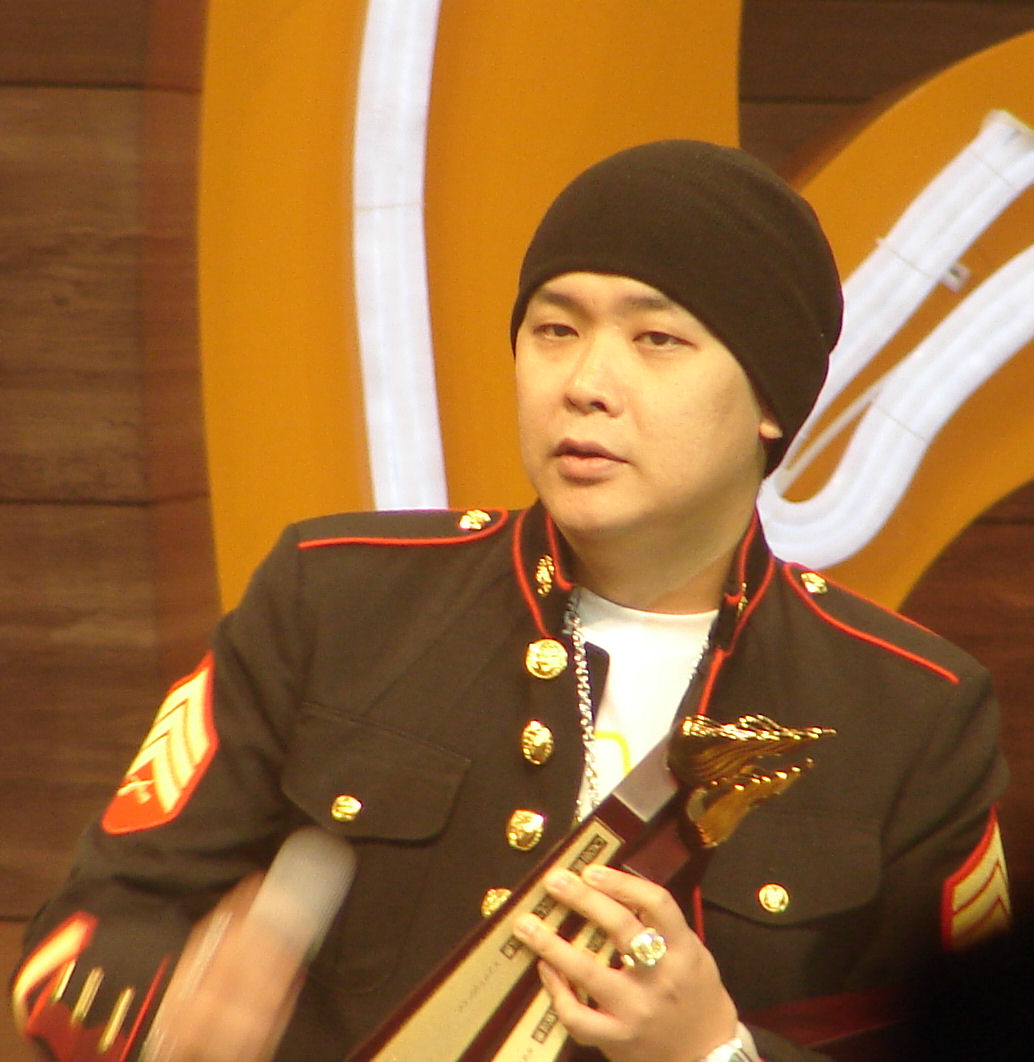
- Lui in 2007
- Born: 9 July 1969 (age 56); British Hong Kong
- Occupations: Composer; musician; arranger; songwriter; record producer; record executive; music director; lyricist; singer; actor; fashion designer
- Years active: 1992–present
- Notable work: Year 1995 Aaron Kwok's The Legend of Innocence 純真傳說; Year 1995 Kelly Chen's-Who Is Willing To Let Go 誰願放手; Year 1995 Kelly Chen's Everything is Beautiful Because of You 一切很美只因有你; Year 1996 Leon Lai's Words of Love Not Yet Spoken 情深說話未曾講; Year 2000 Kelly Chen's Paisley Galaxy 花花宇宙; Year 2001 Miriam Yeung's Wild Child 野孩子; Year 2002 Miriam Yeung's Unfortunately, I'm Aquarius 可惜我是水瓶座; Year 2002 Candy Lo's Break-Up With Good Intentions 好心分手; Year 2003 Alan Tam and Hacken Lee's Neighbours 左鄰右里; Year 2004 Miriam Yeung's Small City Big Event 小城大事
- Spouse: Jade Chinese: 梁家玉
- Children: Jack Chinese: 雷鳴; Jazz Chinese: 雷響

Chinese name
- Traditional Chinese: 雷頌德
- Simplified Chinese: 雷颂德
Transcriptions
Standard Mandarin
- Hanyu Pinyin: Léi Sòng Dé
Yue: Cantonese
- Jyutping: leoi4 zung6 dak1
- Musical career
- Also known as: Mark
- Genres: Cantopop, Britpop
- Instruments: Vocals, guitar, piano, keyboards
- Labels: Gold; Amusic (2011–present)
- Website: www.amusic.hk

Mark Lui (Chinese: 雷頌德, born 9 July 1969) is from Hong Kong. He is a composer and producer of Cantopop music with the "On Your Mark" creative team, and part of the Artists and Repertoire team at East Asia Record Production Co., Ltd.

Notable works include singers Hacken Lee and Alan Tam's "Neighbours" (Chinese: 左鄰右里), Leon Lai's "Words of Love Not Yet Spoken" (Chinese: 情深說話未曾講), Kelly Chen's "Everything is Beautiful Because of You" (Chinese: 一切很美只因有你), "Paisley Galaxy " (Chinese: 花花宇宙), etc.

He is also a Fashion Designer with COOLDAY, SIR – A Today Is Cool Fashion Brand Solo Shop.
