= List of Hong Kong films of 2010 =

This article lists feature-length Hong Kong films released in 2010.

== Box office ==
The highest-grossing Hong Kong films released in 2010 by domestic box office gross revenue, are as follows:

Highest-grossing films released in 2010
Rank	Title	Domestic gross
1	Ip Man 2	HK$43,313,345
2	72 Tenants of Prosperity	HK$34,447,831
3	Echoes of the Rainbow	HK$23,133,269
4	All's Well, Ends Well 2010	HK$15,544,970
5	Legend of the Fist: The Return of Chen Zhen	HK$13,688,567
6	The Stool Pigeon	HK$12,653,103
7	Detective Dee and the Mystery of the Phantom Flame	HK$11,257,097
8	Break Up Club	HK$10,333,691
9	The Child's Eye	HK$8,651,506
10	Marriage With A Liar	HK$8,340,718

== Releases ==
Title	Director	Cast	Genre	Notes
14 Blades	Daniel Lee	Donnie Yen, Zhao Wei	Martial arts	In theaters 4 February 2010
72 Tenants of Prosperity	Eric Tsang; Patrick Kong	Eric Tsang, Jacky Cheung, Anita Yuen, Bosco Wong, Stephy Tang, Linda Chung, Wong Cho Lam, Michael Tse, Charmaine Sheh, Gordon Lam, Raymond Lam, Fala Chen	Comedy / drama	In theaters 11 February 2010
All About Love	Ann Hui	Sandra Ng, Vivian Chow, William Chan, Cheung Siu-fai, Jo Kuk, Joey Meng	Romance	In theaters 26 August 2010
All's Well, Ends Well 2010	Raymond Wong; Herman Yau	Raymond Wong, Sandra Ng, Louis Koo, Ronald Cheng, Lynn Hung, Angelababy, Pan Yueming, Lee Heung Kam, Kenneth Ng, Lam Suet, Crystal Tin	Comedy	In theaters 11 February 2010
Amphetamine	Scud	Byron Pang, Thomas Price, Winnie Leung, Linda So, Simon Tam, Eva Lo	Romance / Drama	In theaters 8 April 2010; Entered into the 2010 Berlin International Film Festival; Entered into the 2010 Hong Kong International Film Festival
Bad Blood	Dennis Law	Simon Yam, Bernice Liu, Andy On, Jiang Luxia, Ken Lo, Chan Wai-Man, Xiong Xin Xin, Pinky Cheung, Lai Lok-Yi, Amy Chum, Wong Tin-Lam, Cheung Siu-fai, Lam Suet	Martial Arts / Crime	In theaters 21 January 2010
Beauty on Duty	Wong Jing	Charlene Choi, Benz Hui, Sandra Ng, Fan Siu-Wong	Comedy	In theaters 1 April 2010
Black Ransom	Wong Jing; Venus Keung	Simon Yam, Michael Miu, Fala Chen, Andy On, Liu Yang, Kenny Wong, Vincent Wong, Qu Ying, Hiromi Wada, Ada Wong, Xing Yu	Crime / Action	In theaters 7 January 2010
Break Up Club	Wong Chun-Chun	Jaycee Chan, Fiona Sit, Patrick Tang, Hiro Hayama, Bonnie Sin	Romance / Comedy	In theaters 16 June 2010
Bruce Lee, My Brother	Raymond Yip; Manfred Man	Aarif Lee, Tony Leung, Christy Chung	Biopic / Drama	In theaters 25 November 2010
The Butcher, the Chef and the Swordsman	Wuershan	Masanobu Andō, Kitty Zhang, You Benchang	Action comedy	
The Child's Eye	Pang brothers	Elanne Kong, Rainie Yang	Horror	In theaters 14 October 2010
City Under Siege	Benny Chan	Aaron Kwok, Shu Qi, Collin Chou, Wu Jing, Zhang Jingchu	Sci-fi / Action	In theaters 12 August 2010
CJ7: The Cartoon	Toe Yuen	Xu Jiao, Shi Renmao, Dong Jie, Huang Lei, Wu Gang, Fung Ming Han	Animation / Comedy	In theaters 9 July 2010
Crossing Hennessy	Ivy Ho	Jacky Cheung, Tang Wei, Danny Lee Sau-Yin, Paw Hee-Ching, Maggie Cheung Ho-Yee, Andy On	Romance	In theaters 1 April 2010; Entered into the 2009 Cannes Film Festival; Entered into the 2010 Hong Kong International Film Festival
Curse of the Deserted	Law Chi-Leung	Shawn Yue, Kitty Zhang	Thriller / Horror	In theaters 26 August 2010
Detective Dee and the Mystery of the Phantom Flame	Tsui Hark	Andy Lau, Carina Lau, Li Bingbing	Martial Arts / Mystery	In theaters 30 September 2010
Dream Home	Pang Ho-Cheung	Josie Ho, Eason Chan, Derek Tsang	Slasher film	
The Drunkard	Freddie Wong	Chang Kuo-chu, Irene Wan, Joman Chiang	Drama	In theaters 25 November 2010; Entered into the 2010 Hong Kong Asian Film Festival
Echoes of the Rainbow	Alex Law	Simon Yam, Sandra Ng	Drama	In theaters 11 March 2010; Entered into the 2010 Berlin International Film Festival
Ex	Heiward Mak	Gillian Chung, William Chan, Michelle Wai, Derek Tsang, Chapman To, Lawrence Chou, Jacky Heung	Romance	In theaters 10 June 2010; Entered into the 2010 Hong Kong International Film Festival
The Fantastic Water Babes	Jeffrey Lau	Gillian Chung, Alex Fong, Huang Shengyi, Stephen Fung, Tian Liang, Chrissie Chau	Action / Comedy	In theaters 15 July 2010
Fire of Conscience	Dante Lam	Leon Lai, Richie Ren, Wang Baoqiang, Liu Kai-Chi, Vivian Hsu, Michelle Ye, Charles Ying, Wilfred Lau	Action / Adventure / Thriller	In theaters 1 April 2010
Forget Me Not	Albert Mak	Grace Yip, Raymond Wong Ho-yin, Carl Ng, Elena Kong, Wayne Lai	Horror	
Frozen	Derek Kwok	Janice Vidal, Janice Man, Aarif Lee	Romance	In theaters 2 September 2010
Future X-Cops	Wong Jing	Andy Lau, Barbie Shu, Mike He, Xu Jiao, Fan Bingbing, Fan Siu-Wong	Action / Crime	In theaters 15 April 2010
Gallants	Derek Kwok; Clement Cheng	Leung Siu-Lung, Chen Kuan-tai, Teddy Robin, Chan Wai-Man, Wong You-Nam, JJ Jia, Jin Auyeung	Martial arts / Comedy	In theaters 3 June 2010; Entered into the 2010 Hong Kong International Film Festival
Girl$	Kenneth Bi	Michelle Wai, Bonnie Sin, Una Lin, Deep Ng, Venus Wong, Tsang Kwok-Cheung, Karson Lok, Eric Tse	Drama	In theaters 2 September 2010; Entered into the 2010 Hong Kong International Film Festival
Hot Summer Days	Chan Kwok Fai; Wing Shya	Nicholas Tse, Jacky Cheung, Daniel Wu, Gordon Liu, Rene Liu, Vivian Hsu, Barbie Shu, Duan Yihong, Fu Xinbo, Jing Boran, Angelababy	Romance / Comedy	In theaters 18 February 2010
Ip Man 2	Wilson Yip	Donnie Yen, Sammo Hung	Martial arts / Action / Biography	In theaters 29 April 2010
The Jade and the Pearl	Chun Siu Chun	Charlene Choi, Raymond Lam, Joey Yung, Wong Cho-lam, Chapman To	Romance / Comedy	In theaters 5 August 2010
Just Another Pandora's Box	Jeffrey Lau	Ronald Cheng, Gigi Leung, Betty Sun, Athena Chu, Gillian Chung, Eric Tsang, Patrick Tam, Huang Bo, Guo Degang	Comedy	In theaters 18 March 2010
La Comédie humaine	Chan Hing-Ka; Janet Chun	Chapman To, Wong Cho Lam, Benz Hui, Fiona Sit, Kama Lo	Comedy / Action	In theaters 8 July 2010; Entered into the 2010 Hong Kong International Film Festival
The Legend is Born – Ip Man	Herman Yau	Yuen Biao, To Yu Hang, Sammo Hung, Fan Siu-Wong	Martial arts / Action	In theaters 24 June 2010
Legend of the Fist: The Return of Chen Zhen	Andrew Lau	Donnie Yen, Anthony Wong, Shu Qi	Action / Adventure / Martial arts	In theaters 23 September 2010
Little Big Soldier	Ding Sheng	Jackie Chan, Leehom Wang	Action / Comedy	In theaters 25 February 2010
Love in a Puff	Pang Ho-Cheung	Miriam Yeung, Shawn Yue, Cheung Tat-Ming	Romance / Drama	In theaters 25 March 2010
Lover's Discourse	Derek Tsang; Jimmy Wan	Eason Chan, Karena Lam, Kay Tse, Eddie Peng, Jacky Heung, Eric Tsang, Kit Chan, William Chan, Carlos Chan, Mavis Fan	Romance	In theaters 6 January 2011; Entered into the 2010 Pusan International Film Festival
Marriage with a Liar	Patrick Kong	Chrissie Chau, Him Law, Carol Yeung, Timmy Hung, King Kong, Charmaine Fong, Jacquline Chong	Romance	In theaters 23 December 2010
Merry-Go-Round	Clement Cheng; Yan Yan Mak	Ella Koon, Teddy Robin, Nora Miao, Lawrence Chou, Denise Ho, Joe Cheung, Siu Yam-yam, Wilfred Lau	Drama	In theaters 11 November 2010; Entered into the 2010 Hong Kong Asian Film Festival; Entered into the 2010 Vancouver International Film Festival
Ocean Heaven	Xue Xiaolu	Jet Li, Wen Zhang, Gwei Lun-mei	Drama	In theaters 24 June 2010
Once a Gangster	Felix Chong	Ekin Cheng, Jordan Chan, Alex Fong, Michelle Ye, Candice Yu, Wilfred Lau	Action / Adventure / Comedy	In theaters 20 May 2010
Perfect Wedding	Barbara Wong	Miriam Yeung, Raymond Lam, Eric Kot, Teresa Mo, Pierre Ngo, Kate Tsui, Bernice Liu, Richard Ng, Tats Lau, Ken Hung, Kathy Yuen, Sharon Luk, Ella Koon	Romance	In theaters 21 October 2010
Revenge: A Love Story	Wong Ching-po	Juno Mak, Sora Aoi	Action / Crime	In theaters 2 December 2010; Entered into the 2010 Hong Kong Asian Film Festival
The Stool Pigeon	Dante Lam	Nicholas Tse, Nick Cheung, Gwei Lun-mei, Liu Kai-chi, Miao Pu, Lu Yi, Sherman Chung	Action / Thriller	In theaters 26 August 2010
Triple Tap	Derek Yee	Louis Koo, Daniel Wu, Charlene Choi, Li Bingbing, Chapman To	Action / Crime	In theaters 1 July 2010
True Legend	Yuen Woo-ping	Vincent Zhao, Michelle Yeoh, Jay Chou, Zhou Xun	Martial arts / Drama	In theaters 11 February 2010
Edmond Poon Twilight in Bangkok			Horror / Documentary	
Vampire Warriors	Dennis Law	Yuen Wah, Jiang Luxia, Chrissie Chau, Chin Siu-ho	Martial arts / Fantasy	In theaters 11 November 2010
Womb Ghosts	Dennis Law	Chrissie Chau, Lam Suet, Koni Lui, Chris Lai	Horror	In theaters 18 March 2010
