= List of awards and nominations received by Miriam Yeung =

Miriam Yeung awards and nominations
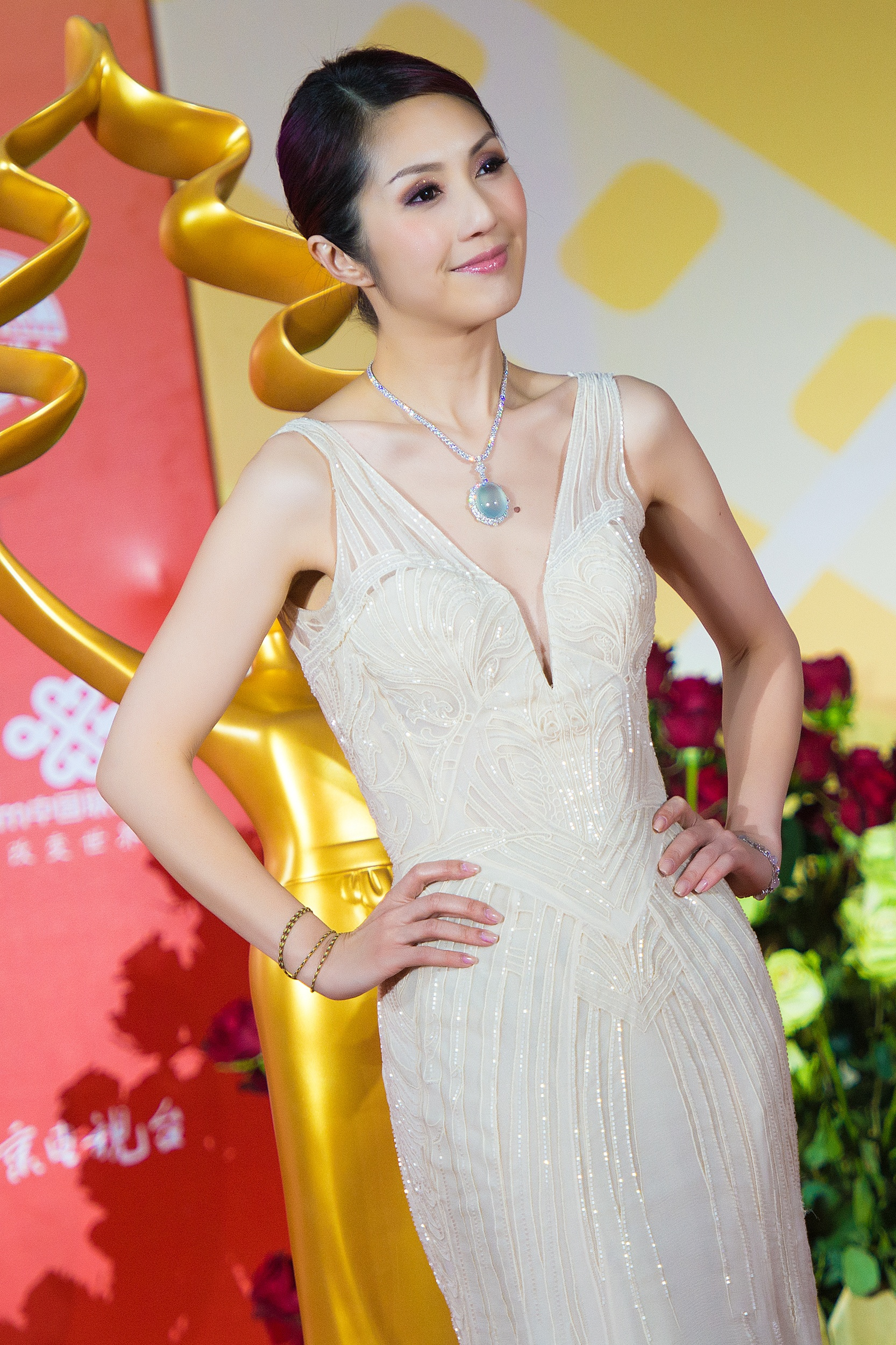
- Yeung in 2014
Award	Won
Commercial Radio Hong Kong Ultimate Song Chart Awards	24
IFPI Hong Kong Sales Award	1
Jade Solid Gold Top 10 Awards	20
Metro Showbiz Hit Awards Awards	36
Metro Radio Mandarin Music Awards	2
RTHK Top 10 Gold Songs Awards	25
Sprite Music Awards	4
- Total
Awards won	112

Miriam Yeung is a Hong Kong singer and actress. She has won numerous awards since her debut in 1995.

== Acting-related ==
=== Film ===
Year	Award	Category	Nominated work	Result
2004	9th Golden Bauhinia Awards	Best Actress	Sound of Colors	Nominated
2005	42nd Golden Horse Awards	Best Actress	Drink-Drank-Drunk	Nominated
2008	15th Hong Kong Film Critics Society Awards	Best Actress	Hooked on You	Nominated
2010	17th Hong Kong Film Critics Society Awards	Best Actress	Perfect Wedding	Won
2010	17th Hong Kong Film Critics Society Awards	Best Actress	Love in a Puff	Nominated
2011	30th Hong Kong Film Awards	Best Actress	Love in a Puff	Nominated
2013	32nd Hong Kong Film Awards	Best Actress	Love in the Buff	Won
2013	2013 Huading Awards	Best Actress in a Motion Picture	Love in the Buff	Nominated
2016	22nd Hong Kong Film Critics Society Awards	Best Actress	Little Big Master	Nominated
2016	35th Hong Kong Film Awards	Best Actress	Little Big Master	Nominated
2016	23rd Beijing College Student Film Festival	Favorite Actress	Little Big Master	Won
2018	23rd Huading Awards	Best Actress	Love Off the Cuff	Nominated
2018	25th Beijing College Student Film Festival	Best Actress	Love Off the Cuff	Nominated

=== Television ===
Year	Award	Category	Nominated work	Result
2001	2001 TVB Anniversary Awards	Most Popular On-Screen Couple (with Raymond Lam)	A Taste of Love	Nominated
2020	2019 TVB Anniversary Awards	Most Popular Female Character	Wonder Woman	Won

== Music-related ==
=== Commercial Radio Hong Kong Ultimate Song Chart Awards ===
The Ultimate Song Chart Awards Presentation (叱咤樂壇流行榜頒獎典禮) is a cantopop award ceremony from one of the famous channel in Commercial Radio Hong Kong known as Ultimate 903 (FM 90.3). Unlike other cantopop award ceremonies, this one is judged based on the popularity of the song/artist on the actual radio show.

Yeung has won eleven of these awards since 1994 including a gold for Ultimate Female Artist in 2004.

Year	Award	Work	Result	Ref.
1996	Ultimate New Popular Female Artist	Miriam Yeung	Bronze Award	
1998	Ultimate Female Artist	Miriam Yeung	Bronze Award	
1999	Ultimate Top 10 Songs	抬起我的頭來	Won (#4)	
1999	Ultimate Female Artist	Miriam Yeung	Silver Award	
2000	Ultimate Top 10 Songs	Teenage Girl Prayer (少女的祈禱)	Won (#7)	
2000	Ultimate Female Artist	Miriam Yeung	Gold Award	
2001	Ultimate Top 10 Songs	Sister (姊妹)	Won (#2)	
2002	Ultimate Female Artist	Miriam Yeung	Gold Award	
2002	Ultimate My Favorite Female Artist	Miriam Yeung	Won	
2003	Ultimate Female Artist	Miriam Yeung	Silver Award	
2004	Ultimate Top 10 Songs	Small City (小城大事)	Won (#2)	
2004	Ultimate Female Artist	Miriam Yeung	Gold Award	
2004	Ultimate Album	电光幻影	Won	
2005	Ultimate Top 10 Songs	Woman Martyr (烈女)	Won (#6)	
2005	Ultimate Female Artist	Miriam Yeung	Bronze Award	
2005	Ultimate My Favorite Female Artist	Miriam Yeung	Won	
2006	Ultimate My Favorite Female Artist	Miriam Yeung	Won	
2007	Ultimate My Favorite Female Artist	Miriam Yeung	Won	
2008	Ultimate Top 10 Songs	撈月亮的人	Won	
2009	Ultimate Top 10 Songs	原來過得很快樂	Won	
2009	Ultimate My Favorite Female Artist	Miriam Yeung	Won	
2010	Ultimate Top 10 Songs	I am Me (我係我)	Won	
2010	Ultimate Female Artist	Miriam Yeung	Bronze Award	
2010	Ultimate My Favorite Female Artist	Miriam Yeung	Won	

=== IFPI Hong Kong Sales Awards ===
IFPI Awards is given to artists base on the sales in Hong Kong at the end of the year.

Year	Award	Work	Result	Ref.
2001	Top Selling Cantonese Album	Miriam	Won	

=== Jade Solid Gold Top 10 Awards ===
The Jade Solid Gold Songs Awards Ceremony(十大勁歌金曲頒獎典禮) is held annually in Hong Kong since 1984. The awards are based on Jade Solid Gold show on TVB. Yeung won the "Most Popular Female Artist" award twice and in 2010, she won "Asia's Most Popular Female Artist", which is one of the most prestigious awards in JSG.

Year	Award	Work	Result	Ref.
1997	The Outstanding Artist	Miriam Yeung	Bronze Award	
1998	The Top Commercial Song	大激想	Won	
1998	Best Packaging Album	<< 1 to 100 >>	Silver Award	
1998	The Outstanding Artist	Miriam Yeung	Silver Award	
1999	The Top 10 Songs	抬起我的頭來	Won	
1999	The Outstanding Artist	Miriam Yeung	Silver Award	
2000	The Top 10 Songs	Teenage Girl Prayer (少女的祈禱)	Won	
2000	The Gold Song	Teenage Girl Prayer (少女的祈禱)	Won	
2001	The Top 10 Songs	Sister (姊妹)	Won	
2002	The Top 10 Songs	Miriam (楊千嬅)	Won	
2002	Most Popular Female Artist	Miriam Yeung	Won	
2004	The Top 10 Songs	小城大事	Won	
2004	The Gold Song	小城大事 (Miriam Yeung)	Won	
2008	The Top 10 Songs	撈月亮的人	Won	
2008	Most Popular Female Artist	Miriam Yeung	Won	
2009	The Top 10 Songs	原來過得很快樂	Won	
2009	Most Popular Female Artist	Miriam Yeung	Won	
2010	The Top 10 Songs	斗零踭	Won	
2010	Most Popular Duet	First Sight (初見) (along with Raymond Lam)	Gold Award	
2010	Asia Most Popular Female Artist	Miriam Yeung	Won	

=== Metro Showbiz Hit Awards ===
The Metro Showbiz Hit Awards (新城勁爆頒獎禮) is held in Hong Kong annually by Metro Showbiz radio station. It focus mostly in cantopop music.

Year	Award	Work	Result	Ref.
1996	Hit New Female Artist	Miriam Yeung	Won	
1997	Most Leap Female Artist	Miriam Yeung	Won	
1998	Most Leap Female Artist	Miriam Yeung	Won	
1999	Hit Song	Lift Up My Head(抬起我的頭來)	Won	
2000	Hit Song	Teenage Girl's Prayer(少女的祈禱)	Won	
2000	Hit Karoke Song	Teenage Girl's Prayer(少女的祈禱)	Won	
2001	Hit Song	Wild Child(野孩子)	Won	
2001	Hit Popular Female Artist	Miriam Yeung	Won	
2002	Hit Song	Shining(閃靈)	Won	
2002	Hit Female Artist	Miriam Yeung	Won	
2003	Hit Song	Too Bad I'm An Aquarius (可惜我是水瓶座)	Won (#9)	
2003	Hit Karoke Song	Too Bad I'm An Aquarius (可惜我是水瓶座)	Won	
2003	Hit Female Artist	Miriam Yeung	Won	
2004	Hit Song	小城大事	Won	
2004	Hit Song of the Yeare	小城大事	Won	
2004	Hit Female Artist	Miriam Yeung	Won	
2005	Hit Song	烈女	Won	
2005	Hit Karoke Song	烈女	Won	
2005	Hit Female Artist	Miriam Yeung	Won	
2005	Global Hit Female Artist	Miriam Yeung	Won	
2006	Hit Song	Rolling (滾) (With Edmund Leung)	Won	
2007	Hit Song	Disappear (化)	Won	
2007	My Favorite Female Artist	Miriam Yeung	Won	
2007	Global Hit Female Artist	Miriam Yeung	Won	
2008	Hit Song	撈月亮的人	Won	
2008	My Favorite Female Artist	Miriam Yeung	Won	
2008	Asia Most Popular Female Artist	Miriam Yeung	Won	
2008	Global Hit Female Artist	Miriam Yeung	Won	
2009	Hit Song	Soulmate (真命天子)	Won	
2009	My Favorite Female Artist	Miriam Yeung	Won	
2009	Asia Most Popular Female Artist	Miriam Yeung	Won	
2009	Global Hit Female Artist	Miriam Yeung	Won	
2010	Hit Song	(斗零踭)	Won	
2010	My Most Appreciating Female Artist	Miriam Yeung	Won	
2010	Global Hit Female Artist	Miriam Yeung	Won	
2010	15 years of Service Award	Miriam Yeung	Won	

=== Metro Radio Mandarin Music Awards ===
Year	Award	Work	Result	Ref.
2003	Hit Mandarin Song	I Am Not Afraid of Anything (什麼都不怕)	Won	
2003	Hit Mandarin Leap Artist	Miriam Yeung	Won	

=== RTHK Top 10 Gold Songs Awards ===
The RTHK Top 10 Gold Songs Awards Ceremony(zh:十大中文金曲頒獎音樂會) is held annually in Hong Kong since 1978. The awards are determined by Radio and Television Hong Kong based on the work of all Asian artists (mostly cantopop) for the previous year. Miriam has average of 2 award per year since 1999 and a total of 23 awards since 1996.

Year	Award	Work	Result	Ref.
1996	Most Promising New Artist	Miriam Yeung	Won	
1997	Outstanding Artist	Miriam Yeung	Bronze Award	
1998	Most Leap Female Artist Award	Miriam Yeung	Silver Award	
1999	Top 10 Songs	Lift Up My Head (抬起我的頭來)	Won	
1999	Most Leap Female Artist Award	Miriam Yeung	Bronze Award	
2000	Top 10 Songs	Teenage Girl's Prayer(少女的祈禱)	Won	
2000	Most Leap Female Artist Award	Miriam Yeung	Silver Award	
2001	Top 10 Songs	Sister(姊妹)	Won	
2001	Top 10 Best Artist	Miriam Yeung	Won	
2002	Top 10 Songs	Smile Within Tears(笑中有淚)	Won	
2002	Top 10 Best Artist	Miriam Yeung	Won	
2003	Top 10 Songs	Too Bad I Am an Aquarius(可惜我是水瓶座)	Won	
2003	Top 10 Best Artist	Miriam Yeung	Won	
2004	Top 10 Songs	小城大事	Won	
2004	Top 10 Best Artist	Miriam Yeung	Won	
2005	Top 10 Songs	烈女	Won	
2005	Top 10 Best Artist	Miriam Yeung	Won	
2006	Top 10 Best Artist	Miriam Yeung	Won	
2007	Top 10 Songs	Disappearing (化)	Won	
2007	Top 10 Best Artist	Miriam Yeung	Won	
2008	Top 10 Songs	撈月亮的人	Won	
2008	Top 10 Best Artist	Miriam Yeung	Won	
2009	Top 10 Songs	原來過得很快樂	Won	
2009	Top 10 Best Artist	Miriam Yeung	Won	
2010	Top 10 Best Artist	Miriam Yeung	Won	

=== Sprite Music Awards ===
The Sprite Music Awards Ceremony is an annual event given by Sprite China for work artists performed in previous years; awards categorized as 2005 are actually for the work and accomplishment for 2004.

Year	Award	Work	Result	Ref.
2006	Top 10 Songs (Hong Kong + Taiwan)	烈女	Won	
2006	Asia Most Popular Female Artist	Miriam Yeung	Won	
2007	Top 10 Songs (Hong Kong + Taiwan)	人情世故	Won	
2007	Asia Most Popular Female Artist	Miriam Yeung	Won	
2007	Best Album	Meridian	Won	

== Hosting-related ==
Year	Award	Category	Nominated work	Result
2007	2007 TVB Anniversary Awards	Best Presenter	Minutes to Fame (Season 3)	Nominated
