= Aberdeen (2014 film) =

2014 Hong Kong film by Pang Ho-cheung

- Official poster
- Directed by: Pang Ho-cheung
- Written by: Pang Ho-cheung
- Starring: Louis Koo; Eric Tsang; Miriam Yeung; Gigi Leung; Ng Man-tat; Carrie Ng
- Cinematography: Jason Kwan
- Edited by: Wenders Li
- Music by: Peter Kam
- Production companies: Sun Entertainment Culture Limited; Making Film Productions; Huayi Brothers; Sil-Metropole Organisation
- Distributed by: Bravos Pictures
- Release dates: 24 March 2014 (HKIFF); 8 May 2014 (Hong Kong)
- Running time: 98 minutes
- Country: Hong Kong
- Language: Cantonese
- Box office: US$3.5 million

Aberdeen (Chinese: 香港仔), previously known as 曼珠莎華, is a 2014 Hong Kong drama film written and directed by Pang Ho-cheung and starring Louis Koo, Eric Tsang, Miriam Yeung and Gigi Leung. Pang revealed in various interviews that the film differed from his previous comedies Vulgaria and SDU, in that it explores the family dynamics in a typical Hong Kong family. The film is also known as 人间小团圆 in mainland China. The film was released on 8 May 2014.

== Cast ==
- Louis Koo as Cheng Wai-tao
- Eric Tsang as Cheng Yau-Kin cheung
- Miriam Yeung as Cheng Wai-ching
- Gigi Leung as Cici Cheng
- Ng Man-tat as Dong Cheng
- Carrie Ng as Ta
- Chapman To
- Shawn Yue as Dan
- Dada Chan as Van
- Jacky Choi
- Derek Tsang
- Yumiko Cheng
- Pal Sinn
- Lawrence Chou
- Derek Kwok
- Matt Chow
- Lee Man-kwai as Chloe "Piggy" Cheng
- Angelina Lo
- Chan Fai-Hung
- Brenda Lam
- Ryan Lau

== Reception ==
As of 11 May 2014, the film has grossed ¥9.6 million in China and HK$4.57 million in Hong Kong. It was listed among "Hong Kong's 5 Most Essential Films of 2014" in The Wall Street Journal's "China RealTime" blog.
