= Dead Air (2007 film) =

2007 Hong Kong film by Xavier Lee

- DVD cover
- Directed by: Xavier Lee
- Written by: Cary Cheng; Lau Ho-leung; Lemon Liu
- Produced by: Teddy Chen
- Starring: Derek Tsang; Raymond Wong Ho-yin; Terence Yin; Wayne Lai; Jo Kuk; Leila Tong Ling; Susan Tse
- Edited by: Yau Chi-Wai
- Music by: Patrick Lo
- Production company: Sum-Wood
- Release date: 4 November 2007 (Hong Kong)
- Running time: 87 minutes
- Country: Hong Kong
- Languages: Cantonese; Mandarin

Dead Air (Chinese: 鬼计; pinyin: "Gwai gai") is a 2008 Hong Kong horror film. It is Xavier Lee's directorial debut as well as Derek Tsang's first time in a lead role.

== Reception ==
According to John Li from MovieXclusive, the B grade film explores a range of intriguing themes, but ultimately becomes convoluted in its execution.

AsianMovieWeb too was critical of the film. Various Chinese sources commented on the presence of Leila Tong (aka Tang Nin) in the cast, for her first role in a ghost film.
