= 2004 Jade Solid Gold Awards =

Hong Kong music awards ceremony

The 2004 Jade Solid Gold Best Ten Music Awards Presentation (Chinese: 2004度十大勁歌金曲頒獎典禮) was held in January 2005. It is part of the Jade Solid Gold Best Ten Music Awards Presentation series held in Hong Kong.

== Top 10 song awards ==
The top 10 songs (十大勁歌金曲) of 2004 are as follows.

Song name in Chinese	Artist
按摩女郎	Andy Lau
愛與誠	Leo Ku
世上只有	Joey Yung
小城大事	Miriam Yeung
娛樂大家	Gigi Leung
嫁妝	Kelly Chen
空中飛人	Hacken Lee
女人味	Twins
美中不足	Andy Hui, Deanie Ip
艦隊	Edmond Leung

== Additional awards ==
Award	Song (if available for award)	Recipient
The most popular new artist (最受歡迎新人獎)	-	(gold) Fiona Sit
-	-	(silver) Yan Ng
-	-	(bronze) Endy Chow
The best phone voted song (最受歡迎Phone投歌大獎)	黃	Nicholas Tse
The most popular commercial song (最受歡迎廣告歌曲大獎)	心病	(gold) Joey Yung
-	常言道	(silver) Andy Lau
-	超時空接觸	(bronze) Twins, Boy'z, Isabella Leong
The most popular Chinese song (最受歡迎華語歌曲獎)	原來我有愛	(gold) Andy Lau
-	獨照	(silver) Joey Yung
-	Happy Girl	(bronze) YuFeiMen
The best group song (最受歡迎合唱歌曲獎)	好好戀愛	Alex Fong, Stephy Tang
Most popular self-composed singer (最受歡迎唱作歌星)	-	(gold) Gigi Leung
-	-	(silver) Hins Cheung
-	-	(bronze) Pong Nan
Outstanding performance award (傑出表現獎)	-	(gold) Edison Chen
-	-	(silver) Shawn Yue
-	-	(bronze) Jade Kwan
Rising star song (新星試打金曲獎)	思覺失調	Wilfred Lau
Most popular adapted song award (最受歡迎改編歌曲演繹大獎)	好睇	Emme Wong
The best compositions (最佳作曲)	小城大事	Mark Lui, performed by Miriam Yeung
The best lyrics (最佳填詞)	奇洛李維斯回信	Wyman Wong, performed by Fiona Sit
The best music arrangement (最佳編曲)	翡翠劇場	Keith Leung (梁基爵), performed by Anthony Wong
The best song producer (最佳歌曲監製)	愛與誠	Mark Lui, performed by Leo Ku
Community chest charity live-combination award (公益金 Live 大不同組合大獎)	兩忘骽水裡	Joey Yung, Anthony Wong
Four channel award (四台聯頒音樂大獎)	-	Miriam Yeung
Asian Pacific most popular Hong Kong male artist (亞太區最受歡迎香港男歌星獎)	-	Andy Lau
Asian Pacific most popular Hong Kong female artist (亞太區最受歡迎香港女歌星獎)	-	Kelly Chen
The most popular male artist (最受歡迎男歌星)	-	Andy Lau
The most popular female artist (最受歡迎女歌星)	-	Joey Yung
Gold song gold award (金曲金獎)	小城大事	Miriam Yeung
