= Pang Ho-cheung =

Hong Kong filmmaker

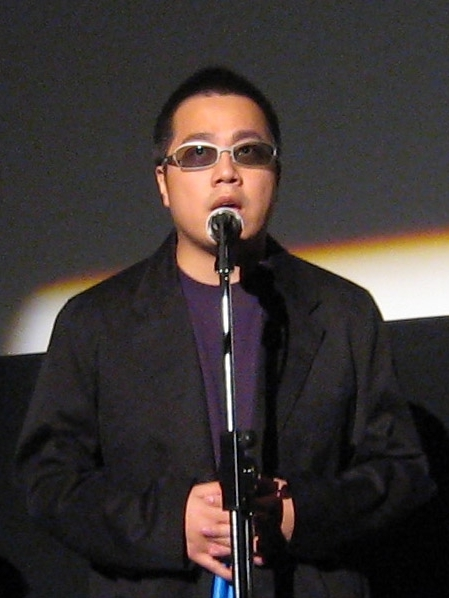
- Pang at the 2007 Toronto International Film Festival
- Born: 22 September 1973 (age 52); Hong Kong
- Occupations: Film director; producer; screenwriter; novelist
- Awards: Hong Kong Film Awards – Best New Director; 2004 Men Suddenly in Black; Best Screenplay; 2011 Love in a Puff Golden Bauhinia Awards – Best Screenplay; 2002 You Shoot, I Shoot; 2005 Beyond Our Ken Hong Kong Film Critics Society Awards – Best New Director; 2004 Men Suddenly in Black

Chinese name
Transcriptions
Standard Mandarin
- Hanyu Pinyin: Péng Hàoxiáng
Yue: Cantonese
- Jyutping: paang4 hou6 coeng4

Edmund Pang Ho-cheung (Chinese: 彭浩翔) is a Hong Kong film director, screenwriter, producer, and novelist.

== Early life ==
Pang was born in Hong Kong in 1973. At the age of 15, he started using a video camera to direct short films with his elder brother.

After graduating from high school, he studied abroad in Taiwan for half a year, before returning to Hong Kong, where he worked for Hong Kong Asian Television Limited as a gag show writer. He later wrote his first novel, and served as a columnist for various newspapers and magazines.

== Career ==
In 1997, at the age of 24, Pang began 18 months of research for his first novel, Fulltime Killer. The novel went on to become extremely popular, selling more than 100,000 copies in Hong Kong. It was then reworked as a radio programme. Johnnie To adapted the novel into a feature film starring Andy Lau in 2001.

While Pang was still a television and radio host, he decided to fulfil his dream of being a film director.

Pang made his feature length debut with You Shoot, I Shoot (2001).

His feature film Love in the Buff opened the 36th Hong Kong International Film Festival, in March 2012. The film is a sequel to the successful romance Love in a Puff. Both star Miriam Yeung and Shawn Yue Man-lok. The films have been likened to Hong Kong's version of the Before trilogy.

In February 2019, it was reported that Pang was going to write, direct, and produce a film trilogy based on Jin Yong's wuxia novel The Deer and the Cauldron through Pang's Making Films Production company. Each film was slated to receive an $80 million dollar budget.

== Style and themes ==
Pang has been deemed one of Hong Kong cinema's most recognisable directors. However, he is uncomfortable with being categorised as a "Hong Kong director" as he believes the attribution does not fully capture the full range of films within the industry.

Muse magazine film critic Perry Lam has praised Pang for "often demonstrat[ing] a Kafkaesque talent for seeing the absurd in the mundane realities of everyday life."

== Personal and political views ==
In 2019, actor and pro-democracy supporter Chapman To posted online that he would be cutting all ties with former collaborator Pang Ho-cheung, over the director's condemnation of anti-extradition bill protests in Hong Kong.

== Personal life ==
Pang is married to producer Subi Liang. In 2021, Pang was rumoured to have moved to Canada with his wife, over frustrations surrounding mainland Chinese censorship laws.

== Filmography ==
Year	Title	Director	Writer	Notes	Ref.
2000	Undercover Blues	No	Yes	zh: 刑杀之法	
2000	Killers	No	Yes	zh: 刀手	
2001	The Cheaters	No	Yes	zh: 正将	
2001	You Shoot, I Shoot	Yes	Yes	co-wrote with Vincent Kok	
2003	Men Suddenly in Black	Yes	Yes	co-wrote with Patrick Kong & Erica Lee	
2004	Beyond Our Ken	Yes	Yes	co-wrote with Wong Wing-Sze	
2005	A.V.	Yes	Yes	co-wrote with Wenders Li & Sam Chak-Foon	
2006	Isabella	Yes	Yes	co-wrote with Kearen Pang, Derek Tsang, & Jimmy Wan	
2007	Exodus	Yes	Yes	co-wrote with Cheuk Wan-chi & Jimmy Wan	
2007	Trivial Matters	Yes	Yes	zh: 破事儿	
2010	Love in a Puff	Yes	Yes	co-write with Heiward Mak	
2010	Dream Home	Yes	Yes	co-wrote with Derek Tsang, & Jimmy Wan Chi-man	
2012	Love in the Buff	Yes	Yes		
2012	Vulgaria	Yes	Yes	co-wrote with Lam Chiu-wing & Luk Yee-sum	
2014	Aberdeen	Yes	Yes		
2014	Women Who Flirt	Yes	Yes	co-wrote with Luk Yee-sum	
2017	Love Off the Cuff	Yes	Yes	co-wrote with Luk Yee-sum & Jimmy Wan Chi-man	
2019	Missbehavior	Yes	Yes	co-wrote with Sunny Lau	

=== Producer ===
- Mr. Right (short film) (2008)
- A Nail Clipper Romance (short film) (2010)
- 假戏真做 (short film) (2010)
- 谎言大作战 (short film) (2010)
- 爱在微博蔓延时 (short film) (2010)
- A Nail Clipper Romance (2017)

=== Novelist ===
- Fulltime Killer (2001)

=== Actor ===
- Mysterious Story I: Please Come Back (1999)
- The Faterangers (1999)
- You Shoot, I Shoot (2001)
- Leaving in Sorrow (2001)
- Men Suddenly in Black (2003)
