= Just One Look (film) =

2002 Hong Kong film by Yip Kam-hung

- Poster
- Directed by: Yip Kam-Hung
- Written by: Yip Kam-Hung
- Produced by: Cheung Shing Sheung
- Starring: Shawn Yue; Anthony Wong; Gillian Chung
- Edited by: Maurice Li Ming Wen
- Music by: Henry Lai Wan-man
- Distributed by: Emperor Entertainment Group (EMP)
- Release date: 19 September 2002
- Country: Hong Kong
- Language: Cantonese
- Box office: HK$ 4.133 M.

Just One Look (Chinese: 一碌蔗; pinyin: Yat luk che) is a 2002 Hong Kong film written and directed by Yip Kam-Hung, and starring Shawn Yue, Anthony Wong and Gillian Chung.

== Plot ==
A young man contemplates revenge on the gangster he believes responsible for his father's death. Though his policeman father had committed suicide in a movie theatre toilet ten years earlier, Fan still believes that the local kingpin called "Crazy" is somehow responsible for his death. Making a living by selling his family wares in front of a local theater, Fan and his best friend Ming decide to enlist in a kung fu class to impress the master's daughter Nam. Things later get complicated when Fan falls for a mysterious country girl.

== Cast ==
- Shawn Yue - Fan
- Gillian Chung - Decimator
- Charlene Choi - Nam
- Wong You-Nam - Ming
- Anthony Wong Chau-sang - Crazy
- Andrea Choi - Fan's Mother
- Vincent Kok - Villager #1
- Joe Cheung
- Lam Suet
- Chapman To
- Raymond Cho
- Shu Qi (cameo)
- Eric Kot
- Chung King-fai
- Li Fung
- Jo Kuk
- Sam Lee
