= Lacuna (film) =

- Film poster
- Directed by: Derek Tsang; Jimmy Wan
- Written by: Gu Yu; Zhang Youyou
- Produced by: Pang Ho-cheung; Feng Rui; Liu Zhijiang; Zhang Han
- Starring: Shawn Yue; Zhang Jingchu
- Cinematography: Charlie Lam
- Edited by: Wenders Li Tung-Chuen
- Production company: Beijing Film Studio
- Release date: June 1, 2012 (China)
- Running time: 92 minutes
- Country: China
- Language: Mandarin

Lacuna (Chinese: 醉后一夜, Zui hou yi ye, lit. "After a Drunken Night") is a 2012 Chinese romantic comedy film directed by Derek Tsang and Jimmy Wan.

== Plot ==
Shen Wei and Tong Xin wake up together in a furniture store bed after a drunken binge unaware of who the other person is and how they ended up together; they part. Wei, unable to find his Audi or his friend "White Hair", soon learns about Internet videos of him, Xin and Meng Qiqi, a famous actress, taken the night before. Xin is unable to account for three hundred thousand US dollars intended as a bribe from her boss, a film director, to Qiqi to both end the director's relationship with the actress and to keep her quiet.

When called by the police saying the missing pet Wei and his 'girlfriend' reported, he is told they must both come to claim it so he and Xin meet and start to piece together their night. A bag claim token in Wei's wallet leads them to obtain Qiqi's wallet at an upmarket bar where the staff greet them by name as they are now VIP, having spent $90 000. Travelling to an unusual police station they find that their pet ate apples from a store and they find it is an alpaca. The police serjeant says Xin claimed they had to take it to her boss or the $300 000 would be useless. Xin remembers then that Qiqi refused the money. When they take the beast to the director and say it is from Qiqi he ends up using it, Xin and Wei in the Nativity scene he is filming.

A text message to Wei sees them go to another club where they meet Pupi, the lead singer of the club's band who has texted them both throughout the day, and a man named Choize. Choize's two thugs drag them into his car where they interrogate them to find the location of Maria who left with them last night. Maria, Xin remembers, is the frog they had all been filmed licking the night before and who scared her when it jumped from her purse in the morning. Xin is held hostage while Wei goes to her apartment and recovers the frog.

In her apartment Xin remembers that they went to an apartment building construction site so the pair travel there again to look for the money. They find one apartment filled with artistically sculpted furniture: sorrowful over her recent breakup Wei cheered up Xin last night by decorating the apartment with furniture made from building supplies. They find ticket stubs from a drive in cinema, in the cinema they find Wei's car and in the boot they find Wei's missing friend White Hair and Qiqi, accidentally locked in. Qiqi believes the money has all been spent but when White Hair gives them another baggage claim token the pair rush to collect the item and they find Xin's bag with $180 000 in it. The pair exchange phone numbers (though they had been texting earlier in the film) and the film ends with a brief montage of the previous night revealing that the pair wandered into the furniture store while stumbling around an alley and finding an unlocked door.

== Cast ==
- Shawn Yue as Shen Wei
- Zhang Jingchu as Tong Xin
