= Love Off the Cuff =

2017 Hong Kong-Chinese film by Pang Ho-cheung

- Theatrical release poster
- 春嬌救志明
- Directed by: Pang Ho-cheung
- Screenplay by: Luk Yee-sum; Pang Ho-cheung; Wan Chi-man
- Produced by: Subi Liang; Pang Ho-cheung
- Starring: Miriam Yeung; Shawn Yue
- Cinematography: Chou Yi-hsien
- Edited by: Wenders Li
- Music by: Alan Wong; Janet Yung; Peter Kam
- Production companies: Making Film Productions; Media Asia Films
- Distributed by: Media Asia Distribution (Hong Kong); Youth Enlight Pictures (China)
- Release dates: April 11, 2017 (HKIFF); April 27, 2017 (Hong Kong); April 28, 2017 (China)
- Running time: 120 minutes; 117 minutes (Mainland China)
- Countries: Hong Kong; China
- Languages: Cantonese; Mandarin
- Budget: US$12 million
- Box office: US$25.2 million

Love Off the Cuff (Chinese: 春嬌救志明) is a 2017 romantic comedy film directed by Pang Ho-cheung and starring Miriam Yeung and Shawn Yue. A Hong Kong-Chinese co-production shot in Hong Kong and Taipei, the film is the sequel to the 2012 film Love in the Buff and the third installment in the Love in a Puff film series.

The film had its world premiere at the 41st Hong Kong International Film Festival on April 11, 2017, and was released in Hong Kong on April 27, 2017 and in mainland China on April 28, 2017.

== Plot ==
In the third installment of "Love in a Puff" series, Jimmy and Cherie find their relationship has become somewhat mundane and stale after seven years together. Various events occur which put their relationship to the test, including one time being too tired to make love, a misunderstanding resulting from Cherie's pet dog copulating with a stranger's dog, the sudden appearance of Jimmy's attractive, and younger childhood friend Flora, a happenstance discussion about marrying to have kids, and Flora wanting Jimmy's sperm for artificial insemination. When an earthquake occurs while they are vacationing in Taiwan, it triggers a sequence of events that lead to Cherie deciding to break it off with Jimmy. During their time apart, they both reflect on what each wants out of their relationship. Jimmy realizes what he wants and comes to understand what Cherie wants, and then proposes to her.

== Cast ==
- Miriam Yeung as Cherie Yu
- Shawn Yue as Jimmy Cheung
- Paul Chun as Cherie's father
- Jiang Mengjie as Flora
- Wang Xiaochen as Apple
- Siu Yam-yam as Cherie's mother
- Derek Tsang as Cherie's younger brother
- Roy Szeto as Li
- Vincent Kok as Tat
- Jo Kuk
- Isabel Chan as Isabel
- Mia Yam as Mandy Fung
- June Lam as Brenda
- Toby Lee as Photographer
- Stephanie Au
- Jan Lamb as Manager
- Sammy Leung as Hairstylist
- Dada Chan
- Hugo Ng
- Rainy Kuo
- Tarah Chan
- Matt Chow
- Lawrence Chou
- Koyi Mak
- Subyub Lee
- Edith Au
- Bonnie Wong

== Soundtrack ==
Love Off the Cuff OST

Soundtrack album by Various artists
- Released: April 27, 2017
- Genre: Film soundtrack
- Label: Media Asia Music

No.	Title	Performer	Length
1.	"It's Undeniable"	Kyle Castellani	03:20
2.	"I'm Not Gonna Forget You 動地驚天愛戀過"	Cherie Yu (Miriam Yeung)	02:49
3.	"Legend 傳說"	MKB48 (Miriam Yeung, Isabel Chan and June Lam)	03:19
4.	"Thinking of You (VO by Brenda) 當余春嬌想起張志明 (Brenda 聲演)"	Brenda (June Lam)	02:00
5.	"When I Think Of You (feat. Jimmy Cheung) 當我想起你 (feat. 張志明)"	Cherie Yu and Jimmy Cheung (Miriam Yeung and Shawn Yue)	04:29
6.	"Yue Chun Giu 余春嬌"	Cherie Yu (Miriam Yeung)	02:53
7.	"Yatterman 小雙俠"	The CA Children's Choir	02:06

=== Featured songs ===
No.	Title	Writer(s)	Performer	Length
1.	"Peter & Mary (Mandarin version) 志明與春嬌 (國語版)"	Wyman Wong, Ashin	Mayday
2.	"Peter & Mary (Cantonese version) 志明與春嬌 (廣東話版)"	Roy Tsui, Ashin	Shawn Yue

== Release ==
Love Off the Cuff was released in Hong Kong on 27 April 2017. It was the highest grossing local film in Hong Kong in 2017, grossing $3.87 million (HK$30.26 million). Love Off the Cuff grossed a total of CN¥174.8 million in mainland China.

== Awards and nominations ==
Award	Category	Recipients	Result
37th Hong Kong Film Awards	Best Supporting Actor	Paul Chun	Nominated
37th Hong Kong Film Awards	Best New Performer	Stephanie Au	Nominated
37th Hong Kong Film Awards	Best Screenplay	Pang Ho-cheung, Jimmy Wan, Luk Yee-sum	Nominated
23rd Huading Awards	Best Actress	Miriam Yeung	Nominated
23rd Huading Awards	Best Supporting Actress	Jiang Mengjie	Nominated
23rd Huading Awards	Best Screenplay	Pang Ho-cheung	Won
25th Beijing College Student Film Festival	Best Actress	Miriam Yeung	Nominated
