= Men Suddenly in Black =

2003 Hong Kong film by Pang Ho-cheung

- Movie poster
- Directed by: Pang Ho-Cheung
- Written by: Patrick Kong; Erica Lee; Pang Ho-Cheung
- Produced by: Eric Tsang
- Starring: Eric Tsang; Chapman To; Jordan Chan; Spirit Blue; Teresa Mo; Candy Lo; Marsha Yuen
- Cinematography: Kenny Lam Ping-Wah
- Edited by: Wenders Li Tung-Chuen
- Music by: Anthony Chue Chan-Tung; Peter Kam Pau-Tat
- Production companies: United Filmmakers Organisation; Anytime Pictures Co. Ltd
- Release date: 11 September 2003
- Running time: 99 minutes
- Country: Hong Kong
- Language: Cantonese

Men Suddenly in Black (Chinese: 大丈夫) is a 2003 Hong Kong sex comedy parody of Hong Kong triad films directed by Pang Ho-Cheung. The sequel Men Suddenly in Black II was released in 2006.

== Plot ==
As their wives and girlfriends embark on a trip to Thailand, four men spend the next 14 hours trying to engage in romantic affairs before their return.

== Cast and roles ==
- Eric Tsang – Kwok Tin-yau, leader of the group
- Chapman To – Chao
- Jordan Chan – Cheung, the doctor
- Spirit Blue – Paul, the new kid from Beijing
- Teresa Mo – Tin's Wife
- Candy Lo – Anna
- Marsha Yuen – Ching
- Natalis Chan – Yeung, previous member who got caught
- Cheung Tat-ming – Bellboy
- Chim Sui-man – Cybercafé owner
- Maria Cordero – JoJo, Tin's old sweetheart
- Lam Suet – Police chief
- Tony Leung Ka-Fai – Ninth Uncle, previous leader who got caught
- Sandra Ng – Ninth Uncle's wife
- Jenny Raven – Young JoJo
- Derek Tsang – Young Tin
- Courtney Wu – Womanizer

=== Cameos ===
- Ellen Chan (cameo)
- Belinda Hamnett (cameo)
- Sammo Hung – himself (cameo)
- Eric Kot (cameo)
- Iris Wong (cameo)
- Chin Kar-lok – himself (cameo)
- Teresa Mak (cameo)
- Alan Tam (cameo)

== Awards ==
- 23rd Annual Hong Kong Film Awards (2004):
  - Winner – Best Supporting Actor (Tony Leung Ka-Fai)
  - Winner – Best New Director (Pang Ho-Cheung)
- 40th Annual Golden Horse Awards
  - Nomination – Best Director (Pang Ho-Cheung)
  - Nomination – Best Supporting Actor (Chapman To Man-Chat)
  - Nomination – Best Original Screenplay (Pang Ho-Cheung, Erica Lee Man, Patrick Kong)
- 10th Annual Hong Kong Film Critics Society Awards
  - Recommended Film
