= The Brink (2017 film) =

2017 Hong Kong film by Jonathan Li

- Theatrical release poster
- Traditional Chinese: 狂獸
- Simplified Chinese: 狂兽
- Literal meaning: The Ferocious Beast
- Hanyu Pinyin: Kuáng shòu
- Jyutping: kwong4 sau3
- Directed by: Jonathan Li
- Written by: Lee Chun-fai
- Produced by: Cheang Pou-soi; Paco Wong
- Starring: Zhang Jin; Shawn Yue; Janice Man; Wu Yue; Gordon Lam
- Cinematography: Kenny Tse
- Edited by: Pang Ching-hei
- Music by: Chung Chi-wing; Ben Cheung
- Production companies: Sun Entertainment Culture iQiyi; YL Pictures; Sil-Metropole Organisation
- Distributed by: Bravos Pictures
- Release dates: 13 October 2017 (Busan); 23 November 2017 (Hong Kong)
- Running time: 100 minutes
- Country: Hong Kong
- Language: Cantonese
- Budget: HK$100 million (est. US$15.5 million)
- Box office: US$10.1 million

The Brink is a 2017 Hong Kong action crime-thriller film directed by Jonathan Li and written by Lee Chun-fai. The film stars Zhang Jin, Shawn Yue, Janice Man and Wu Yue, with Gordon Lam making a special appearance. It was released in theaters on 23 November 2017.

== Plot ==
Sai Gau is a reckless police officer who is dead set on tracking down Shing, a smuggler of black market gold disguising under the guise of commercial fishing business. When he learns that Shing is going after a triad boss's underwater gold vault, Sai Gau takes to the high seas to hunt for his prey.

Shing, an orphan adopted by the mob boss of the gold smuggling operation, Guo is entrusted by his adoptive father to look over his inexperienced and brash son and heir Shawn Yuen when his health is deteriorated. However, Shawn Yuen dislikes being told what to do by Shing and plans to kill Shing so he can succeed his father wholly.

== Cast ==
- Zhang Jin as Sai Gau
- Shawn Yue as Shing
- Janice Man as Suet
- Wu Yue as Tak
- Tai Po as Shui Sing
- Cecilia So as Adopted daughter of Sai Gau
- Yasuaki Kurata as Blackie

=== Special appearance ===
- Gordon Lam as Chan

=== Guest appearance ===
- Derek Tsang as Shui Sing's son

== Soundtrack ==
No.	Title	Writer(s)	Performer	Length
1.	"The Brink 狂獸"	Chow Yiu-fai, Walter Wong	Andy Hui	4:00

== Awards and nominations ==
Awards	Category	Nominee	Results	Ref.
37th Hong Kong Film Awards	Best New Director	Jonathan Li	Nominated	
37th Hong Kong Film Awards	Best Action Choreography	Li Chung-chi	Nominated	
