= Drink-Drank-Drunk =

2005 Hong Kong film by Derek Yee

- Film poster
- Directed by: Derek Yee
- Written by: Derek Yee; Jessica Fong
- Produced by: Mandy Law; Li Shuihe; Samson Ng
- Starring: Miriam Yeung; Daniel Wu; Alex Fong; Vincent Kok; Hu Jing; Ella Koon
- Cinematography: Horace Wong
- Edited by: Eric Kwong
- Music by: Peter Kam
- Production companies: Film Unlimited; Shanxi Film Studio
- Distributed by: Film Unlimited; Shanxi Film Studio
- Release date: 18 August 2005
- Running time: 110 minutes
- Country: Hong Kong
- Language: Cantonese

Drink-Drank-Drunk
- Chinese: 千杯不醉
Transcriptions
Standard Mandarin
- Hanyu Pinyin: Qiānbēi Búzuì
Yue: Cantonese
- Jyutping: cin1 bui1 bat1 zeoi3

Drink-Drank-Drunk (Chinese: 千杯不醉; Cantonese Yale: Chīnbūi Bātjeui) is a 2005 Hong Kong film directed by Derek Yee.

== Plot ==
A romantic comedy, the film is about Siu Min, a Budweiser girl who takes pity on Michael, an ethnic Chinese restaurateur from France drinking away his misfortune because his food is too sophisticated for (and thus unpopular with) the working-class neighborhood in which both work. Unsatisfied with spending her days as a beer girl, the ambitious Siu Min becomes Michael's partner in the restaurant business, and eventually falls in love with him. Michael, however, must reconcile his dream of traveling the world with his other dream of running a successful restaurant.

== Cast ==
- Miriam Yeung - Siu Min
- Daniel Wu - Michael
- Alex Fong Chung-Sun - Brother Nine
- Henry Fong
- Paul Fonoroff
- Hayama Go
- Asuka Higuchi
- Tony Ho
- Hu Jing - Kit
- Vincent Kok - Bo Bo (gay hot pot boss)
- Ella Koon - Yan Loh
- Toby Leung
- Chin Kar-lok - Big Bear
- Terence Yin - Wanderer (Michael's friend)
