= You Shoot, I Shoot =

2001 Hong Kong film by Pang Ho-cheung

- Film poster
- Traditional Chinese: 買兇拍人
- Simplified Chinese: 买凶拍人
- Hanyu Pinyin: Mǎi Xiōng Pāi Rén
- Jyutping: Maai2 Hung1 Paak3 Jan4
- Directed by: Pang Ho-cheung
- Written by: Vincent Kok; Pang Ho-cheung
- Produced by: Vincent Kok; Pang Ho-cheung
- Starring: Eric Kot; Cheung Tat-ming
- Cinematography: O Sing-pui
- Edited by: Wenders Li
- Music by: Peter Kam
- Production companies: Golden Harvest Entertainment; Linksun International
- Distributed by: Golden Harvest
- Release date: 16 August 2001
- Running time: 94 minutes
- Country: Hong Kong
- Languages: Cantonese; Japanese; French
- Box office: HK$1,778,868

You Shoot, I Shoot (Chinese: 買兇拍人) is a 2001 Hong Kong black comedy film produced, written and directed by Pang Ho-cheung and starring Eric Kot and Cheung Tat-ming.

== Plot ==
Bart (Eric Kot), a professional contract killer, is requested by his clients to film his killings. He hires aspiring film director Lee Tung-chuen (Cheung Tat-ming) for the filming.

== Cast and roles ==
- Eric Kot as Bart
- Cheung Tat-ming as Lee Tung-chuen
- Chan Fai-hung as Hung
- Michael Chan as Bill
- Jim Chim as Double Gun Tai Hung / Kwok Wai-bun
- Audrey Fang as Ling, Bart's wife
- Miu Fei-lam as Mrs. Ma
- Asuka Higuchi as Michiko
- Vincent Kok as Camera / X-rated VCD shop owner
- Ken Wong as Ray
- Nancy Lan as Mrs. Nina Nam
- Lam Suet as Fatty
- Tats Lau as James
- Spencer Lam - Mr. Tse
- Hyper BB as Mahjong girl at restaurant
- Frankie Ng as Brother B
- Angela Tong as Mrs. Tong
- Matt Chow as Porno director
- Henry Fong as Foul-mouthed Wah
- Yu Ming-hin as Bart's first victim
- Chan Yun-ping as Boutique staff
- Pang Sau-wai as Girl massaging porno director
- Eric Chan as Jackie
- Poon An-ying as Tea lady on porno set
- Anthony Ng as Bill's thug at restaurant
- Tin Kai-man as Junkie Derek
- Wong Man-chung as Traffic policeman
- Joe Cheng as Mrs. Ma's mahjong friend
- Henry Yu as Mr. Tai
- Siu Yam-yam as Mrs. Tai
- Billy Chung as Bart's MTV victim
- Andy Tsang as Bart's MTV victim
- Wilson Yip as Bart's MTV victim
- Lam Chiu-wing as Bart's MTV victim
- James Tse as Bart's MTV victim
- Wenders Li as Bart's MTV victim
- Roy Szeto as Bart's MTV victim
- Peter Kam as Bart's MTV victim
- Wu Ka-lok as Bart's MTV victim
- Kenneth Bi as Bart's MTV victim
- Clarence Cheung as Bart's MTV victim
- Ho Chi-moon as Mr. Cheung
- Lee To-yue as Brother Chun
- Berg Ng as Curry Samosa
- Chiu Wan-kit as Brother B's thug
- Ricky Fan as Brother B's thug
- Christy Cheung as Wing
- So Wai-nam as Horny muscle man at Bill's office
- Chow Siu-lun as Doggie
- Siu Hung as Restaurant worker
- Terence Tsui as Bill's bare body thug
- Luk Kwong-choi as Old man
- Roderick Lam as Policeman
- Lee Shiu-cheung as Policeman
- Chan Kin-yung as Policeman
- Wai Ping-chung as Policeman
- Pang Ho-cheung as Director
- Tam Kon-chung as Brother B's thug
- Pierre Tremblay as voice of Alain Delon (uncredited)

== Release ==
The film had special screening in the NYAFF 25th Anniversary Rediscoveries section of the 25th New York Asian Film Festival on 16 July 2026 as part of the 25th anniversary of the festival.

== Accolades ==
Accolades
Ceremony	Category	Recipient	Outcome
21st Hong Kong Film Awards	Best Screenplay	Vincent Kok, Pang Ho-cheung	Nominated
