= 2000 Jade Solid Gold Awards =

Hong Kong music awards ceremony

The 2000 Jade Solid Gold Best Ten Music Awards Presentation (Chinese: 2000年度十大勁歌金曲頒獎典禮) was held on 14 January 2001. It is part of the Jade Solid Gold Best Ten Music Awards Presentation series held in Hong Kong.

== Top 10 song awards ==
The top 10 songs (十大勁歌金曲) of 2000 are as follows.

Song name in Chinese	Artist
少女的祈禱	Miriam Yeung
一生一火花	Jacky Cheung
活著VIVA	Nicholas Tse
K歌之王	Eason Chan
花花宇宙	Kelly Chen
著迷	Aaron Kwok
感情線上	Sammi Cheng
給自己的情書	Faye Wong
當我遇上你	Andy Lau
一千次日落	Andy Hui

== Additional awards ==
Award	Song (if available for award)	Recipient
The most popular male artist (最受歡迎男歌星獎)	–	Aaron Kwok
The most popular female artist (最受歡迎女歌星獎)	–	Kelly Chen
Asian Pacific most popular Hong Kong male artist (亞太區最受歡迎香港男歌星獎)	–	Andy Lau
Asian Pacific most popular Hong Kong female artist (亞太區最受歡迎香港女歌星獎)	–	Faye Wong
Gold song gold award (金曲金獎)	少女的祈禱	Miriam Yeung
Annual outstanding award (2000年度傑出表現獎)	–	(gold) Joey Yung
–	–	(silver) Leehom Wang
–	–	(bronze) Gigi Leung
The best group songs (最受歡迎合唱歌曲獎)	會過去的	(gold) Andy Hui, Stephanie Che
–	漩渦	(silver) Anthony Wong, Cass Phang
–	將生活留給自己	(bronze) Andy Hui, William So, Mark Lui, Flora Chan, Rain Lee
The most popular new artist (male) (最受歡迎新人獎)	–	(dual gold) Edison Chen, Louis Koo
–	–	(bronze) Nick Cheung
The most popular new artist (female) (最受歡迎新人獎)	–	(gold) Flora Chan
–	–	(silver) Elle Choi (小雪)
–	–	(bronze) Rain Lee
Most popular adapted song award (最受歡迎改編歌曲演繹大獎)	祝君好	Julian Cheung
The most popular commercial song (最受歡迎廣告歌曲大獎)	一生一火花	(gold) Jacky Cheung
–	美麗在望	(silver) Joey Yung
–	代你發夢	(bronze) Candy Lo
Rising star song (新星試打金曲獎)	甜蜜世界	Fei fei ding (丁菲飛)
Most popular online song (最受歡迎網上金曲獎)	K歌之王	Eason Chan
Most popular mandarin song (最受歡迎國語歌曲獎)	我不夠愛你	(gold) Andy Lau, Kelly Chen
–	花樣年華	(silver) Tony Leung, Niki Wu (吳恩琪)
–	不要害怕	(bronze) Leehom Wang
Community chest charity award (公益金慈善金曲大獎)	只怕不再遇上	Andy Lau, Kelly Chen
The best compositions (最佳作曲)	活著VIVA	Nicholas Tse
The best lyrics (最佳填詞)	給自己的情書	Albert Leung
The best music arrangement (最佳編曲)	給自己的情書	C.Y. Kong
The best song producer (最佳歌曲監製)	K歌之王	Chan Fai-young
Four channel award (四台聯頒傳媒大獎)	Untitled	Alvin Leong, performed by Leslie Cheung
Honours award (十大勁歌金曲致敬大獎)	–	Leslie Cheung
