= The Child's Eye =

2010 Hong Kong film by the Pang brothers

- Hong Kong poster
- Directed by: Danny Pang; Oxide Pang
- Written by: Danny Pang; Oxide Pang; Thomas Pang
- Produced by: Alvin Lam; Danny Pang; Oxide Pang
- Starring: Rainie Yang; Elanne Kwong; Lam Ka-tung; Jo Koo; Ciwi Lam; Izz Xu; Rex Ho; Shawn Yue
- Cinematography: Decha Srimantra
- Edited by: Curran Pang
- Music by: Origin Kampanee
- Production company: Golden Harvest
- Distributed by: Universe Films Distribution Co. Ltd.
- Release dates: 4 September 2010 (Venice); 14 October 2010 (Hong Kong)
- Running time: 97 minutes
- Country: Hong Kong
- Languages: Cantonese; Mandarin
- Budget: $4.5 million

The Child's Eye (Chinese: 童眼) is a 2010 Hong Kong horror film by the Pang brothers. It takes place in 2008 in Bangkok where six friends find themselves at the Chung Tai Hotel. After Rainie (Rainie Yang) sees a female ghost and Ling (Elanne Kwong) finds a disembodied hand, they find that while at dinner, the three men they came with have disappeared. Rainie leads the girls to find their friends.

The Child's Eye premiered on 4 September 2010 at the Venice Film Festival, making it the first 3D Hong Kong horror film. The film received negative reviews, most of which took issue with the quality of the script.

== Plot ==
In Bangkok, six young people on vacation find themselves stranded at an airport due to a riot. A driver takes them to the Chung Tai Hotel, run by Chuen, where Rainie sees a female ghost and Ling finds a hovering hand trying to grab her. While at dinner the three men disappear. Rainie leads the girls with the aid of Man-man and her ghost-seeing dog Little Huang as they try to find them in the hotel's underground passages where they encounter the female ghost and a strange monster which is actually a dog human hybrid.

== Cast ==
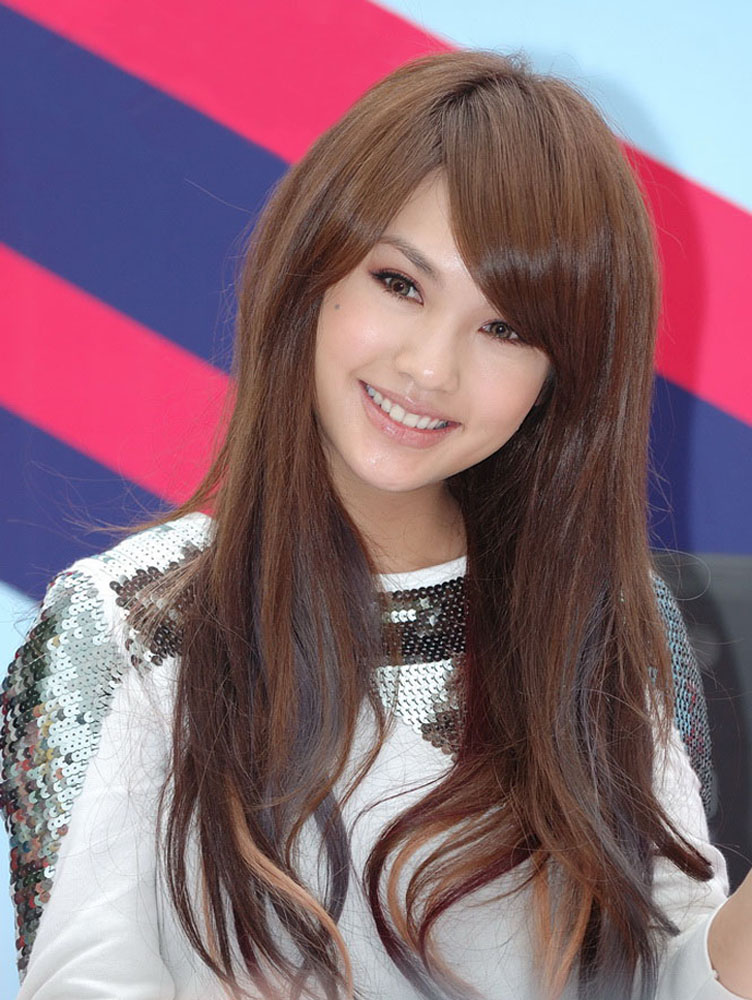
Actress Rainie Yang in 2010. Yang played a character named Rainie in The Child's Eye

- Rainie Yang as Rainie. The romantic partner of Lok. They are on the verge of breaking up.
- Elanne Kwong as Ling. The sister of Rex.
- Lam Ka-tung as Chuen. The owner of the hotel.
- Jo Koo as Chuen's wife.
- Ciwi Lam as Ciwi. The girlfriend of Hei.
- Izz Xu as Hei. Ciwi's boyfriend.
- Rex Ho as Rex. Ling's brother.
- Shawn Yue as Lok. Rainie's romantic partner.

== Production ==
Due to the success of Journey to the Center of the Earth and Bolt, the idea of producing The Child's Eye as a 3-D film was greenlit. The Child's Eye is the first 3D Hong Kong horror film and the first Hong Kong production to be entirely shot in 3-D and in high definition. Director Danny Pang stated that when he "went to see the 3-D Hollywood films the first chance we got...The technology of 3-D filming is now well-developed enough for us to try applying our horror style."

The film began shooting in June 2009 in Thailand. The Pang brothers stated they had difficulty with the camera movement, editing, and filming on location in 3D, saying "It took 10 hours to get 12 shots. It took more time to adjust the lighting for the 3-D effects. And we needed to adjust the balance level of the left eye and the right eye—getting the correct focus is important and quite difficult". Actress Rainie Yang said the role in the film was difficult for her, stating "I never tried this before in my previous works. It is demanding as it all depends on your own imagination. But I feel lucky that I could try such special role which others may want to try but could never have a chance".

== Release ==
The film premiered out of competition at the Venice Film Festival on September 4, 2010. It was released in Hong Kong on October 14, 2010. Clips to promote the film were shown at Ocean Park in Hong Kong before its release. The film premiered at number one position on its first week in the Hong Kong box office grossing $572,080. The film was also successful in Malaysia where it was the number one film in the box office for two weeks, grossing a total of $1,487,116. The film grossed a total of $3,712,643 worldwide.

=== Reception ===
The film received generally negative reviews after its premiere. Variety commented on a weak script, and notes that the "hands pop out of the ground, monsters lunge camerawards, and other shocktastic devices that even William Castle would have thought corny are deployed...Outside Asia, this one looks destined to be eyeballed mostly by cultists". Film Business Asia gave the film a three out of ten rating, stating that "The Child's Eye 3D is not as lame as the previous entry in the Pang Brothers' Eye cycle, The Eye 10...The fault, as with so many of the brothers' films, lies in the script, which generates little characterisation among its six young leads (actually three, for most of the film) and relies purely on eerie sound effects, sudden crashes on the soundtrack and ghost/monster shots for its horror". Screen Daily gave the film a mixed review, stating that the script is a "strictly by-the-numbers affair, there are more than a few nicely set-up 3D moments and a healthy moment of surreal filmmaking in amidst the film's horror-in-a-hotel tale". Today gave the film a rating of 1.5 out of 5, saying that "poor acting, the lack of cast cohesiveness and too many plot holes makes this wannabe fright flick one huge disappointment".
