= Curse of the Deserted =

- Film poster
- Traditional Chinese: 荒村公寓
- Simplified Chinese: 荒村公寓
- Hanyu Pinyin: Huāngcūn Gōngyù
- Directed by: Law Chi-leung
- Written by: Cheung Chi-Kwong; Cai Jun
- Based on: Curse of the Deserted by Cai Jun
- Produced by: Wen Jun
- Starring: Shawn Yue; Zhang Yuqi; Fu Miao; Yue Xiaojun
- Cinematography: Chan Chi-Ying
- Edited by: Eric Kwong Chi-Leung
- Music by: Tommy Wai
- Production company: Jinding Shengshi Culture Limited Company
- Release date: 13 August 2010 (China)
- Running time: 96 minutes
- Country: China
- Language: Mandarin

Curse of the Deserted is a 2010 Chinese horror film directed by Law Chi-leung and written by Cheung Chi-Kwong and Cai Jun, and starring Shawn Yue, Zhang Yuqi, Fu Miao, and Yue Xiaojun. The film is an adaptation of Cai Jun's novel of the same name.

== Cast ==
- Shawn Yue as Guo Jing, a Chinese novelist, Xiaozhi's boyfriend.
- Zhang Yuqi as Ouyang Xiaozhi/ Huang Xiaozhi, Guo Jing's girlfriend.
- Fu Miao as A teacher, Sun Zichu's girlfriend.
- Yue Xiaojun as Sun Zichu, a scientist.

=== Other ===
- Liu Shuhan as Han Xiaofeng.
- Qin Zihan as Chun Yu.
- Dai Xu as Su Tianping.
- Li Zefeng as Huo Qiang.
- Hai Yitian as Ye Xiao.
- Shi Liuyi as Yan Zhi.
- Wu Xiaoliang
- Zhu Nuolin

== Production ==
This film was shot in Tianjin, including Taida Library, Sadajie, and Binhai New Area.

== Release ==
The film premiered in Beijing on 12 August 2010 and was released in China on 13 August 2010.
