= Hooked on You (film) =

2007 Hong Kong film by Law Wing-cheong

- Teaser poster
- Directed by: Law Wing-Cheong
- Written by: Fung Chi Chiang
- Produced by: Johnnie To
- Starring: Miriam Yeung; Eason Chan
- Cinematography: Pui O-Sing
- Edited by: Law Wing-Cheong
- Music by: Dennie Wong
- Production companies: Media Asia Films; Beijing Silver Dream; China Film Media Asia; Milkyway Image
- Distributed by: Media Asia Distribution Ltd.
- Release date: 29 June 2007 (Hong Kong)
- Running time: 97 minutes
- Country: Hong Kong
- Languages: Cantonese; English

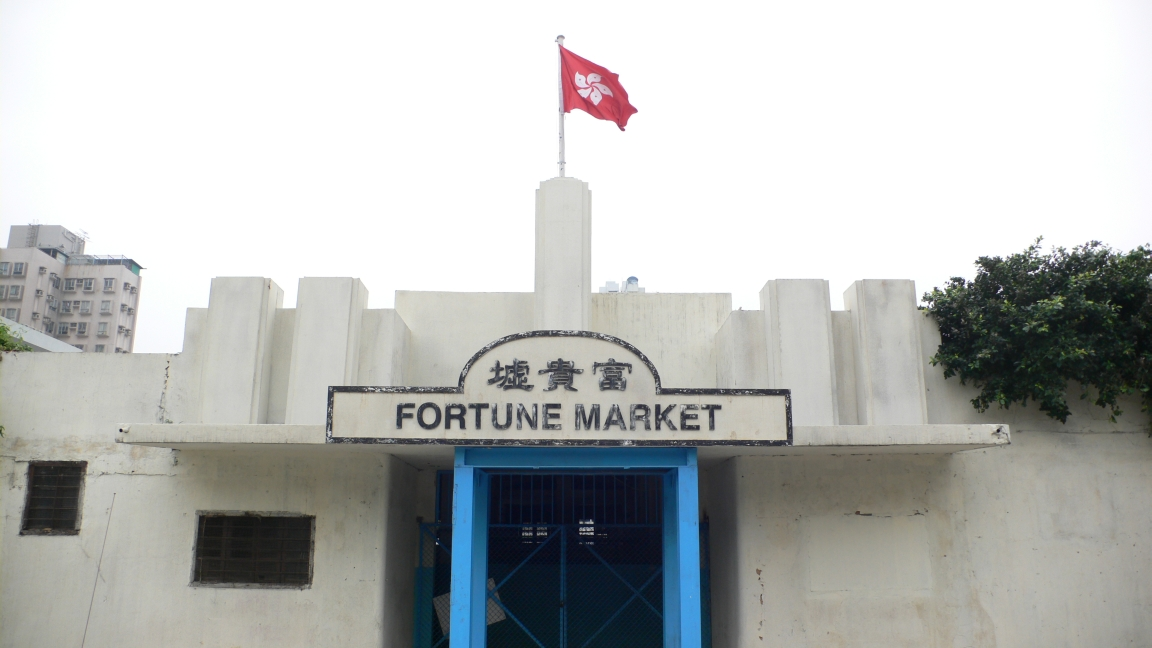
Luen Wo Market was temporarily turned into "Fortune Market" for the purpose of the film

Hooked on You (traditional Chinese: 每當變幻時; simplified Chinese: 每当变幻时; Cantonese Yale: Múih dōng bin waahn sìh) is a 2007 Hong Kong comedy-drama film directed and edited by Law Wing-Cheong and produced by Johnnie To and his production company Milkyway Image. Featuring an ensemble cast, the film stars Miriam Yeung as a fishmonger who strives to fulfill her lifelong dreams before she turns 30.

== Plot ==
Miu, a fishmonger at the Prosperity Market. Because of her father's debt she gives herself three years to work at the Wet market. She promises herself that she's going to leave the wet market and find a man worthy of her. At the market she always quarrels with her neighbor stall Mr. Fish (Eason Chan), but when a new supermarket threatens their business at the Prosperity Market they work together to fight against it.

== Cast ==
- Miriam Yeung - Miu
- Eason Chan - Fishman
- Huang Bo - Porky
- Fung Shui-Fan - Miu's father
- Stephanie Cheng
- Wong You-Nam - Joe
- Jo Kuk - Salesgirl at accessory shop
- Charmaine Fong
- Lam Ka-Tung - Beautician
- Hui Shiu-Hung - Bro Hung
- Raymond Wong - Man at bowling parlour
- Carl Ng - Miu's date
- Wayne Lai - Porky (voice)

== See also ==
- Johnnie To filmography
