= Sharon Luk =

Hong Kong actress

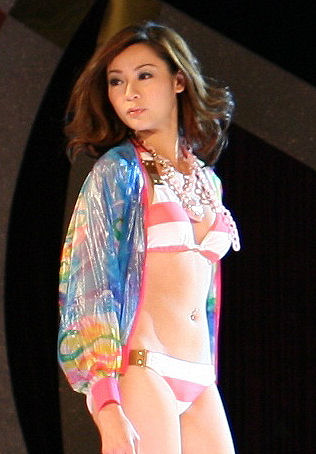
- Luk in 2007
- Born: 29 December 1980 (age 45); British Hong Kong
- Occupation: Actress
- Years active: 2005–present

Chinese name
- Traditional Chinese: 陸詩韻
- Simplified Chinese: 陆诗韵
Transcriptions
Standard Mandarin
- Hanyu Pinyin: lu4 shi1 yun4
Yue: Cantonese
- Jyutping: luk6 si1 wan6

Sharon Luk or Luk Sze-wan (born 29 December 1980) is a TVB actress. She is also Miss Hong Kong 2005 1st runner up.

== Background ==
Growing up in a family of 2, Sharon was born in Hong Kong. Ever since she was young, Sharon wanted to be a pilot, but instead became a flight attendant with Korean Air and then Virgin Group. She entered the Miss Hong Kong 2005 pageant.

== Miss Hong Kong 2005 ==
After getting interviewed by TVB staff members, she made the top 40. She was in the acting group for Eric Tsang. Tsang chose her to be in the top 20 of the pageant. After 3 months of training and filming in Thailand and Sri Lanka, she competed on 20 August for the crown. At first she wasn't a favorite for the crown. However she had an excellent performance during the final night. Her top 10 interview was also interesting. Eventually she made the top 5 and won 2nd runner up.

== Afterwards ==
After she won the 1st runner up, she signed a contract with TVB. She hosted E-Buzz and many charity shows. Many thought she would compete in the Miss World 2005 pageant. However, due to her being overage, Tracy Ip, Miss Hong Kong 2005, was sent instead to the pageant.

== Filmography ==
=== Television series ===
- Best Selling Secrets (TVB 2007-2008) as Carrie
- Survivor's Law II (TVB 2008) as a Hong Kong International School Vice Principal
- Forensic Heroes II (TVB 2008) as Cherry Miu
- A Journey Called Life (TVB 2008)
- When a Dog Loves a Cat (TVB 2008) as Nam Yue Sze, Vet
- When Easterly Showers Fall on the Sunny West (TVB 2008) as Chiu Hiu-Mei

=== Film ===
- Overheard (2009) as Mary
- Love in a Puff (2010)
- Lives in Flame (2012)
- Sara (2015)
- Fooling Around Jiang Hu (2016)
- Our Days in 6E (2017)
