= YuFeiMen =

Chinese musical group

- Also known as: YFM, Nand
- Origin: Guangzhou, China
- Genres: Indietronica
- Years active: 2001–
- Labels: Universal Music Group
- Members: Jiang Fan; Atsing; San Shao

YuFeiMen (与非门), also known as YFM or Nand, is a Guangzhou-based Chinese indietronica band founded in 2001. The Chinese name literally means NAND gate and phonetically sounds like the English phrase "You feel me?"

The band consists of three members, Jiang Fan (蒋凡), the female vocalist, Atsing (阿庆; A Qing), the programmer and guitarist, and San Shao (三少), the songwriter and DJ. Having worked with international producers such as Howie B on its albums, the band had toured France, Japan, Hong Kong, Singapore and Malaysia. Quentin Tarantino once praised them as having "a sense of EBTG".

== Discography ==
=== Studio albums ===
- 2001: 01
- 2003: 10 Happy Paradise (10乐园)
- 2005: 11
- 2009: Shi Yu Fei (是与非; "Yes and No")

=== Compilation albums ===
- 2005: A Luoji (A逻辑; "A Logic")
- 2022: YuFeiMen: 20 Years (与非门·廿年)

=== EP ===
- 2001: Zuo Ai Zuo de Shi (做爱做的事; "Do the Enjoyable Things")
