= Vulgaria =

2012 Hong Kong film by Pang Ho-cheung

- Film poster
- Directed by: Pang Ho-cheung
- Screenplay by: Pang Ho-cheung; Lam Chiu-wing; Luk Yee-sum
- Produced by: Pang Ho-cheung; Subi Liang
- Starring: Chapman To; Ronald Cheng; Dada Chan; Fiona Sit
- Cinematography: Jason Kwan
- Edited by: Wenders Li
- Music by: Alan Wong; Janet Yung
- Production company: Making Film Productions
- Distributed by: Golden Scene Co. Ltd
- Release date: 9 August 2012 (Hong Kong)
- Running time: 92 minutes
- Country: Hong Kong
- Language: Cantonese
- Budget: HK$8,000,000
- Box office: HK$30,069,986

Vulgaria (Chinese: 低俗喜劇) is a 2012 Hong Kong comedy film directed by Pang Ho-cheung.

The film won Best Supporting Actor and Best Supporting Actress at the 32nd Hong Kong Film Award.

== Plot ==
Struggling movie producer To Wai-cheung is hardly able to make alimony payments to his ex-wife, and yet his daughter Jacqueline hopes to one day see him being interviewed by TVB so she can show her schoolmates her father is a real movie producer. In order to fulfill his daughter's dream, through his best buddy Lui he meets Tyrannosaurus, a Guangxi based triad head and a movie investor with a peculiar taste. Tyrannosaurus takes the duo out to a dinner full of weird dishes. He wants a remake of his favorite film, the 1976 Shaw Brothers sex scorcher Confession of a Concubine, to be renamed as Confessions of Two Concubines, but only if Siu Yam-yam reprises her original starring role. As Siu Yam-yam is unwilling to act naked at her present age, To has to hire Popping Candy, with whom he has oral sex, as Siu's body double. Worse still, To and Liu, who refuse to eat the dishes before them, are told by Tyrannosaurus that the deal can be sealed only if they have sex with a mule.

== Cast ==
- Chapman To as To Wai-cheung, a movie producer
- Ronald Cheng as Brother Tyrannosaurus
- Dada Chan as Tsui Ka Yan, a model known as "Popping Candy"
- Fiona Sit as Quin Lau, To's assistant
- Matt Chow as Blackie Tat, a movie director
- Lawrence Cheng as university professor Cheng
- Simon Lui as Lui Wing-shing, To's best friend
- Lam Suet as Wa Tau, Tyrannosaurs' henchman
- Siu Yam-yam as herself
- Hiro Hayama as himself
- Nora Miao as Miss Cheung
- Vincent Kuk as CEO of Playboy
- Kristal Tin as Tsang Lai-fun, To's ex-wife
- Miriam Yeung as investigator Leung
- Jim Chim as Firearm Lau
- Mak Ling-ling as hypnotist
- Huang Lu as university student

== Release ==
The film received HK$30 million at the box office.

== Critical reception ==
Deborah Young of The Hollywood Reporter said, "Fully living up to its title, Vulgaria is Hong Kong comedy at its breeziest and most communicative."

Richard Kuipers of Variety said, "Freewheeling pic, helmed by the prolific Pang Ho-cheung scores more hits than misses and, deep down, has a warm heart that bobs up nicely in the closing stages."

Beijing film critic Jia Xuanning won the Hong Kong Arts Development Council's inaugural Critic's Prize with a critique essay of Vulgaria. Entitled "Gazing at the Anxiety of Hong Kong Film Through Vulgaria", the essay critiqued the film's low brow humor and negative portrayal of mainlanders. Pang responded by arguing that the "Hong Kong spirit is embodied in freedom of speech".

The film was nominated for six Golden Horse Awards.
