= Derek Tsang =

Hong Kong filmmaker and actor

- 曾國祥
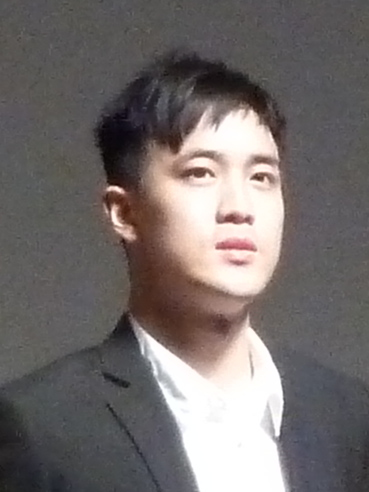
- Tsang at the 2010 Hong Kong International Film Festival
- Born: 8 November 1979 (age 46); British Hong Kong
- Education: University of Toronto (BA)
- Occupations: Filmmaker; actor
- Spouse: Venus Wong (m. 2019)
- Parents: Eric Tsang (father); Rebecca Chu (mother)
- Family: Bowie Tsang (half-sister); Tsang Wing Yee (half-sister); Mark Tsang (brother)

Chinese name
- Traditional Chinese: 曾國祥
- Simplified Chinese: 曾国祥
Transcriptions
Standard Mandarin
- Hanyu Pinyin: Zēng Guóxiáng
Yue: Cantonese
- Jyutping: Zang1 Gwok3coeng4

Derek Tsang Kwok-cheung (曾國祥; born 8 November 1979) is a Hong Kong filmmaker and actor. The son of actor Eric Tsang, Tsang got his start in the Hong Kong film industry working for director Peter Chan after graduating from the Scarborough campus of the University of Toronto in 2001. He made his acting debut in Men Suddenly in Black (2003) and directorial debut with Lover's Discourse (2010), sharing the directing credit with Jimmy Wan Chi-man. The duo was nominated for Best New Director at the 47th Golden Horse Awards.

His solo directorial debut Soul Mate (2016) was critically praised, receiving 12 nominations at the 36th Hong Kong Film Awards and 7 nominations at the 53rd Golden Horse Awards. His next film, Better Days (2019), was nominated for Best International Feature Film at the 93rd Academy Awards, becoming Hong Kong’s first Oscar submission directed by a Hong Kong native to be nominated in the category.

== Early life ==
Derek Tsang was born to actor Eric Tsang and his second wife Rebecca Chu in Hong Kong on 8 November 1979.

Tsang described his upbringing as mostly detached from his father's public limelight. He said his father had moved out to live on his own when Tsang was a child because he had wanted to keep his personal life separate from the entertainment industry, which allowed Tsang "an ordinary, middle-class upbringing". Tsang lived with his mother, grandmother, and younger brother Mark in Mei Foo Sun Chuen before the family, excluding his father, moved to Canada when Tsang was 11.

Tsang received his bachelor of arts in sociology at the Scarborough campus at the University of Toronto in 2001.

== Career ==
After graduation, Tsang moved back to Hong Kong, where his father arranged for him to work under director Peter Chan Ho-Sun. There, he met producer Jojo Hui and director Jimmy Wan Chi-man, both of whom would go on to be Tsang's frequent collaborators.

Despite not pursuing an acting career, Tsang has had a variety of acting roles since the start of his career, which he attributed to other actors not wanting to be typecast into roles with unflattering characteristics. He made his screen debut in Men Suddenly in Black (2003), cameoing as the younger version of his father's character. There he met director Pang Ho-cheung, whom Tsang would later collaborate with on various projects.

Tsang's solo directorial debut, Soul Mate (2016), earned him Best Director nominations at various film award ceremonies, including the 36th Hong Kong Film Awards, the 53rd Golden Horse Awards and the 11th Asian Film Awards.

His next film, Better Days (2019), won eight out of twelve categories at the 39th Hong Kong Film Awards, including Best Film and Best Director. The film was subsequently chosen as Hong Kong's official entry for Best International Feature Film at the 93rd Academy Awards. The film was nominated, but ultimately lost to Denmark's Another Round. Tsang became the first native Hong Kong director in the category.

In July 2021, Tsang was invited to become a member of the Academy of Motion Picture Arts and Sciences.

== Filmmaking ==
Tsang said his influences are primarily derived from art-house cinema, with early influences from director Wong Kar-wai and the French New Wave, as opposed to his father Eric Tsang's works, which consisted of mostly of mainstream comedies. He credits his half sister Bowie Tsang for teaching him about film and literature.

== Personal life ==
Tsang married actress Venus Wong in 2019. He has expressed a reluctance to cast Wong due to the negative perception of nepotism.

== Filmography ==
=== Directing ===
- Lover's Discourse (2010)
- Lacuna (2012)
- Soul Mate (2016)
- Better Days (2019)
- 3 Body Problem (2024), episodes 1–2
- As Written (2025), short film

=== Producing ===
- She's Got No Name (2024)

=== Acting ===
- Stoma (2020)
- The Strangled Truth (2019)
- Missbehavior (2019)
- The Brink (2017)
- Love Off the Cuff (2017)
- S Storm (2016)
- Robbery (2016)
- From Vegas to Macau III (2016)
- From Vegas to Macau II (2015)
- Zombie Fight Club (2014)
- Z Storm (2014)
- Naked Ambition 2 (2014)
- Golden Chicken 3 (2014)
- Streets of Macao (2014)
- SDU: Sex Duties Unit (2013)
- My Sassy Hubby (2012)
- Triad (2012)
- Love in the Buff (2012)
- The Thieves (2012)
- Girl$ (2010)
- Once a Gangster (2010)
- Dream Home (2010)
- Ex (2010) – Sol
- Claustrophobia (2008) – John
- Ocean Flame (2008)
- Scare 2 Die (2008)
- Run Papa Run (2008) – Chicken
- Tactical Unit: No Way Out (2008)
- Simply Actors (2007) – Window cleaner vendor
- Single Blog (2007) – Woody
- Dragon Boys (2007) – Fox Boy (Canadian TV Miniseries)
- My Name Is Fame (2006)
- On the Edge (2006) – Mini B
- Midnight Running (2006) – Peter
- The Third Eye (2006) – Gum
- Without Words (2006) – Michael
- Isabella (2006) – Fai
- Cocktail (2006) – Kuen
- A.V. (2005) – Band-Aid
- It Had to Be You! (2005)
- The Eye 2 (2004) – Joey's co-worker
- The Park (2003) (as Derek Tsang) – Dan
- Men Suddenly in Black (2003) – Young Tin

== Awards and nominations ==
Award	Year	Nominated work	Category	Result	Ref.
Academy Awards	2021	Better Days	Best International Feature Film (representing Hong Kong)	Nominated	
Asian Film Awards	2017	Soul Mate	Best Director	Nominated	
AACTA Awards	2020	Better Days	Best Asian Film	Won	
China Film Director's Guild Awards	2017	Soul Mate	Best Hong Kong / Taiwan Director	Won	
China Film Director's Guild Awards	2020	Better Days	Best Hong Kong / Taiwan Director	Won	
Golden Horse Awards	2010	Lover's Discourse	Best New Director (shared with Jimmy Wan)	Nominated	
Golden Horse Awards	2016	Soul Mate	Best Director	Nominated	
Golden Rooster Awards	2017	Soul Mate	Best Directorial Debut	Nominated	
Golden Rooster Awards	2020	Better Days	Best Director	Nominated	
Hong Kong Film Awards	2017	Soul Mate	Best Director	Nominated	
Hong Kong Film Awards	2017	Soul Mate	Best New Director	Nominated	
Hong Kong Film Awards	2020	Better Days	Best Director	Won	
Hong Kong Film Critics Society Award	2017	Soul Mate	Best Director	Nominated	
Hong Kong Film Critics Society Award	2020	Better Days	Best Director	Won	
Hong Kong Film Directors' Guild	2017	Soul Mate	Best Director	Won	
Hong Kong Film Directors' Guild	2020	Better Days	Best Director	Won	
Osaka Asian Film Festival	2011	Lover's Discourse	Grand Prix (shared with Jimmy Wan)	Won	
Osaka Asian Film Festival	2017	Soul Mate	ABC Award	Won	
Osaka Asian Film Festival	2020	Better Days	Audience Award	Won	
Primetime Emmy Awards	2024	3 Body Problem	Outstanding Drama Series	Nominated	
