= All About Love (2010 film) =

2010 Hong Kong film by Ann Hui

- Theatrical release poster
- Directed by: Ann Hui
- Screenplay by: Yang Yeeshan
- Produced by: Ann Hui; Angela Wong; Wong Jing
- Starring: Sandra Ng; Vivian Chow
- Cinematography: Charlie Lam
- Edited by: Chan Chi-wai; Eric Kong Chi-leung
- Music by: Anthony Chue
- Production company: Class Limited
- Distributed by: Mega-Vision Pictures
- Release dates: 11 August 2010 (Hong Kong Summer International Film Festival); 26 August 2010 (Hong Kong)
- Running time: 105 minutes
- Country: Hong Kong
- Language: Cantonese

All About Love (得閒炒飯 De xian chao fan) is a 2010 Hong Kong film directed and produced by Ann Hui. Based on a true story, the plot concerns two bisexual women who had been lovers in the past and meet again years later in a counseling session for expectant mothers. Hui said in an interview that initially "There were no investors" for the film because the subject of same-sex relationships was banned in China, and the Hong Kong film industry relied on the Chinese market.

Ms. Hui, a graduate of the London Film School, described the film as "serious...but it is also very commercial," adding that "Sometimes it is better to make serious issues more acceptable to audiences, by making it a comedy and having big stars so that people will come watch the movie."

== Cast ==
- Sandra Ng as Macy
- Vivian Chow as Anita
- Cheung Siu-fai as Robert
- William Chan as Mike
- Joey Meng as Eleanor
- Queenie Chu
- Fan Yik-Man
- Fung Bo Bo
- Raven Hanson
- Serina Ha
- Jo Kuk as Waiwai
- Abe Kwong
- Eman Lam
- Rick Lau
- Tina Lau
- Jayson Li

== Release ==
All About Love had its world premiere at the Hong Kong Summer International Film Festival on 11 August 2010; followed by theatrical release on 26 August 2010.

Its international premiere was held at the 2010 Toronto International Film Festival on 13 September 2010. It was screened by the Denver Film Society at the 2011 Cinema Q Film Festival, and by the San Francisco Film Society in the inauguration of its "Hong Kong Cinema Series" festival in 2011.

== Accolades ==
List of accolades
Award / Film Festival	Date	Category	Recipient / Nominee	Result	Ref(s)
Asian Film Festival Reggio Emilia	2011	Best Actress	Sandra Ng	Won	
