= Jo Kuk =

Hong Kong actress and singer

Jo Koo
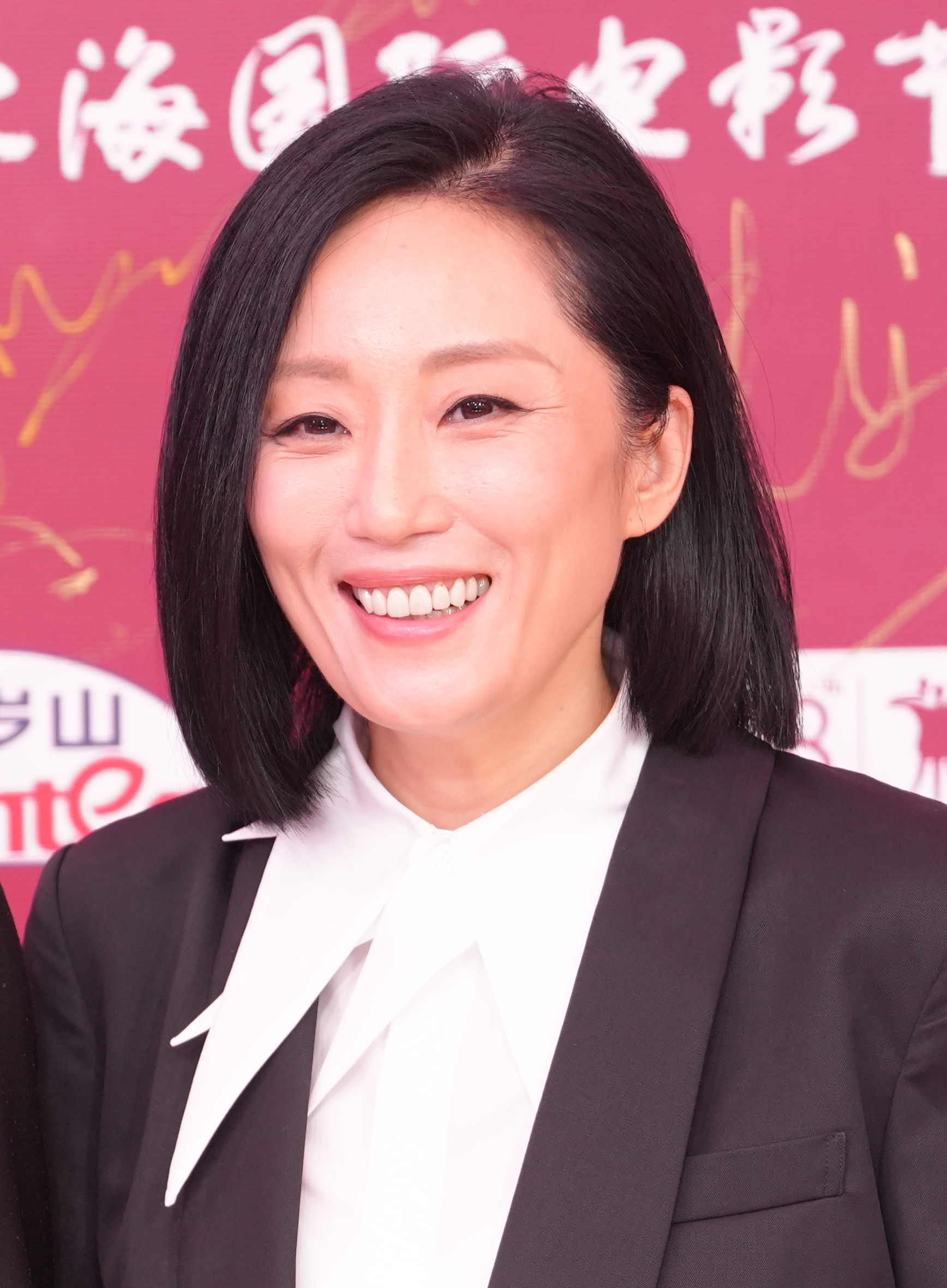
- Koo in 2026
- Born: 16 May 1977 (age 49); British Hong Kong
- Occupations: Actress; singer
- Years active: 1996–present
- Spouse: Andrew Lau (m. 2013)
- Children: 2

Jo Koo Cho-lam (谷祖琳; born 16 May 1977), sometimes credited as Jo Koo is a Hong Kong actress and singer. She won a Hong Kong Film Award and a Hong Kong Film Directors' Guild Award for her performance in Papa (2024).

== Personal life ==
In 2010, Koo married businessman Andrew Lau Wing-hang (劉穎恆), whom she met while studying in Australia. The couple have one daughter, born in 2012, and announced in July 2014 that Kuk was pregnant again. Outside of her acting career, Kuk also runs a chain of dessert shops.

== Filmography ==
Year	Title	Role	Notes
1996	First Option		
1998	The Longest Summer	Jane	Nominated – Hong Kong Film Award for Best New Performer
1999	Gorgeous	Pretty girl at seaside	
1999	Tempting Heart	Jo	
1999	Metade Fumaca	Dee Dee	
2000	Taste of China	Chinese girl	
2000	Little Cheung	Hang's girlfriend	
2000	Jiang hu: The Triad Zone	Tiger's girlfriend	
2001	Hit Team	Jane Chan	
2001	Born Wild	Sandy	
2001	Visible Secret	girl in subway	
2001	La Brassiere	Alex	
2002	Visible Secret 2	Mak Ching	
2002	Public Toilet	Jo	
2002	Just One Look	Crazy's girlfriend	
2003	Naked Ambition	Titty Bird	
2004	Super Model	pretty girl in Pageant	
2004	Unplugging Nightmare	Chelsea	a.k.a. Night Move a.k.a. Unplugged Nightmare
2004	Paradise Girls	Shirley	
2006	2 Become 1	Winnie	
2006	The Heavenly Kings	Kei Kei	a.k.a. The Heavenly Kings: A Popumentary
2006	Don't Open Your Eyes	Fiona	
2006	My Name Is Fame	Jo	
2007	Dead Air		
2007	Once in a Lifetime		
2007	Single Blog	Vivian	
2007	Simply Actors	working girl	
2007	Hooked on You	salesgirl at accessory shop	
2007	The Detective	Yin	
2007	Beauty and the 7 Beasts	Wendy	
2007	Mad Detective	Ho's Inner Personality	
2008	The Vampire Who Admires Me	Madam Sarah Chui	a.k.a. My Secret Admirer is a Vampire a.k.a. King Zombie
2008	High Noon	Addie's mother	a.k.a. Winds of September – The Hong Kong Chapter
2008	Lady Cop & Papa Crook	Joey	
2009	Vengeance	Crow's wife	
2009	I Come with the Rain	9mm Lover	
2009	Written By	Meng Por	
2009	Poker King	Joan	
2010	Womb Ghosts	Tracy	
2010	Love in a Puff (film)	KK	
2010	All About Love	Wai Wai	a.k.a. Leisurely Fried Rice
2010	The Child's Eye	Chuen's wife	
2011	All's Well, Ends Well 2011		
2011	The Detective 2		
2012	Love in the Buff	KK	
2013	Princess and the Seven Kung Fu Masters	Kurosawa Kiyoko	
2014	Hello Babies	Yip Sin-man	
2015	Full Strike	police officer	
2017	Love Off the Cuff		
2018	Distinction		
2019	Missbehavior		
2024	Love Lies	Diana	
2024	Papa	Kam Yin	

=== TV series ===
Year	Title	Network	Role	Notes
2005	Central Affairs	ATV	Ching Lok-yi (Rachel)	
2010	The Men of Justice	ATV	Suen Ming-wa (Joyce)	

=== Television shows ===
Year	Title	Network	Role
2022	Show me your fridge	ViuTV	Host
