= Girl$ =

2010 Hong Kong film by Kenneth Bi

- Directed by: Kenneth Bi
- Written by: Carol Cheong; Link Ling; Frankie Tam; Maria Wong
- Produced by: Ng Kin-Hung
- Starring: Michelle Wai; Bonnie Xian; Wong Si Man; Una Lin
- Cinematography: Sam Koa
- Edited by: Kenneth Bi
- Music by: Ghost Style
- Distributed by: Mei Ah Entertainment
- Release dates: 5 April 2010 (Hong Kong International Film Festival); 2 September 2010 (Hong Kong)
- Running time: 105 minutes
- Country: Hong Kong
- Language: Cantonese

Girl$ (Chinese: 囡囡) is a 2010 Hong Kong film directed by Kenneth Bi. It deals with teenagers and young women drawn into compensated dating in Hong Kong. The Chinese term 囡囡 (Jyutping: naam^{4} naam^{4}) is a traditional affectionate term for daughter or young girl, but has also become used as euphemism for a prostitute in Hong Kong.

== Plot ==
Gucci (Wong Si Man) is a teenager who seeks to enhance her own self-image through the acquisition of luxury goods, bidding online for a designer handbag that she cannot afford. Looking for a way to make quick money she comes into contact with Icy (Michelle Wai). Just 19 herself, Icy acts as an online procuress, down to a single regular working girl, the hypersexual Lin (Una Lin), she offers to act as an agent for the underage Gucci's virginity, she also convinces Ronnie (Bonnie Xian) to go on compensated dates. Ronnie comes from a wealthy background however she finds herself alone and afraid of forming emotional attachments, wanting to avoid the stigma of being a prostitute, she instead pays the men she goes on dates with. Despite the differences in background the four become friends.

Lin works as a prostitute for a guy who already has a girlfriend, and fell in love with him over time. She told him she liked him, tried to connect with him to social media, to no avail. He stopped seeing her while she stalks him, seeing him with his girlfriend on a date make her jealous. In rage, she splashed water to his girlfriend face while they were in a cafe, and he blocked her completely from social media.

Unaware that the police are searching for a serial killer who has been targeting girls, Icy goes on a compensated date herself when she finds herself in need of some extra money and none of her girls are available. However she is filmed in the process of having sex and is blackmailed, although the girls manage to recover the incriminating material, Icy's boyfriend discovers that she has broken her promise to him not to go on compensated dates and breaks-up with her. Meanwhile, Lin, desperate and lonely, goes for a date herself without Icy as the procuress. She picks up a random guy off the street, but it ended up badly. The customer tried to rape her anally, but she ran and hid in the bathroom. This leaves her scared and even more desperate.

At the same time, the other girls find another problem. A customer declares online that he is HIV positive and publishes the mobile phone numbers of girls he has been with, Icy, Lin and Ronnie find their numbers on the list. All four girls have blood tests despite Gucci still being a virgin (one attempt at selling her virginity ends when it is her own brother she finds waiting at a pre-arranged spot), the blood tests prove negative.

The film ends with Ronnie deciding to take the money offered to her for sex, and Gucci meeting with a customer, a customer who turns out to be even younger than herself.
