= Shawn Yue =

Hong Kong singer and actor

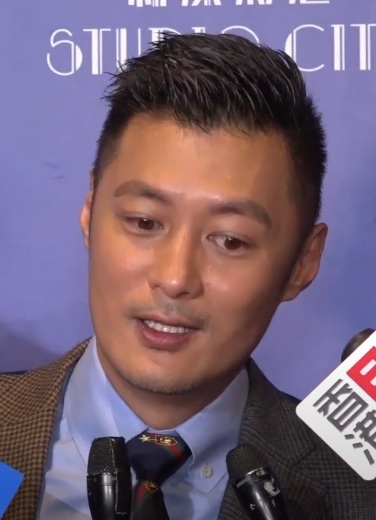
- Yue in January 2019
- Born: British Hong Kong
- Other names: Yue Man-lok; Fisherman Lok; Yue Wen-le
- Occupations: Actor; singer
- Years active: 2000–present
- Spouse: Sarah Wang (m. 2017)
- Children: 2
- Musical career
- Genre: Cantopop
- Instrument: Vocals
- Labels: Universal Music (Hong Kong) (2002–2006); Entertainment Impact (2006–2009); Dorian International Entertainment (2006–2009); East Asia Music (Holdings) (2009–present)

Chinese name
- Traditional Chinese: 余文樂
- Simplified Chinese: 余文乐
- Hanyu Pinyin: Yú Wénlè
- Jyutping: Jyu4 Man4-lok6

Shawn Yue Man-lok is a Hong Kongese actor and singer. And a former model, he has starred in many films, such as Jiang Hu, Infernal Affairs II, the Love in the Buff film series, Mad World and The Brink, and has established himself as a recognizable face in Hong Kong cinema.

== Early life ==
Yue was born and raised in Hong Kong. He was spotted at a young age on the streets of Hong Kong by agents of the modelling agency Starz People and began his modelling career on a part-time basis. Upon graduating from Grade 16, he proceed to full-time modeling. He has since modeled for brands such as Giordano, Sony, Timberland, Gillette, Meko and was a spokesperson for Shiseido Pureness and Coca-Cola China.

== Career ==
Yue starred in several movies and gained fame from his first role in Leaving Sorrowly (2001). Later, in 2005, Yue portrayed Takeshi Nakazato in the film Initial D.

Yue has also released four albums, the first being in 2002. He worked with Japanese music superstar Ayumi Hamasaki in 2007, starring as her love interest in the promotional videos for "glitter" and "fated", which together comprise the Wong Hoi-directed short film Kyoai ~Distance Love~.

== Filmography ==
=== Film ===
Year	English title	Original title	Role	Notes
2001	Leaving in Sorrow	憂憂愁愁的走了	Hong	
2002	Just One Look	一碌蔗	Fan	
2002	The New Option	飛虎雄師	Jackie Law	
2002	Infernal Affairs	無間道	Chan Wing-yan	
2003	Love Under the Sun	愛在陽光下		Short film
2003	1:99 Shorts	1:99 電影行動		
2003	My Lucky Star	行運超人	Policeman	
2003	Diva Ah-Hey	下一站...天后	Wing	
2003	Feel 100% 2003	百分百感覺 2003	Jerry Lau Yiu-jo	
2003	Infernal Affairs II	無間道II	Chan Wing-yan	
2003	Hidden Track	尋找周杰倫	Yu Wenle	
2003	Infernal Affairs III	無間道III: 終極無間	Chan Wing-yan	
2004	In-Laws, Out-Laws	我的大舊父母	Kang Qizu	
2004	Jiang Hu	江湖	Wing	
2004	Love Is a Many Stupid Thing	精裝追女仔2004	Crazy Tom	
2004	Super Model	我要做Model	interviewee praising Mandom	
2004	Deng Xiaoping in 1928	鄧小平·1928		
2005	Colour of the Loyalty	黑白戰場	Fat	
2005	Initial D	頭文字D	Takeshi Nakazato	
2005	Dragon Squad	猛龍	Officer Hung Kei-lok	
2006	McDull, the Alumni	春田花花同學會	Policeman	
2006	Isabella	伊莎貝拉	Man at bar	
2006	Dragon Tiger Gate	龍虎門	Turbo Shek	
2006	Diary	妄想	Ray Fan / Seth Lau	
2006	Wo Hu	臥虎	Killer	
2007	Love in the City	男才女貌	Yang Le	
2007	Undercover	危險人物	Feng	
2007	Invisible Target	男兒本色	Inspector Carson Fong	
2007	In Love with the Dead	塚愛	Tuan Yan-ming	
2007	Trivial Matters	破事兒	Lok	Segment "Junior"
2008	Playboy Cops	花花型警	Michael Mak Ho-man	
2008	Shamo	軍雞	Ryo Narushima	
2008	The Moss	青苔	Jan	
2008	Rule No. 1	第一誡	Sgt. Lee Kwok-keung	
2009	I Come with the Rain	伴雨行	Meng Zi	
2009	Rebellion	同門	Po	
2010	Hot Summer Days	全城熱戀熱辣辣	Tattoo Artist	
2010	Love in a Puff (film)	志明與春嬌	Jimmy	
2010	Curse of the Deserted	荒村公寓	Gene Guo	
2010	Legend of the Fist: The Return of Chen Zhen	精武風雲－陳真	General Zeng	
2010	Reign of Assassins	劍雨	Lei Bin	
2010	The Child's Eye	童眼	Lok	
2010	My Best Bodyguard	玩命狙擊	Sean	Thai film
2011	Tangled	—N/a	Eugene "Flynn Rider" Fitzherbert	Cantonese version, voice
2012	Heroic Detective	神探·李奧		
2012	The Second Woman	情谜	Nan	
2012	Love in the Buff	春嬌與志明	Jimmy	
2012	Motorway	車手	Cheung	
2012	Lacuna	醉后一夜	Shen Wei	
2012	The Guillotines	血滴子	Haidu	
2013	SDU: Sex Duties Unit	飛虎出征	Josh	
2014	As the Light Goes Out	救火英雄	Yau Bong-chiu	
2014	Golden Chicken 3	金雞SSS	Nerd with body odor	
2014	Aberdeen	香港仔	Dan	Cameo
2014	Girls	閨蜜	Qiao Li	
2015	From Vegas to Macau II	賭城風雲II	Vincent	
2015	Helios	赤盜	Fan Ka-ming	
2015	Wild City	暴走迷城	Chung	
2016	From Vegas to Macau III	賭城風雲III	Vincent	
2016	Mad World	一念無明	Tung	
2016	Mobile Phone Battle	手機芯戰		Short film
2017	Wu Kong	悟空传	Yang Jian (Erlang Shen)	
2017	Love Off the Cuff	春嬌救志明	Jimmy Cheung	
2017	The Brink	狂獸	Shing	
2020	Monster Run	怪物先生		

=== Television series ===
Year	English title	Original title	Role	Network	Notes
2000	Youth@Y2K	青春@Y2K	Chan Wing-lok	RTHK	
2001	Y2K+01	Y2K+01	Yue Man-lok	RTHK	
2002	Tomorrow	愛情白皮書	Ouyang Guaju	CTV	
2003	Original Scent of Summer	原味的夏天	Shi Jie	CTV	
2004	Sunshine Heartbeat	赤沙印記@四葉草.2	A student	TVB	
2006	Phoenix from the Ashes	浴火鳳凰	Heung Chui-seung	ATV	
2007	Good Morning Shanghai	純白之戀	Wang Zhihao	various	
2007	Special Police	特警出擊	Yip So	various	
2010	Pandamen	熊貓人	Luo Han	CTS	Cameo
2014	The Exquisite Trap	玲瓏局	Fang Hanwen	XMTV-4	
2014	V Love	微時代	Hua Sanmao	QQ	alternative title: Microblog Time Love
2016	My Love to Tell You	我的愛對你說	Ding Fule	Liaoning Television	
2017	Hard Memory	失憶之城	Ice	BTV	
2018	The Great Adventurer Wesley	冒險王衛斯理	Wisely	iQIYI / TVB	

=== Variety and reality show ===
Year	English title	Original title	Role	Notes
2016	We Are in Love	我們相愛吧	Cast member	Season 2

=== Music video appearances ===
Year	Artist	Song title
2001	Gigi Leung	"Keep on Loving"
2003	Chris Yu	"The Woman Downstairs"
2004	Angela Chang	"Can't Calm Down"
2004	Stephanie Cheng	"Missing Protagonist"
2006	Stephanie Cheng	"Traffic Light"
2007	Ayumi Hamasaki	"Distance Love"
2012	Kary Ng	"Rén fēi cǎo mù" (as director)
2016	Super Girls	"Something Happened"

== Discography ==
=== Studio albums ===
Title	Album details	Track listing
Whether Or Not	Released: 21 October 2005; Label: Universal Music; Formats: CD, digital download	Track listing: 1. 晴天行雷; 2. 識笑識走; 3. 一二三紅綠燈; 4. 名牌; 5. 下一次真愛; 6. 南拳; 7. 風雨; 8. 交換; 9. 原因; 10. 角落; 11. 堅強
Not A Star 不是明星	Released: 13 April 2011; Label: East Asia Music; Formats: CD, digital download	Track listing CD: 1. 不是明星; 2. 給我一杯; 3. 喂！喂！; 4. 其實我們很熟; 5. 默背妳的心碎; 6. 男人愛麻煩 （余文樂/陳奐仁）; 7. 快瘋了; 8. 你說我太帥; 9. 有骨氣; 10. 給我一杯 （NIGO® REMIX）; DVD: 1. 不是明星MV; 2. 給我一杯MV; 3. 其實我們很熟MV; 4. 默背妳的心碎MV

=== Extended plays ===
Title	Album details	Track listing
Private Room	Released: 24 September 2002; Label: Universal Music; Formats: CD, digital download	Track listing: 1. Computer Data; 2. 全面收購 （music video）; 3. 全面收購; 4. 還你門匙; 5. 我哋; 6. 運動太好; 7. 紙巾; 8. 全面收購 （160mph Remix）
Lost and Found	Released: 5 September 2003; Label: Universal Music; Formats: CD, digital download	Track listing CD: 1. 失戀博物館; 2. 最愛指數; 3. 放心放手; 4. 兩湯一麵; 5. 愛快羅密歐; 6. 司機; 7. 一直等待; VCD: 1. 最愛指數 Music Video
The Survivor	Released: 17 November 2004; Label: Universal Music; Formats: CD, digital download	Track listing CD: 1. 生還者; 2. 南拳; 3. 雷霆傘兵; 4. 護衛; 5. 人民英雄; 6. 生還者 （Acoustic Mix）; 7. 堅強; VCD: 1. 生還者MV; 2. 余文樂 '生還者' 之三日兩夜外展訓練營

=== Single albums ===
Title	Album details	Track listing
Angel of Mercy	Released: 16 March 2002; Label: Universal Music; Formats: CD, digital download	Track listing: 1. 明知故犯
The Songbird Anthology	Released: November 2011; Label: East Asia Music; Formats: CD, digital download	Track listing: 1. 末日 (前 1'30")
Best Media Asia Music (East Asia + Capital Artists) 寰亞時代 (東亞)	Released: 8 March 2013; Label: East Asia Music; Formats: CD, digital download	Track listing: 1. 沉迷 ("車手"主題曲)
V-Love OST 微時代之戀 (電視劇原聲帶)	Released: 11 December 2014; Label: Shanghai Tan Xuan Music; Formats: CD, digital download	Track listing: 1. 第一次愛情

== Awards and nominations ==
Year	Award	Category	Nominated work	Result
2002	2002 Jade Solid Gold Best Ten Music Awards	Rising Star Song	"Return Your Keys"	Won
2002	2002 RTHK Top 10 Gold Songs Awards	Best New Male Artist (silver)	—N/a	Won
2004	2004 Jade Solid Gold Best Ten Music Awards	Outstanding Performance Award (silver)	—N/a	Won
2008	2008 Bucheon International Fantastic Film Festival	Best Actor	Rule No. 1	Won
2011	18th Hong Kong Film Critics Society Awards	Best Actor	Love in a Puff	Nominated
2017	23rd Hong Kong Film Critics Society Awards	Best Actor	Mad World	Nominated
2017	36th Hong Kong Film Awards	Best Actor	Mad World	Nominated
