= Perfect Wedding =

2010 Hong Kong film by Barbara Wong

- Film poster
- Traditional Chinese: 抱抱俏佳人
- Simplified Chinese: 抱抱俏佳人
- Hanyu Pinyin: Bào Bào Qiào Jiā Rén
- Jyutping: Pou5 Pou5 Ciu3 Gaai1 Jan4
- Directed by: Barbara Wong
- Written by: Lawrence Cheng
- Produced by: Lawrence Cheng
- Starring: Miriam Yeung; Raymond Lam
- Cinematography: Kenny Tse
- Edited by: Chung Wai-Chiu
- Music by: Mak Chun Hung
- Production companies: Shaw Brothers Studio; Television Broadcasts Limited; Sil-Metropole Organisation
- Distributed by: Intercontinental Film Distributors (HK); Sun Wah Media Group
- Release date: 21 October 2010
- Running time: 99 minutes
- Country: Hong Kong
- Language: Cantonese

Perfect Wedding is a 2010 Hong Kong film co-produced by Shaw Brothers Studio, Television Broadcasts Limited and Sil-Metropole Organisation.

== Cast ==
- Miriam Yeung as Suen Lok Yan (孫洛昕), a wedding planner of Perfect Wedding, Ling Yu Fung's girlfriend and Kelvin's ex-fiancé
- Raymond Lam as Ling Yu Fung (凌裕風), an Up & Down firm lawyer, Perfect Wedding's wedding witness lawyer, Sister Cha's son and Suen Lok Yan's boyfriend
- Teresa Mo as Doris, senior manager of jewelry chain
- Eric Kot as Cheng Wing Hong (Kelvin) (鄭永康), an internationally renowned photographer, Suen Lok Yan's ex-boyfriend and ex-fiancé
- Chrissie Chau as Flora, a Perfect Wedding wedding planner
- Kate Tsui as Remmy, a spa owner
- Bernice Liu as Mimi, senior counsel
- Ngo Ka-nin as Wing, a Perfect Wedding wedding image consultant
- Océane Zhu as Fanny, the head flight attendant
- Mak Ling Ling (麥玲玲) as Sister Cha (叉姐), Ling Yu Fung's mother
- Wen Jia Ni (翁佳妮) as Little Princess (小公主), Perfect Wedding staff
- Richard Ng as Mr. Yeung (大楊生), Louis Yeung's father
- Ken Hung as Louis Yeung (小楊生), Mr. Yeung's son and Vivian's fiancé
- Kathy Yuen as Vivian, Louis Yeung's fiancé
- Tats Lau as Mr. Chiu (趙先生), Mrs. Chiu's fiancé
- Ankie Beilke as Mrs. Chiu (趙太), Mr. Chiu's fiancé
- Pamela Peck as a show hostess
- Samantha Ko, who is brought by Sister Cha to accompany Fung when he and Yan broke up

== Awards and nominations ==
17th Hong Kong Film Critics Society Awards

- Won: Best Actress (Miriam Yeung)
