= Love in a Puff (film) =

2010 Hong Kong film by Pang Ho-cheung

- Film poster
- Directed by: Pang Ho-cheung
- Written by: Pang Ho-cheung; Heiward Mak
- Produced by: Subi Liang
- Starring: Shawn Yue; Miriam Yeung
- Cinematography: Jason Kwan
- Edited by: Wenders Li
- Music by: Alan Wong; Janet Yung
- Production company: Making Film Productions
- Distributed by: Media Asia Distribution
- Release date: 25 March 2010 (Hong Kong)
- Running time: 103 minutes
- Country: Hong Kong
- Language: Cantonese

Love in a Puff (traditional Chinese: 志明與春嬌; simplified Chinese: 志明与春娇) is a 2010 Hong Kong romantic comedy directed by Pang Ho-cheung and starring Shawn Yue and Miriam Yeung. The plot revolves around the love story of Cherie and Jimmy, two smokers who meet in an outdoor smoking area subsequent to the ban of all indoor smoking areas in Hong Kong. The film is classified as a category 3 film in Hong Kong due to numerous scenes of smoking.

Love in a Puff premiered at the 2010 Hong Kong International Film Festival.

A sequel, titled Love in the Buff was released on 29 March 2012 with the film being set in Beijing, China. Shawn Yue and Miriam Yeung reprised their roles. A third installment, Love Off the Cuff, was released on April 27, 2017.

== Plot ==
Since 2007, the Hong Kong government banned smoking in all indoor areas, causing smokers from neighboring buildings to gather for cigarette breaks during office hours at trash bins with ashtrays near their work premises. The regulars started engaging in small talk and sharing dirty jokes like friends at a hot pot dinner; this community became known as the "Hot Pot Pack".

Jimmy (Yue) is an advertising executive. He meets and befriends Cherie (Yeung), a cosmetic sales girl, at a "Hot Pot Pack" shortly after Jimmy broke up with his girlfriend who cheated on him. Over the next few days, Cherie flirts with Jimmy during their cigarette breaks, and through text messages and excursions at night, this eventually leads to Cherie's break up with her live-in boyfriend. On the night Cherie broke up with her boyfriend, they have a failed one night stand at a love motel. Shortly afterwards, Cherie asks to change to the same telco provider as Jimmy in order to save on costs, but the nuance of this action causes Jimmy to have doubts about his commitment to their relationship. Eventually, through a sequence of escalating conversations, Cherie forces them to confront the change in their relationship and consider whether they are viewing each other as love interest or just as companions during lonely nights.

== Cast ==
- Miriam Yeung as Cherie, a cosmetics sales girl
- Shawn Yue as Jimmy, an advertising executive
- Kenny Wong as Ka Ho, Cherie's boyfriend
- Cheung Tat Ming as Joseph, a hotel porter
- Miao Felin as a restaurant waitress
- Chui Tien-you as a 7-Eleven cashier
- Roy Szeto as Jimmy's colleague, an advertising executive and Patty's boyfriend
- Sharon Luk as Vivian, Jimmy's ex-girlfriend, an advertising executive
- Charmaine Fong as Patty, an advertising executive
- Yat Ning Chan as Isabel

Cameos

- Vincent Kuk as an advertising executive
- Jo Koo as Double K, Cherie's best friend
- Matt Chow as a Leisure and Cultural Services Department employee
- Cecilia Fong as Ka Ho's elder sister

== Reception ==
Perry Lam of Muse gave a positive review, as he observes that ‘No other Hong Kong movies in recent memory give a more vivid sense of how Hong Kong people talk in real life.’ China Daily placed the film on their list of the best ten Chinese films of 2010.

== Box office ==
Love in a Puff had a very poor opening weekend, mainly due to the Category III rating. However, the Category III rating was mostly due to the Cantonese profanity and heavy use of cigarettes in most scenes, and positive feedback on Facebook and various tweets resulted in a strong rebound, generating HK$5 million cumulative box office revenues after three weeks.
