= Love in the Buff =

2012 Hong Kong film by Pang Ho-cheung

- Film poster
- Directed by: Pang Ho-cheung
- Written by: Pang Ho-cheung; Luk Yee-sum
- Produced by: John Chong; Subi Liang
- Starring: Miriam Yeung; Shawn Yue; Xu Zheng; Yang Mi; Vincent Kok
- Cinematography: Jason Kwan
- Edited by: Wenders Li
- Music by: Janet Yung; Alan Wong
- Production company: Media Asia Films
- Distributed by: Media Asia Films
- Release date: 29 March 2012
- Running time: 111 minutes
- Country: Hong Kong
- Languages: Cantonese; Mandarin
- Box office: US$3.6 million

Love in the Buff (Chinese: 春嬌與志明) is a 2012 Hong Kong romantic comedy film directed by Pang Ho-cheung and starring Miriam Yeung and Shawn Yue. It is the sequel to the 2010 film Love in a Puff.

Principal photography began in mid-July 2011 at Hong Kong and was later moved to Beijing in early August, before finally wrapping up 30 August 2011. The film was released on 29 March 2012 in Hong Kong. It won the Audience Award in the competition section of the Osaka Asian Film Festival in 2013.

For her performance in the film, Miriam Yeung won the Best Actress award at the 32nd Hong Kong Film Awards.

A third installment, Love Off the Cuff, was released on April 27, 2017.

== Plot ==
Five months after the events in Love in a Puff, Jimmy and Cherie are currently living together. Jimmy is under much stress, working long hours. His previous boss, now working in Beijing, asks him to move there to work for him. Jimmy's commitment to his job and the decision to move to Beijing cause a rift in his relationship with Cherie. Eventually, they break up and he moves to Beijing.

On one of his business trips, he meets a flight attendant, You-you Shang, and they develop a romantic relationship.

Six months later, Cherie is also transferred to Beijing by her company. The two meet by chance but at this time, Cherie is also seeing a responsible and down-to-earth businessman, Sam. Jimmy and Cherie start to cheat behind Sam's and You-you's backs. Initially, they both have a good time going on a few dates, but soon Cherie wants more than the status quo. She breaks it off with Jimmy a second time. This time however, Jimmy decides to end his relationship with You-you and tries to win back Cherie, and in the end, succeeds.

== Cast ==
- Miriam Yeung as Cherie Yu
- Shawn Yue as Jimmy Cheung
- Yang Mi as Youyou Shang
- Xu Zheng as Sam
- Vincent Kok as Jimmy's colleague
- Roy Szeto as Jimmy's colleague
- Crystal Tin as Cherie's boss
- Ekin Cheng as himself (cameo)
- Linda Wong as herself (cameo)
- Huang Xiaoming as "man who looks like Huang Xiaoming" (cameo)
- Hao Lei (cameo)
- Yat Ning Chan as Isabel

== Reception ==
As of 3 April 2012, Love in the Buff has scored an 89% "Fresh" rating on Rotten Tomatoes.

=== Box office ===
After 4 days of its initial release in Hong Kong, the film has earned HK$9,301,112 in the box office and was no. 1 on the weekend of 31 March to 1 April at the Hong Kong box office.

== Closing Credits ==
Shawn Yue's re-enactment of Linda Wong's '90s hit song "Don't Ask Who I Am" was shown along with the closing credits. In the video, Yue dressed very closely as Wong, as well as mimicked Wong's facial expressions and gestures in the original video. This video has gone viral on social networking sites.

== Soundtrack album ==
A Love in the Buff original soundtrack was released on 30 March 2012.

Track listing:

1. 法國人惹的禍
2. Drenched (唱-曲婉婷)
3. Water Melon Bossa
4. Chop Pig Chair
5. 離開好地方
6. 好地方（北京版）
7. Rendezvous Valse
8. 我的歌聲裡 (唱-曲婉婷)
9. Anyway At All
10. Smoky Memory
11. He Said You Are Beautiful
12. Date In Bed
13. Queen Of Hea
14. What's Behind
15. Third Party
16. Flirt Again
17. Blind Date Club
18. Who's 余春嬌?
19. To Be Honest
20. 草坪，野餐，好舒服
21. 春天
22. Transparent Secret (EKIN version)
23. Mirror Of You
24. Why Couldn't Be Together Everyday?
25. Time To Leave, Bye!
26. Time To Chase You Back
27. 掛住你呀！
28. Love Means...
29. Love In The Buff
