= Miriam Yeung =

Hong Kong singer and actress (born 1974)

- 楊千嬅
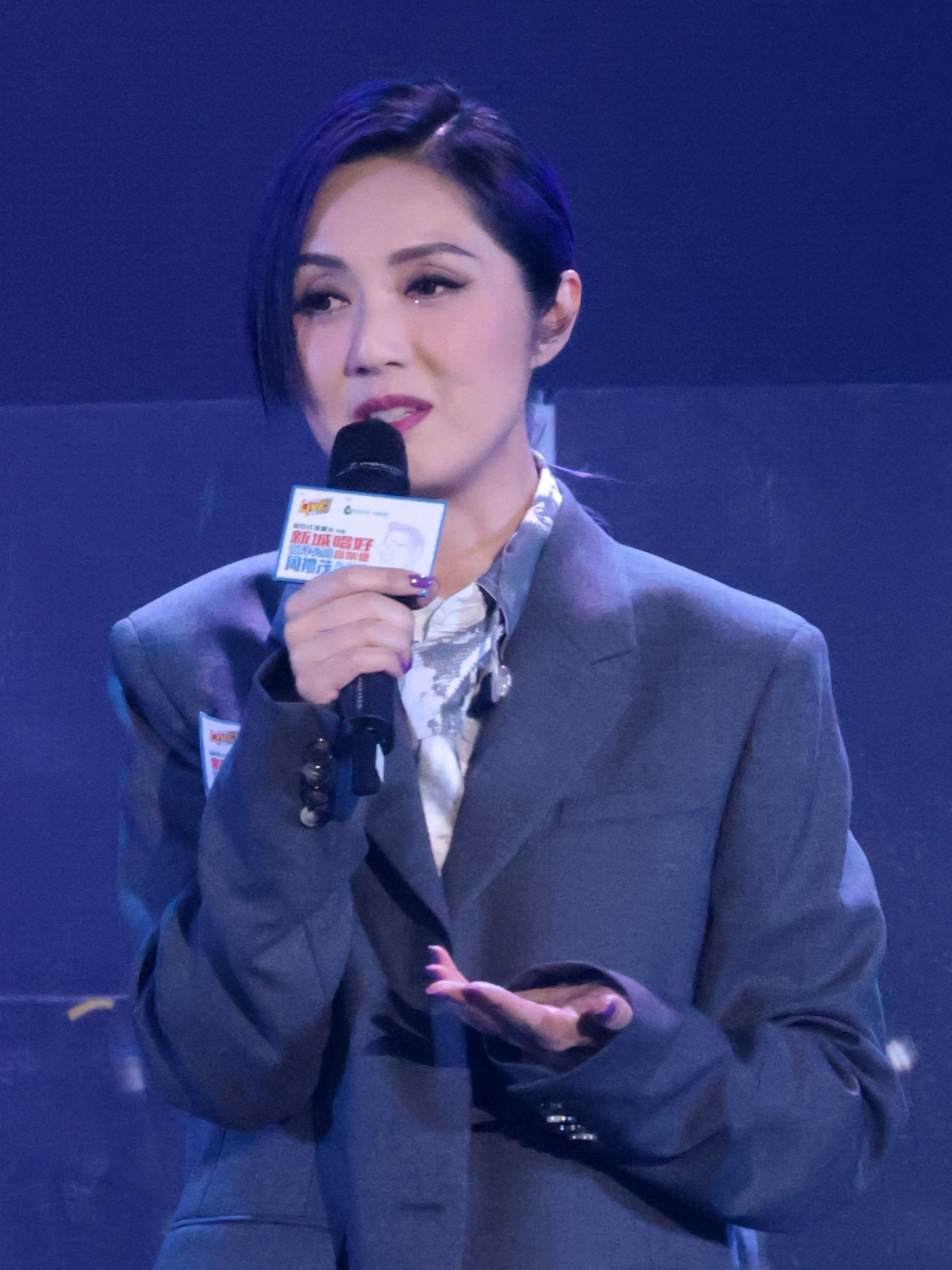
- Yeung in 2024
- Born: 3 February 1974 (age 52); Sai Ying Pun, British Hong Kong
- Occupations: Singer; actress
- Years active: 1995–present
- Spouse: Real Ting (m. 2009)
- Children: 1
- Awards: Full list
- Musical career
- Also known as: Yeung Chin-wah
- Origin: Hong Kong
- Genres: Cantopop; Mandopop
- Instruments: Vocals; piano; guitar
- Labels: Capital Artists; Universal Music; Gold Label; Amusic; Media Asia Music; Warner Music

Chinese name
- Traditional Chinese: 楊千嬅
- Simplified Chinese: 杨千嬅
Transcriptions
Standard Mandarin
- Hanyu Pinyin: Yáng Qiānhuà
Yue: Cantonese
- Yale Romanization: Yèuhng Chīnwah
- Jyutping: Joeng4 Cin1waa6
- Website: miriamyeung.com.hk

Miriam Yeung Chin-wah (born 3 February 1974) is a Hong Kong singer and actress. As of 2020, she has released more than 35 albums and has starred in more than 40 films. In 2012, Yeung won the Award for Best Actress at the 32nd Hong Kong Film Awards for portraying Cherie Yu in Love in the Buff.

Yeung studied at the Holy Family Canossian College in Kowloon and was a registered nurse at the Princess Margaret Hospital in Kwai Chung, Hong Kong. She began her career in entertainment after coming third in the TVB 14th annual New Talent Singing Awards competition in 1995.

== Career ==
=== Music ===
She began her career as a singer and actress after coming third in the TVB 14th annual New Talent Singing Awards competition in 1995, co-organised with Capital Artists.

Yeung has released more than 40 albums in Cantonese and Mandarin. Many of her songs have been mainstream hits and award winners, such as "Maiden's Prayer" (少女的祈禱), "Sisters" (姊妹), "Unfortunately I'm an Aquarius" (可惜我是水瓶座) and "Small City, Big Things" (小城大事).

She also performed a Cantonese version of "It's A Small World", at the opening of It's A Small World at the Hong Kong Disneyland theme park in 2008.

=== Acting ===
As an actress, Yeung has appeared in over 30 films with a total box office of around US$50 million worldwide, and had voice roles in three Korean and Thai movies. She won the Most Popular Artiste Award at Italy's Udine Far East Film Festival in 2002.

Her notable works include Sound of Colors, Drink, Drank, Drunk, Hooked on You, Perfect Wedding, Love in a Puff and Love in the Buff.

In 2011, Yeung won her first Best Actress award for Perfect Wedding at the 17th Hong Kong Film Critics Society Award. In 2013, she won another Best Actress award for Love in the Buff at the 32nd Hong Kong Film Awards.

In 2019, Yeung starred as the female lead in TVB drama Wonder Women. It was her first small screen appearance in 8 years. She won the Most Popular Female Character award at the 2019 TVB Anniversary Awards along with Selena Lee.

== Other work ==
In 2005, she was elected one of the Ten Outstanding Young Persons of Hong Kong by the Junior Chamber International Hong Kong.

Yeung is also involved in literature and drawing. She published Miriam Experience of School Entry in 1998, which encompasses short passages about her reflections on life, travel journals, and sharing with friends. In 1997, she made her first attempt at composing, a song named "The Writing is on the Wall" ("字跡").

== Personal life ==
In 2007, Yeung began dating ex-VRF member Real Ting Chi-ko. The couple married on 11 August 2009 in Las Vegas. After returning to Hong Kong, the couple held two wedding banquets in the Grand Hyatt Hotel in Wan Chai on 20 December 2010 and in L'hotel Island South in Aberdeen on 24 December 2010, inviting over 500 guests. She gave birth to their child Torres Ting, nicknamed "RMB" which means "Real & Miriam's Baby", on 5 June 2012.

In early 2013, Yeung was admitted to hospital for emergency surgery after an asthma attack.

== Filmography ==
=== Film ===
Year	English title	Original title	Role	Notes
1998	Rumble Ages	烈火青春1998	Wing	
1998	The Group	全職大盜	Coco	
2001	Dummy mother, Without a Baby	玉女添丁	LK Fong	
2001	Feel 100% II	百分百感覺2	Hui Fun	
2002	Love Undercover	新紮師妹	LK Fong	
2002	Frugal Game	慳錢家族	Wai Chin-wah	
2002	Dry Wood Fierce Fire	乾柴烈火	Alice Tsui	
2003	Dragon Loaded 2003	龍咁威2003	Yip Coo-hung	Cameo
2003	Love Undercover 2: Love Mission	新紮師妹2 / 新紮師妹2美麗任務	LK Fong	
2003	My Lucky Star	行運超人	Yip Ku-hung / Scholar Yip Ku-shing	
2003	Anna in Kung-Fu Land	安娜與武林	Anna Shek	
2003	Sound of Colors	地下鐵	Cheung Hoi-yeuk	
2004	A Disguised Superstar	冒牌天皇	Reporter	
2004	Three... Extremes	三更2	Li Qing	Segment: "Dumplings"
2004	Dumplings	餃子	Li Qing	
2004	Three of a Kind	煎釀三寶	Sophia	
2004	My Sweetie	甜絲絲	Ms Daughter	Cameo
2004	Elixir of Love	花好月圓	Heung / Princess	
2005	Drink, Drank, Drunk	千杯不醉	Fung Siu-min	
2006	2 Become 1	天生一對	Bingo Leung	
2006	The Heavenly Kings	四大天王	Herself	Cameo
2007	Hooked on You	每當變幻時	Miu	
2010	Here Comes Fortune	財緣萬歲	Office lady	
2010	Love in a Puff	志明與春嬌	Cherie Yu	
2010	Perfect Wedding	抱抱俏佳人	Yan	
2011	The Sorcerer and the White Snake	白蛇傳說	Rabbit Devil	Cameo
2011	Summer Love Love	戀夏戀夏戀戀下 / 夏日戀神馬		Cameo
2011	The Founding of a Party	建黨偉業	Young Hong Kong woman	Cameo
2012	Love in the Buff	春嬌與志明	Cherie	
2012	Vulgaria	低俗喜劇	Miss Leung	Cameo
2014	Aberdeen	香港仔	Cheng Wai-ching	
2014	Don't Go Breaking My Heart 2	單身男女2	Yang Yang Yang	
2014	Hello Babies	六福喜事	Cherry	Cameo
2014	Break Up 100	分手100次		Cameo
2015	Little Big Master	五個小孩的校長	Lui Wai-hung	
2015	She Remembers, He Forgets	哪一天我們會飛	Yu Fung-chi (adult)	
2016	Girl of the Big House	寶貝當家 / 小鬼當家	Nina	
2017	Love Off the Cuff	春嬌救志明	Cherie Yu	
2018	Agent Mr. Chan	棟篤特工	LK Fong	Cameo
2019	Missbehavior	恭喜八婆		Cameo
2019	I'm Livin' It	麥路人	Jane To	

=== Television ===
Year	English title	Original title	Role	Notes
1997	The Disappearance	隱形怪傑	Saan Saan	
1998	A Recipe for the Heart	美味天王	Yao Ka-ka	
1998	Moments of Endearment	外父唔怕做	Chung Lok-yee	
1999	Man's Best Friend	寵物情緣	Dau Dau	Voice
2001	A Taste of Love	美味情緣	Chou Bo-time	
2003	Hearts of Fencing	當四葉草碰上劍尖時		Cameo
2006	Stephen's Diary	老馮日記		Cameo
2006	Twist Love	讓愛自由	A-chun	
2007	Love at First Fight	武十郎	Wu Shi-lang	
2007	Colours of Love	森之愛情	Nicole	
2009	ICAC Investigators 2009	廉政行動2009	ICAC investigator Yeung Mei-kei	
2009	The Bronze Teeth IV	鐵齒銅牙紀曉嵐4	Qianqian	
2019	Wonder Woman	多功能老婆	Lam Fei	
