= Vincent Kok =

Hong Kong actor and filmmaker (born 1965)

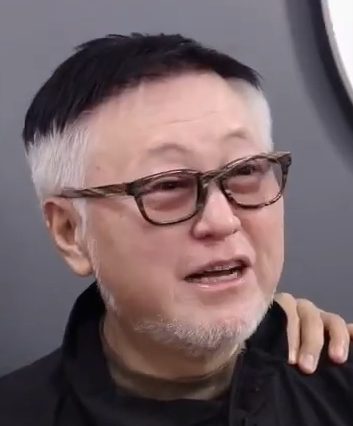
- Kok in November 2022
- Born: 15 August 1965 (age 61); British Hong Kong
- Occupations: Actor; film director; screenwriter
- Years active: 1993–present
- Awards: Golden Bauhinia Awards – (Won) Best screenplay award for You Shoot, I Shoot (2001)

Chinese name
Transcriptions
Standard Mandarin
- Hanyu Pinyin: Gǔ Dézhāo
Yue: Cantonese
- Jyutping: Guk1 Dak1-ciu1

Vincent Kok Tak-chiu (Chinese: 谷德昭; born 15 August 1965) is a Hong Kong actor and filmmaker.

Kok is best known for his frequent collaborations with Stephen Chow, acting and co-writing with him the films Forbidden City Cop, From Beijing with Love and The God of Cookery in addition to producing and co-writing Chow's 2007 film CJ7. He also made a cameo appearance in Chow's Shaolin Soccer as a hapless soccer player.

Kok also wrote, directed and starred alongside Jackie Chan in Gorgeous, a romantic comedy by the martial arts actor.

== Filmography ==
=== Film ===
- Flirting Scholar (1993)
- Love on Delivery (1994)
- Only Fools Fall in Love (1995)
- The God of Cookery (1996)
- Troublesome Night 2 (1997)
- Troublesome Night 3 (1998)
- Shaolin Soccer (2001)
- Marry a Rich Man (2002)
- My Lucky Star (2003)
- It's a Wonderful Life (2007)
- Adventure of the King (2010)
- Frozen (2010)
- Echoes of the Rainbow (2010)
- Fortune King Is Coming to Town (2010)
- Love in a Puff (2010)
- Mr. & Mrs. Incredible (2011)
- Magic to Win (2011)
- All's Well, Ends Well 2012 (2012)
- Love in the Buff (2012)
- Vulgaria (2012)
- Love is... Pyjamas (2012)
- Hotel Deluxe (2013)
- Hello Babies (2014)
- Overheard 3 (2014)
- Full Strike (2015)
- House of Wolves (2016)
- All My Goddess (2017)
- Two Wrongs Make a Right (2017)
- Keep Calm and Be a Superstar (2018)
- A Home with a View (2019)
- Mama's Affair (2022)
- A Guilty Conscience (2023)

Cantonese dub

- Chicken Little (2005)
- Happy Feet (2006)
- Ratatouille (2007)
- The Croods (2013)

=== Television ===
Year	Title	Network
2000	FM701	TVB
2023	Beyond the Common Ground	ViuTV

TV shows

Year	Title	Network	Role	Notes/Ref.
2020	King Maker III	ViuTV	Judge	EP21-26
2021	Nano Life Without Fire	ViuTV	Host	
2021	King Maker IV	ViuTV	Judge	Final Episode
2022-2023	The Popcorn Show	ViuTV	Host	
2023	The Popcorn Show 2	ViuTV	Host	
