= List of fictional pigs =

Pigs, species in the genus Sus, have appeared as fictional characters in various forms of media and popular culture.

== Advertising and mascots ==
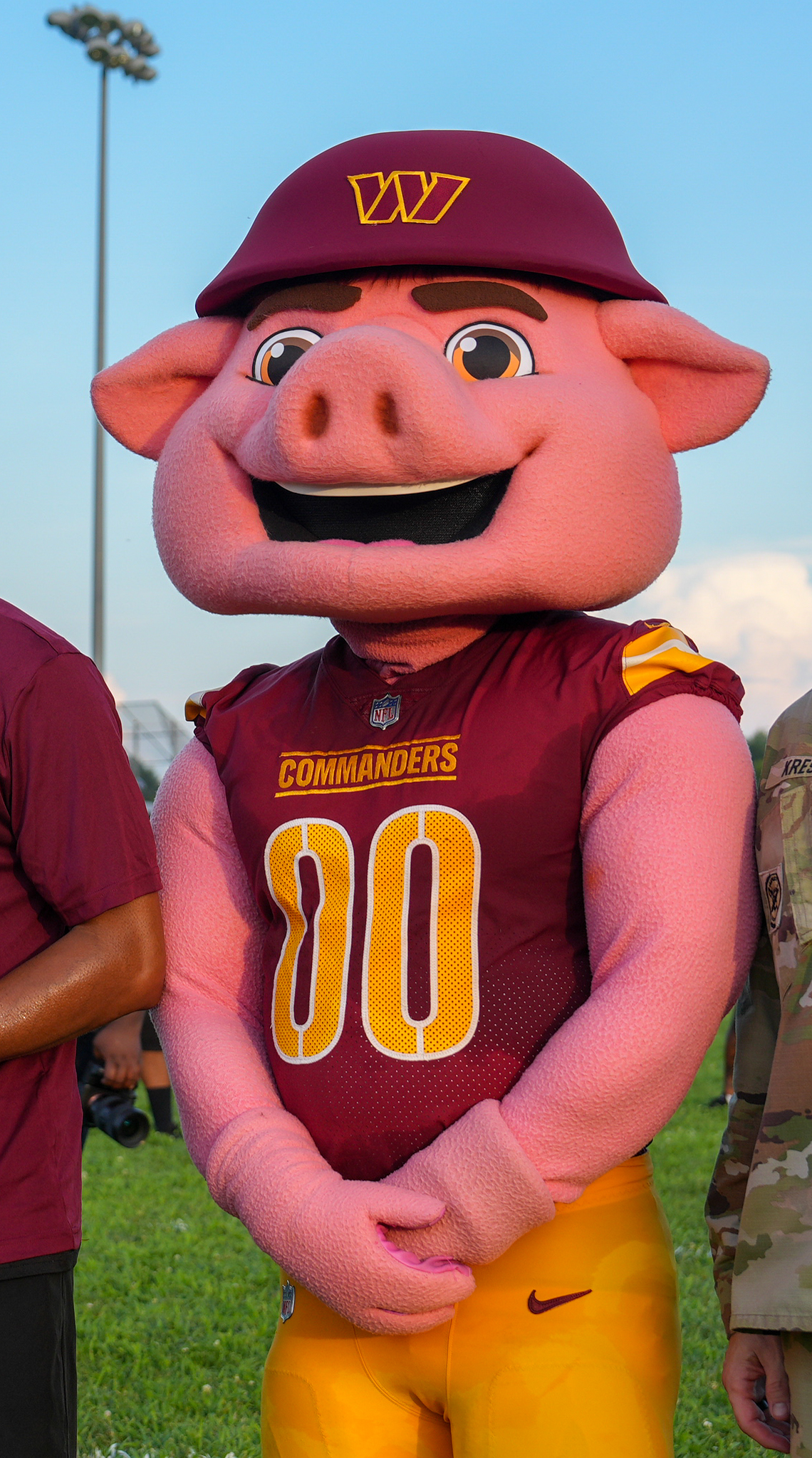
Major Tuddy in 2025

Name	Origin	Notes	Ref.
Big Red	University of Arkansas	The mascot of the Arkansas Razorbacks.	
LuLu the Piggy	Cici	An art toy sold by TOYZERO+.	
Major Tuddy	Washington Commanders	Major Tuddy was introduced on January 1, 2023. He is a homage to the Hogs, Washington's famed offensive line in the 1980s. "Tuddy" is a slang term derived from the abbreviation of a touchdown (TD).	
Nandarō	Nippon Television	The mascot of Nippon Television, designed by Hayao Miyazaki.	

== Literature ==
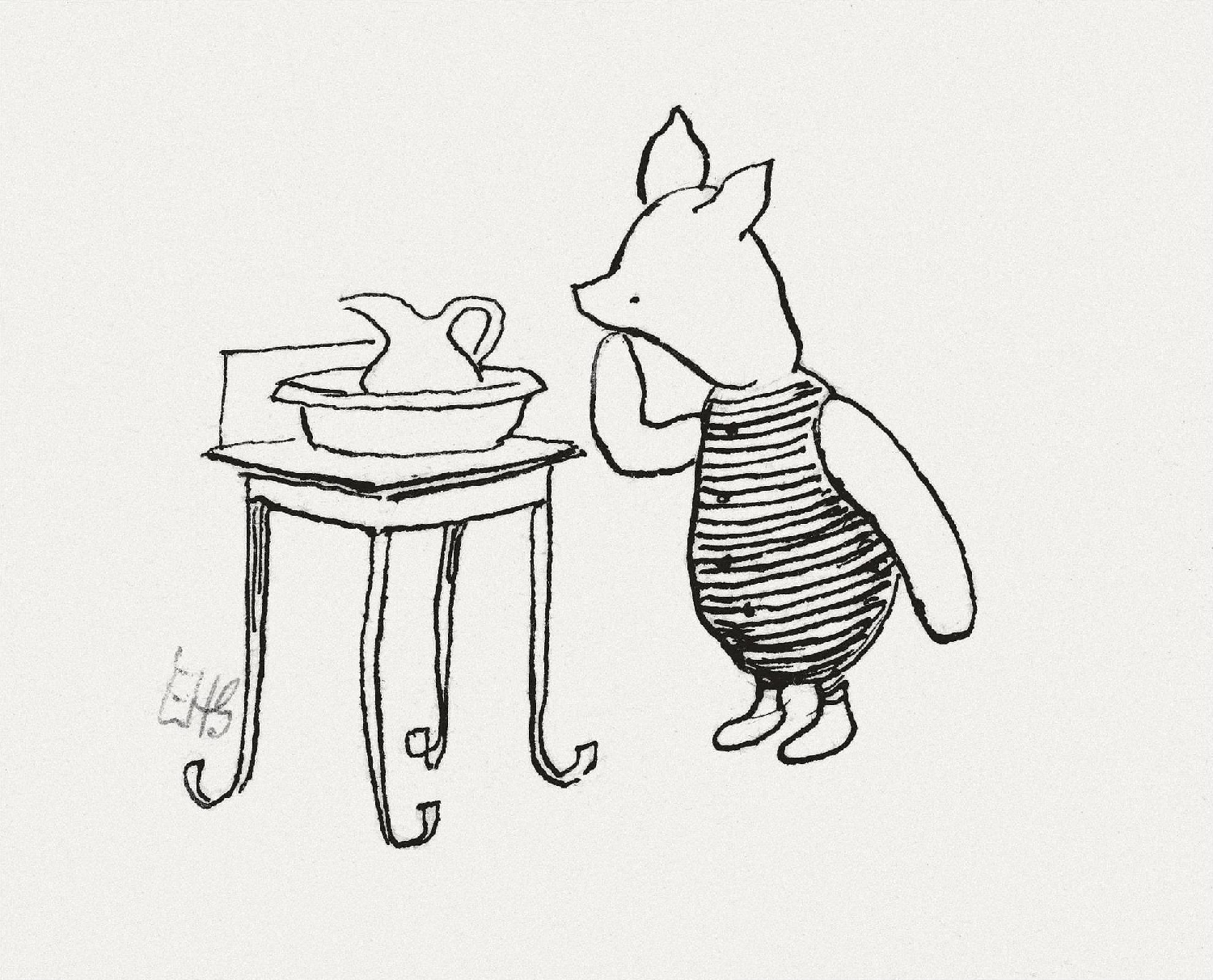
Piglet illustrated by E. H. Shepard

Name	Origin	Author	Notes	Ref.
Three Little Pigs	"The Three Little Pigs"	—N/a	A folk tale about three pigs that build houses to protect themselves from the Big Bad Wolf.	
Enchanted Pig	"The Enchanted Pig"	—N/a	A Romanian fairy tale about a pig that marries a princess.	
Freddy the Pig	Freddy Goes to Florida and sequels	Walter R. Brooks	The protagonist of 26 children's books.	
Napoleon	Animal Farm	George Orwell	The antagonist of Animal Farm, based on Joseph Stalin.	
Snowball	Animal Farm	George Orwell	An exiled pig in Animal Farm, based on Leon Trotsky.	
Squealer	Animal Farm	George Orwell	Napoleon's second-in-command.	
Old Major	Animal Farm	George Orwell	A pig philosopher in Animal Farm, based on Karl Marx and Vladimir Lenin.	
Olivia	Olivia books	Ian Falconer	A young pig girl.	
Piglet	Winnie-the-Pooh	A. A. Milne	The friend of Winnie-the-Pooh.	
Wilbur	Charlotte's Web	E. B. White	A livestock pig that befriends a barn spider named Charlotte that saves him from slaughter.	
Buta	Butareba: The Story of a Man Turned into a Pig	Takuma Sakai	The protagonist of an isekai light novel that turns into a pig.	
Empress of Blandings	Blandings Castle novels	P. G. Wodehouse	Owned by the doting Lord Emsworth, the Empress is an enormous black Berkshire sow, who wins many prizes in the "Fat Pigs" class at the local Shropshire Agricultural Show, and is the subject of many plots and schemes, generally involving her kidnap for various purposes.	
Pigling Bland	The Tale of Pigling Bland	Beatrix Potter	The book describes the adventures of the pig of the title and how his life changes upon meeting a soulmate, in much the same way that Potter's life was changing at the time the book was published.	

== Comics and manga ==
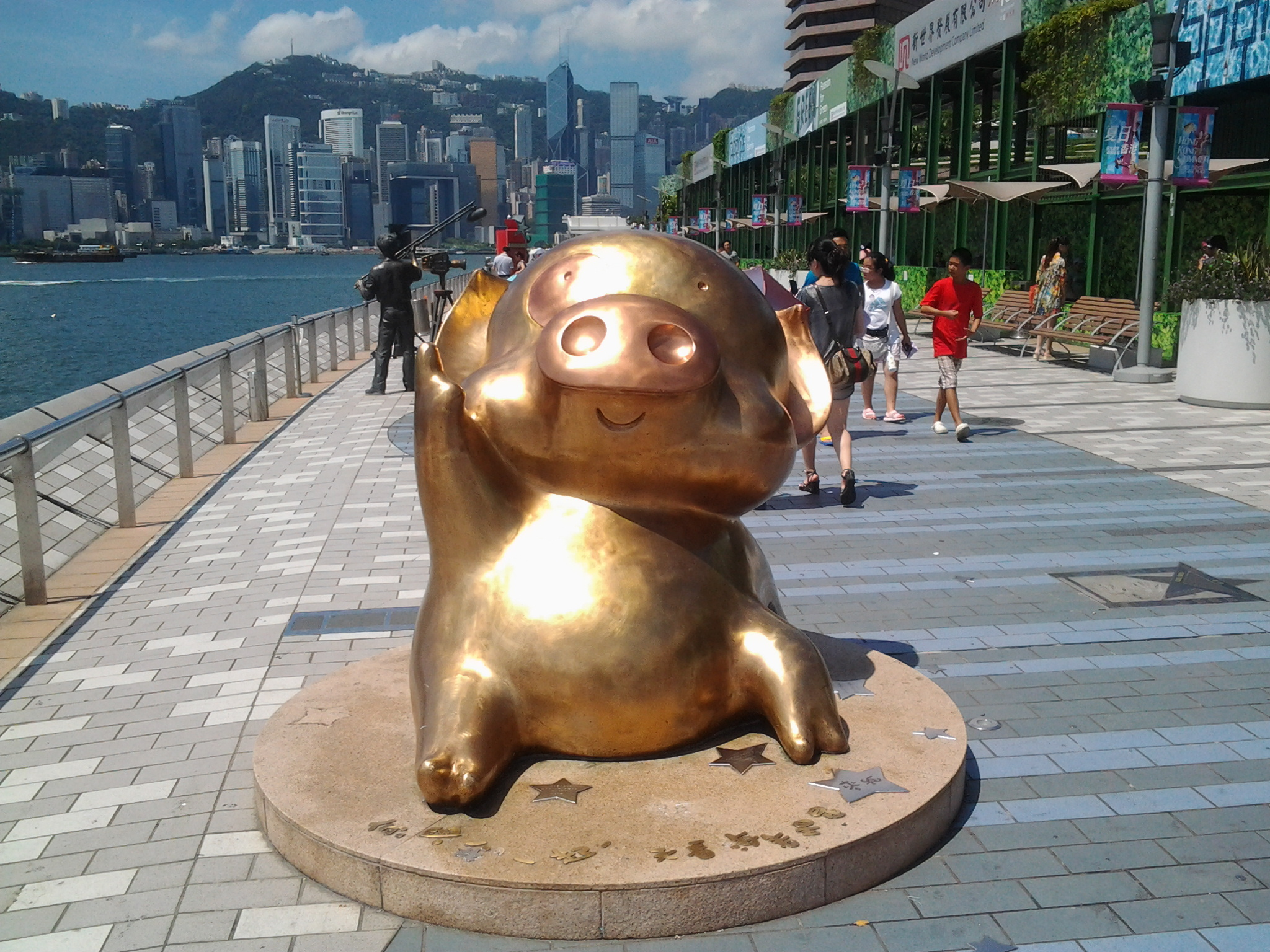
The statue of McDull on the Avenue of Stars, Hong Kong

Name	Origin	Creator	Notes	Ref.
Captain Goodvibes	Tracks	Tony Edwards	A crude pig associated with Australian surfing culture.	
Edmond Cochon	Edmond Cochon	Martin Veyron and Jean-Marc Rochette	A filthy anthropomorphic hybrid between a pig and a human.	
Cornfed	Duckman	Everett Peck	Sidekick of Duckman (in the animated TV adaptation he fulfills the same role).	
Hawk	The Seven Deadly Sins	Nakaba Suzuki	A talking pig that loves to eat.	
McDull	McMug comic strips	Alice Mak and Brian Tse	An anthropomorphic pig and the cousin of McMug.	
McMug	McMug comic strips	Alice Mak and Brian Tse	An anthropomorphic pig and the cousin of McDull.	
Oolong	Dragon Ball	Akira Toriyama	An anthropomorphic shapeshifting pig that joins Goku and Bulma on their quest for the Dragon Balls.	
Orson	U.S. Acres	Jim Davis	The protagonist.	
Pig	Pearls Before Swine	Stephan Pastis	A gentle, but dim-witted pig.	
Podgy Pig	Rupert Bear	Mary Tourtel	One of Rupert's friends.	
Priscilla	Boner's Ark	Mort Walker and Frank B. Johnson	A pig on board of the ark who is the girlfriend of Dum-Dum the gorilla.	
Rasher	Rasher	David Sutherland	A gluttonous pig who originated in Dennis the Menace and Gnasher, but later starred in his own spin-off comic.	
Salomey	Li'l Abner	Al Capp	Abner's pet pig.	
Spekkie Big	Spekkie Big	Marc van der Holst	A naïve pig.	
Spider-Ham	Marvel Comics	Larry Hama	An alternate-universe version of Spider-Man that is a pig.	
Wieske	Urbanus	Willy Linthout	Urbanus' pet pig.	
Wonder Wart-Hog	Feds 'N' Heads	Gilbert Shelton	A comedic underground comix parody of Superman.	
Ziggy Pig	Timely Comics	Al Jaffee	A pig character from the Golden Age of Comic Books.	

== Live-action ==
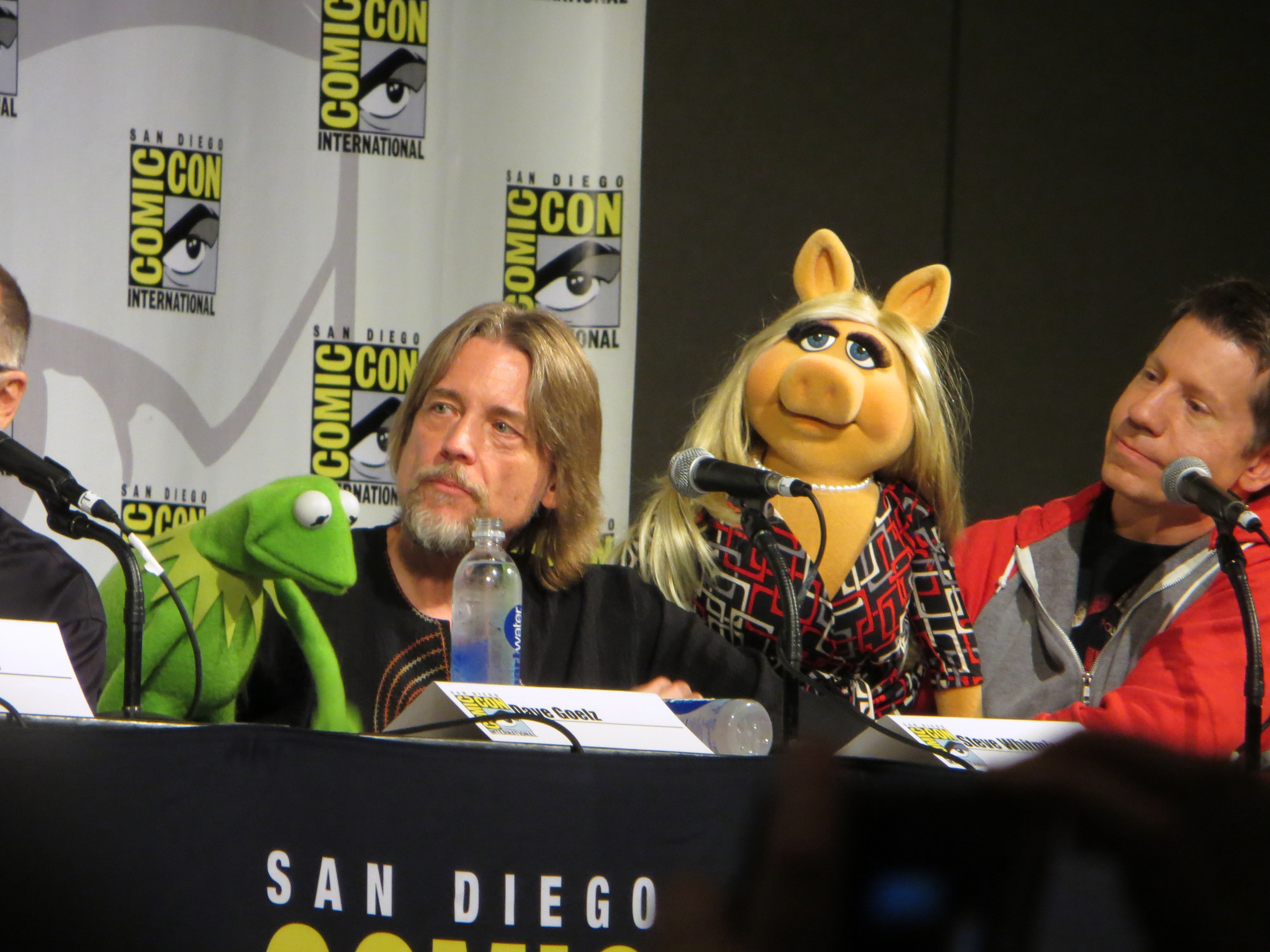
Miss Piggy at San Diego Comic Con 2015

Name	Origin	Notes	Ref.
Arnold Ziffel	Green Acres	A pig treated as the son of Fred and Doris Ziffel.	
Miss Piggy	The Muppet Show	A pig Muppet whose love interest is Kermit the Frog.	
Pinky and Perky	Pinky and Perky	A pair of singing pig puppets.	

== Animation ==
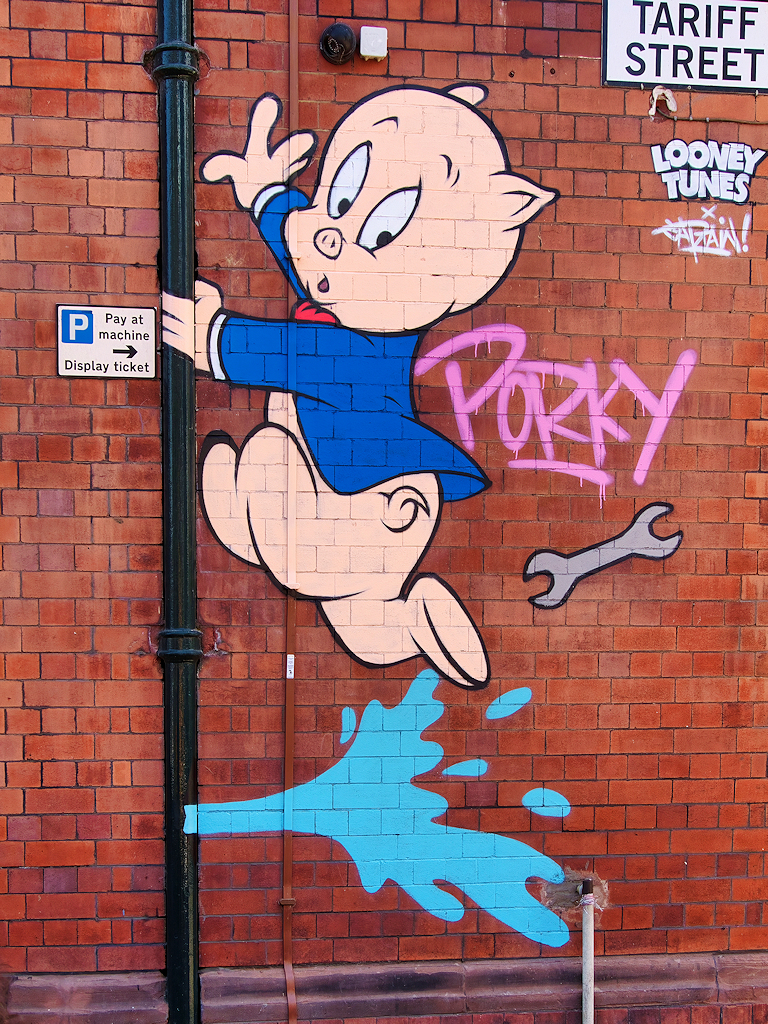
Porky Pig

Name	Origin	Notes	Ref.
Bebop	Teenage Mutant Ninja Turtles	A mutant warthog henchman of Shredder and enemy of the Teenage Mutant Ninja Turtles.	
Porky Pig	Looney Tunes	The oldest continuous running Looney Tunes character.	
Petunia Pig	Looney Tunes	The love interest of Porky Pig	
Peppa Pig	Peppa Pig	A pig from a British children's cartoon.	
Piggy	Merrie Melodies	An animated pig created to replace Foxy as the main character of Merrie Melodies.	
Pumbaa	The Lion King	A warthog that is a friend of Timon and teaches Simba about their "hakuna matata" philosophy.	

== Video games ==
Name	Origin	Notes	Ref.
Ganon	The Legend of Zelda	The archenemy of Link and Princess Zelda that sometimes takes the form of a pig.	
Piglin	Minecraft	A gold-loving species of humanoid pigs that live in the Nether. They may trade rare items for gold.	

== See also ==
- Pigs in culture
- List of individual pigs
