= McDull: Rise of the Rice Cooker =

2016 Chinese-Hong Kong film by Brian Tse

- Poster
- Chinese: 麦兜·饭宝奇兵
- Directed by: Brian Tse
- Written by: Brian Tse
- Starring: Zhang Zhengzhong; Sandra Ng; Anthony Wong; The Pancakes
- Music by: Steve Ho
- Production companies: Sunwah Media; Xingbao World; Entertainment Treasure; Long Media
- Distributed by: Xinyue Pictures; Sunwah Media; Jiangsu Huawen Tangxin Animation Investment; Tao Piao Piao
- Release date: 15 September 2016 (China)
- Running time: 90 minutes
- Countries: China; Hong Kong
- Languages: Cantonese; Mandarin
- Box office: CN¥18.3 million (China)

McDull: Rise of the Rice Cooker (Chinese: 麥兜·飯寶奇兵) is a 2016 animated comedy film directed by Brian Tse and featuring the Hong Kong character McDull. A Chinese-Hong Kong co-production, it was released in China on 15 September 2016.

== Plot ==
McDull develops an interest in inventing. A monster attacks Earth, and a competition arises to invent a robot that can defeat the monster. McDull's robot, a rice cooker, win. The school principal creates a machine to help recognise its thoughts. However, it takes a hundred years to make it work. Mcdull's mother and her friends help to shorten the time a lot. Secretly, the one who got placed second on the competition upgraded his robot for his son with the scientist, who was the principal's nemesis. The monster returns and kills many robots including the upgraded one. At last, the rice cooker fights the monster. It dies, but prevents the monster from killing Earth. McDull remains determined to invent more.

== Cast ==
- Zhang Zhengzhong as McDull
- Sandra Ng as Madame Mak
- Anthony Wong as School Principal
- The Pancakes as Miss Chan

== Reception ==
The film has grossed CN¥18.34 million at the Chinese box office.
