= McDull, Kung Fu Kindergarten =

2009 Hong Kong animated film by Brian Tse

- Theatrical release poster in Mainland China
- Directed by: Brian Tse
- Written by: Brian Tse; Alice Mak
- Produced by: Brian Tse; Chen Yingjie
- Starring: Anthony Wong; Sandra Ng; Kwok Kwan Yin; Jim Chim
- Narrated by: Wan Kwong
- Music by: Steve Ho
- Production company: Bliss Pictures Ltd.
- Release dates: 24 July 2009 (Mainland China); 13 August 2009 (Hong Kong)
- Running time: 80 minutes
- Countries: Hong Kong; Mainland China
- Languages: Cantonese; Mandarin
- Budget: HK$12,000,000

McDull, Kung Fu Kindergarten (Yue Chinese: 麥兜響噹噹; Mandarin Chinese: 麦兜响当当, also known as McDull Kungfu Ding Ding Dong) is a 2009 animated Hong Kong film directed by Brian Tse. Telling the story of the fictional piglet McDull entering a kung fu academy, the film is the fourth in the line of film starring McDull.

== Plot ==
The story begins as archaeologists discover a crudely made artifact while doing an archaeological study before the entire area was to be flooded following the construction of the Three Gorges Dam. The archaeologists identify it as being made by Mak-zi (also known as "McFat"), an ancient Chinese philosopher who had invented many things, but were arguably ahead of its time - for example, a myriad of electronic devices before the discovery of electricity. However, the crudeness of the artifact has led to the artifact being rejected for every museum in China and abroad, and thus, unwilling to destroy it, the artifact was set on a barge, continuously moving along the Yangtze River. The story continues on to Mak-zi's descendant 18 generations later, McDull, a kindergartener living in Hong Kong.

Due to mounting debts from failed ventures and economic hardships, McDull's mother, Mrs. Mak, decides to leave their home in Tai Kok Tsui to find fortune in the mainland. Arriving in Wuhan, Mrs. Mak, knowing that she cannot continue to take care of McDull while trying to make a living, decides to enroll McDull in the Spring Flowers Gate, a boarding Taoist martial arts academy in the Wudang Mountains, while she continues to ply her trade in Wuhan, Shanghai, Suzhou, and Hangzhou. McDull finds it hard to fit in, being ostracized by his peers at the academy due to being a Hong Konger. However, a mysterious Brother Panda encourages him to get closer and make new friends with his peers.

McDull eventually gets used to being liked by his friends, but when news of a prestigious martial arts competition, the International Kindergarten Martial Arts Competition, is to take place, nearly all of the students consider leaving the academy, McDull included. On the way down the mountain (as the mountain itself has no modern conveniences), McDull intends to call his mother to tell her that he was quitting the academy, but after a talk with the master's assistant, McDull learns about his master's plight: the headmaster had been a martial arts prodigy, mastering all forms of Chinese martial arts before the age of 20. When a published article by international action star Pruce Lee (a play on Bruce Lee) that claims that Chinese martial arts was on decline and was more suited for show than actual combat, the headmaster had respectfully disagreed. A war of wards was exchanged, and the two agreed to a match together. However, because of the political situation in China at the time, the battle, which would be later known as "The Battle of Luohu", was held at the Sham Chun River, the border between Hong Kong and Shenzhen. The two battled all night, but the match was eventually stopped by a Zen master. Returning home, the headmaster had strongly believed that he had lost the encounter, and thus went into seclusion, trying to modernize Taoist Kung Fu with little success. He then turned his attentions to opening the Spring Flowers Gate, taking on the guise of Brother Panda to get new recruits and to comfort students at the academy. McDull, moved by his sacrifices, decides to return to training, and calls his mother to tell her to attend the competition.

Eventually, the day of the competition arrives. While at the competition, McDull notices his friend from Hong Kong, May, who had enrolled in a "wire-fu" summer camp sponsored by Yuen Woo-Ping, also competing in the contest. Meanwhile, the headmaster has also received a revelation: at the competition, the headmaster of a rival school greets him, stating that he was a student of Pruce Lee. He goes on to state that Pruce had thought highly of the headmaster, and believed that the headmaster had won their encounter. Because of this, he had spent his last years extensively studying Taoist martial arts, and had written a book about the subject, which was dedicated to him.

Meanwhile, the Mak-zi artifact had wound up at the site of the competition, and, in front of a large televised audience just as McDull's match was about to begin, the artifact suddenly comes to life, revealing to itself as a crudely made clock in the shape of a chicken powered by cow feces which could count 100,000 years, 100 years at a time, using a complex holographic system. Inspired by the sight before her, Mrs. Mak decides to move back to Hong Kong to start a new business. McDull, having been beaten up badly in the competition, also returned to Hong Kong, having discovered Mak-zi's original blueprints for the clock in the meantime. Having returned home, McDull proceeded to build a new clock using the blueprints as a guide.

The story is concluded by a flashback from an adult May, who had gone on to become an office worker, suddenly noticing McDull's clock in the sky. Taking a break from her mundane life, she traces the clock to its location, and find a quaint restaurant in the middle of Hong Kong's concrete jungle, run by the adult McDull.

Throughout the film, viewers were also treated into various stories involving Mak-zi, in a pseudo-documentary style, narrated by Jim Chim.

== Cast ==
Cantonese cast:

- Kwok Kwan Yin as McDull
- Chen Lok Yuen as May
- Anthony Wong as Daoist, Professor and Panda Brother
- The Pancakes as Miss Chan
- Wan Kwong as Mcdull's Great-Grandfather, Mak-Zi / McFat
- Sandra Ng as Mrs. Mak
- Yu Chun Pak as Goose
- Jim Chim as narrator
- Ip Sum-Yee

Mandarin cast:

- Zhang Zhengzhong as McDull
- Zhang Likun as Daoist Professor
- Song Dandan as Mrs. Mak
- Huang Bo as narrator
- Shao Yibei
- Xie Haoxiao

== Production ==
The decision to set McDull, Kung Fu Kindergarten in mainland China resulted from the state of Hong Kong–mainland China relations. The film was co-produced between the mainland and Hong Kong, which required adherence to the regulations of Chinese cinema.

Originally produced under the title McDull Wudang, the film had a budget of HK$12,000,000 (approximately US$1,540,000), HK$3,600,000 of which was provided by the Film Development Fund of the Hong Kong Film Development Council.

== Release ==
McDull, Kung Fu Kindergarten released in mainland China on 24 July 2009. The film screened at UA Whampoa on 9 August 2009, and opened in Hong Kong theaters on 13 August. It screened as part of Ani-Asia! at the 14th Busan International Film Festival in October 2009.
