= 24th Hong Kong Film Awards =

2005 Hong Kong Film Awards

- Date: 27 March 2005
- Site: Hong Kong Coliseum
- Hosted by: Carol Cheng; Lawrence Cheng

The 24th Hong Kong Film Awards ceremony was held on 27 March 2005, in the Hong Kong Coliseum and hosted by Carol Cheng and Lawrence Cheng. Twenty-nine winners in nineteen categories were unveiled, with films Kung Fu Hustle and 2046 being the year's biggest winners. In conjunction with a hundred years of the Chinese cinema, a list of Best 100 Chinese Motion Pictures, consisting of 103 Chinese films selected by a panel of 101 filmmakers, critics and scholars, was also unveiled during the ceremony.

== Awards ==
The Star of the Century Award was a special award presented at the 24th Hong Kong Film Awards in celebration of 100 years of Chinese cinema. The award was posthumously dedicated to martial artist Bruce Lee with his daughter Shannon Lee collecting it on his behalf.

Hong Kong Film Award Star of the Century Award
- Awarded for: Star of the Century Award
- Country: Hong Kong
- Presented by: Hong Kong Film Awards
- First award: 2005

Winners are listed first, highlighted in boldface, and indicated with a double dagger (‡).

**Best Film**: **Kung Fu Hustle**‡; 2046; Breaking News; One Nite In Mongkok; New Police Story	**Best Director**: **Derek Yee — One Nite In Mongkok**‡; Wong Kar-wai — 2046; Johnnie To — Breaking News; Stephen Chow — Kung Fu Hustle; Benny Chan — New Police Story
**Best Screenplay**: **Derek Yee — One Nite In Mongkok**‡; Wong Kar-wai — 2046; Gordon Chan and Rico Chung — A-1; Stephen Chow, Tsang Kan-Cheung, Lola Huo and Chan Man-Keung — Kung Fu Hustle; Lilian Lee — Dumplings	**Best Actor**: **Tony Leung Chiu Wai — 2046**‡; Stephen Chow — Kung Fu Hustle; Alex Fong — One Nite In Mongkok; Daniel Wu — One Nite In Mongkok; Jackie Chan — New Police Story
**Best Actress**: **Zhang Ziyi — 2046**‡; Sylvia Chang — Twenty Thirty Forty; Yuen Qiu — Kung Fu Hustle; Cecilia Cheung — One Nite In Mongkok; Karena Lam — Koma	**Best Supporting Actor**: **Yuen Wah — Kung Fu Hustle**‡; Danny Chan — Kung Fu Hustle; Chim Sui-Man — Driving Miss Wealthy; Daniel Wu — New Police Story; Tony Leung Ka Fai — Dumplings
**Best Supporting Actress**: **Bai Ling — Dumplings**‡; Kate Yeung — Twenty Thirty Forty; Maggie Shiu — Breaking News; Candy Lo — Six Strong Guys; Jenny Woo — Yesterday Once More	**Best New Performer**: **Tian Yuan — Butterfly**‡; Jaycee Chan — The Twins Effect II; Huang Shengyi — Kung Fu Hustle; Race Wong — AB-Normal Beauty; Teresa Cheung — Colour Blossoms
**Best Cinematography**: **Christopher Doyle, Lai Yiu-fai** **and Kwan Pun Leung — 2046**‡; Anthony Pun — Leaving Me Loving You; Poon Hang-Sang — Kung Fu Hustle; Venus Keung — One Nite In Mongkok; Christopher Doyle — Dumplings	**Best Film Editing**: **Angie Lam — Kung Fu Hustle**‡; William Chang — 2046; David Richardson — Breaking News; Cheung Ka-fai — One Nite In Mongkok; Yau Chi Wai — New Police Story
**Best Art Direction**: **William Chang and Alfred Yau — 2046**‡; Oliver Wong Yui Man — Kung Fu Hustle; Yank Wong and Lam Ching — Jiang Hu; Man Lim-Chung — Colour Blossoms; Kenneth Yee and Pater Wong — Dumplings	**Best Costume Make Up Design**: **William Chang — 2046**‡; Lee Pik Kwan — The Twins Effect II; Shirley Chan — Kung Fu Hustle; Yank Wong and Petra Kwok — Jiang Hu; Yon Fan and Ho Tsz-Leung — Colour Blossoms
**Best Action Choreography**: **Yuen Wo-ping — Kung Fu Hustle**‡; Cory Yuen — The Twins Effect II; Chin Kar-lok — One Nite In Mongkok; Yuen Bun — Throw Down; Lee Chung Chi and Jackie Chan Stunt Team — New Police Story	**Best Original Film Score**: **Peer Raben and Shigeru Umebayashi — 2046**‡; Mark Lui — Leaving Me Loving You; Raymond Wong — Kung Fu Hustle; Peter Kam — One Nite In Mongkok; Surender Sodhi — Colour Blossoms
**Best Original Film Song**: **咁咁咁 — Mcdull, Prince De La Bun**‡; Composer: The Pancakes; Lyricist: Brian Tse and The Pancakes; Singer: The Pancakes; 兩個人的煙火 — Leaving Me Loving You; Composer: Mark Lui; Lyricist: Albert Leung; Singer: Leon Lai; The Attractive One — The Attractive One; Composer: Ronald Ng; Lyricist: Albert Leung; Singer: Joey Yung; 如果你有事 — Yesterday Once More; Composer: Lau Cho-tak; Lyricist: Albert Leung and Andy Lau; Singer: Sammi Cheng; 調情 — Magic Kitchen; Composer: Lam Yat Fung; Lyricist: Wong Wai Man; Singer: Sammi Cheng	**Best Sound Design**: **Steven Ticknor, Steve Burgess, Rob Mackenzie** **and Paul Pirola — Kung Fu Hustle**‡; Claude Letessier and Tu Duu Chih — 2046; Nip Kei-Wing and Benny Chan — One Nite In Mongkok; Kinson Tsang — Koma; Kinson Tsang — New Police Story
**Best Visual Effects**: **Frankie Chung, Don Ma, Tam Kai Kwan** **and Franco Hung — Kung Fu Hustle**‡; Guillaume Raffi, Sonia Holst, Nadir Benhassaine and Nicolas Bonnell — 2046; Victor Wong, Eddy Wong and Emil Yee — The Twins Effect II; Narin Visitsak — AB-Normal Beauty; Victor Wong and Ho Chi Fai — New Police Story	**Best Asian Film**: **Old Boy (South Korea)**‡; House of Flying Daggers (China); A World Without Thieves (China); Zatoichi (Japan); Quill (Japan)
**Best New Director**: **Wong Ching Po — Jiang Hum**‡; Barbara Wong — Six Strong Guys; Toe Yuen — Mcdull, Prince De La Bun	**Star of Century**: **Bruce Lee**‡
**Professional Achievement Award**: **Jackie Chan**‡; **Yu Mo Wan**‡
