= St. Clare's Girls' School =

Coordinates: 22°16′23″N 114°07′20″E

- 聖嘉勒女書院
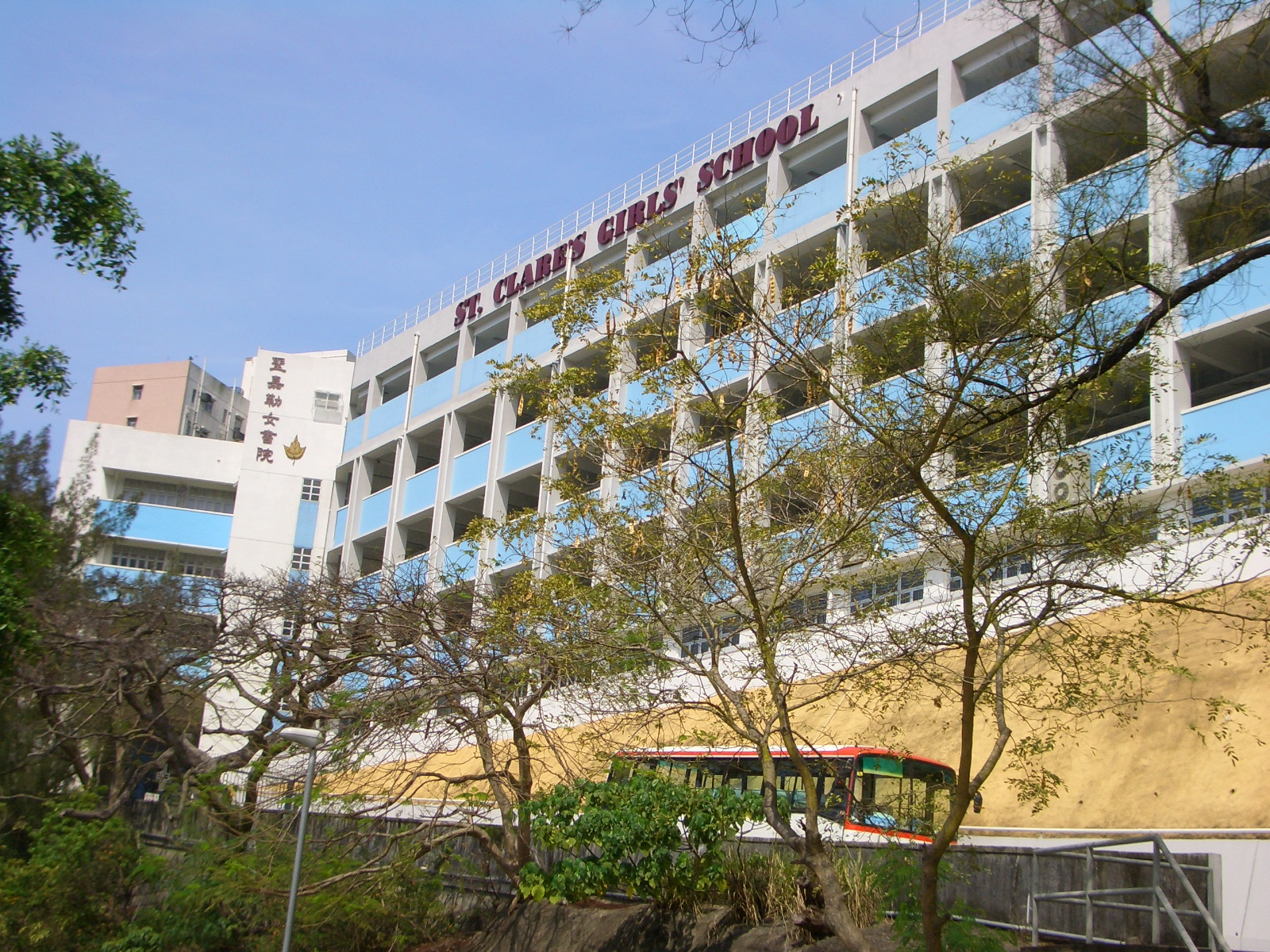
- 50 Mount Davis Road; Hong Kong

Information
- Funding type: Aided Secondary School, Grant School
- Motto: Veritas Vincit or Truth Conquers
- Denomination: Catholic
- Established: 1927
- School district: Central and Western District
- Principal: Cherry Chan
- Grades: S1-S6
- Campus size: 11,000 m^{2} (120,000 sq ft)
- Colours: White, red and blue
- Website: www.stclare.edu.hk

Chinese name
- Traditional Chinese: 聖嘉勒女書院
- Simplified Chinese: 圣嘉勒女书院
- Cantonese Yale: sing gā lahk néuih syū jún
- Jyutping: sing3 gaa1 lak6 neoi5 syu1 jyun2
Transcriptions
Standard Mandarin
- Hanyu Pinyin: Shèng Jiālè Nǚ Shūyuàn
Yue: Cantonese
- Yale Romanization: sing gā lahk néuih syū jún
- Jyutping: sing3 gaa1 lak6 neoi5 syu1 jyun2

St. Clare's Girls' School (Chinese: 聖嘉勒女書院; abbr.: SCGS) is a Catholic English girls' school located on Mount Davis Road, Central and Western District, Hong Kong. It was founded in 1927 by the Missionary Sisters of Our Lady of the Angels from Lennoxville, Québec, Canada.

== Vision and mission ==
=== Core values ===
In 2012, the Chronicle included the school in an article discussing the teaching of liberal arts in Chinese schools. but in 2015, the school cut Chinese history from the curriculum because so few students were interested in the class. The school has since then reinstated Chinese history in the senior form curriculum as an elective.

== History ==
=== Founding (1927) ===
The school was founded in 1927.

On December 3, 1926, sisters of Our Lady of the Angels from Canada came to Hong Kong to set up the school.

Mother Mary Gabriel, the school's co-founder, arrived in Hong Kong with three other sisters in 1926.

They rented a flat in Nathan Road, one of the poorest parts of the community at that time and evaluated the possibility of the project.

On 7 February 1927, an English institute was set up with seven students. The institute was named after St. Clare as suggested by Father Shak, and the school motto Veritas Vincit, which means Truth Conquers was adopted. It indicates that Christ is the foundation of the school as He is the way, the truth and the life.

At the end of February 1927, the sisters moved to 5 Peace Avenue in Ho Man Tin (spelt Ho Mun Tin or Homuntin in sources from the 1920s–30s). With the increasing number of students, the house at Peace Avenue was too small both for the students and sisters’ quarters. At the end of October 1927, they moved to 3 Argyle Street at Ho Man Tin.

=== Move to Prospect Place (1936) ===
Having taken the advice of Bishop Enrico Valtorta, the sisters started to establish themselves in the Chinese district. Eventually, Kennedy Town was chosen to be the new site of the school. The new school was opened in Sands Street in 1930. In 1936, the school moved to Prospect Place, Bonham Road.

In 1945–1946, the school was reorganised under a new educational system, with two sessions, the morning session for secondary and the afternoon session for primary.

=== Mt. Davis campus completed (1959) ===
Due to the increasing number of students Sr. Elizabeth du Portugal, the headmistress, started applying for a new school building in 1952. The new site at Mount Davis Road was granted by the government and officially opened on 28 November 1959 by the Director of Education Mr. Crozier, and blessed by Bishop Lawrence Bianchi.

In 2019 the Sunday Examiner reported on how the school celebrated 85 years since its founding. The event include a dinner and a performance by Frances Yip.

== Sponsoring body and founder ==
The congregation of the Missionary Sisters of Our Lady of the Angels is the sponsoring body of the school.

The Missionary Sisters of Our Lady of the Angels was founded by Sr. Mary of the Sacred Heart, a very young Canadian Missionary. In 1913, when Sr. Mary was in Guangzhou, she decided to set up a novitiate for Chinese Girls. She returned to Canada to pray and work for the idea. Two years later, with a young Canadian girl, she returned to Shantou at the invitation of the Bishop there. After contracting a fever, her companion died. Alone and with the war on, the Bishop advised her to return to Canada and try to found a novitiate there. She then left Shantou in 1915, together with a young girl of 17 whom she had known as a pupil in Guangzhou. That girl later became Sister Gabriel, the co-founder.

In June 1919, the first Novitiate was opened in Quebec, Canada. In 1922 five Sisters sailed for Guiyang in Guizhou. New groups continued to come to China until in 1949, when expelled from China, they had 14 houses, four of them in Canton.

Training of girls for the sisterhood was their first work and they did this in several dioceses, but they also had schools, hospitals and worked in leprosaria and in social work. Mother Mary Sacred Heart chose to follow the Franciscan rule due to coincidence. Their first house was near a Franciscan monastery, the Fathers there were her first mentors. So again she got what she wanted - to be a Franciscan with accent on poverty and humility, a badge that would distinguish the Sisters of Our Lady of the Angels to this day.

Today they have missions in Japan, Tahiti, South America, Africa, Macau and Hong Kong besides a recruiting centre in Canada and the United States. Everywhere they have novitiates.

The Sisters of Our Lady of the Angels are strictly missionaries. Their Mother Foundress always said if God wanted the work to go on, He would send vocations. Sister Mary of the Sacred Heart died in 1979. Mother Gabriel died in 1974 in Canada, after long years of work in China and Canada and incidentally the opening of St. Clare's in Hong Kong.

== Campus ==
The campus is equipped with various facilities, including four laboratories, student activity centre, library, conference room, campus TV room, R.E. corner, chapel etc. Apart from the classrooms, students can also have their lessons at special rooms like English Room, Language Room, Chinese Culture Centre, Multi Media Learning Centre, Supportive Education Room, etc.

Annual Thanksgiving Mass, Variety Show, Talk, Seminar are mostly held in the School Hall.

The chapel, which was one of the shooting sites for the romantic comedy All's Well, Ends Well, is located on the first floor.

== Song ==
The school song was written in 1947 by Sr. St. Raphael Sr. Elizabeth of Portugal and Sr. St. Bertha. Sr. Elizabeth of Portugal was the Principal at that time while the other two were taking their drop in school on mission. Sr. St. Raphael chose the melody of a flower song as the backbone. Sr. St. Bertha, the musician, helped with some modifications and rearrangements while Sr. St. Raphael herself and Sr. Elizabeth of Portugal filled in the words. And the school song, which lasts for 5:10 minutes, is classified as the longest school song in Hong Kong.

== Supportive measures ==
To cater to students' diverse learning needs, there are small split classes in F.1-F.2 English, F.1, F.4 & F.5 Chinese, F.5 Mathematics and F.1-F.2 Integrated Humanities. There are also remedial classes and enhancement programs for Chinese, Mathematics and English in various forms.

== Uniform ==
The students weather uniforms. There are summer uniform and winter uniform with entirely different design for the St. Clare's Girls' School.

The summer uniform is an all white one-piece dress. The winter uniform is a white shirt with a dark blue one-piece dress. For both of the uniform, four red buttons which represent the cardinal virtues Prudence, Justice, Fortitude and Temperance are decorated on the dresses.

== Notable people ==
- Elsie Leung Oi-sie, former Secretary for Justice of Hong Kong
- Alice Mak, creator of the cartoon characters McMug and McDull
- Frances Yip, singer
- Chrissie Chau, actress and model
- Ann Hui On-Wah: Hong Kong film director
- Nicole Sicard, a French teacher who reminisced about her time in Hong Kong which includes teaching at St. Clare's School
