= Anthony Wong =

Hong Kong actor and filmmaker (born 1961)

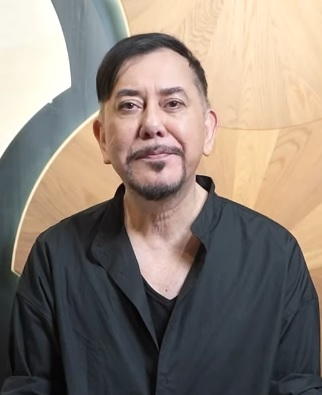
- Wong in September 2022
- Born: Anthony William Perry; 2 September 1961 (age 65); British Hong Kong
- Education: Hong Kong Academy for Performing Arts; École Philippe Gaulier
- Occupations: Actor; singer
- Years active: 1985–present
- Spouse: Ng Wai-zing (m. 1996)
- Children: 3
- Awards: Changchun Film Festival; Best Supporting Actor; 2002 Princess D Hong Kong Film Awards – Best Actor; 1993 The Untold Story; 1998 Beast Cops; Best Supporting Actor; 2002 Infernal Affairs; 2005 Initial D Golden Bauhinia Awards – Best Actor; 1998 Beast Cops; Best Supporting Actor; 2002 Infernal Affairs Hong Kong Film Critics Society Awards – Best Actor; 1998 Beast Cops; 2002 Infernal Affairs Golden Horse Awards – Best Supporting Actor; 2002 Princess D 2003 Infernal Affairs; 2005 Initial D TVB Anniversary Awards – Best Actor; 2015 Lord of Shanghai

Chinese name
- Traditional Chinese: 黃秋生
- Simplified Chinese: 黄秋生
- Hanyu Pinyin: Huáng Qiūshēng
- Jyutping: Wong^{4} Cau^{1}-sang^{1}

Anthony Wong Chau-sang (Chinese: 黃秋生; born Anthony William Perry; 2 September 1961) is a Hong Kong film actor, film director and singer, known for his intense portrayals of often-amoral characters. He has won the Hong Kong Film Award for Best Actor three times for The Untold Story (1993), Beast Cops (1998) and Still Human (2018), and won Taiwan's Golden Horse Award for Best Actor for The Sunny Side of the Street (2022). He is the first Hong Kong actor to have won Best Actor awards in films, stage theatre and TV. His other works include Hard Boiled (1992), Infernal Affairs trilogy (2002–2003) and the Hollywood film The Mummy: Tomb of the Dragon Emperor (2008).

== Early life ==
Wong was born Anthony William Perry on 2 September 1961 to a Hong Kong Chinese mother of Taishanese descent, Wong Juen-yee, and an English father, Frederick William Perry, who served with the Royal Air Force during World War II and later as a colonial officer. Frederick Perry walked out on the family when Wong was four, so he lived with his mother "in the staircase of a pre-war building in Wan Chai" until he was sent to live with various relatives for two years while his mother "held down three jobs." He kept in touch with his father through letters until they lost contact when he was 12 years old, and he knew that he had three older half-siblings from his father's marriage. He met his half-brothers in 2018.

In his acting career, Wong has established a reputation for openly critiquing the Hong Kong film industry and its practices, actors' performances and pop culture in interviews and his personal microblog. In some of those critiques, he revealed his experiences of being bullied and discriminated against—for being a "mixed race foreigner" and "during the 1960s, English-Chinese mixed race people like me were regarded as bastards" and for being born outside Hong Kong—while growing up in Hong Kong and during the early years of his acting career.

During his late teens, Wong moved to the United Kingdom to attend a college of further education. He returned to Hong Kong to attend a training course in hairdressing until he quit to join Asia Television's (ATV) training programme when he was 21.

== Career ==
After completing ATV's training programme, he continued his training at The Hong Kong Academy for Performing Arts. Wong trained under Philippe Gaulier at École Philippe Gaulier in France. He had stated in an interview that his mixed ethnicity initially caused him to be typecast as a villain, due to institutionalised racism in the Hong Kong film industry during this period. He nonetheless won a Hong Kong Film Award for his performance as a fictionalised version of serial killer Huang Zhiheng in the 1993 film The Untold Story.

In the following years, Wong appeared in a wide range of genre films including Rock n' Roll Cop, Hard Boiled, The Heroic Trio, Infernal Affairs, The Mission, The Medallion and the Young and Dangerous film series. Wong had also appeared in a number of international films, such as The Painted Veil and The Mummy: Tomb of the Dragon Emperor. In 1995, Wong made his directorial debut with The New Tenant. In a 2005 interview with Star eCentral, Wong stated that amongst his prolific output during the 1980s and the 1990s, a considerable number of films he appeared in were "terrible." However, he does not regret making those films, as he needed the money to support his family.

In 2014, Wong hosted TV show Dinner Confidential, where he would prepare one dish out of a table d'hote candle-lit dinner menu for guests. In 2015, Wong won the TVB Anniversary Awards for Best Actor and Best Drama for Lord of Shanghai, making him the first Hong Kong actor to have won Best Actor awards in films, stage theatre and TV.

== Personal life ==
Wong married his teenage sweetheart, Jane Ng Wai-zing, in 1992 but they lived separately. They have two sons, born in 1996 and 1998. Wong and Ng signed a divorce agreement in 1998 but did not file for the divorce. In June 2018, it was revealed that he had a son named William (born 1998) in the UK with a woman named Joyce, who is the niece of John Shum. Since 2020, Wong has been living with his wife Ng after 28 years of living apart.

In March 2018, Wong met his half-brothers, twins John William and David Frederick Perry, after a BBC story on Wong's search for his family was published. He also has a half-sister, Vera Ann. His father died in 1988 in Australia, where he and his first family settled after they left Hong Kong. His half-siblings did not know of Wong's existence until the BBC story was produced.

Wong is a supporter of the 2014 Umbrella Movement, a series of pro-democracy protests in Hong Kong. This has reportedly led to limited acting opportunities for him in mainland China. He has also voiced support for the 2019–20 Hong Kong protests. On 18 April 2021, Wong was approved for Taiwan's Employment Gold Card, allowing him to work in Taiwan without needing to apply in advance. It also allows him to receive tax incentives and National Health Insurance.

Wong speaks English, Cantonese, and Mandarin.

== Filmography ==
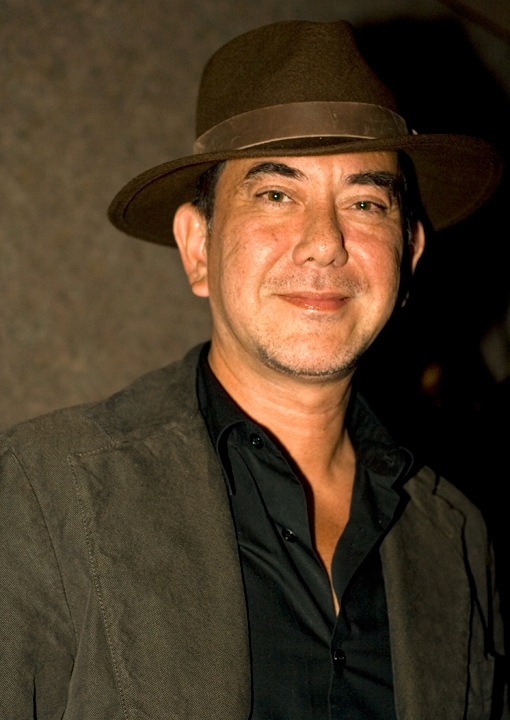
Wong at the 2008 Toronto International Film Festival

=== Film ===
| Year | Title | Role/Ref. |
|---|---|---|
| 1985 | My Name Ain't Suzie (花街時代) | Jimmy Koch |
| 1990 | When Fortune Smiles (無敵幸運星) | Wei (曹家大哥/飛飛大哥) |
| 1990 | No Risk, No Gain: Casino Raiders - The Sequel | Yeung Sing |
| 1990 | Dancing Bull (舞牛) | Ngau Ban-tsiu (牛品超) |
| 1990 | The Big Score (絕橋智多星) | Ma Kwan (馬坤) |
| 1991 | Erotic Ghost Story II (聊齋艷譚續集五通神) | Ng Tung/Chau-sang (五通（男魔）/秋生) |
| 1991 | Don't Fool Me | Nerd's brother Su (黑幫小弟) |
| 1991 | Casino Raiders II | Pow |
| 1992 | Sting of the Scorpion (蠍子) | Chow Kin (周健) |
| 1992 | Now You See Love, Now You Don't | Dunno |
| 1992 | What a Hero! | Saucer |
| 1992 | Hard Boiled | Johnny Wong |
| 1992 | Lucky Encounter (踢到寶) | Cheap Chan (賤人陳) |
| 1992 | Full Contact (1992) | Sam Sei (沈四) |
| 1992 | Angel Hunter (女校風雲之邪教入侵) | Kwok/The Bishop |
| 1993 | Rong shi qi an | Lau |
| 1993 | Biao jie, ni hao ye! III zhi da ren jia dao | Inspector Lu Ping |
| 1993 | Fight Back to School III | Tailor Lam |
| 1993 | The Heroic Trio | Kau |
| 1993 | Fu gui kuang hua | |
| 1993 | Huang Fei Hong dui Huang Fei Hong | |
| 1993 | The Untold Story | Wong Chi-hang |
| 1993 | 3 Days of a Blind Girl | Sam Chu |
| 1993 | A Moment of Romance II | Dino |
| 1993 | The Mad Monk | Nine Lives Beggar |
| 1993 | Cheng shi nu lie ren | Charlie Chan |
| 1993 | Executioners | Mr. Kim/The Faceless Monster/Kau |
| 1993 | Di shi pan guan | Kin |
| 1993 | Daughter of Darkness | Officer Lui |
| 1993 | Love to Kill | Sam-wai Wong |
| 1994 | Bomb Disposal Officer: Baby Bomb | John Wu |
| 1994 | Meng chai ren | |
| 1994 | Oh! My Three Guys | Best Actor Winner |
| 1994 | Ti tian xing dao zhi sha xiong | The prosecutor |
| 1994 | Xiang Gang qi an: Zhi xi xue gui li wang | Tong Chi-ming |
| 1994 | Yi xian sheng ji | Inspector Kim Kuo-hao |
| 1994 | Organized Crime & Triad Bureau | Ho Kin Tung |
| 1994 | Guang Dong wu hu zhi tie quan wu di Sun Zhong Shan | |
| 1994 | Saang Gong yat ho tung chap faan | Inspector Hung |
| 1994 | Gui mi xin qiao | Liu Sheng-ming |
| 1994 | Guai xia yi zhi mei | |
| 1995 | Er yue san shi | Raymond Shiu Chi-li |
| 1995 | Hai shi jue de ni zui hao | Wah Tino |
| 1995 | Jie fang chai ren | Lau |
| 1995 | Ma lu ying xiong II: Fei fa sai che | Doctor |
| 1995 | Xin fang ke | Alan Tam |
| 1995 | The World of Treasure | |
| 1996 | Tou tou ai ni | |
| 1996 | Mongkok Story | Lui Lone |
| 1996 | Xiu hua da dao | |
| 1996 | Jing hua rou bo jiang jian dang | |
| 1996 | Jin zhuang xiang jiao ju le bu | Host/Inspector Wong/Mr. Shaw/John |
| 1996 | Zhong guo 'O' ji zhi xie xing qing ren | Li Shu-pei |
| 1996 | Young and Dangerous 2 | Tai Fai |
| 1996 | Ebola Syndrome | Kai San |
| 1996 | Big Bullet | Bird |
| 1996 | Young and Dangerous 3 | Tai Fai |
| 1996 | Black Mask | King Kau |
| 1996 | Viva Erotica | Wong |
| 1997 | Armageddon | Chiu Tai-pang |
| 1997 | Hui zhuan shou shi | Shing |
| 1997 | Young and Dangerous 4 | Tai Fai |
| 1997 | Huo shao dao zhi heng hang Ba dao | |
| 1997 | Ng yun ji dai | |
| 1997 | Option Zero | Sing |
| 1998 | The Untold Story 2 | Officer Lazyboots |
| 1998 | Haunted Mansion | Ah Gi's Husband |
| 1998 | God.com | |
| 1998 | The Demon's Baby | Chin Hai-ching Hoi |
| 1998 | Young and Dangerous 5 | Tai Fei |
| 1998 | Beast Cops | Tung |
| 1998 | Quan zhi da dao | |
| 1998 | The Storm Riders | Sword Saint |
| 1998 | Jiang jian xian jing | Wong Lik-tak |
| 1999 | Raped by an Angel 4: The Raper's Union | Human Milk Drinking Doctor |
| 1999 | Erotic Nightmare | Lok Yep |
| 1999 | Wai Goh dik goo si | |
| 1999 | A Lamb in Despair | Charles |
| 1999 | Hak do fung wan ji sau chuk wong | Chiu-chau Tsam |
| 1999 | Fascination Amour | Eric |
| 1999 | Ordinary Heroes | Peter Kam |
| 1999 | Gou hun e meng | |
| 1999 | A Man Called Hero | Pride |
| 1999 | Heaven of Hope | Ah Wah (Brother Wah) |
| 1999 | Baan gwat chai | |
| 1999 | Hei she hui dang an zhi hei jin di guo | |
| 1999 | Century of the Dragon | Lam |
| 1999 | The Deadly Camp | Boar |
| 1999 | The Mission | Curtis |
| 1999 | The Legendary 'Tai Fei' | Tai Fei |
| 2000 | Violent Cop | Tai Pan-kim |
| 2000 | Evil Fade | |
| 2000 | Nu nan jue | |
| 2000 | Fist Power | Charles Chau |
| 2000 | Those Were the Days... | Dai Fei |
| 2000 | Q gei luen yan | Lam |
| 2000 | Yau sau tung dong | |
| 2000 | What Is a Good Teacher | ching |
| 2000 | Time and Tide | Uncle Ji |
| 2000 | Jiang hu: The Triad Zone | Master Kwan Wan-cheung |
| 2000 | Miu meng ji tiu | Wisdom |
| 2000 | Ai wo bie zou | Rock |
| 2000 | Metade Fumaca | |
| 2000 | Gen-X Cops 2: Metal Mayhem | Dr. Tang |
| 2001 | United We Stand and Swim | Coach Mao |
| 2001 | Yuk mong ji shing | |
| 2001 | Runaway | Ray |
| 2001 | Visible Secret | Wong Lin |
| 2001 | My Life as McDull | School Principal (voice) and Logan (voice) |
| 2002 | Gwaai sau hok yuen | |
| 2002 | Roaring Dragon, Bluffing Tiger | |
| 2002 | Yi wen ji bao biao | Peter's Dad |
| 2002 | Seung fei | Joker's Father |
| 2002 | Just One Look | Crazy |
| 2002 | Demi-Haunted | Hung |
| 2002 | Infernal Affairs | SP Wong Chi-shing |
| 2003 | Love Under the Sun | |
| 2003 | Cat and Mouse | Judge Bao Zheng |
| 2003 | The Twins Effect | Prada |
| 2003 | Kap sze moon yat goh gei kooi | Anthony |
| 2003 | Colour of the Truth | S.P. Wong Jiang |
| 2003 | The Medallion | Lester |
| 2003 | Fu bo | |
| 2003 | Infernal Affairs II | Inspector Wong Chi-shing |
| 2003 | Infernal Affairs III | SP Wong Chi-shing |
| 2003 | Golden Chicken 2 | Chow |
| 2004 | Magic Kitchen | Tony Ho |
| 2004 | 20 30 40 | Shi Ge |
| 2004 | McDull, Prince de la Bun | principal (voice) |
| 2004 | A-1 Headline | Lam Hei-fei |
| 2005 | Slim till Dead | Sergeant Tak |
| 2005 | House of Fury | Yue Siu-bo |
| 2005 | 2 Young | Nam's Pop |
| 2005 | Initial D | Bunta 'Tofuman' Fujiwara |
| 2005 | Mob Sister | Whacko |
| 2005 | All About Love | |
| 2006 | McDull, the Alumni | |
| 2006 | Isabella | Chen-shing's boss |
| 2006 | On the Edge | Lung |
| 2006 | Exiled | blazed |
| 2006 | The Painted Veil | Colonel Yu |
| 2007 | Sweet Revenge | Ching Shing |
| 2007 | Dancing Lion | Great Uncle |
| 2007 | Mr. Cinema | Zhou Heung-kong |
| 2007 | Simply Actors | Theatre janitor |
| 2007 | Secret | Chiu |
| 2007 | The Sun Also Rises | Teacher Liang |
| 2007 | Bullet and Brain | Brain |
| 2008 | The Mummy: Tomb of the Dragon Emperor | General Yang |
| 2008 | Plastic City | Yuda |
| 2008 | Ying han | Dragon |
| 2008 | True Women for Sale | Lau Fu-yi |
| 2009 | I Corrupt All Cops | Unicorn Tang |
| 2009 | Vengeance | Kwai |
| 2009 | McDull, Kung Fu Kindergarten | Principal/Master/Xiongbao (voice) |
| 2009 | Turning Point | Brother one |
| 2009 | The Last Night of Madam Chin | Cheng Rong-fa |
| 2010 | Legend of the Fist: The Return of Chen Zhen | Liu Yutian |
| 2011 | Punished | Wong Ho-chiu |
| 2011 | A Beautiful Life | |
| 2011 | A Simple Life | Grasshopper - Elderly home's owner |
| 2011 | The Woman Knight of Mirror Lake | |
| 2011 | White Vengeance | Fan Zeng |
| 2012 | Motorway | Lo |
| 2012 | McDull: The Pork of Music | principal |
| 2012 | The Four | Zhuge Zhenwo |
| 2012 | Naked Soldier | |
| 2012 | Westgate Tango | |
| 2013 | Ip Man: The Final Fight | Ip Man |
| 2013 | The Four II | |
| 2014 | Golden Chicken 3 | |
| 2014 | The Four III | |
| 2014 | McDull: Me & My Mum | |
| 2014 | Gangster Payday | |
| 2015 | Hot Blood Band | |
| 2015 | 12 Golden Ducks | |
| 2016 | The Mobfathers | |
| 2016 | McDull: Rise of the Rice Cooker | |
| 2017 | Cook Up a Storm | Mountain Ko |
| 2017 | The Sleep Curse | |
| 2017 | 77 Heartbreaks | |
| 2018 | Still Human | |
| 2019 | A Home with a View | |
| 2019 | Declared Legally Dead | |
| 2022 | The Sunny Side of the Street | |
| 2024 | Emmanuelle | The Eye |
| 2024 | Valley of the Shadow of Death | Pastor Leung |
| 2025 | Finch & Midland | Tony Wong |
| 2025 | Ballad of a Small Player | Casino executive |

=== Television series ===
- War of The Dragon 还我本色 (1989), Cheung King-to (张景图)
- The Justice of Life 他來自江湖 (1989), Johnson Man Chung-sun (文忠信)
- When Things Get Tough 午夜太陽 (1990), Tsing Kwan (程軍)
- The Witness of Time 天若有情 (1990), Hua Jing-sheng (程华京生)
- ICAC Investigators 2004 廉政行動2004 (2004), ICAC Chief Investigator Antonio Wong
- Kung Fu Soccer 功夫足球 (2004), Lam Chung-fu
- Eight Heroes 八大豪侠 (2005), Yan Tiexin
- Fox Volant of the Snowy Mountain 雪山飞狐 (2006), Hu Yidao
- The Legend of the Condor Heroes 射鵰英雄傳 (2008), Huang Yaoshi
- Memoirs of Madam Jin 金大班 (2009), Chen Rongfa
- The Legend of Yang Guifei 杨贵妃秘史 (2010), Emperor Xuanzong of Tang
- Chu Han Zhengxiong 楚汉争雄 (2012), Liu Bang
- Lord of Shanghai 梟雄 (2015), Kiu Ngo-tin (喬傲天)
- Margaret & David - Ex 瑪嘉烈與大衛系列 前度 (2017), Sham Joi-san
- Strangers (2018), David Chen
- Stained 心冤 (2018; aired in early 2019), Wayne Lau (劉偉義)
- The Republic 理想国 (2019), Sim Lap-ki (单立奇)
- Heaven on the Fourth Floor (Taiwanese TV series) 四楼的天堂 (2021), Tien Yi (天意)

== Theater ==
- Equus (May 2014)
- Le Dieu Du Carnage (August 2015)
- Le Dieu Du Carnage (Re-run - January 2016)
- Le Dieu Du Carnage (Huayi - Chinese Festival of Arts - February 2016)
- A Midsummer Night's Dream (September 2016)
- A Midsummer Night's Dream (Huayi Chinese Festival of Arts - February 2017)
- Speed-the-Plow (September 2017)

== Awards and nominations ==
| Year | Award | Category | Film | Result |
|---|---|---|---|---|
| 1993 | 12th Hong Kong Film Awards | Best Supporting Actor | Love: Now You See It... Now You Don't | Nominated |
| 1994 | 13th Hong Kong Film Awards | Best Actor | The Untold Story | Won |
| 1994 | 13th Hong Kong Film Awards | Best Supporting Actor | Rong shi qi an | Nominated |
| 1996 | 16th Hong Kong Film Awards | Best Supporting Actor | Young and Dangerous 3 | Nominated |
| 1999 | 18th Hong Kong Film Awards | Best Actor | Beast Cops | Won |
| 1999 | 5th Hong Kong Film Critics Society Awards | Best Actor | Beast Cops | Won |
| 2000 | 19th Hong Kong Film Awards | Best Actor | Ordinary Heroes | Nominated |
| 2002 | 39th Golden Horse Awards | Best Supporting Actor | Seung fei | Won |
| 2003 | 22nd Hong Kong Film Awards | Best Supporting Actor | Just One Look | Nominated |
| 2003 | 22nd Hong Kong Film Awards | Best Supporting Actor | Seung fei | Nominated |
| 2003 | 22nd Hong Kong Film Awards | Best Supporting Actor | Infernal Affairs | Won |
| 2003 | 40th Golden Horse Awards | Best Supporting Actor | Infernal Affairs | Won |
| 2003 | 9th Hong Kong Film Critics Society Awards | Best Actor | Infernal Affairs | Won |
| 2005 | 42nd Golden Horse Awards | Best Supporting Actor | Initial D | Won |
| 2005 | Asia-Pacific Film Festival | Best Supporting Actor | Initial D | Won |
| 2006 | 25th Hong Kong Film Awards | Best Supporting Actor | Initial D | Won |
| 2014 | 33rd Hong Kong Film Awards | Best Actor | Ip Man: The Final Fight | Nominated |
| 2015 | 19th TVB Anniversary Awards | Best Actor | Lord of Shanghai | Won |
| 2018 | 25th Hong Kong Film Critics Society Awards | Best Actor | Still Human | Won |
| 2019 | 38th Hong Kong Film Awards | Best Actor | Still Human | Won |
| 2020 | 25th Asian Television Awards | Best Actor in a Leading Role | The Republic | Won |
| 2022 | 59th Golden Horse Awards | Best Leading Actor | The Sunny Side of the Street | Won |
| 2022 | 29th Hong Kong Film Critics Society Awards | Best Actor | The Sunny Side of the Street | Nominated |
| 2023 | 41st Hong Kong Film Awards | Best Actor | The Sunny Side of the Street | Nominated |
