= SCGS =

SCGS may stand for:

- St. Clare's Girls' School, Hong Kong
- Singapore Chinese Girls' School, Singapore
- Sugarcane Grassy Shoot Disease
- Sunshine Coast Grammar School, Queensland, Australia
- Surbiton County Grammar School, England
- ICAO code for Siberia Airport (Aeropuerto Siberia), Bío Bío, Chile
