= Brian Tse =

Brian Tse may refer to:

- Brian Tse (writer), Hong Kong writer
- Brian Tse (singer) (born 1985), Hong Kong singer and actor
