= My Life as McDull =

2001 Hong Kong animated film by Toe Yuen

- Film poster
- Directed by: Toe Yuen
- Written by: Brian Tse; Alice Mak
- Produced by: Brian Tse
- Starring: Lin Yu Chau; Timothy Ho Yin Lok; Li Man Chi; Chan Siu Cheung; Anonymous
- Edited by: Toe Yuen
- Music by: Wong Long Kit
- Distributed by: Bliss Distribution Ltd.
- Release date: 15 December 2001
- Running time: 76 min.
- Country: Hong Kong
- Language: Cantonese

My Life as McDull (Chinese: 麥兜故事) is a 2001 Hong Kong animated feature film directed by Toe Yuen. The film surrounds the life of McDull, a hugely popular cartoon pig character created by Alice Mak and Brian Tse which has appeared on comics ever since the 1990s. In 2004, the sequel to this film, McDull, Prince de la Bun, was released.

Kelvin Chan of the South China Morning Post described McDull as "slow-witted".

== Awards ==
The FIPRESCI prize at the 26th Hong Kong International Film Festival (2002)

Grand Prix at the Annecy International Animated Film Festival, Annecy, France (2003)

== Synopsis ==
McDull is not the brightest kid, but he continually tries his best to please his mother. Although it seems that he may not be destined for great things in life as his mother wishes, McDull never gives up.

The story focuses on several tales about McDull and his childhood. This is told as a narrative reflection of a now adult McDull. These tales muddle up in imaginative uses of Cantonese and heaps of local Hong Kong culture. From tales about a turkey dinner to dreams of following in Lee Lai-shan's footsteps, McDull faces ebbs and flows with his demanding but devoted mother. In a part of the film, McDull decides to train to be an Olympic-level athlete like the Hong Kong Olympian Lee Lai-shan. However, the trade he learns is Cheung Chau bun-snatching. Realising that bun-snatching is not a formal sporting event in the Olympic Games, McDull's mother writes a letter to the chairman of the International Olympic Committee (IOC), asking him/her with her limited proficiency of English to sanctify the so-called sport event.

== See also ==
- Hong Kong–Maldives relations
