= Alice Mak =

Alice Mak may refer to:

- Alice Mak (cartoonist), Hong Kong cartoonist and artist
- Alice Mak (politician) (born 1971), member of the Legislative Council of Hong Kong
