= McDull, Prince de la Bun =

2004 Hong Kong animated film by Toe Yuen

- Film poster
- Traditional Chinese: 麥兜菠蘿油王子
- Simplified Chinese: 麦兜菠萝油王子
- Hanyu Pinyin: Mài Dōu Bō Luó Yóu Wàng Zi
- Jyutping: Mak6 Dau1 Bo1 Lo4 Yau4 Wong4 Zi1
- Directed by: Toe Yuen
- Screenplay by: Brian Tse
- Story by: Brian Tse; Alice Mak
- Produced by: Brian Tse
- Starring: Andy Lau; Sandra Ng; Anthony Wong; Jan Lamb; Chet Lam
- Edited by: Toe Yuen; Lee Chun-man; Brian Tse
- Music by: Steve Ho
- Production companies: Bliss Pictures; Lunchtime Production
- Release date: 24 June 2004
- Running time: 78 minutes
- Country: Hong Kong
- Language: Cantonese
- Box office: HK$19,218,759

McDull, Prince de la Bun (Chinese: 麥兜菠蘿油王子, literal title: McDull, the prince of the Pineapple bun with butter) is a 2004 Hong Kong animated comedy-drama film directed by Toe Yuen and starring the voices of Andy Lau, Sandra Ng and Anthony Wong. Telling the story of the life of the fictional pig McDull, it is a sequel to My Life as McDull (2001) and it was followed by McDull, the Alumni (2006).

There is significant word play in the film, some of it based on the "pineapple bun". For example, in slang Cantonese, a "bor lo goi" ("pineapple cap") is a colloquialism for kneecap. The Pancakes, who composed the film's theme song gum gum gum (Cantonese: 咁咁咁, literally "this, this, this"), was awarded Best Original Film Song in the 24th Hong Kong Film Awards.

== Cast ==
| Character | Chinese Voice actor | English voice actor |
|---|---|---|
| McBing | Andy Lau | |
| Mrs. McBing / Queen | Sandra Ng | |
| Principal / Doctor / Waiter | Anthony Wong | |
| Advertiser for burial plot | Jan Lamb | |
| Young McDull | Chet Lam | |
| House wife / fortune teller | May Che | |
| Miss Chan | Eman Lam | |
| Ghost voice | Cedric Chan | |
| Harry of Harry Pizza | Tsai Cheng-nan | |
| McDull | Lee Wing-yin | |
| Young Mrs. Bing | The Pancakes | |
| Jo Jo Ma | Michael Girad | |
