= McDull: Me & My Mum =

2014 Chinese-Hong Kong animated film by Brian Tse and Li Junmin

- Film poster
- Directed by: Brian Tse; Li Junmin
- Written by: Brian Tse; Alice Mak
- Produced by: Choi Koon-Shum; Brian Tse
- Starring: Zhang Zhengzhong; Sandra Ng; Babyjohn Choi; Li Yundi; Anthony Wong
- Edited by: Li Junmin
- Music by: Steve Ho
- Production company: Sunwah Media
- Release dates: October 1, 2014 (China, Hong Kong)
- Running time: 81 minutes
- Countries: China; Hong Kong
- Languages: Mandarin; Cantonese
- Box office: ¥36.71 million (China)

McDull: Me & My Mum (麥兜·我和我媽媽) is a 2014 animated family comedy film directed by Brian Tse and Li Junmin. A Chinese-Hong Kong co-production, it was released on 1 October in China and Hong Kong.

== Summary ==
The story begins with the investigation of a murder by an experienced detective of over 30 years (Anthony Wong. This detective, despite his experience, constantly fears being upstaged by the brilliant detective Bobby Mak (Babyjohn Choi in Cantonese, Huang Lei in Mandarin), to the point where his son sees Bobby, rather than his father, as his hero. With the pressure of the media converging on the crime scene and expecting a report, the detective is forced to swallow his pride and call in Bobby for assistance. After a cursory examination by Bobby and his assistant, Bobby concludes that the mystery would solve itself in one hour, without the need to catch the perpetrator, and orders the release of all of the suspects that the police had rounded up so far, declaring them all to be innocent. To pass the time, Bobby tells the gathered group of police detectives and suspects (a group of children who happen to be fans of Bobby) his own origin story.

As a child, Bobby was known as McDull (Zhang Zhengzhong), and he was raised in a small town of fewer than 20,000 people. Back then, he would often help out his mother, Madame Mak (Sandra Ng in Cantonese, So Pak Lai in Mandarin), who was an on-air talent for the local community television station, run by three people: herself, The Chief (Anthony Wong) and an assistant named Miss Chan (The Pancakes). At the time, McDull was not very bright: he often had to be reminded how to tell left from right based on which hand he would normally wear his wristwatch. Yet, Madame Mak would be a very stern, yet loving parent, who would always make time for him. On one occasion, when Madame Mak needed to be away - in her words, off to be an astronaut in space - McDull was taken into the care of a distant relative known only as his Uncle Cousin (Li Yundi). Uncle Cousin was the operator of a noodle cart, except that he only offered one kind of noodle dish, and would often set up shop in the middle of nowhere, where he served no one. After being bored the entire day, Uncle Cousin offers him a bowl of noodles, and McDull noted that even though the noodles were exactly the same as the many he had before, it somehow tasted better; Uncle Cousin explains that it is because he is bored and directionless that a simple bowl would taste better, as enjoying the noodles can cause people to reflect on their life's journey. Shortly afterwards, Madame Mak would return from space, and McDull would never see or hear of Uncle Cousin ever again.

Later on in life, amidst the rapid urbanization of his small hometown, Madame Mak would host a television show where McDull would pick numbers, encouraging viewers to use them to enter the Mark Six lottery. The show would be a failure, as after several weeks, McDull's picks would never even match a single time. Feeling responsible for the show's failure, McDull follows the advice of a classmate and encourages his mother to purchase six lottery tickets, each with one of the 36 numbers that he did not choose; in this manner, he claimed that (not understanding the rules of the lottery) winning the jackpot would be a guarantee. Indeed, Madame Mak had struck it rich (or so it seemed to McDull). With their newfound riches, she dresses McDull in nicer clothes and affords a better lifestyle for her son, yet encourages him to never tell anyone about the family's newfound wealth. When McDull asks his mother whether their newfound wealth means that he can have a pet dog, Madame Mak simply replies that they might be able to do so at a later point in time, and for now, they can pretend to have a pet dog that they name Bobby. Similarly, their new lifestyle meant that that they could afford pretend vacations to far-off places that were almost as good as being in the real place.

Despite striking it rich, however, Madame Mak had appeared to work even harder than before, especially following the closure of the television station; Madame Mak often had to take up many jobs to make ends meet. It is at one of those jobs where Madame Mak collapses and McDull is told that she has to take another journey into space. This made him wonder why, despite being rich, his mother still had to work so hard. Soon after his mother recovers, McDull openly contemplates quitting school so he can be closer to her, so that she would never be lonely pretending to be poor and going to space by herself. It is at this time that Madame Mak had revealed that she would never choose the 36 "unchosen" numbers for the Mark Six, out of her loyalty to him.

At this point, the clock strikes 4, indicating an hour has passed since Bobby has arrived at the murder scene. The murder victim suddenly awakens to the shock of everyone present: Bobby had already known that the victim was still alive and had merely passed out. In fact, all of the forensic specialists and emergency services that were summoned had arrived sometime within the hour and concluded as such, and everyone involved had been intently listening to Bobby's story. Seeing that the victim had recovered, Bobby and his assistant take their leave, but is implored by the gathered crowd to finish his story.

Later on in life, with no further misconceptions about being rich, the lifestyle of McDull and his mother had not changed. Madame Mak would go on to open many business ventures with The Chief and Miss Chan. After finishing secondary school, McDull would also take on a number of jobs, but would not end up being particularly good at any one of them, and would wind up working for his mother. After a particularly tough patch in his personal life, McDull decides to follow the path of his old classmates and become a fisherman, with the blessing of his mother. While he led a relatively carefree lifestyle as a sailor, he eventually grew more and more distant from his mother.

After a particularly good day where McDull and his friends had caught a large fish, he receives a call from The Chief, imploring him to return home, for his mother will go to space soon. As The Chief explains, after McDull had left, Madame Mak seemed to work even harder than before. During a period when the Mark Six jackpot had been at a record high, she had ultimately chosen to purchase six tickets consisting of the 36 "unchosen" numbers, only to find that there was not a single number that matched among her six tickets. Ultimately, by the time McDull returned home, his mother had already gone to space, seemingly never to return.

Following these events, McDull soon left to travel the world, lost without a purpose in life. His travels took him to places that he had only pretended to travel to as a child, but finding that the real place wasn't as glamorous as he imagined it to be. Eventually, his journeys took him to a place in the middle of nowhere, where he has a sudden craving for noodles. Enjoying a bowl and reflecting upon life, the lessons that were taught to him as a child come back to him. One day, McDull found himself at the old home of Frédéric Chopin, where he had the urge to play on one of Chopin's pianos. When he did, he played Chopin's music (performed by Li Yundi) perfectly, and everything that was muddled to him before suddenly became clear to him. Soon afterwards, he enrolled in a university in Europe, majoring in medieval European history. His thesis attracted the attention of Scotland Yard, where he received his training to become the brilliant detective now known as Bobby Mak. Bobby loves his job, but ultimately, every time he feels capable and confident, he is constantly reminded of his mother, who he believes is always with him in spirit.

Bobby's story ultimately moves the detective's son, among the suspects, to tearfully reunite with his father, begging him to never go into space. With a father and son reunited and the story concluded, the brilliant detective Bobby Mak and his assistant takes his leave.

== Voice cast ==
- Zhang Zhengzhong as McDull
- Sandra Ng as Madame Mak
- Babyjohn Choi as Bobby Mak
- Li Yundi as Uncle Cousin
- Anthony Wong as The Chief
- The Pancakes as Miss Chan

== Music ==
Track	name of the song	Singing
theme song	Goodbye Bruce Lee	Chan Yik Yi
episode	Xiao Shang Kou	Li Chung In Katrina Chan Siu Chun Yin 6A's Choir Leung Cho Yiu Wong Ka Wai's Chorus World
episode	Ru Guo Yang Guang Zhi Yan Bi	Li Chung In Katrina Chan Siu Chun Yin 6A's Choir Leung Cho Yiu Wong Ka Wai's Chorus World
episode	Yuan Shi	Li Chung In Katrina Chan Siu Chun Yin 6A's Choir Leung Cho Yiu Wong Ka Wai's Chorus World
episode	For You	Li Chung In Katrina Chan Siu Chun Yin 6A's Choir Leung Cho Yiu Wong Ka Wai's Chorus World
episode	Wo Zai Na Yi Jiao Luo Huan Guo Shang Feng	Li Chung In Katrina Chan Siu Chun Yin 6A's Choir Leung Cho Yiu Wong Ka Wai's Chorus World
episode	Asbury School Song	Li Chung In Katrina Chan Siu Chun Yin 6A's Choir Leung Cho Yiu Wong Ka Wai's Chorus World

== Reception ==
By 7 October, the film had earned ¥36.71 million at the Chinese box office.
