= Sandra Ng =

Hong Kong actress (born 1965)

- 吳君如
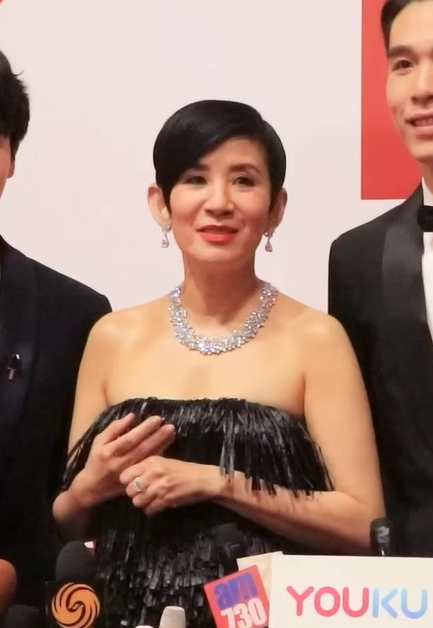
- Ng in 2022
- Born: 2 August 1965 (age 61); British Hong Kong
- Education: St. Stephen's Girls' College (secondary)
- Occupations: Actress; radio and television presenter; singer; film director; producer
- Years active: 1982–present
- Partner(s): Peter Chan (1996–present, de facto)
- Children: Jilian Chan (daughter)
- Parent: Kenneth Ng Kam Tsun (father)
- Awards: Hong Kong Film Awards – Best Actress; 1999 Portland Street Blues Hong Kong Film Critics Society Awards – Best Actress; 1999 Portland Street Blues Golden Horse Awards – Best Leading Actress; 2003 Golden Chicken

Chinese name
- Traditional Chinese: 吳君如
- Simplified Chinese: 吴君如
Transcriptions
Standard Mandarin
- Hanyu Pinyin: Wú Jūnrú
Yue: Cantonese
- Jyutping: Ng4 Gwan1jyu4

Sandra Ng Kwan-yue (born 2 August 1965) is a Hong Kong actress, film director and producer.

== Early life and career ==
The daughter of the actor Kenneth Ng Kam Tsun, Ng was born in Hong Kong, where she attended St. Stephen's Girls' College. Encouraged by her parents, she began her entertainment career at the age of 16. She is most known through her comic roles, where she often pokes fun at her plain looks. She has frequently collaborated with Stephen Chow, notably in All for the Winner, Magnificent Scoundrels and Royal Tramp, among others. In a career spanning over 20 years, she has filmed over 100 films and TV shows. She co-hosted Club Sparkle (星星同學會), a celebrity talk show, during the first half of 2009 and is also a radio personality for CRHK. Her radio program, He She Hit (她他她打到嚟!), aired from 12am to 2am on Monday to Friday.

In 1996, Ng dated Hong Kong film director Peter Chan. Later in 2006, they had a daughter named Jilian.

In 1999, Ng won Best Actress at the 18th Hong Kong Film Awards for Portland Street Blues.

In 2003, Ng won Best Leading Actress at the 40th Golden Horse Awards for her role as a prostitute in Golden Chicken.

In June 2022, Ng was invited to become a member of the Academy of Motion Picture Arts and Sciences.

In 2024, Ng's performance in Love Lies earned her a nomination for Best Leading Actress at the 61st Golden Horse Awards, marking her first in 21 years.

== Filmography ==
=== 1980s ===
Year	English title	Original title	Role	Notes
1984	The Duke of Mount Deer	鹿鼎記	Tsang Yau	Television series
1984	The Smiling, Proud Wanderer	笑傲江湖	Cousin Kwan	Television series
1985	Twinkle, Twinkle Lucky Stars	夏日福星	Tourist in Thailand	
1986	Peking Opera Blues	刀馬旦	General Tun's wife	
1986	The Return of Luk Siu Fung	陸小鳳之鳳舞九天	Kei-kei	Television series
1987	Happy Bigamist	一屋兩妻	Tung's friend	
1987	Trouble Couples	開心勿語	Agnes	
1987	Scared Stiff	小生夢驚魂	Judy	
1987	That Enchanting Night	良宵花弄月	Ling Shan-shan	
1988	The Inspector Wears Skirts	霸王花	Amy	
1988	Love Soldier of Fortune	愛的逃兵	Candy Ho	
1988	The Greatest Lover	公子多情	Lily Zhu	
1988	King of Stanley Market	褲甲天下	Gigi	
1988	Operation Pink Squad	霸王女福星	Ng Siu-mui	
1988	Three Wishes	黑心鬼	Ng Kwan-yu	
1988	In the Line of Duty III	皇家師姐III雌雄大盜	SCU agent	
1988	The Crazy Companies	最佳損友	Doriana	
1988	Two Most Honorable Knights	絕代雙驕	Third Lady	Television series
1988	The Crazy Companies II	最佳損友闖情關	Doriana	
1988	How to Pick Girls Up!	求愛敢死隊	Mei You-kong	
1988	My Father's Son	鬥氣一族	Wong Chor-yat	Television series
1989	In Between Loves	求愛夜驚魂	Ti	
1989	They Came to Rob Hong Kong	八寶奇兵	Comrade Monroe	
1989	The Romancing Star III	精裝追女仔之3狼之一族	Cocktail waitress at disco	
1989	Lucky Guys	福星臨門	Chan Pak-seung	
1989	Ghost Busting	捉鬼有限公司	Supervisor Kao	
1989	Little Cop	小小小警察	Insp. Wu	
1989	Crocodile Hunter	專釣大鱷	Bitchy Yuen Ying	
1989	Operation Pink Squad II	猛鬼大廈	Married policewoman	Also known as Thunder Cops
1989	Thunder Cops II	流氓差婆 / 雌雄雙辣	Fong Ngoi-nam	
1989	Funny Ghost	猛鬼撞鬼	Gamble Yu	
1989	The Inspector Wears Skirts II	神勇飛虎霸王花	Amy	
1989	Vampire vs Vampire	一眉道人	General's Cousin	

=== 1990s ===
Year	English title	Original title	Role	Notes
1990	All for the Winner	賭聖	Ping	
1990	The Spooky Family	捉鬼合家歡	Customer	
1990	She Shoots Straight	皇家女將	Huang Chia-ju	
1990	Here Comes a Vampire	猛鬼霸王花	Sister Nine	
1990	Ghostly Vixen	天師捉姦	May	
1990	Raid on Royal Casino Marine	霸王花之皇家賭船	Amy	Also known as The Inspector Wears Skirts III
1990	Love Is Love	望夫成龍	Ng Dai-tai	
1990	Mortuary Blues	屍家重地	9th Sister	
1990	When Fortune Smiles	無敵幸運星	Rubbish Feng / Chao Fei-fei	
1990	Vampires Settle on the Police Camp	一眉道姑	Madam Lee	
1990	Fire Phoenix	橫衝直撞火鳳凰 / 借槍借人	Madam Lee	Also known as Borrowing the Gun
1991	Money Maker	贏錢專家	Siu-siu	
1991	Top Bet	賭霸	Ping	
1991	You Bet Your Life	一世好命	May	Also known as A Charmed Life
1991	God of Gamblers III: Back to Shanghai	賭俠II上海灘賭聖	Spring	
1991	Vampire Kids	殭屍福星仔	Tour guide	
1991	The Banquet	豪門夜宴	Waitress	Also known as Party of a Wealthy Family
1991	Magnificent Scoundrels	情聖	Jenny	
1991	Return of the Evil Fox	猛鬼狐狸精	Big Yu	
1991	The Family Squad	卡拉屋企	方小橋	Television series
1992	True Love	真的愛妳	Paula	
1992	Ghost in Me	老友鬼上身	Joe Mack	
1992	Gameboy Kids	機Boy小子之真假威龍	Veronica	
1992	Cash on Delivery	與鴨共舞	Sandy Koh	
1992	The Inspector Wears Skirts 4	'92霸王花與霸王花	Amy	
1992	Casino Tycoon II	賭城大亨II之至尊無敵	Chu Lin-lin	
1992	Hero of the Beggars	丐世英雄	Yue	
1992	Sisters in Law	積奇&瑪莉	Jacky	
1992	Forced Nightmare	嘩鬼旅行團		
1992	All's Well, Ends Well	家有囍事	Ching	
1992	My Americanized Wife	兩屋一妻		Cameo
1992	Royal Tramp	鹿鼎記	Sister Bond	
1992	Royal Tramp II	鹿鼎記II神龍教	Sister Bond	
1992	Miracle 90 Days	特異功能猩求人	Woman who has supernatural powers	
1992	Mr. Vampire 1992	新殭屍先生	Birdie	Also known as Chinese Vampire Story
1992	Changing Partner	夜夜伴肥嬌	Yue	
1993	Holy Weapon	武俠七公主	Yam Kin-fai	
1993	All's Well, Ends Well Too	花田囍事	Gut	
1993	Boys Are Easy	追男仔	Chi Sum	
1993	Perfect Couples	皆大歡喜	Chung Lai-ming	
1993	King Swindler	龍父虎子 / 大小老千		
1993	Vampire Family	一屋哨牙鬼	Ginger	
1993	The Eight Hilarious Gods	笑八仙	Buddy Wall	
1994	Her Fatal Ways 4	表姐，妳好野！4	Siu Yu	
1994	The Returning	等著你回來	Julia	
1994	Fire Dragon	火雲傳奇	Tang Lyn-yu	
1994	Modern Romance	戀愛的天空	Frankie Chan Bo-chu	
1994	I Will Wait for You	年年有今日	Mei-lan	
1994	Always Be the Winners	神龍賭聖之旗開得勝	Mrs. Lulu Sha	
1994	To Live and Die in Tsimshatsui	新邊緣人	Woman in movie	Uncredited
1994	Crazy Women	飛越瘋人院 / 傻大姐翻轉瘋人院		
1996	4 Faces of Eve	4面夏娃	Gam Mo / Chan Giu / Miu Si / Mei Mei	
1997	Young and Dangerous 4	97古惑仔戰無不勝	Sister 13	
1997	Black Rose II	黑玫瑰義結金蘭	Sandra Suen May-tong	
1997	Killing Me Tenderly	愛您愛到殺死你	Siu	
1997	Mahjong Dragon	麻雀飛龍	Prostitute	
1998	Young and Dangerous 5	98古惑仔之龍爭虎鬥	Sister 13	
1998	The Lucky Guy	行運一條龍	Flirty Si	
1998	Young and Dangerous: The Prequel	新古惑仔之少年激鬥篇	Sister 13	Cameo
1998	Portland Street Blues	古惑仔情義篇之洪興十三妹	Sister 13	
1998	Hold You Tight	愈快樂愈墮落	Video shop owner	
1999	Tarzan	—N/a	Terk	Cantonese dub
1999	Gorgeous	玻璃樽	Thief at airport	
1999	Metade Fumaca	半支煙	Third Sister	
1999	The Tricky Master	千王之王2000	Wasabi	
1999	My Loving Trouble 7	我愛777	Sandra	

=== 2000s ===
Year	English title	Original title	Role	Notes
2000	Jiang hu: The Triad Zone	江湖告急	Sophie	
2000	Born to Be King	勝者為王	Sister 13	
2000	Those Were the Days	友情歲月山雞故事	Sister 13	
2000	Juliet in Love	朱麗葉與梁山伯	Judy Chu	
2000	The Iron Ladies	สตรีเหล็ก		Cantonese dub
2001	Dance of a Dream	愛君如夢	Kam	
2001	My Life as McDull	麥兜故事	Mrs. McDull	Voice
2001	City of Desire	慾望之城	Sandra Lei	
2001	Martial Angels	絕色神偷	Monkey	
2002	Golden Chicken	金雞	Kam	
2002	Scooby-Doo	—N/a		Cantonese dub
2003	Golden Chicken 2	金雞2	Kam	
2003	Men Suddenly in Black	大丈夫	Ninth uncle's wife	
2003	Good Times, Bed Times	戀上你的床	Bobo Au	
2003	1:99 Shorts	1:99 電影行動		Television film
2003	The Iron Ladies 2	สตรีเหล็ก2		Cantonese dub
2003	Spy Kids 3-D: Game Over	—N/a		Cantonese dub
2004	Kung Fu Soccer	功夫足球	Big Sun	Television series
2004	McDull, Prince de la Bun	麥兜，菠蘿油王子	Mrs. Mc	Voice
2004	Super Model	我要做Model	Interviewee	
2004	Scooby-Doo 2: Monsters Unleashed	—N/a		Cantonese dub
2005	Perhaps Love	如果‧愛	Lin's Manager	
2005	Dragon Blade	龍刀奇緣	Bali-ba	Voice
2006	Men Suddenly in Black 2	大丈夫2	Ninth Aunt	
2006	McDull, the Alumni	春田花花同學會	Waitress	
2006	The Matchmaker	天下第一媒婆	Song Shuangshuang	Television series
2006	Metrosexual	แก๊งชะนีกับอีแอบ		Cantonese dub
2007	I Love Sister Furong	我愛芙蓉姐		Television series
2007	Simply Actors	戲王之王	Phone accessory vendor	
2009	Echoes of the Rainbow	歲月神偷	Mrs. Law	
2009	On His Majesty's Secret Service	大內密探零零狗	Empress	
2009	McDull, Kung Fu Kindergarten	麥兜響噹噹	Mrs. McDull	Voice
2009	All's Well, Ends Well 2009	家有喜事2009	Chu Yu	

=== 2010s ===
Year	English title	Original title	Role	Notes
2010	All About Love	得閑炒飯	Macy	
2010	Beauty on Duty!	美麗密令	Iron Mary	
2010	Just Another Pandora's Box	越光寶盒	Wu's Chef	
2010	All's Well, Ends Well 2010	花田囍事2010	Sweetie	
2010	Echoes of the Rainbow	歲月神偷	Mrs. Law	
2011	Mr. and Mrs. Incredible	神奇俠侶	Aroma Woman	
2011	I Love Hong Kong	我愛HK開心萬歲	Mrs Ng Sun	
2012	Ripples of Desire	花漾	Madame Moon	
2012	McDull: The Pork of Music	麥兜噹噹伴我心	Mrs. McDull	Voice
2012	Marrying Mr. Perfect	嫁個100分男人	Winnie's sister-in-law	
2012	All's Well, Ends Well 2012	八星報喜	Chelsia	
2013	Princess and the Seven Kung Fu Masters	笑功震武林	Madonna	
2013	Hotel Deluxe	百星酒店	Peach Tin	
2013	Better and Better	越來越好之村晚	Yuan Fang	
2014	Revelation of Ghost Marriage	冥婚啟示 / 非常婚事	Mrs. Wu	Also known as A Fantastic Ghost Wedding
2014	McDull: Me & My Mum	麥兜●我和我媽媽	Mrs. McDull	Voice
2014	Naked Ambition 2	豪情2	Kam	Cameo
2014	Golden Chicken 3	金雞SSS	Kam	Also as producer
2014	Hello Babies	六福喜事	Gong San	
2015	Accidental Hero	偶然英雄		
2015	Jian Bing Man	煎餅俠	Herself	
2015	Monster Hunt	捉妖記	Ying	
2015	Lost and Love	失孤	Human trafficker	Cameo
2015	12 Golden Ducks	12金鴨	Future Cheung	Also as producer
2017	Goldbuster	妖鈴鈴	Ling	Also as director
2017	Meow	喵星人	Chow Lai-chu	Cantonese dub
2018	Monster Hunt 2	捉妖記2	Ying	
2018	The Faces of My Gene	祖宗十九代	Nüwa	
2018	Agent Mr Chan	棟篤特工		
2019	On Your Mom, Get Set, Go!	媽媽的神奇小子		
2019	Enter the Fat Dragon	肥龍過江		

=== 2020s ===
Year	English title	Original title	Role	Notes
2021	Zero to Hero	媽媽的神奇小子	So's mother	
2022	Chilli Laugh Story	闔家辣	Wendy	Also producer of the film
2024	Love Lies	我談的那場戀愛	Veronica Yu	

=== Hosting ===
English title	Original title	Network
Enjoy Yourself Tonight	歡樂今宵	TVB Jade
Club Sparkle	星星同學會	TVB Jade

=== Music video appearances ===
Year	Song title	Artist
1984	"Gao Wen Jing Jie 高溫境界"	Ken Choi
1986	"Red Mobile 紅色跑車"	Tai Chi
2019	"Hubby"	Jolin Tsai

== Discography ==
=== Studio albums ===
Title	Label	Released	Track listing
裝傻	BMG Taiwan	1992	Track listing: 1. 新年快樂; 2. 愛你一生還不夠（鄭伊健/吳君如）; 3. 多得你放棄; 4. 不可輕看; 5. 愛神不許再裝傻; 6. 我是路邊一支草; 7. 只有你的愛能到永遠; 8. 心痛怎麼說清楚; 9. 巴老彈星人報佳音（特別混音版）; 10. 新年快樂（卡拉OK版）
我有我的溫柔	BMG Hong Kong	1993	Track listing: 1. 多得你放棄; 2. 不清不楚; 3. 誰會一生愛護任性的我; 4. 她怎麼了; 5. 恭喜發財利是來; 6. 求可再度跟你一起; 7. 別再禁制我; 8. 只因你心醉（鄭伊健/吳君如）; 9. 我是路邊一支草; 10. 不可輕看
君如處處吻	PolyGram Hong Kong	1995	Track listing: 1. 如樂園; 2. 年中無憂; 3. Happy Birthday 送我給你; 4. 起過風; 5. 認真玩結婚; 6. 回憶是溫柔的; 7. 初一十五（吳君如/黃偉文）; 8. 祝你好運; 9. 識做識玩; 10. 情人處處吻; 11. 娛樂完

=== Extended plays ===
Title	Label	Released	Track listing
Sandra	BMG Hong Kong	1992	Track listing: 1. 巴老彈星人報佳音; 2. 只因你心醉（鄭伊健/吳君如）; 3. 誰會一生愛護任性的我; 4. 巴老彈星人報佳音（特別混音版）; 5. 只因你心醉（卡拉OK版）; 6. 巴老彈星人報佳音（卡拉OK版）

=== Singles ===
Title	Label	Released	Track listing
"廢話"	BMG Hong Kong	7 September 1993	Track listing: 1. 廢話; 2. 不清不楚（Unclear Mix）; 3. 廢話（Nonsense Mix）

== Awards and nominations ==
Year	Award	Category	Work	Result	Ref.
1989	8th Hong Kong Film Awards	Best New Performer	The Inspector Wears Skirts	Nominated	
1995	14th Hong Kong Film Awards	Best Supporting Actress	The Returning	Nominated	
1996	33rd Golden Horse Awards	Best Leading Actress	4 Faces of Eve	Nominated	
1997	16th Hong Kong Film Awards	Best Actress	4 Faces of Eve	Nominated	
1998	35th Golden Horse Awards	Best Leading Actress	Portland Street Blues	Nominated	
1999	18th Hong Kong Film Awards	Best Actress	Portland Street Blues	Won	
1999	Hong Kong Film Critics Society Awards	Best Actress	Portland Street Blues	Won	
1999	Golden Bauhinia Awards	Best Actress	Portland Street Blues	Won	
2003	22nd Hong Kong Film Awards	Best Actress	Golden Chicken	Nominated	
2003	40th Golden Horse Awards	Best Leading Actress	Golden Chicken	Won	
2003	Golden Bauhinia Awards	Best Actress	Golden Chicken	Nominated	
2004	23rd Hong Kong Film Awards	Best Actress	Golden Chicken 2	Nominated	
2004	Golden Bauhinia Awards	Best Actress	Golden Chicken 2	Nominated	
2004	Chinese Film Media Awards	Most Popular Actress (Bronze)	—N/a	Won	
2009	2009 TVB Anniversary Awards	Best Presenter for a Television Programme	Club Sparkle	Nominated	
2010	29th Hong Kong Film Awards	Best Actress	Echoes of the Rainbow	Nominated	
2010	Changchun Film Festival	Best Supporting Actress	Echoes of the Rainbow	Won	
2010	Huabiao Awards	Outstanding Hong Kong Actress	Echoes of the Rainbow	Won	
2011	Huading Awards	Best Actress in a Motion Picture	Echoes of the Rainbow	Nominated	
2012	31st Hundred Flowers Awards	Best Actress	Echoes of the Rainbow	Nominated	
2014	13th New York Asian Film Festival	Star Asia Award	—N/a	Honored	
2015	34th Hong Kong Film Awards	Best Actress	Golden Chicken 3	Nominated	
2022	40th Hong Kong Film Awards	Best Actress	Zero to Hero	Nominated	
2024	61st Golden Horse Awards	Best Leading Actress	Love Lies	Nominated	
2024	44th Hawai'i International Film Festival	Spotlight On Hong Kong Filmmaker in Profile Award	—N/a	Honored	
2024	9th London East Asia Film Festival	Honorary Award	—N/a	Honored	
