= McDull =

Anthropomorphic pig cartoon character

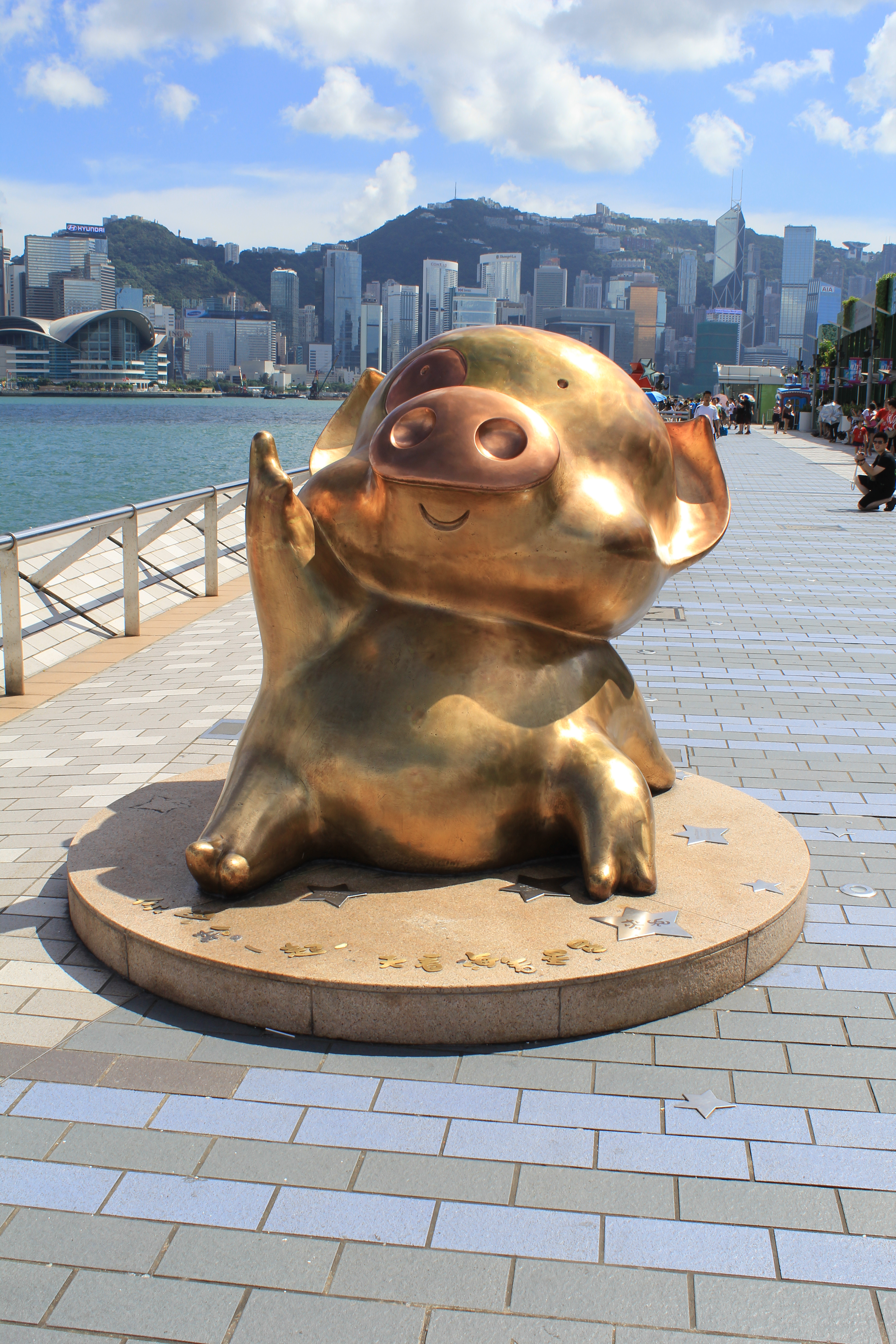
- McDull statue on the Avenue of Stars, Hong Kong
- Created by: Alice Mak; Brian Tse
- Characters: McMug; Mak Tam Yuk Lin; Excreman

McDull
- Traditional Chinese: 麥兜
- Simplified Chinese: 麦兜
- Cantonese Yale: Mahk Dāu
Transcriptions
Standard Mandarin
- Hanyu Pinyin: Mài Dōu
- Wade–Giles: Mai^{4} Tou^{1}
- IPA: [mâɪ tóʊ]
Yue: Cantonese
- Yale Romanization: Mahk Dāu
- Jyutping: mak6 dau1
- IPA: [mɐk̚˨ tɐw˥]

McDull (Chinese: 麥兜; Jyutping: mak6 dau1) is an anthropomorphic pig cartoon character created by Hong Kong cartoonists Alice Mak and Brian Tse. Although McDull first made his appearance as a supporting character in the McMug comics strips, he has since become a central character in his own right. McDull has featured in several comics, TV shows, and films, and has become extremely popular in Hong Kong and East Asia.

== McDull's background ==
McDull is a male pig distinguished by a birthmark on his right eye. He is characterized by his perseverance in pursuing his ambitions despite repeated setbacks, and his willingness to explore alternative goals. His persistence and refusal to give up have contributed to his popularity as a character.

The name McDull actually has a story itself. When Mrs. Mak was going to give birth to McDull, she saw a magical plastic basin (兜 pronounced roughly as "dull" in Cantonese) flying over her head. Believing it was a sign from the gods, she named her son "Dull". In Kung Fu Ding ding dong, it is explained why McDull is not smart. When McDull was still a baby, Ms. Mak sent him to a test on the Mozart effect. Sadly, he was put in the control group and listened to what was described as "nonsense songs" instead of Mozart.

McDull's personal information is as follows:

- Date of Birth: 22 June 1995
- Place of birth: Kwong Wah Hospital, Kowloon, Hong Kong
- Sex: Male
- Kindergarten: Chuntian Huahua Kindergarten
- Dream: To be an Olympic windsurfing champion; to travel to the Maldives
- Personality: Pure, straightforward, open-minded
- Favourite food: Chicken
- Most hated food: Vegetables
- Raised pet: Goldfish named Umbanana
- Mother: Mrs Mak Tam Yuk Lin 麥譚玉蓮 (麥太)
- Father: Mak Bing 麥炳
- Paternal older cousin: McMug 麥嘜

== Family of McDull ==
His mother's name is Mrs. Mak Tam Yuk Lin (麥譚玉蓮) and his father's is Mak Bing (麥炳). Before the birth of McDull, his father disappeared and therefore Mrs. Mak had to raise McDull as a single mother. Despite their mutual love, mother and son had many conflicts. Mrs. Mak is a typical Hong Kong mother, expecting her son to get good grades, to enter the University of Hong Kong, and to become a respected professional. McDull tries very hard to fulfill his mother's wishes, but always fails.

Earlier stories suggested that McMug is a distant (probably paternal) cousin of McDull.

== Excreman ==
Excreman is a human-shaped faex produced by McDull, debuting in an eponymous story featuring the character. This story was very loosely based on the book The Snowman by Raymond Briggs. The character Excreman is also similar to South Park's Mr. Hankey, another cartoon excrement character associated with Christmas.

One Christmas day, McDull produced a load of human-shaped dung called Excreman (屎撈人 jyutping: "si2 lou1 jan4"). After giving Excreman a scarf (made out of toilet paper) and a hat (actually a spittoon), he was brought by Excreman to dung-world. There, Excreman shares his wish with him: to become fertilizer for flowers.

When the next morning came, Excreman brought McDull back to his room and went to fulfill his goal. Before leaving, Excreman left a message to McDull: Remember us whenever you see the humblest, the deserted and the despised.

== McDull in the media ==
=== Comics ===
McDull first appeared as a comic book character. Most of the books mainly depicted his daily life:

- Yellow Bus Magazine
- McDull's Touching Short Stories (麥兜感人至深小故事)
- McDull – From Honey to BBQ Pork (麥兜從蜜汁到叉燒)
- McDull's Stories (麥兜故事)
- McDull's 'Tiny' Novels (麥兜. 微小小說)
- McDull's Hundred Thousands Questions Collection (麥兜十萬個為什麼)
- McDull's 'Dam' 'Dam' Noodles (麥兜的擔擔麵)
- McDull's Fishball (麥兜的魚蛋)
- McDull's Stitching – A Day of McDull (麥嘜縫縫縫——麥兜的一天)
- Dear McDull (麥肉兜兜)
- Mrs. Mac's Stories (麥太兜兜)
- Unplugged Version of Young McDull's Troubles (少年麥兜的煩惱Unplugged版(非賣品))

=== Films ===
My Life as McDull (2001)

The first McDull movie documented his life and the relationship between him and his mother.

As in the comics, McDull is a piglet who lives with his mother, Mrs. Mak, in Hong Kong. He is a kindergarten student. He has a happy school life with his classmates including geese, tortoises and other pigs. McDull and his mum love each other very much. McDull tries his best to make his mother proud of him and his mother tries hard to give McDull a happy childhood.

McDull wanted to go to the Maldives. His mother could not afford a trip there but she tricks him by taking him to The Peak by tram. The tram has a sign "Go to the Maldives". It made McDull very happy as he thought that he was really going to the Maldives.

After realizing his dream, McDull set himself another target: to become an Olympic champion just like female windsurfer Lee Lai Shan.

The McMug Story My Life as McDull is also being translated into French and shown in France. In this version, Mak Bing is the father of McDull, not his father.

McDull, Prince de la Bun (2004)

The sequel, whose Chinese title was: 麥兜菠蘿油王子 (lit. McDull, the prince of the pineapple bun with butter), was shown in cinemas in Hong Kong. There was again significant word play in this movie, some of it is based on the "pineapple bun". For example, in slang Cantonese, a 菠蘿蓋 ("bo1lo4 goi3", "pineapple cap") is colloquial for kneecap. The movie's theme, by the Pancakes, was named Best Original Film Song at the 24th Hong Kong Film Awards.

McDull, The Alumni (2006)
McDull, Kung Fu Kindergarten (2009)
McDull, The Pork of Music (2012)

McDull, The Pork of Music (traditional Chinese title: 麥兜噹噹伴我心) was first shown on 10 July 2012 in mainland China, and on 16 Aug 2012 in Hong Kong. Directed by Brian Tse, this movie elaborated on the musical education in McDull's Kindergarten.

The principal of the kindergarten contributed all his efforts to teaching music to kids. However, the kindergarten was under continuous financial crisis and was facing the threat to be shut down. Therefore, the principal decided to run a fund-raising dinner and invited the alumni of the kindergarten to donate. The dinner, however, turned out to be a failure because the alumni weren't able to donate much money.

Later, the principal found an agent to publicize the choir of the kindergarten and help them earn performing opportunities. After attending several performances, including one in the concert of Andy Lau, the agent took away all the money the choir earned and ran away.

The kindergarten shut down eventually, but the musical education the alumni received had a profound influence on them.

This cartoon was noted by its music, which incorporated classical music and modern elements.

McDull: Me & My Mum 麥兜．我和我媽媽 (2014)

McDull: Rise of the Rice Cooker 麥兜．飯寶奇兵 (2016)

=== Soundtrack ===
Screenshot from the karaoke DVD

In 2002, the soundtrack of My Life as McDull was released. It was produced by Steve Ho (何崇志), a Hong Kong musician who won Best Original Film Score at the 21st Hong Kong Film Awards. His blend of classical music and "modern" themes in this soundtrack led to a surge of interest in classical music amongst Hong Kong moviegoers.

Notably, McDull's theme song is Moments Musicaux No. 3 in F minor by Franz Schubert set with Cantonese lyrics.

The songs in the movie are also available in a karaoke DVD format.

=== Television ===
McDull and Chinese Culture (2006)

McDull and his fellow nursery pupils featured in five animated RTHK educational episodes running from April 2006 to May 2006. In keeping with the surreal humour of the McDull franchise, the series used humour to make Chinese history and culture accessible. In keeping with RTHK's public service broadcasting remit these episodes (as of July 2007) remain partially available to watch from its website.

The episodes follow the same basic format with McDull and friends being lectured by their headmaster about Chinese culture, before being interrupted by one pupil or the other. The narrator would then answer the pupil's questions with examples from the life of McDull's ancestor Mc Zi (麥子, literally wheat, a character sharing the name with 墨子 Mozi, the founder of Mohist order). This is followed by a short history lesson from McDull's teacher Miss Chan, often featuring a Chinese festival. The episode than finishes with the evolution of a Chinese character.

==== Episodes ====
- Episode 1: Hygiene and health. Qingming Festival (a much older McDull is seen at the grave of his mother and grand mother)
- Episode 2: Building and construction. Mid-Autumn Festival (the older McDull is seen thinking of his heimat from what looks like the Brooklyn Bridge)
- Episode 3: Food and Agriculture. Ghost Festival
- Episode 4: Chinese martial arts, medicine, alchemy.
- Episode 5: People and what it is to be a modern Chinese child.
