= 3 Days of a Blind Girl =

1993 Hong Kong film by Chan Wing-Chiu

- Directed by: Chan Wing-Chiu
- Written by: So Man-Sing
- Produced by: Alfred Cheung
- Starring: Veronica Yip; Anthony Wong; Jamie Luk Kin-ming; Anthony Chan; Alfred Cheung; Fruit Chan; Chan Yuet-Yue
- Production companies: Mobile Film Productions; Master Strength
- Distributed by: Golden Harvest Pictures Ltd. Media Asia Group
- Release date: 27 May 1993 (Hong Kong)
- Running time: 92 minutes
- Country: Hong Kong
- Language: Cantonese
- Box office: HK$2,934,838 (Hong Kong)

3 Days of a Blind Girl (Chinese: 盲女72小時, alias: Retribution Sight Unseen) also known as Maang lui 72 siu si (1993) is a 1993 Hong Kong psychological thriller film directed by Chan Wing-Chiu and starring Veronica Yip, Anthony Wong, Jamie Luk Kin-ming, Anthony Chan, Alfred Cheung, Fruit Chan, Chan Yuet-Yue. This film is quite possibly the Hong Kong version of Wait Until Dark.

== Plot ==
A heart specialist's young wife is left temporarily blind after an operation and will recover in around three days. As her husband departs for a doctor's convention in Macau he leaves her in the care of their maid. A strange man ingratiates himself into the household in order to avenge the seduction and death of his wife.

== Cast and roles ==
- Veronica Yip – Mrs. Jack Ng
- Anthony Wong – Sam Chu
- Anthony Chan – Dr. Jack Ng
- Alfred Cheung – Dr. Wong
- Fruit Chan – Burglar
- Jaime Luk Kin-ming – Cop
- Chan Yuet-Yue – May
- Chan Wing-Chiu – Pedestrian fighting over taxi with Mrs. Jack Ng

== Box office ==
The film grossed HK$2,934,838 at the Hong Kong box office during its theatrical run from 27 May to 2 June 1993 in Hong Kong.

== Home media ==
This film was released on Blu-ray on 13 November 2020.
