= The Deadly Camp =

1999 Hong Kong film by Bowie Lau

- DVD released by Wide Sight Entertainment
- Shan gou 1999
- Directed by: Bowie Lau
- Written by: Bowie Lau; Kenneth Hau Wai Lai
- Produced by: Lee Siu-kei
- Starring: Keung-Kuen Lai; Winnie Leung; Samuel Leung; Tsz Sin Lam; Anthony Wong
- Cinematography: Andy Kwong
- Edited by: Marco Mak
- Music by: Tommy Wai
- Production company: Wong Jing's Workshop Ltd.
- Release date: 31 October 1999 (Hong Kong)
- Running time: 81 minutes
- Country: Hong Kong
- Language: Cantonese

The Deadly Camp (Shan gou 1999) is a 1999 slasher film written and directed by Bowie Lau, and co-written by Kenneth Hau Wai Lai.

== Plot ==
On a secluded island, Hwa and his girlfriend are killed by a chainsaw-wielding man covered in bandages. Later, three couples (Professor and Linda, Ken and Winnie, and Soldier and Be Be) travel to the same location by boat, planning on camping out on the island for three days. To ensure they are not disturbed, Soldier collects everyone's cell phones and hides them, though as he leaves the hiding spot someone takes the phones. That night, the sextet run into a group of four led by Boar, who claims to be a prophylactic salesman (in actually, he and his associates are smugglers looking for Hwa). Boar's henchmen, Pervert and Blowie, wander off to urinate, and accidentally pee on and set fire to a deformed boy they encounter. Pervert and Blowie run off, and the boy returns home, where he is tended to by his father, the bandaged man.

In the afternoon of the next day, Pervert is captured by the boy and his father, who dismember him with a chainsaw. Blowie tells Boar that he thinks something has happened to Pervert, but is ignored. While Pervert goes to hang out with the couples, Boar and his wife Mi Mi are captured by the bandaged man, who takes them to his home. In attempt to barter for his freedom, Boar tries to teach the man's son how to "screw" Mi Mi, but she enrages the man into killing her when she knocks the boy away. Boar escapes the house, but triggers a tripwire on his way out, and is impaled by punji sticks.

While going to wash dishes, Linda and Be Be find Boar's body, and the latter is captured by the bandaged man. After Linda tells the others what happened, Soldier goes off to find Be Be, eventually stumbling onto the killer's lair, where he is killed with his own knife. The next to die is Blowie, who goes off alone to find a cell phone he and Pervert had earlier lost. The killer gives chase to the other campers, but loses them, so he returns home, and decapitates Be Be when she rejects his son's advances.

When a fight breaks out between the remaining campers, they become separated, and Winnie and Linda are captured. Professor and Ken find the killer's home by following his oblivious son, and rescue the girls by taking the son hostage. As the group is escaping, Professor triggers the reset punji sticks, and he and the son are killed by them. The next day, Ken and the two girls lure the killer into a trap they have set, a snare which swings him into tent spikes embedded in a tree. As the trio celebrate their victory, the killer's previously unseen wife appears, and slices Linda's neck open with her husband's dropped chainsaw. The wife chases Ken to a cliff, which he knocks her off of.

With every member of the deranged family apparently dead, Ken and Winnie go back to their campsite, just as their boat arrives. After Ken and Winnie board the boat, the wife's hand shoots out of the water, and grabs the side of it.

== Cast ==
- Anthony Wong as Boar
- Keung-Kuen Lai as Ken
- Winnie Leung as Winnie
- Samuel Leung as Blowie
- Tsz Sin Lam as Professor
- Yeung Fan as Mi Mi
- Chat Pui-Wan as Be Be
- Nam Wing Chan as Pervert
- Andy Tsang Tak-Wah as Retarded Guy
- Ling Ling Chui as Linda
- Tam Kon-Chung as Hwa
- Koo-Ling Chung as Soldier
- Mak Siu-Wah as Retarded Guy's Father
- Lin Koon-Hung as Retarded Guy's Mother

== Reception ==
Beyond Hollywood wrote that The Deadly Camp was an enjoyable film with interesting villains, amusing characters and a plot that, while generic and clichéd, was refreshingly lacking in the pretension found in most post-Scream slasher films. A score of three out of five was given by Hysteria Lives!, which said that while the film may have had a clichéd plot, it was still "a lot of dumb fun" with a formidable antagonist, nice cinematography, fast and frenetic action, and some genuinely tense moments.

Monster Hunter criticized the film for its weak story, lack of characterization, disappointing bloodshed and bad actors, writing that "Other than the fact that this is a product of Hong Kong, The Deadly Camp is a fairly typical slasher movie, and while not the worst one you've ever seen, it's nowhere near what you'd call good." So Good Reviews also responded negatively to the film, deadpanning that it had "crappy actors performing crappy characters under crappy direction" and extremely poor gore effects. Another critical review was given by Soiled Sinema, which said The Deadly Camp "doesn't demonstrate aptness in any category" and suffered from annoying characters and a nonsensical plot.
