= McDull: The Pork of Music =

2012 Hong Kong film by Brian Tse

- Theatrical release poster
- Traditional Chinese: 麥兜 · 噹噹伴我心
- Simplified Chinese: 麦兜 · 当当伴我心
- Hanyu Pinyin: màidōu· dāng dāng bàn wǒ xīn
- Directed by: Brian Tse
- Screenplay by: Brian Tse; Alice Mak
- Story by: Brian Tse
- Produced by: Yu Jie; Samuel Choy; He Zhikai
- Edited by: Wai Nap Wong
- Music by: Ng Cheuk-yin
- Production companies: Shanghai Toonmax Media; Sunwah Media; Well Talent Hong Kong
- Distributed by: Eastern Mordor; Pearl River Film Media; Shanghai Toonmax Media; Sunwah Media
- Release date: 10 July 2012
- Running time: 79 minutes
- Countries: China; Hong Kong
- Languages: Mandarin; Cantonese
- Box office: ¥49.2 million (China)

McDull: The Pork of Music is a 2012 Hong Kong animated comedy film written and directed by Brian Tse. It was officially released in cinemas on 10 July 2012, in China.

== Cast ==
- Liu Hau Yeut
- Chan Yik Yi
- Man To Pok
- Wong Ka Wai
- Sin Lok Yi
- Lily Zhang

== Reception ==
The film earned ¥49.2 million at the Chinese box office.

== See also ==
- McDull
- Hong Kong films of 2012
