= The Pancakes =

Hong Kong band

- Born: Hong Kong
- Occupations: Singer-songwriter, musician
- Years active: fl. ca. 2000–2016
- Spouse: Roy Tsui Ka-ho (m.2010)
- Awards: Hong Kong Film Awards – Best Original Film Song (24th)
- Musical career
- Origin: Hong Kong
- Genres: Twee pop, Hong Kong English pop, Cantopop
- Instruments: Vocal, Guitar, Melodica, Keyboard
- Labels: Rewind Records; Elefant Records (2001)
- Members: Dejay
- Website: thepancakes.com

The Pancakes is a Hong Kong–based one-girl band consisting of independent singer-songwriter Dejay Choi. The music of The Pancakes is characterised by her very innocent, almost childlike voice with bright and catchy melodies. Most of the Pancakes' songs have English lyrics, unlike the majority of Hong Kong pop music, where Cantonese is the norm.

== History ==
Dejay Choi, the sole member of the band, graduated from the University of Hong Kong, and Lee Hysan Hall (Old Hall), majoring in translation and German. She worked in the library of the Goethe-Institut Hong Kong (the German cultural centre in Hong Kong) prior taking up the profession as a singer-songwriter. Choi participated in several independent bands before founding the Pancakes, such as the Postcard (in 1996, a three-member band), Ginger Biscuits (in 1997, a solo act) and Tricycle Rider (in 1999, also with three members).

Her real Chinese name is unknown to the public, although appears as 蔡明麗 (coi3 ming4 lai6 in Jyutping) on her 2011 Cantonese album 腦殘遊記.

Choi handles almost everything by herself in the production of her albums, from musical composition, lyrics writing, instruments performance, singing, recording to production, etc. Dejay plays the guitar and keyboard. Furthermore, Dejay has also founded her own record label, Rewind Records, which handles the management and promotion for the Pancakes.

Her song, gum gum gum (Chinese: 咁咁咁, literally "like this, like this, like this"), written for the film McDull, Prince de la Bun won "Best Original Film Song" at the 24th Hong Kong Film Awards.

== Discography ==
Albums

- Les Bonbons Sont Bons (January 2000).
- Pancakes can panick (August 2000).
- All already ready (May 2002).
- Stereo Radio/ Left (February 2003).
- Stereo Radio/ Right (August 2003).
- Everyone has a Secret (September 2005).
- 1,2,3,4,5,6, cheese! (October 2007).
- Sometimes I just can't remember all the things we did together (June 2010).
- 腦殘遊記 (July 2011).
- sometimes when we cry (December 2013).

Single

- Demo Demo No.1 (March 2000)

Collaborated album

- ok karaoke (with alok July 2001)
- freeplay (with Chet Lam and ketchup (March 2004)

Album released under Elefant Records

- Captain Curtain (March 2001)
- Flying in the blue sky on a frying pan (November 2001)

== Composition for advertisements ==
Hong Kong

- Kowloon Motor Bus, July 2000, a (from the album les bonbons sont bons)
- HSBC Hong Kong credit card, December 2000, patronage (from the album pancakes can panick).
- San Miguel Beer Division, April 2001, wala wala (from album les bonbons sont bons) and 11 unreleased songs.
- China Light and Power, July 2001, the pancakes and the music'.
- Qoo soft drink, August 2002, the Qoo song.
- Hong Kong Leisure and Cultural Services Department, July 2006, incidental music for public pools advertisement.
- Hong Kong Centre of Health Protection, 2014, in the tune of If You're Happy and You Know It to lyrics giving instructions to stay home if one were to feel sick.
- Hong Kong Arts Centre, theme song for the 14th Hong Kong Independent Short Film & Video Awards, September 2008, 大踏步 (from album 1,2,3,4,5,6, cheese!)
- Wah Sing Zihua Embrocation, 2011, 點點點，最啱係我 a song written specially for the advertisement in which telling one where to apply Zihua Embrocation and how (via drips).
- Nestle 笨Nana Ice Cream, 2012, the 笨Nana Song.
- Red Bull Soapbox Race Hong Kong, 2012, my super car.
- Nestle 笨Nana, 2013, 三兄弟.
- Nestle 笨Nana, 2014, 變身2姊妹.

Europe

- Kia Motors Motors, 2007, tell me the truth before one of us dies ( from the album stereo radio/right) were used on the advertisement "cee'd sporty wagon Spot".

== Filmography ==
| Year | Title | Role | Notes |
|---|---|---|---|
| 2001 | My life as McDull | Ms Chan (Voice) | |
| 2004 | McDull, Prince de la Bun | Ms Chan (Voice) | Writer and performer the song "Gum Gum Gum" |
| 2006 | McDull, the Alumni | Ms Chan (Voice) | |
| 2009 | Triumph in the Skies | —N/a | Composer |
| 2009 | McDull, Kung Fu Kindergarten | Ms Chan (Voice) | Writer, Lyricist and performer the song "McDull, Kungfu Ding Ding Dong" |
| 2012 | McDull: Pork of Music | Ms Chan (Voice) | |
| 2013 | On the Edge of A Floating City, We Sing | —N/a | Composer |
| 2014 | McDull: Me & My Mum | Ms Chan (Voice) | |

== Publication ==
- 班門弄戟 (Cantonese：Baan Mun Nung Gig; Pinyin: bān mén nòng jǐ), Chinese proses collection, published by Kubrick in July 2005. ISBN 988-97905-3-X

== See also ==
- Hong Kong English pop
