= McDull, the Alumni =

2006 Hong Kong animated film by Samson Chiu

McDull, the Alumni (春田花花同學會)
- Film poster
- Directed by: Samson Chiu
- Written by: Brian Tse
- Produced by: Peter Chan; Brian Tse; Jojo Hui
- Starring: Albert Au; Ronald Cheng; Kelly Chen; Gigi Leung; Anthony Wong
- Cinematography: Charlie Lam
- Edited by: Wenders Li
- Music by: Steve Ho Sung-Chi
- Production companies: Morgan & Chan Films
- Distributed by: Sil-Metropole Organisation
- Release date: 26 January 2006
- Running time: 92 minutes
- Country: Hong Kong
- Language: Cantonese

McDull, the Alumni (Chinese: 春田花花同學會; pinyin: chūn tián huā huā tóng xué hùi) is a 2006 Hong Kong live action/animated comedy film directed by Samson Chiu. It is the third film adaptation of the popular McDull comic book series, following My Life as McDull, and McDull, Prince de la Bun. The film features a large ensemble cast of many of Hong Kong's cinematic icons.

The third film in the series finds McDull and his friends satirically exploring different roles in society.

== Cast ==
- Albert Au
- Ronald Cheng
- Kelly Chen
- Gigi Leung
- Anthony Wong
- Eric Tsang
- Josie Ho
- Shawn Yue
- Daniel Wu
- Jan Lamb
- Francis Ng
- Nicholas Tse
- Jaycee Chan
- Miu Kiu-Wai
- Cheung Tat-Ming
- Alex Fong Lik-Sun
- Isabella Leong
- Miki Yeung
- Lai Yiu-Cheung
- Christopher Doyle
- Bibi Zhou
- Steven Cheung
- Theresa Fu
- Bolin Chen
- Jane Zhang
