= A-1 Headline =

2004 Hong Kong film by Gordon Chan

A1 Headline
- Film poster
- Directed by: Gordon Chan; Rico Chung
- Written by: Gordon Chan; Rico Chung
- Produced by: Gordon Chan; Fruit Chan; Jimmy Law; Stephen Lam
- Starring: Anthony Wong; Angelica Lee; Edison Chen; Tony Leung Ka-fai
- Cinematography: Nau Yee-shun; Andy Kwong
- Edited by: Cheung Ka-fai
- Music by: Johnny Njo
- Production companies: Go Film Distribution; Panorama Entertainment; Sil-Metropole Organisation; People's Productions
- Distributed by: Panorama Distributions
- Release date: 9 September 2004
- Running time: 95 minutes
- Country: Hong Kong
- Languages: Cantonese; English
- Box office: HK$2,516,697

A-1 (Chinese: A1頭條), known internationally as A-1 Headline, is a 2004 Hong Kong thriller film written and directed by Gordon Chan and Rico Chung and starring Anthony Wong, Angelica Lee, Edison Chen, with a special appearance by Tony Leung Ka-fai.

== Cast ==
- Anthony Wong as Lam Hei-fei
- Angelica Lee as Elaine Tse
- Edison Chen as Kevin
- Tony Leung Ka-fai as Chief Editor Terrence Tsang Tat-si (special starring)
- Eric Kot as Ma Chai
- Gordon Lam as Tong
- Joel Chan as Sean Cheung
- Dante Lam as Ken
