= Statue of McDull =

Statue in Hong Kong

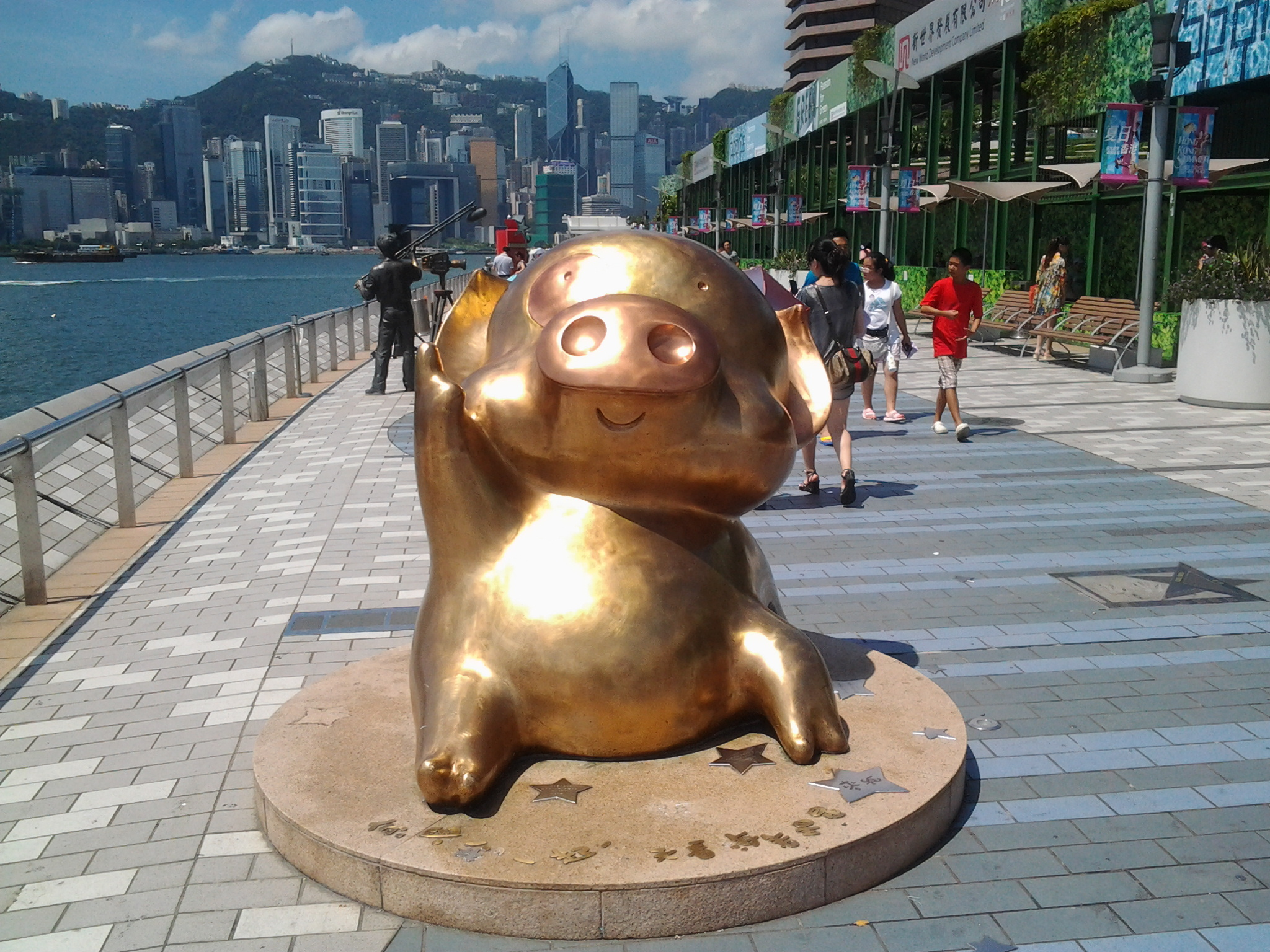
- The statue in 2013
- Subject: McDull
- Location: Hong Kong; 22.2931°N 114.1748°E

A bronze sculpture of McDull, an anthropomorphic pig cartoon character, was installed on Hong Kong's Avenue of Stars, along Tsim Sha Tsui's waterfront in Kowloon, in 2011. The statue has been relocated to the Tsim Sha Tsui East Waterfront Podium Garden temporarily, during an ongoing waterfront revitalisation project.
