= Hong Kong–Maldives relations =

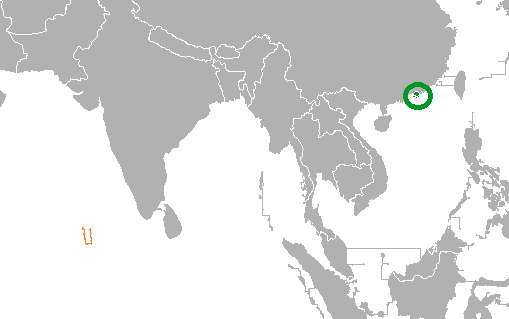
- Hong Kong: Maldives

Hong Kong–Maldives relations refer to foreign relations between Hong Kong and the Maldives.

== History ==
Historically, both sides had been colonies of the United Kingdom for a long period of time. Only until 1965, when Maldives gained independence from the United Kingdom, the situation changed. At that time, Hong Kong, still a colony of the United Kingdom, followed the British in diplomacy and immediately recognised the independence of Maldives as well as established relations with the nation.

== Modern relations ==
The Maldivian Honorary Consulate in Hong Kong in Kowloon is the official representation of the Maldives in Hong Kong.

Free trade agreements were negotiated between the two in 2016. The agreements between the two nations include several elements, such as (a) elimination or reduction of tariffs, (b) liberalisation of non-tariff barriers, (c) flexible disciplines on rules of origin which would facilitate bilateral trade, (d) customs facilitation procedures, (e) liberalisation as well as promotion and protection of investment; (f) liberalisation of trade in services, and (g) the legal and institutional arrangement and dispute settlement mechanism for the Free Trade Agreements.

Both coexist as independent member in many economic and cultural international organizations, for example, the World Trade Organization. The relations between the two have a focus on economic, social and cultural aspects because Hong Kong is restricted by Hong Kong Basic Law from concluding military agreements with foreign countries.
