= McMug =

Anthropomorphic pig cartoon character

- Traditional Chinese: 麥嘜
- Simplified Chinese: 麦唛
Transcriptions
Standard Mandarin
- Hanyu Pinyin: Màimài
Yue: Cantonese
- Jyutping: mak6 mak1

McMug (Chinese: 麥嘜) is an anthropomorphic pig cartoon character from Hong Kong featured in comic strips, TV shows, and films. McMug first appeared in 1988, as the central character of a comic strip printed in the Ming Pao weekly magazine. McMug is drawn by cartoonist Alice Mak (麥家碧), with stories written by Brian Tse (謝立文).

Although McMug comics have a somewhat childish style, they often address serious social issues, including death, poverty, and single-parent families, making it resonate with adult audiences as well as children. The plotlines are also known for covering local cultural festivals, and celebrities, reflecting the deep roots of Hong Kong culture.

McMug has become one of the most popular cartoon figures in Hong Kong, appearing in books, movies, TV programs, stationery, bedding and other merchandise. McMug's distant cousin, McDull, is also enjoying huge success.

== Fictional biography ==
=== Family ===
McMug, who grew up on Lantau Island, was adopted when he was only one month old. In a thundery night, all panicky pigs fled from the farm, and among them was McMug who was picked up by a couple who were on the island for a holiday.

McMug can speak. He calls his parents Papa and Mama. The couples were Robin Hood figures when they were young, named BugBug. They count Superman as well as Superwoman amongst their friends.

=== Friends ===
McMug has his school life in a kindergarten named Springfield Flowers Kindergarten (春田花花幼稚園). He has been studying in kindergarten for 8 years.

- Lisa, a wild boar, is McMug's penfriend.
- Darby, a tomcat, is his classmate.
- Goosie, a goose, is known for kindness.
- Fai, a tortoise, is loyal to friends.
- May is a cow.
- June is a female hippopotamus who always hangs out with May. They work out together.
- McDull, McMug's only pig friend, who is even sillier than McMug. Early stories suggested that McDull and McMug are distant cousins.
- Miss Chan, a human teacher.
- The Principal, a middle-age man who founded the Springfield Flowers Kindergarten and became its Principal. Incidentally, he also opened a noodle shop in McDull's story. According to one story, he founded the kindergarten in order to provide a teaching position for his wife, who was migrating to Hong Kong from the Mainland.

== Social impact ==
McMug is rare in that it is a comic dedicated to cover social issues and local contemporary culture.

== McMug Comic Books ==
- Fairy Tales for the Adults (麥嘜成人童話)
- The Flying Pig (麥嘜天空飛豬)
- The Dinosaur's Love Song (麥嘜恐龍戀曲)
- The Three Pigs (麥嘜三隻小豬)
- Gloves (麥嘜絨裡手套)
- The Youth Song (麥嘜青春舞曲)
- Bygones as Dreams (麥嘜舊歡如夢)
- McMug Poems' Collection (麥嘜詩畫選)
- McMug's Little Stories (麥嘜感人至深小故事)
- Sort-of Blue Sub-tropics (麥嘜算憂鬱亞熱帶)
- Micro-fiction (麥嘜微小小說)
- Springfield Flowers Kindergarten (春天花花幼稚園)
- McMug Chun Tin Fa Fa Stories (麥嘜春田花花)
- McMug Comic Strips (1) Stories (麥嘜格格漫畫 (1))
- McMug Comics Stories – Sampler (麥嘜漫畫 – Sampler)
- McMug's Collection of Games to be Played When Bored (麥嘜無聊才玩遊戲集)
- 春田花花幼稚園 マクダルとマクマグ(2006 Japan)

== McMug Songs ==
- 《月光光》
- 《 腳瓜大顫——中國人好腳法》
- 《一定得》
- 《麥兜與雞》
- 《黎根之歌》
- 《我個名叫麥兜兜》
- 《春田花花幼兒園主題歌》
- 《麥嘜唱ABC》
- 《大包整多兩籠》
- 《麥兜與豬腩肉》

== McMug products ==
In 2005, the Circle-K convenience store, together with Bliss (the company that owns the copyright to the McDull and McMug series), launched a marketing campaign named "McMug Spell-it-out" (Chinese: 麥嘜任你串; lit. 'Spell it out with McMug'). For any purchase in Circle-K exceeding HK$20, the customer gets a badge with a picture of McMug (or its friends) and a silly motto sheet. The complete set of these badges features the 26 English letters A–Z, plus additional "secret" designs featuring a heart (with Goosie), an exclamation mark (with Darby), a question mark (with Fai), and an ampersand (with May and June).
