= Alice Mak (cartoonist) =

Hong Kong comics artist

Alice Mak 麥家碧
- Area: Cartoonist
- Notable works: McDull and McMug

Alice Mak
- Traditional Chinese: 麥家碧
- Simplified Chinese: 麦家碧
Transcriptions
Standard Mandarin
- Hanyu Pinyin: Mài Jiābì
Yue: Cantonese
- Jyutping: mak6 gaa1 bik1

Alice Mak (Chinese: 麥家碧) is an artist and cartoonist. She is one of the two creators of the cartoon characters McMug and McDull.

The animated films My Life as McDull and McDull, Prince de la Bun have received numerous awards.

McDull, The Alumni, was released in early 2006.

== McMug comic books ==
- Fairy Tales for the Adults (麥嘜成人童話)
- The Flying Pig (麥嘜天空飛豬)
- The Dinosaur's Love Song (麥嘜恐龍戀曲)
- The Three Pigs (麥嘜三隻小豬)
- Gloves (麥嘜絨裡手套)
- The Youth Song (麥嘜青春舞曲)
- Bygones as Dreams (麥嘜舊歡如夢)
- McMug Poems' Collection (麥嘜詩畫選)
- McMug's Little Stories (麥嘜感人至深小故事)
- Sort-of Blue Sub-tropics (麥嘜算憂鬱亞熱帶)
- Micro-fiction (麥嘜微小小說)
- Springfield Flowers Kindergarten (春天花花幼稚園)
- McMug Chun Tin Fa Fa Stories (麥嘜春田花花)
- McMug Comic Strips (1) Stories (麥嘜格格漫畫 (1))
- McMug Comics Stories – Sampler (麥嘜漫畫 – Sampler)
- McMug's Collection of Games to be Played When Bored (麥嘜無聊才玩遊戲集)

== McMug songs ==
- "月光光"
- " 腳瓜大顫——中國人好腳法"
- "一定得"
- "麥兜與雞"
- "黎根之歌"

== McMug products ==
In 2005, the Circle K convenience store, together with Bliss (the company that owns the copyright to the McDull and McMug series), launched a marketing campaign named "McMug Spell-it-out" (Chinese: 麥嘜任你串; lit. 'Spell it out with McMug'). For any purchase in Circle-K exceeding HK$20, the customer gets a badge with a picture of McMug (or its friends) and a silly motto sheet. The complete set of these badges features the 26 English letters A–Z, plus additional "secret" designs featuring a heart (with Goosie), an exclamation mark (with Darby), a question mark (with Fai), and an ampersand (with May and June).

== See also ==
- Brian Tse (writer)
- McMug
- McDull
