= Brian Tse (writer) =

- Area: Writer
- Notable works: "McMug and McDull"

Brian Tse
- Traditional Chinese: 謝立文
- Simplified Chinese: 谢立文
Transcriptions
Standard Mandarin
- Hanyu Pinyin: Xiè Lìwén
Yue: Cantonese
- Jyutping: ze6 laap6 man4

Brian Tse (Chinese: 謝立文) is the author of the Hong Kong children comic, "McMug and McDull" series. He is one of the two creators (another is Alice Mak, his colleague-turned-wife) of the cartoon characters McMug and McDull. His wife is responsible for the illustration. His other works include "The Excreman (屎撈人) " (a "serious" parody of the famous English cartoon, "The Snowman"), "The Beautiful Loser", "Pig Has Come", and "Over the Rainbow".

== Childhood ==
Tse lived in a village in Sha Tin when he was small, and had a pet name, "Fook Chai", given by his neighbours. He was a lacklustre boy.His family had to move from one location to other, thus Tse had changed his primary schools four times. Tse liked watching movies at cinemas; in order to earn money for buying tickets, he helped his classmates finish their art assignments as an odd-job. He had his secondary school life at St. Stephen's College, Stanley, where he built up his confidence. Then, he migrated to Australia.While in Sydney, he became influenced by the cartooning style of Michael Leunig, a Melburnian who was (and remains to this day) one of the most popular and critically acclaimed cartoonists in Australia.

== Writing career ==
Tse had his early works published on "Ming Pao Weekly". He gained his inspiration from the picture books he read in Australia, of which Raymond Briggs had the greatest influence on his creative writing. Tse was famous for his so-called adult fairy tales joining songs, photos, and comics.Tse's favourite pastimes include reading, listening music

== See also ==
- Alice Mak
- McMug
- McDull
