= Hu Xia =

Chinese singer (born 1990)

Hu Xia（胡夏）
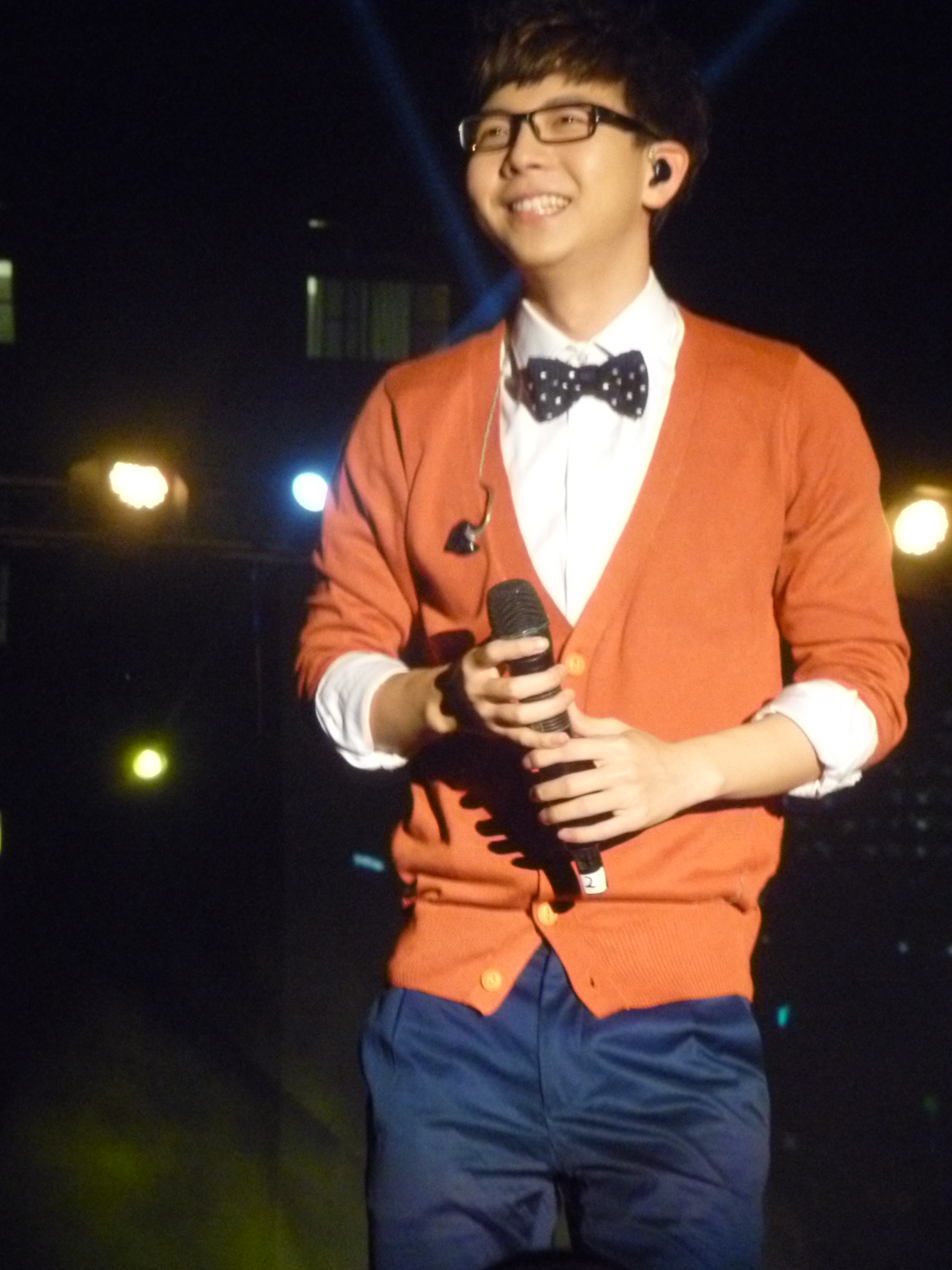
- Born: 1 March 1990 (age 36); Nanning, Guangxi, China
- Occupations: Singer, actor
- Years active: 2010–present
- Awards: Best New Artist at the 17th Singapore Hit Awards
- Musical career
- Origin: Nanning, Guangxi, China
- Genres: Mandopop
- Labels: Raining Culture (2018 - present); Sony Music Entertainment China (2010 - 2016)

Hu Xia (Chinese: 胡夏; English name: Fox Hu; born 1 March 1990) is a Chinese singer and actor. He won the sixth season of Taiwan's One Million Star in 2010 and released his debut album, Hu Love Xia, later that year. He has sung a great number of soundtracks for Chinese TV series, movies and games, the most famous ones being, "Those Years" (那些年), for You Are the Apple of My Eye in 2011 and "Don't You Know" (知否知否) for The Story of Minglan in 2018.

== Career ==
=== 2008 – 2010: Debut and Hu Love Xia ===
In 2008, Hu entered Mengniu Yogurt Music Dream Academy, titled "Running Towards Beijing, Achieving Music Dreams" and held by Enlight Pictures. He finished in the Top 8 and became a member of the idol group Fengyunbang (风云帮).

In September 2009, following the disbandment of Fengyunbang, Hu went to Taiwan to compete in the sixth season of One Million Star.

In May 2010, he signed with Sony Music Entertainment Taiwan as the winner of One Million Star. Hu was the first mainland China contestant to win a talent show in Hong Kong and Taiwan. On December 17, Hu Xia released his debut album Hu Love Xia (胡 爱夏). The title was taken from his father and mother’s family names, Hu and Xia, which is how he also got his name. The album earned him the award for Best New Artist at the 17th Singapore Hit Awards, the youngest and the first mainland China artist to win the award.

=== 2011 – 2013: "Those Years" and Flame of Love ===
In 2011, Hu sang the theme song, "Those Years" (那些年), for the Taiwanese movie You Are the Apple of My Eye. The song became a mega hit in Asia and the music video, uploaded to an unofficial channel, garnered more than 100 million views in YouTube and is one of the most-viewed Chinese music videos on that platform. The song was nominated for the Best Original Film Soundtrack award at the 48th Golden Horse Awards. Same year, he made his acting debut in the musical Young Music (乐动青春).

On February 24, 2012, Hu released his second album Flame of Love (燃点). On March 25, he held his first concert "Let Me Love You" in Taipei. In August, he held an unplugged concert in Nanning. In September, he starred in his first film Sad Fairy Tale, for which he also sang the theme song.

=== 2013 – 2017: Silly Tango and Love Odyssey ===
On June 20, 2013, Hu released his third album Silly Tango (傻瓜探戈). It topped the six major charts in China, Hong Kong and Taiwan (G-music, Chinese Music Chart, Asia Pacific Music Chart, QQ Music Popular Chart, China Mobile Migu New Song Chart and Newcomer Chart). In November, he sang the theme song "Letting Go" (放下) for the movie The Four 2.

In April 2014, Hu covered Lao Lang's "My Old Classmate" (同桌的你), which was the theme song for the film of the same name. In August, Hu released "Ruthless" (无情), the theme song for The Four Final Battle.

In 2015, Hu released his fourth album Love Odyssey (替我照顧她) on April 14. Same month, he also starred in the film The Left Ear and released the promotional song "A beautiful Yesterday" (美好的昨天) for the film. On August 15, he held "Suddenly Summer" (忽然一夏) concert at Beijing Century Theater and donated the proceeds to the victims of the 2015 Tianjin explosions.

In 2016, Hu chose not to renew his contract with Sony Music Taiwan and Enlight Pictures. From June to July, he participated in the Chinese and South Korean music show The Collaboration and teamed up with Zico.

In June 2017, Hu released "Rush to the Dead Summer" (夏至未至), the theme song for the same-name TV series adapted from Guo Jingming's novel.

=== 2018 – 2021: "Don't You Know?" and Reading the Old ===
In August 2018, Hu sang the first ending song, "Sighs of the Palace Walls" (红墙叹), for Story of Yanxi Palace. In November, Hu partnered with 2D content creation community CFun to create the comic "Young Detective" starring Hu's two-dimensional image IP "Hu Xiaoxia". In December, he performed "Don't You Know?" (知否知否) with Yisa Yu for the TV series The Story of Minglan. The song became a mega hit, topping Tencent Music's UNI Chart for 5 consecutive weeks, the QQ Music New Song Chart 16 times, the Kugou Music Chinese New Song Chart and the Rising Chart, and the Kuwo Music New Song Chart for a whole month.

On April 12, 2019, Hu participated in the season 7 finale of the singing competition show Singer as Chyi Yu's partner. On April 17, Hu released his fifth album Reading the Old (念·旧), under a new label Raining Culture (大雨文化).

In 2020, Hu appeared on Singer again, this time as a challenge singer. In July, he released "Indeterminate Fate" (未定的注定), the promotional song for the game Tears of Themis. In December, he sang "Red Supreme"(红绝), the ending theme for donghua Heaven Official's Blessing.

From December 2020 to February 2021, Hu participated in the competition show Shine! Super Brothers, finishing in 2nd place behind Tan Jianci and forming the group Tan, Chen Zhipeng, Fu Longfei, Fu Xinbo, Liu Wei, and Yu Menglong. In March 2021, he released "Untitled"(无题), which is one of the soundtracks for the TV series Word of Honor. From September to December 2021, Hu participated in the music variety show Singing with Legends season 3 as a New Singer and was paired with the Veteran Singer George Lam, winning the best pair prize of the season.

=== 2022 – Present: MORE Hu Xia and variety shows ===
In 2022, Hu performed "Red Sun" (紅日) at CCTV Mid-Autumn Festival Gala with Hacken Lee.

On February 17, 2023, Hu released his sixth album MORE Hu Xia (MORE胡夏). On November 18, Hu held the first stop of his "Those Bygone Years" concert tour ("那些年"巡回演唱会) at the Guangzhou Asian Games City Gymnasium.

In 2024, Hu participated in multiple reality and variety shows, including Fresh Singer Group (鲜活唱游团), season 4 of Call Me By Fire (披荆斩棘的哥哥), Enjoy Your Journey (乐在旅途), "Friends Sing Night" on season 6 of Singing with Legends (我们的歌), and Hit Songs 2024 (有歌2024).

== Discography ==
=== Albums ===
- 胡 爱夏 (Hu Love Xia) (December 17, 2010)
- 燃点 (Flame of Love) (February 24, 2012)
- 傻瓜探戈 (Silly Tango) (June 22, 2013)
- 替我照顧她 (Love Odyssey) (April 14, 2015)
- 念·旧 (Reading the Old) (April 17, 2019)
- MORE胡夏 (MORE Hu Xia) (February 17, 2023)

=== EP ===
- 三 (Three) (May 17, 2013)
- 拾 (Ten) (May 14, 2020)

=== Singles ===
Release date	English title	Original title	Note
2014/07/15	Between the Mountains	山水之间	Cover Xu Song, included in Xu Song's EP Between the Mountains
2015/07/10	Naked Summer	裸夏	
2016/06/05	So Suzhou	那么苏州	
2019/09/09	Huan Xi Sha - Shei Nian Xi Feng Du Zi Liang	浣溪沙·谁念西风独自凉	Based on the same-name ci poetry from Qing dynasty poet Nalan Xingde
2019/08/09	With You	与你	City promotional song for Liuzhou, Guangxi
2019/12/20	New song of seven sons	七子新歌	Xinhua News Agency memorial song for 20th Anniversary of Transfer of sovereignty over Macau
2020/01/02	Blueprints in Mind	心有蓝图	Theme song for CCTV Special Program for 20th Anniversary of Transfer of sovereignty over Macau
2020/01/18	Wish You Great Fortune	恭喜发财财	
2020/05/07	Migratory Bird	候鸟	Cover S.H.E, included in NetEase Cloud Music Remake of Youth Part 2
2020/05/30	Rewind	倒带	Cover Jolin Tsai, included in NetEase Cloud Music Remake of Youth Part 3
2020/06/26	Fly High! Youth	飞翔吧！少年	
2020/07/13	Feelings of Ice and Snow	冰雪情怀	Included in Musical Works for the Olympic and Paralympic Winter Games Beijing 2022, featuring Song Zu'er
2020/11/18	Wishes of Angels	天使的愿望	
2020/12/31	Song of Observing the World	观尘歌	Included in QQ Music and the Forbidden City collaborating album Forbidden City Imprint
2021/06/22	Ship Direction	船向	
2021/07/20	Flowers brightened by the galaxy (Farewell)	银河照亮的花	
2021/07/30	The Long Great Wall	长城长	Included in the tribute album for 100th Anniversary of the founding of Chinese Communist Party: One Hundred
2021/10/18	Chase	追寻	Included in the tribute album for 100th Anniversary of the founding of Chinese Communist Party: One Hundred
2021/12/01	China in Lights	灯火中的中国	Included in the tribute album for 100th Anniversary of the founding of Chinese Communist Party: One Hundred
2021/12/08	The promise of future	未来之约	Included in the tribute album for 100th Anniversary of the founding of Chinese Communist Party: One Hundred
2021/12/15	Love Me Forever	爱我久久	Cover Ah Niu, included in NetEase Cloud Music Remake of Youth Part 5
2022/01/11	Fireworks	花火	feat. After Journey
2022/04/22	Su Mu Zhe - Huai Jiu	苏慕遮·怀旧	Based on the same-name ci poetry from Northern Song poet Fan Zhongyan
2022/08/04	Good Times	良辰今昔	
2022/09/29	Chinese Waves Chinese People	中国潮中国人	Theme song for Henan TV Poetry Heart
2022/10/04	Borrow the Lights	借光	
2022/11/23	Falling Snow	落雪	

=== OST ===
Release date	English title	Original title	Note
2011/07/27	Those Years (Those Bygone Years)	那些年	Theme song for movie You are the Apple of My Eye
2012/09/14	Sad Fairy Tale	伤心童话	Theme song for movie Sad Fairy Tale
2013/11/07	Letting Go	放下	Theme song for movie The Four 2
2014/04/03	My Old Classmate	同桌的你	Theme song for movie My Old Classmate
2014/08/11	Ruthless	无情	Theme song for movie The Four Final Battle
2014/09/18	Where are You (Gone is Love)	你在哪里(又名爱走掉)	Insert song for TV series The Way We Were
2015/01/30	Another noise	另一个噪音	Promotional song for movie The Arti: the Adventure Begins
2015/08/07	Time to Love	爱你步步惊心	Theme song for movie Time to Love
2015/08/09	Happiness you gave me	给我的快乐	Theme song for TV series Hero Dog
2016/02/29	He is better than me	他比我更适合	Theme song for TV series The Love of Happiness
2016/07/28	If I can	如果可以	Insert song for TV series The Whirlwind Girl 2
2016/10/17	Waiting for the whole life	等一生	Ending theme for TV series Happy Mitan
2017/01/08	Hello, Cinderalla	你好灰姑娘	Ending theme for TV series Pretty Li Huizhen
2017/06/11	Rush to the Dead Summer	夏至未至	Opening theme for TV series Rush to the Dead Summer
2017/09/01	Last words of youth	青春遗言	Theme song for movie Growing Pains
2017/10/25	Spilled Water	覆水	Promotional song for TV series Oh My General
2018/05/07	Our love is never wrong (There is no mistake in our love)	我们的爱没有错	Opening theme for TV series Summer's Desire
2018/06/17	Intuition	直觉	Insert song for TV series My Story for You, cover Jeff Chang
2018/08/02	The Evolution Of Our Love	爱情进化论	Opening theme for TV seriesThe Evolution Of Our Love
2018/08/03	Sigh of Palace Walls (Red Wall Sigh)	红墙叹	Ending theme for TV series Story of Yanxi Palace (EP1~EP22)
2018/11/02	Courage	勇气	Ending theme for TV series Never Gone, cover Fish Leong
2018/11/09	Touched	打动	Insert song for TV series The Family
2018/12/03	Long Ages	悠悠岁月	Insert song for TV series Ever Night
2018/12/22	Don't you know	知否知否	Theme song for TV series The Story of Minglan, featuring Yisa Yu
2019/01/07	Are you willing?	只问你肯不肯	Conceptual song for TV series The Story of Minglan
2019/01/23	The bitterest sweet	最苦的甜	Ending theme for TV series The Last Goddess
2019/02/01	Will you love me	Will you love me	Theme song for TV series Unforgettable Impression
2019/02/27	What is enternity	何为永恒	Ending theme for TV series Heavenly Sword and Dragon Slaying Sabre
2019/04/28	Where am I from	我从哪里来	Chinese promotional song for movie Capernaum
2019/04/29	I Only Like You	我只喜欢你	Opening theme for TV series Le Coup de Foudre
2019/05/17	Youth Grand Slam	青春大满贯	Ending theme for TV series Prince of Tennis
2019/07/03	Change	改变	Insert song for River Flows to You
2019/07/24	If at that time	如果当时	Promotional song for movie Shanghai Fortress
2019/09/20	Lonely Island	孤岛	Insert song for TV series Airborne Blade
2019/09/27	Soaring In the Sky	翱翔天地	Insert song for movie The Captain
2019/10/25	Shui Mo	水墨	Opening theme for TV series When Shui Meets Mo
2019/10/29	A Fantastic Encounter	悠然见南山	Theme song for movie A Fantastic Encounter
2019/11/14	Falling Leaves	落叶	Opening theme for TV series Crocodile and Plover Bird
2019/11/19	Unstoppable Youth	青春抛物线	Opening theme for TV series Unstoppable Youth
2019/12/09	Tao Chan	逃禅	Theme song for game The Magic Blade
2019/12/31	Word of Jingxiu	锦绣令	Ending theme for TV series The Sweet Girl
2020/02/02	Light of the Heart	心光	Ending theme for TV series Find Yourself
2020/04/08	Wish Song	愿歌行	Opening theme for TV series Serenade of Peaceful Joy
2020/06/03	Where heart is heading	心之所向	Opening theme for TV series Hardcore Lovers
2020/06/15	Between the words	字里行间	Insert song for TV series The Eight
2020/07/09	Daybreak Dusk	晨昏	Opening theme for donghua Mr Love: Queen's Choice
2020/07/29	Indeterminate Fate	未定的注定	Promotional song for game Tears of Themis
2020/09/08	Fate starts from Jade Dynasty	缘起诛仙	Theme song for game Jade Dynasty
2020/10/15	Not Drunken, Never Forget	不醉不忘	Insert song for TV series The Moon Brightens For You
2020/10/16	Time Flies	来过	Chinese theme song for movie Dans la brume
2020/11/13	Way Back	归路	Theme song for stage play of game JX Online 3
2020/12/14	Say Goodbye	说再见吧	Theme song for movie Bath Buddy
2020/12/16	Conclude (Jie)	结	Insert song for TV series Legend of Fei
2020/12/24	Red Supreme (Hong Jue)	红绝	Ending theme for donghua Heaven Official's Blessing
2021/01/04	Sudden	蓦然	Insert song for TV series My Best Friend's Story
2021/01/08	The End of the Earth	天涯尽处	Opening theme for TV series Monarch Industry, featuring Zhou Shen
2021/01/20	Dreams nobody knows	无人知晓的梦	Ending theme for TV series Unrequited Love
2021/01/27	Miss You in a Heartbeat (Recites)	声声念	Opening theme for TV series A Girl Like Me, featuring Miriam Yeung
2021/02/26	Leave it to time	交给时间	Promotional song for movie Endless Summer
2021/03/02	Untitled	无题	Insert song for TV series Word of Honor
2021/03/15	Fell in Love With	爱上了	Insert song for TV series You Are My Hero
2021/04/27	Wandering People	流客	Insert song for TV series The Love of Hypnosis
2021/05/25	Flourish in Time	时光少年	Opening theme for TV series Flourish in Time
2021/06/01	Heartwarming Moment	心动的瞬间	Ending theme for TV series My Dear Guardian
2021/08/08	Wish of Flowers and Moon	花月愿	Character theme song for Xie Ling in Heaven Official's Blessing
2021/09/08	Born Extraordinary	不凡而生	Opening theme for TV series The Justice
2021/09/27	Mistake	过错	Ending theme for TV series The Justice
2021/11/24	The Memory About You	半暖时光	Opening theme for TV series The Memory About You
2021/11/28	Don't leave	勿离	Ending theme for TV series Heart of Loyalty, featuring Claire Kuo
2022/01/10	Wind-chasing Youth	追风少年	Theme song for movie Snow Dance

== Filmography ==
=== Variety Show ===
Year	English title	Original title	Note
2009 - 2010	One Million Star (season 6)	超级星光大道第六季	
2011 - 2012	Clash of the Choirs	梦想合唱团	
2012	Your Face Sounds Familiar	百变大咖秀	Recurring
2015	Fly to Sky	冲上云霄	
2016	The Collaboration	作战吧偶像	
2016	COME ON! (season 2)	不服来战第二季	Host
2017	Gathering! Honor of Kings	集结吧王者	
2018	Mask Singer (season 3)	蒙面唱将猜猜猜第三季	Recurring
2019	Singer 2019 (season 7)	歌手2019	Music partner (Final)
2019	Final Expert	终极高手	
2020	Singer: Year of the Hits (season 8)	歌手：当打之年	
2020	Street Waves	街头音浪	
2020 - 2021	Shine! Super Brothers	追光吧!哥哥	
2021	Singing with Legends season 3	我们的歌第三季	
2021	Time Concert	时光音乐会	EP 9, EP 10
2022	We Are the Champions	战至巅峰	
2022 - 2023	Time Concert Season 2	时光音乐会第二季	

=== Film ===
Year	English title	Original title	Role	Note	Ref.
2012	Sad Fairy Tale	伤心童话	Liu Tong		
2015	Money Game	黄金福将	Zhao Gang		
2015	The Left Ear	左耳	You Ta		
2015	Reco Kingdom 4	洛克王国4：出发！巨人谷	Hugo	Voice	
2017	Growing Pains	会痛的十七岁	Gu Mingyao		
2019	A Fantastic Encounter	悠然见南山	Nan Shan		
2021	Crazy for Buddies	我为兄弟狂	Zhong Hao		
