= Fat Buddies =

- Traditional Chinese: 胖子行動隊
- Simplified Chinese: 胖子行动队
- Directed by: Bao Bei'er
- Produced by: Abe Kwong Man-Wai; Peggy Lee
- Starring: Bao Bei'er; Wen Zhang; Clara Lee; Xu Juncong
- Production companies: Beijing Jujiao Film Cultural Media Limited Company; Haining Hema Film Industry Company Limited
- Release date: 30 September 2018 (China)
- Running time: 109 minutes
- Country: China
- Language: Mandarin

Fat Buddies (Chinese: 胖子行动队) is a 2018 Chinese action comedy film directed by Bao Bei'er and produced by Abe Kwong Man-Wai and Peggy Lee. The film stars Bao Bei'er, Wen Zhang, Clara Lee, and Xu Juncong. It was scheduled for release on September 30, 2018, in China. The film is the directorial debut from popular Chinese actor Bao Bei'er.

== Plot ==
The film revolves around a pair of big-boned, bumbling cops who find themselves at the heart of a drug trafficking case. The agent “J” was shot in the head during an A-level mission, causing damage to the intracranial hypothalamus. During the period of rehabilitating, J gradually became an obese man of three hundred pounds and suffered from severe narcolepsy, but J still considered himself a competent agent. Finally, J received the task again and went to Japan to retrieve confidential documents. After the file was obtained, J arbitrarily opened the file and decided to continue the task of hiding the organization for the organization, but he fainted in the izakaya. (The following text was removed due to improper English language translation)

== Cast ==
- Bao Bei'er as Hao Yingjun ("Handsome Hao"), a Sino-Japanese big-boned security guard at Northern Kanto General Hospital who helps Agent J in the mission to retrieve an important document.
- Wen Zhang as Jia Jengjun/Agent J, a superspy that is considered the best in the world and is sent to Japan to retrieve an important document.
- Clara Lee as Kin Shiyurin, the hot and young Japanese wife of Handsome Hao who works as a nurse at the same hospital as him.
- Zhang Menglu as C, Head of the top enforcers of Ma Tianyou
- Xu Juncong as F, one of top enforcers of Ma Tianyou
- Zeng Yijun as K, one of top enforcers of Ma Tianyou
- Guo Jingfei as Ma Tianyou, a powerful magnate and philanthropist which at the same time is a dangerous big-time drug-dealer
- Yasuaki Kurata as Northern Kanto General Hospital dean.
- Ryu Kohata as an unnamed Yakuza boss.
- Qi Yuwu as Qi
- Manfred Wong
- Song Jia
- Li Jiaqi

== Production ==
Fat Buddies marks Bao Bei'er's debut as director. He also stars in it.

Shooting began on September 23, 2017 in Japan and then took place in Arxan and Beijing. The film wrapped on December 19 of that same year.

== Release ==
The film premiered in Beijing on September 26, 2018.

On June 26, 2018, the producers announced that the film was scheduled for release on September 30, 2018.
