= Lonely Me =

Studio album by Charlene Choi
- Released: April 2009
- Recorded: 2008−09
- Genre: Cantopop
- Label: Emperor Entertainment Group

Charlene Choi chronology
Lonely Me (2009)	Another Me (2009)

Singles from Lonely Me
- 1. "Make a Wish" Released: 2008

Lonely Me is the debut studio album by Hong Kong cantopop singer Charlene Choi, member of the popular duo Twins. The album is released in April 2009 in Hong Kong. The album consists of two discs: Disc 1, CD, contains 12 songs and disc 2 is a DVD with 3 music videos.

== Background ==
After Twins have break up in March 2008 (because of Edison Chen photo scandal involving Gillian Chung), the other member of duo Charlene Choi started to record her debut album. The album, entitled Lonely Me, was released on April 9, 2009. The album contains theme song for The Butterfly Lovers movie "2 - 1". The album consists of Two discs: CD (12 songs) and a DVD (3 music videos). The album features a duet and music video, "Little Dimples" features JJ Lin which also released in his sixth studio album Sixology by Ocean Butterflies.

== Track listing ==
CD

1. "2 - 1" (theme song for The Butterfly Lovers movie)
2. "I'm Sorry"
3. "Crossover"
4. "Bowknot"
5. "Hydrogen Ballon"
6. "Knowing You, He Did Not"
7. "2 - 1" (Mandarin version)
8. "Make a Wish"
9. "Small Dimple" (Mandarin version) (featuring JJ Lin)
10. "Heartbeat Cantabile"
11. "Little Dimples" (featuring JJ Lin)
12. "Heart as Butterfly"

DVD

1. "2 - 1" (music video)
2. "I'm Sorry" (music video)
3. "Hydrogen Ballon" (music video)
4. "Knowing You, He Did Not" (music video)
