= Clara Lee =

British and South Korean actress and model (born 1985)

Clara
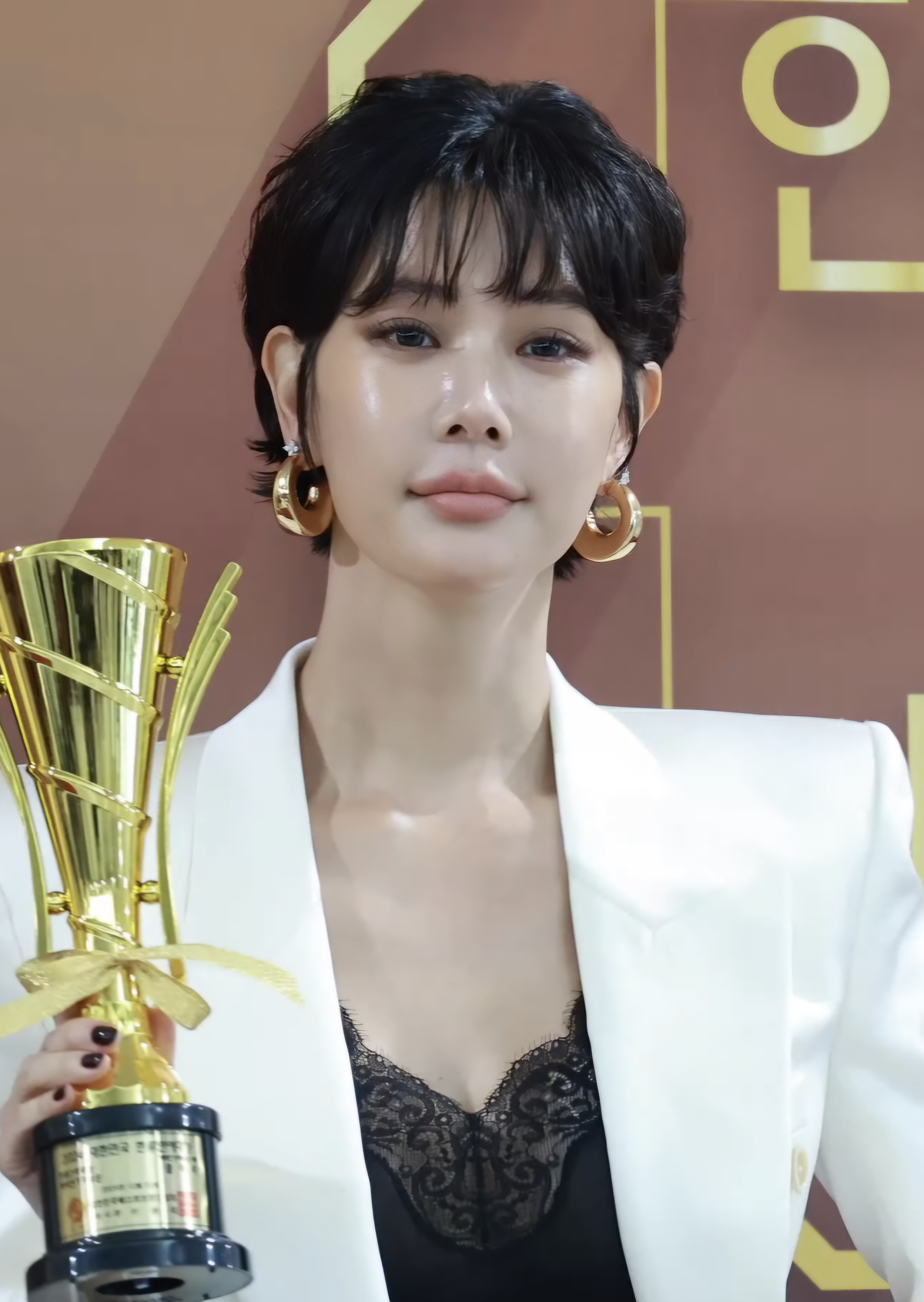
- Lee in December 2024
- Born: Lee Sung-min; 15 January 1985 (age 41); Bern, Switzerland
- Citizenship: United Kingdom; South Korea
- Education: El Camino College
- Occupations: Actress; model
- Years active: 2005–present
- Agent: CL ENM
- Spouse: Samuel Hwang (m. 2019; div. 2025)
- Parent: Lee Seung-kyu (father)

Korean name
- Hangul: 이성민
- Hanja: 李成敏
- RR: I Seongmin
- MR: I Sŏngmin

Clara Lee (Korean: 클라라 리; born 14 January 1985), birth name Lee Sung-min (이성민) and better known by her mononym Clara, is a British and South Korean actress and model.

== Early life ==
Clara was born January 14, 1985 in Bern to Korean parents. Her father is Lee Seung-kyu, a member of the bilingual band Koreana. She spent part of her childhood in South Korea. Clara's mother reportedly encouraged her to pursue a career in acting. At the age of 14, she relocated to California, United States, to learn English, where she lived for six years separate from her parents. She later earned an associate degree in Fashion Design from El Camino College.

== Career ==
=== 2005–2015: Debut and early projects ===
Clara made her entertainment debut under her birth name in 2005 and starred in her first film in 2009, Five Senses of Eros. In January 2012, she adopted Clara as her stage name, which was announced at a press conference for the drama series, Take Care of Us, Captain. Reasons given for the name change included that her birth name, Sung-min, was "male-sounding" and that her English name had always been Clara.

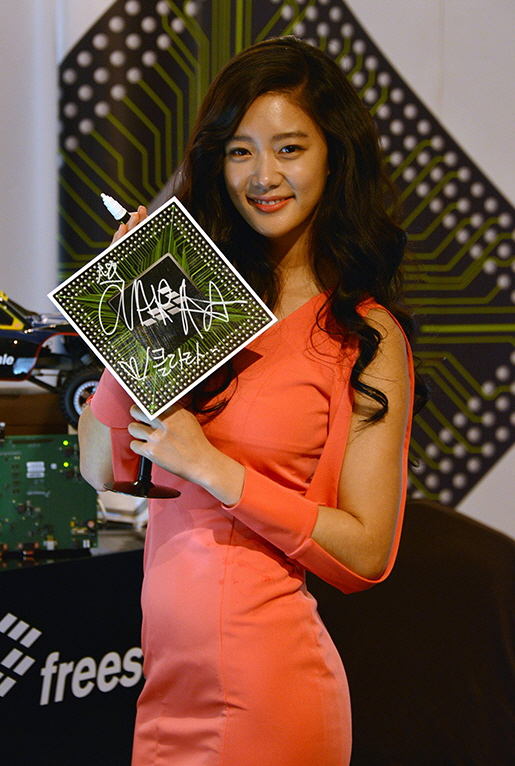
Lee in October 2013

In May 2013, Clara became an overnight sensation online after throwing a ceremonial first pitch in a professional baseball game dressed in form-fitting leggings. She has since been hailed as an up-and-coming star and a sex symbol. In September 2013, Clara drew criticism from South Korean netizens for apparently contradicting herself on television by saying she liked to eat chicken and drink beer in one program and stating the contrary in another. Consequently, she closed down her Twitter and Facebook accounts. Afterwards, she again played supporting roles in the television series Goddess of Marriage (2013) and Emergency Couple (2014), followed by a leading role in the sex comedy film Casa Amor: Exclusive for Ladies (2015).

In December 2014, she filed a lawsuit against her agency Polaris Entertainment to nullify her contract on the grounds of being sexually harassed by its president Lee Kyu-tae; Polaris denied those allegations and countered that Clara had been blackmailing the agency to end her contract which is due to expire in 2018. In July 2015, prosecutors cleared Clara of the blackmail allegations and indicted Lee for making threats against her that implied physical violence.

On 18 September 2015 Clara dropped her suit against Polaris Entertainment, bringing their legal battle to an end.

=== 2016–present: Expansion into the Chinese entertainment industry ===
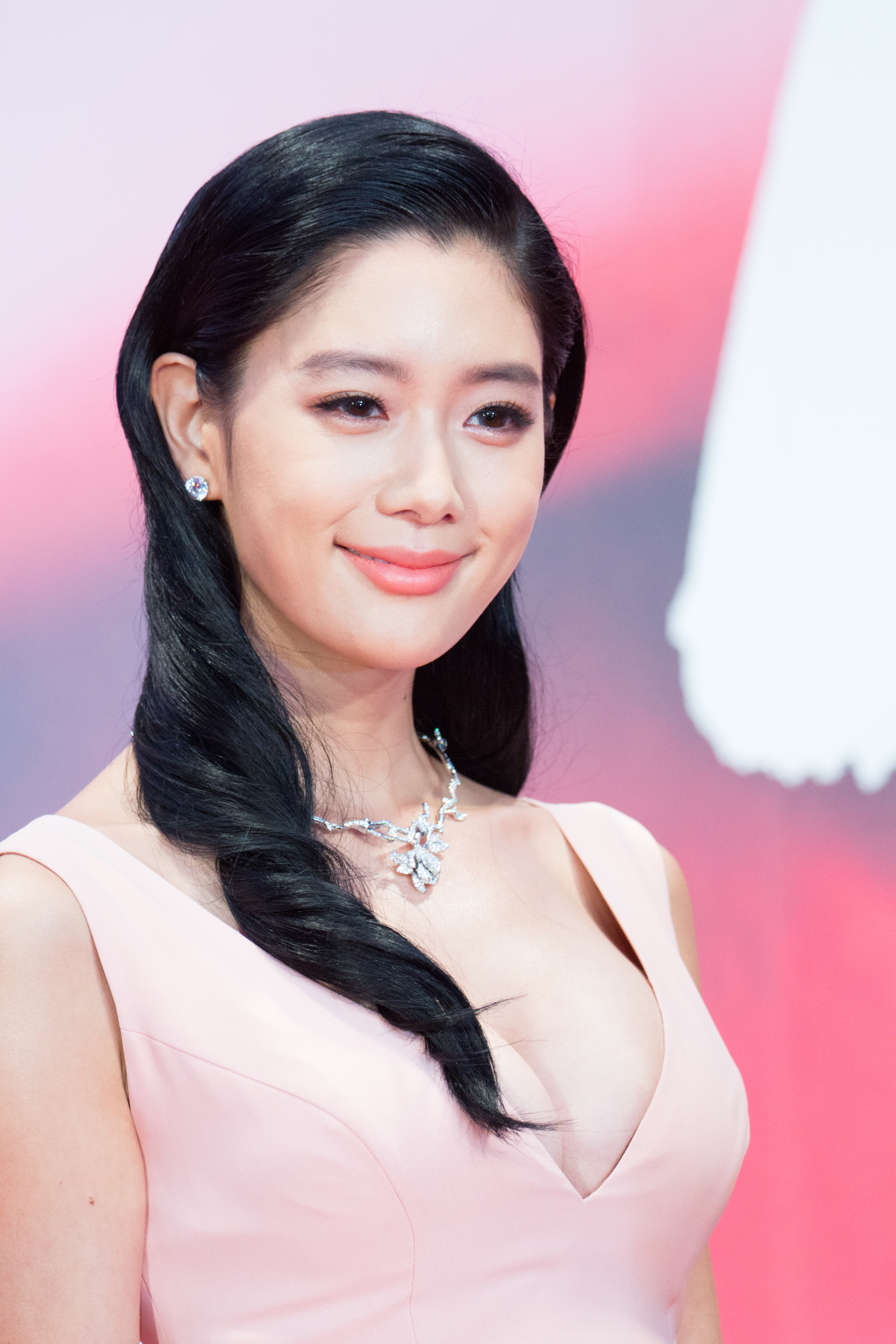
Lee at the 2017 Tokyo International Film Festival

After 2015, Clara shifted her focus toward the Chinese film industry, where she gained increasing recognition. She starred in the romantic comedy Some Like It Hot (2016), which was a major box-office success in China. Clara subsequently appeared in several other Chinese-language films, including the action thriller Bodies at Rest (2019) and the science fiction blockbuster The Wandering Earth 2 (2023).

In 2024, Clara was awarded with the Best Actress in Asian Film, and Outstanding Actress in Asian Film awards at the Asia International Film Festival (AIFF) for her work in Chinese-language productions.

== Personal life ==
In January 2019, she announced her marriage to a Korean-American businessman. The couple divorced in August 2025.

== Filmography ==
=== Film ===
Year	Title	Role
2009	Five Senses of Eros	Lee Yoon-jung (segment "Believe in the Moment")
2013	Ask This of Rikyu	Joseon noblewoman
2015	Casa Amor: Exclusive for Ladies	Oh Nan-hee
2016	Line Walker	Assassin
2016	Some Like It Hot	Yoyo
2017	The Jade Pendant	Peony
2018	Fat Buddies	Chinese immigrant's wife
2018	Love Illusion	
2018	Killing Mobile	Webcam model
2019	Bodies at Rest	Ankie Cheng
2019	Shenzhen Love	
2019	Jump Out of Primitive Tribe	
2019	Space Intellectual	
2019	Run Amuck	AK Queen
2021	Kill the Monster	
2021	Big Red Envelope	Ellie
2021	Empathic Master	
2021	Double Patty	Foreign journalist
2021	Detective Chinatown 3	Photo-taking girl
2021	Some Like It Hot 2	
2023	The Wandering Earth 2	Space-elevator attacker
2023	The Man's Secret	
2025	Never a Thief	

=== Television series ===
Year	Title	Network	Role
2006	Invisible Man, Choi Jang-soo	KBS2	Cha Hye-jin
2006–2007	High Kick!	MBC	Kim Yoon-joo (ep.64)
2009	Hilarious Housewives	MBC	Lee Sung-min
2009	Creating Destiny	MBC	Shin Jin-hee
2010	Happiness in the Wind	KBS1	Choi Mi-ran
2011	Baby Faced Beauty	KBS2	Chae Seul-ah
2012	Take Care of Us, Captain	SBS	Hong Mi-joo
2012	Tasty Life	SBS	Min Young-woo
2013	Goddess of Marriage	SBS	Cynthia Jung
2013	Reckless Family 3	MBC Every 1	Clara Park
2013	Love For Ten - Generation of Youth	Mobile drama	Kim Yang
2014	Emergency Couple	tvN	Han Ah-reum
2014	You Are My Destiny	MBC	Hye-jin (ep.1)
2014	America's Next Top Model	The CW	Herself (season 21 ep.14)
2016	Entourage	tvN	Herself (ep.2)
2017	Strong Girl Bong-soon	JTBC	Lee Bong-soon/Dental Hygienist (ep.16)
2017	Meloholic	OCN	Yun Kyung-ae
2018	Happiness Chocolate	Mango TV	
2018	The City of Chaos	iQIYI	Zheng Mengqi
2020	Detective Chinatown	iQIYI	beauty in S1E9

=== Variety show ===
Year	Title	Network	Notes
2013	Saturday Night Live Korea - Season 4	tvN	Cast (episode 20-38)
2014	Fashion King Korea - Season 2	SBS	Cast
2017	The Taming of the Shrew 2	JTBC2	Cast

=== Music video appearances ===
Year	Song title	Artist
2007	"Same Pillow"	Tei
2007	"Love Song"	Tei
2009	"Empty Bet"	Kim Joon
2009	"Toy"	Moon Hee-joon
2010	"Nothing to Lose"	Juno
2010	"Shout to the World"	December
2010	"Dazzling Tears"	December
2010	"오고있나요"	December
2013	"Joah"	Jay Park
2013	"Invitation"	House Rulez
2014	"Gwiyomi Song 2"	Clara
2014	"Fear"	Clara ft. Yasu
2017	"Hitchhiking"	Clara
2017	"I Am Clara" (Chinese ver of Hitchhiking)	Clara

== Awards and nominations ==
Year	Award	Category	Nominated work	Result
2004	1st Foce Digital Ulzzang Photo Contest	—N/a	—N/a	Won
2013	Men's Health Cool Guy Contest	Vital Woman Award	—N/a	Won
2013	6th Style Icon Awards	Chevrolet Find New Star Award	—N/a	Won
2013	6th Korea Drama Awards	Hot Star Award	Goddess of Marriage	Won
