= My Wife Is 18 =

2002 Hong Kong film by James Yuen

- Film poster
- Directed by: James Yuen
- Written by: James Yuen; Chan Hing-kai; Law Yiu-fai
- Produced by: Jimmy Law Gwok-keung; Chan Hing-kai; Jonathan Weissler; Daniel Lam; Jackson Pat
- Starring: Charlene Choi; Ekin Cheng
- Cinematography: Ko Chiu-lam
- Edited by: Chan Ki-hop
- Music by: Andy Cheung; Chiu Tsang-hei; Ho Kwan-wai
- Production companies: Universe Entertainment Ltd. People's Productions Ltd.
- Release date: 25 September 2002
- Running time: 104 minutes
- Country: Hong Kong
- Languages: Cantonese; Mandarin

My Wife Is 18 (simplified Chinese: 我老婆唔够秤; traditional Chinese: 我老婆唔夠秤) is a 2002 Hong Kong romantic comedy film.

A sequel, My Sassy Hubby (我老婆唔夠秤II：我老公唔生性), was released in 2012.

== Plot ==
The film begins in the city of London, where a 30-year-old man sits in front of a university board of 3 women. Apparently, the subject the man is being assessed in is Psychology of women, so hence the unisexual university board. The man is yet again told he has failed completely in the subject, and as he exits the university he is identified as Cheng (Ekin Cheng) by his colleagues.

Not giving up, Cheng decides to continue with the subject, but at this time, his girlfriend decides to end their relationship. With no females to talk about and understand, he cannot continue with his essay. On top of that, his mother is getting increasingly worried that he will not settle down, and urges him to marry. She introduces him to her friend's daughter Yoyo (Charlene Choi), and tells them it is a good idea to marry. In this modern world, both Yoyo and Cheng sees this as ridiculous, but Cheng's grandmother is 93 years old and she wants Cheng to marry too.

So in the end, Cheng is forced to marry Yoyo, who is 18 at the time. They make a contract that they will divorce within a year and no sexual relationship will occur. Yoyo agrees based on the fact that Cheng is quite wealthy, and she sees it as an opportunity to feed her lifestyle. By chance, Cheng becomes Yoyo's teacher, and she has to hide the relationship from her school and her crush Kelvin.

As life continues slowly, various things occur, and Yoyo slowly finds herself falling in love with Cheng.

== Cast ==
- Ekin Cheng
- Charlene Choi
- Bernice Liu
- Ronald Cheng
- Stephanie Che
