= Bao Bei'er =

Chinese actor

- 包贝尔
- Born: 3 May 1984 (age 42); Harbin, Heilongjiang, China
- Education: Beijing Film Academy
- Occupation: Actor
- Years active: 2003-present
- Spouse: Bao Wenjing (m. 2013)

Chinese name
- Simplified Chinese: 包贝尔
- Traditional Chinese: 包貝爾
Transcriptions
Standard Mandarin
- Hanyu Pinyin: Bāo Bèi'ěr

Bao Bei'er (Chinese: 包贝尔; born 3 May 1984) is a Chinese actor.

He is noted for his roles as Lu Maoku and Zhang Kai in the films Welcome to Shama Town and So Young respectively.

== Early life ==
Bao was born and raised in Harbin, Heilongjiang. His parents divorced when he was 10 years old. Bao graduated from Beijing Film Academy, majoring in acting.

== Career ==
=== Acting career ===
Bao's first film role was uncredited appearance in the film Furious Piano (2007). That same year, he also acted in Home with Kids 3, a Chinese sitcom starring Song Dandan, Andy Yang, and Zhang Yishan.

In 2008, Bao played the character Huo Qubing in the historical television series Dongfang Shuo.

For his role as Lu Maoku in Welcome to Shama Town, Bao was nominated for the Favorite Actor Award at the 16th Beijing College Student Film Festival.

In 2011, Bao participated in The Founding of a Party as Kuang Husheng, and he also appeared as Hou Xia in Mural, a Chinese epic fantasy film starring Deng Chao, Betty Sun, and Yan Ni.

In 2012, Bao had a supporting role in the film The Four. Bao reprised his role as Da Long in the sequel, The Four 2 (2014). At the same year, Bao appeared in Yu Zheng's Palace 2, a historical romantic comedy television series starring Du Chun and Mickey He, he received the TV Drama Awards nomination for Best New Actor.

In 2013, Bao played the role of Zhang Kai in Zhao Wei's film So Young, for which he received nominations at the Huabiao Awards. Bao also had a cameo appearance in Swordsman, based on the wuxia novel The Smiling, Proud Wanderer by Jin Yong.

== Personal life ==
Bao married his university love Bao Wenjing (Chinese: 包文婧) in July 2013.

== Filmography ==
=== Film ===
Year	Title	Chinese Title	Role	Notes
2007	Furious Piano	愤怒的钢琴	Wang Xiaogen	
2008	Forever Firework	烟花恋人	He Jun	
2008		复活的三叶虫	Qi Xiaoman	
2010	Welcome to Shama Town	决战刹马镇	Lu Maoku	
2010		一个人的皮影戏	Genzi	
2011	The Founding of a Party	建党伟业	Kuang Husheng	
2011	Mural	画壁	Hou Xia	
2011	Blue Tears	幸福速递	Courier	
2011	Speed Pioneer	极速先锋	Cai Xing	
2012	In-Laws New Year	亲家过年	Policeman	
2012	The Four	四大名捕	Da Lang	
2013	So Young	致我们终将逝去的青春	Zhang Kai	Nominated - Huabiao Award for Outstanding New Actor; Nominated - Hundred Flowers Award for Best Supporting Actor
2013	Mortician	临终囧事	Niu Xiaobo	
2013	Palace: Lock Sinensis	宫锁沉香	Chun Shou	
2013	Bump in the Road	一路顺疯	Zhang Xin	
2013	The Four II	四大名捕2	Da Lang	
2014	Night of Adventure	疯狂72小时		
2014	The Four III	四大名捕3	Da Lang	
2015	Zhong Kui: Snow Girl and the Dark Crystal	钟馗伏魔：雪妖魔灵		
2015	Jian Bing Man	煎饼侠		
2015	Lost in Hong Kong	港囧	Cai Lala	
2015	My Original Dream	我的青春期		
2015	This Is Me	年少轻狂		
2016	Sweet Sixteen	夏有乔木 雅望天堂		
2016	When Larry Met Mary	陆垚知马俐		
2017	Journey to the West 2	西游伏妖篇	King	
2017	Wished	反转人生	Xiao Luo	Cameo
2017	My 2B Angel			
2017	A Bed Affair 3			
2017	The Founding of an Army			
2017	The Loop			
2018	Miss Puff			
2018	Karat			
2018	Mad Ebriety			
2018	When Robbers Meet the Monster			
2018	Fat Buddies			
2019	The Big Shot			
2021	Big Red Envelope			

=== Television ===
Year	Title	Chinese Title	Role	Notes
2003	Don't Move My Drawer	别动我的抽屉	Li Tao	
2007	Home with Kids 3	家有儿女3	Liu Tao	
2007	Special Mission	特殊使命	Wu Ping	
2008	Dongfang Shuo	东方朔	Huo Qubing	
2008	Insistence	浴血坚持	Wu Shaohua	
2009		延安锄奸	Li Mantun	
2009		妙想天开	guest	
2009	Yun Xiu	云袖	Chen Jixiang	
2010	Soldier Story	战友故事	Ma Chi	
2011		桂花打工记	Bao Tiezi	
2011	Food for the Day	夺粮剿匪记	Xiao Tudou	
2011		我和老妈一起嫁	Dong De	
2011	The Olive Tree	橄榄树	Feng Guoqiang	
2011		极速先锋	Boss Cai	
2012	Beijing Love Story	北京爱情故事	Policeman	
2012	Palace 2	宫锁珠帘	Su Peisheng	
2013	Southern Shaolin	南少林荡倭英豪	Lin Yi'nan	
2013	Unique Hero	独有英雄	Mian Huatu	
2013	Like a Spark, Like a Butterfly	像火花像蝴蝶	Manager Yu	
2013	Swordsman	笑傲江湖	Tubiweng	
2014	Da Gen's Dream Life	大根的梦想生活	Li Dagen	
2014	Palace 3: The Lost Daughter	凤还巢之连城	The eunuch	
2014	Love YunGe from the Desert	云中歌	Liu He	
2014	My Queen			
2014	Woman Sutra			
2015	Cool Dad Regiment			
2015	Gen's Life & Dream			
2015	Song in the Cloud			
2016	Happy MiTan			
2017	Secret Elite			
2019	The Neighbour is My Ex-Wife	我的冤家住对门	Cai Haogui	

=== Variety ===
Year	English title	Chinese title	Role	Notes
2015	Keep Running	奔跑吧兄弟	Cast member	Season 2

== Awards and nominations ==
Year	Work	Award	Result	Notes
2010	Welcome to Shama Town	16th Beijing College Student Film Festival - Favorite Actor	Nominated	
2012	Palace 2	TV Drama Award for Best New Actor	Nominated	
2012		Sohu TV Drama Award for Best Supporting Actor	Nominated	
2013	So Young	Huabiao Film Award for Outstanding New Actor	Nominated	
2013		LeTV Award for Most Leaping Movie Actor	Won	
2013		BQ Celebrity Score Award for Most Inspirational Artist	Won	
2013		BQ Celebrity Score Award for Favorite Actor	Nominated	
2013	So Young	China International Film Festival London Award for Best Supporting Actor	Nominated	
2014	So Young	2014 Hundred Flowers Awards for Best Supporting Actor	Nominated	
2016		2016 Chinese TV Good Actor Selection for Best Actor	Nominated	
2017	When Larry Met Mary	Golden Rooster Award for Best Actor	Nominated	
2019		6th The Actors of China Award Ceremony for Best Actor (Emerald category)	Nominated	
