= The Four III =

2014 Hong Kong film by Gordon Chan and Janet Chun

- Film poster
- 四大名捕大结局
- Directed by: Gordon Chan; Janet Chun
- Screenplay by: Gordon Chan; Susan Chan; Maria Wong; Frankie Tam; Lui Koon-Nam
- Based on: Si Da Ming Bu by Woon Swee Oan
- Produced by: Paul Cheng; Gordon Chan; Abe Kwong
- Starring: Deng Chao; Liu Yifei; Collin Chou; Ronald Cheng; Anthony Wong; Jiang Yiyan; Liu Yan
- Cinematography: Yang Zhenyu; Lai Yiu-fai
- Production company: Beijing Enlight Pictures
- Release date: 22 August 2014
- Running time: 107 minutes
- Countries: China; Hong Kong
- Language: Mandarin
- Box office: US$31,040,000

The Four III (四大名捕大结局) is a 2014 Chinese–Hong Kong wuxia 3D film directed by Gordon Chan and Janet Chun. It is the final instalment of a film trilogy adapted from the novel series Si Da Ming Bu (四大名捕; The Four Great Constables) by Woon Swee Oan (Wen Ruian), after The Four (2012) and The Four II (2013).

== Cast ==
- Deng Chao as Leng Lingqi (Cold Blood)
- Liu Yifei as Sheng Yayu (Emotionless)
- Collin Chou as Tie Youxia (Iron Hand)
- Ronald Cheng as Cui Lueshang (Life Snatcher)
- Anthony Wong as Zhuge Zhengwo
- Jiang Yiyan as Ji Yaohua
- Liu Yan as Ruyan (Lady Fog)
- Yu Chenghui as An Yunshan
- Wu Xiubo as An Shigeng (God of Wealth)
- Sheren Tang as Jiaoniang (Aunt Poise)
- Waise Lee as the Prince
- Alec Su as the Emperor
- Cao Bingkun as Minister Cai
- Lai Xi as Eunuch Wu
- Bao Bei'er as Dalang (Big Wolf)
- Emma Wu as Dingdang
- Tina Xiang as Ling'er (Bell)
- Wayne Liu as Jiang Lei
