= Big Red Envelope =

2021 Chinese romantic comedy film by Li Kelong

- Promotional poster
- Traditional Chinese: 大紅包
- Simplified Chinese: 大红包
- Hanyu Pinyin: Dà Hóng Bāo
- Directed by: Li Kelong
- Screenplay by: Li Kelong
- Produced by: Ye Li, Jiang Yuxin
- Starring: Bao Bei'er, Clara Lee, Jia Bing, Zhang Yiming, Xu Juncong, Wang Xiaoli, Liao Weiwei, Yue Yueli
- Distributed by: Taopiaopiao
- Release date: 22 January 2021 (China)
- Running time: 122 minutes
- Country: China
- Language: Mandarin
- Box office: RMB 235 million

Big Red Envelope (Chinese: 大红包) is a 2021 Chinese romantic comedy film written and directed by Li Kelong and starring Bao Bei'er, Clara Lee, Jia Bing, Zhang Yiming, Xu Juncong, Wang Xiaoli, Liao Weiwei, and Yue Yueli. It is a remake of director Li Kelong's own 2014 film Cash Gift. It was released in China on 22 January 2021.

== Plot ==
Office workers Chen Zhong and Da Rui trick British Chinese actress Ellie into playing the part of Chen Zhong's bride at a fake wedding, so that they can collect red envelopes full of cash from their co-workers. But Chen Zhong's ex-girlfriend Du Ying realizes that their marriage isn't real and tries to expose their deception.

According to director Zhao Ji, the film is intended as a commentary on modern Chinese society, where gifts of red envelopes have become so frequent as to be stressful.

== Cast ==
- Bao Bei'er as Chen Zhong
- Clara Lee as Ellie
- Jia Bing as Qian Haoshi
- Zhang Yiming as Da Rui
- Xu Juncong as Gangzi
- Wang Xiaoli as Ellie's fake father
- Liao Weiwei as Du Ying
- Yue Yueli as Ellie's real father

== Release ==
In December 2020, a promotional poster was released and the film's release date was announced as 29 January 2021. On 17 January 2021 it was announced that the release would be moved up a week, and the film was released in China on 22 January 2021.

According to data from Maoyan a few days after the film's release, more than 60% of people who expressed interest in seeing it were from third and fourth tier cities, and nearly half of viewers were from fourth-tier cities. 70% of customers who rated the film were male.

On its first day, Big Red Envelope made RMB 12.47 million at the box office. It grossed a total of RMB 235 million.

== Reception ==
The film received a rating of 4.8 out of 10 on Douban, 8.4 out of 10 on Taopiaopiao, and 8.5 out of 10 on Maoyan.

Viewers criticized the sexualization of Clara Lee's character, saying that she is portrayed through the male gaze as a form of male wish fulfillment. Critic Yuan Shan described the film as a sex comedy that values lust over love, and argued that the film's focus on sexuality detracted from its attempts at social critique. Viewers also complained that the romantic plot line, in which Ellie falls in love with Chen Zhong because they kiss, was unrealistic.

Derek Elley wrote that "the droll tone of the first half gets thinner and thinner during the over-long wedding sequence and the lengthy shenanigans thereafter, with the characters evoking no real emotion by the end."

Nonetheless, there were some positive reviews. Rhinoceros Entertainment wrote that while the film wasn't highbrow, it satisfied most of its audience with a story grounded in their everyday lives.

== Sequel ==
A sequel, Big Red Envelope 2: Get Rich (大红包2：龙凤呈祥), was released in January 2025.
