= Strike at Heart =

Hong Kong television series

- 驚艷一槍
- Genre: Period Wuxia
- Written by: Chu Keng Kei
- Starring: Joe Ma; Sunny Chan; Stephen Au; Charmaine Sheh; Nnadia Chan; Annie Man
- Theme music composer: Lam Manyee
- Opening theme: Truth (真相) by Christopher Wong and Nadia Chan
- Country of origin: Hong Kong
- Original language: Cantonese
- No. of episodes: 20

Production
- Producer: Terry Tong
- Production location: Hong Kong
- Camera setup: Multi camera
- Production company: TVB

Original release
- Network: TVB Drama
- Release: 27 May – 23 June 2009

Strike at Heart
- Traditional Chinese: 驚艷一槍
- Simplified Chinese: 惊艳一枪
- Literal meaning: "A Spear of Alarm"
Transcriptions
Standard Mandarin
- Hanyu Pinyin: Jīng Yàn Yī Qiāng
Yue: Cantonese
- Jyutping: Ging1 Jim6 Jat1 Ceong1

Strike at Heart is a Hong Kong period wuxia television series based on Woon Swee Oan's novel, A Spear of Alarm produced by TVB. The series stars Joe Ma, Sunny Chan, Stephen Au, Charmaine Sheh, Nnadia Chan, and Annie Man. It was filmed in 2004 and released overseas in January 2005. Then it was aired in Hong Kong on TVB Pay Vision's TVB Drama channel from 27 May to 23 June 2009.

== Plot ==
Chu Kot Ching Ngor (Joe Ma), Yuen Sap Sam Han (Stephen Au), and hermit Tin Yee (Sunny Chan) are apprentices to the same clique. They have not seen each other for a long time. During a rare gathering, they end up at daggers drawn.

They studied in the same clique when they were young and became good friends. Due to physical constraint, Tin Yee was unsuited to Martial Arts so he turned to studying yin yang and five material agents. Chu Kot and Yuen were born to learn Martial Arts. Yuen's lifetime goal is to become the best fighter in the Martial Arts World. However, he could never beat Chu Kot before he left the clique, which bothered him enormously.

Chu Kot worked for the imperial government after he left the clique. Yuen lived a quiet life practicing Martial Arts in the hope of defeating Chu Kot one day. When Yuen reappears in the Martial Arts World, Chu Kot has become renowned and is known as Mr. Chu Kot. His immediate mission is to fight against a corrupt official Choi King (Shek Sau). Because of Choi King, Chu Kot cannot avoid having an ultimate fight with Yuen. During the fight, Yuen uses his "Heartbroken Arrow" while Chu Kot fights back with his "Strike at Heart".

In fact, Chu Kot has never really wanted to fight with Yuen. Under the vossludes of fortune, they both fall in love with a gentle and cheerful girl named Siu Keng (Charmaine Sheh).

== Cast ==
Note: Some of the characters' names are in Cantonese romanisation.

=== Main cast ===
| Cast | Role | Description |
|---|---|---|
| Joe Ma | Chu Kot Ching Ngor 諸葛正我 | Tin Yee Householder's junior Yuen Sap Sam Han's senior Siu Keng and Mung Tip's soulmate |
| Sunny Chan | Hui Siu Yat (Tin Yee Householder) 許笑一 (天衣居士) | Chu Kot Ching Ngor and Yuen Sap Sam Han's senior Chik Nui's husband |
| Stephen Au | Yuen Sap Sam Han 元十三限 | Tin Yee Householder and Chu Kot Ching Ngor's junior Siu eing's husband |
| Charmaine Sheh | Siu Keng 小鏡 | Chu Kot Ching Ngor's soulmate Yuen Sap Sam Han's wife |
| Adia Chan | Mung Tip 夢蝶 | Chu Kot Ching Ngor's soulmate Choi King's follower |
| Annie Man | Fu Ting Ling Fung (Chik Nui) 呼延靈鳳 (織女) | Tin Yee's Householder's wife God Needle Gate disciple |

=== Other cast ===
| Cast | Role | Description |
|---|---|---|
| Shek Sau | Choi King 蔡京 | Chancellor |
| Edward Mok (莫家堯) | Lang Ling Hei 冷凌棄 | Chu Kot Ching Ngor's follower |
| Steven Ho (何啟南) | Chui Leuk Seung 崔略商 | |
| Derek Kok | Fu Chung Shu 傅宗書 | Choi King's follower |
| Newton Lai (黎漢持) | Chi Ko 智高 | Siu Keng's father |
| Lawrence Yan (甄志強) | Sung Fai Chung 宋徽宗 | |
| Catherine Chau (周家怡) | Siu Hung 小紅 | |
| Lai Suen (黎宣) | God Needle Granny 神針婆婆 | Head of God Needle Gate |
| Karen Lee (李彩寧) | God Needle Gate disciple 神針門弟子 | |
| Chun Wong (秦煌) | Three Tail Priest 三鞭道人 | |
| Lo Mang | Tong Po Ngau 唐寶牛 | |
| Leung Kin Ping (梁健平) | Choi Sui Chak 蔡水澤 | |
| Samuel Kwok (郭峰) | Yuen Ngan Kwan (Wanggiya Pugya) 完顏袞 | |

== See also ==
- List of TVB series (2005)
