= The Four (film) =

2012 Hong Kong film by Gordon Chan and Janet Chun

- Film poster
- 四大名捕
- Directed by: Gordon Chan; Janet Chun
- Screenplay by: Gordon Chan; Maria Wong; Frankie Tam
- Based on: Si Da Ming Bu by Woon Swee Oan
- Produced by: Gordon Chan; Abe Kwong
- Starring: Deng Chao; Liu Yifei; Collin Chou; Ronald Cheng; Anthony Wong
- Cinematography: Lai Yiu-fai
- Edited by: Chan Ki-hop
- Music by: Henry Lai
- Release date: 12 July 2012
- Running time: 117 minutes
- Country: Hong Kong
- Language: Mandarin
- Budget: RMB80 million (US$12.5 million)

The Four (四大名捕) is a 2012 Hong Kong wuxia film directed by Gordon Chan and Janet Chun. It is the first film adaptation of the novel series Si Da Ming Bu (四大名捕; The Four Great Constables) by Woon Swee Oan (Wen Ruian), which had previously been adapted into a television series. In all adaptations and interpretations, the nicknames of the Four remained the same — Emotionless, Iron Hands, Life Snatcher and Cold Blood. They dedicated their special skills to the service of their chief, Master Zhuge, in solving crimes and apprehending powerful criminals.

The film is the first in a trilogy, the second instalment of which started shooting in 2012. The Four II was released on 6 December 2013. The last film, The Four III, was released on 22 August 2014.

== Synopsis ==
The film is set in 12th-century China during the Song dynasty. The Department Six, a government agency with full jurisdiction over criminal investigations in the imperial capital, is well-staffed and highly disciplined in its operations. Their leader, Bushen, ranks the agents by clearance and dangles the prospect of naming an agent as one of the "Great Four".

When the country experiences a significant increase in the circulation of counterfeit coin currency, resulting in growing unrest and instability, the Department Six's agents, acting on a tip-off, rush in with full force to apprehend a suspect trying to sell a coin die stolen from the imperial mint. However, they show up too late as the suspect and evidence have been taken away by agents from the Divine Constabulary, a secret service commissioned by the emperor.

A jealous Bushen openly fires Cold Blood, one of his best agents, while secretly ordering him to infiltrate the Divine Constabulary and find a way to bring down the rival agency. Bushen is unaware that the Department Six has been infiltrated by double-agents dispatched by the mastermind behind the counterfeit currency.

Despite being aware of Cold Blood's true mission, Zhuge Zhengwo, the Divine Constabulary's leader, welcomes him into the agency. Once inside, Cold Blood is surprised to observe that the Divine Constabulary staff live and work together more like a family than a highly formalised government agency. Despite their small size, they work efficiently and effectively through a few individuals with very specialised skills which are useful in solving crimes. Cold Blood finds his loyalties divided, and things are made harder as he becomes tangled in a love triangle with two women, one from each agency.

== Cast ==
- Deng Chao as Leng Linqi (Cold Blood)
- Liu Yifei as Sheng Yayu (Emotionless)
- Ronald Cheng as Cui Lueshang (Life Snatcher)
- Collin Chou as Tie Youxia (Iron Hand)
- Anthony Wong as Zhuge Zhengwo
- Jiang Yiyan as Ji Yaohua
- Wu Xiubo as An Shigeng (God of Wealth)
- Emma Wu as Dingdang
- Cheng Taishen as Bushen (Sheriff King)
- Sheren Tang as Jiaoniang (Aunt Poise)
- Ryu Kohata as Cen Chong (Avalanche)
- Michael Tong as Han Long
- Tin Kai-man as Jia San
- Waise Lee as the Prince
- Bao Bei'er as Dalang (Big Wolf)
- Tang Zhiping as Butou (Thunderclap)
- Zhang Songwen as Qian Jian (Treasury Minister)
- Fang Anna as Hudie (Butterfly)
- Miao Chi as Dayong (Guts/Berserker)
- Tina Xiang as Ling'er (Bell)
- Liu Changde as Xu Feng

== Production ==
The Four features characters from the wuxia novel series Si Da Ming Bu by Woon Swee Oan. The novels have been adapted for some television series in Hong Kong, Taiwan and China, including ATV's The Undercover Agents and TVB's The Four. Gordon Chan had started shooting the film by April 2011.

== Release ==
The Four was released in China and Hong Kong on 12 July 2012. In Hong Kong, the film premiered at 5th place at the weekend box office grossing HK$125,607. The film grossed a total of $252,829 in Hong Kong.

== Reception ==
Film Business Asia gave the film a five out of ten rating, stating that The Four "isn't exactly boring — thanks to the crowded plot and cast — but just very average, with no real tension, drama or thrills."
