= Charlene Choi =

Hong Kong singer and actress (born 1982)

- 蔡卓妍
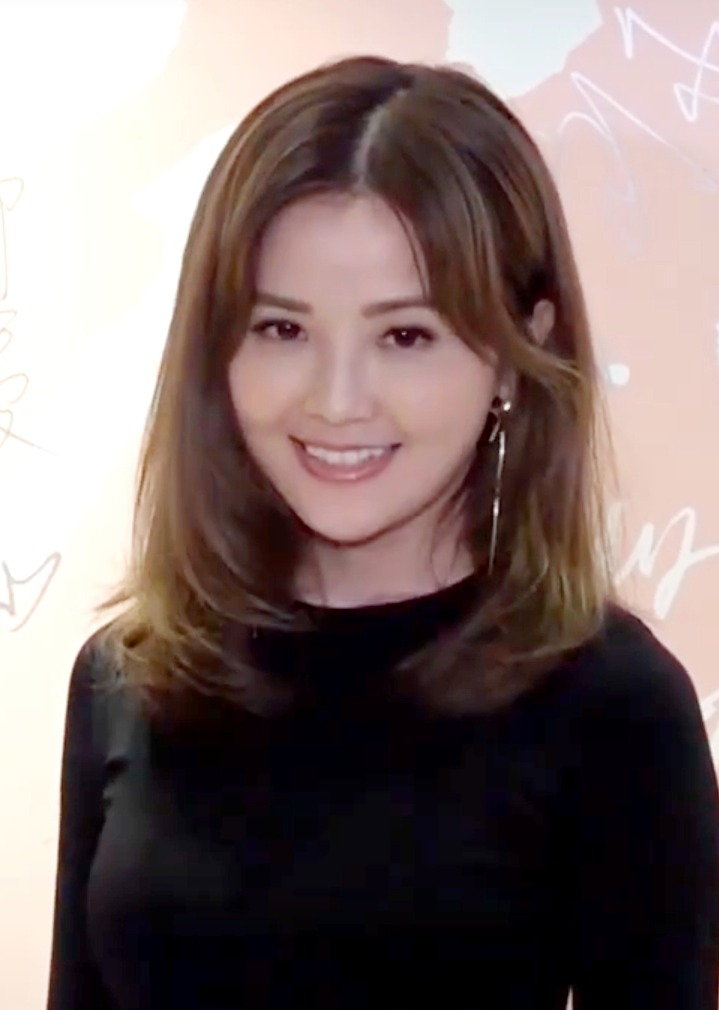
- Choi in 2019
- Born: Choi Tsoek-jin; 22 November 1982 (age 43); Vancouver, British Columbia, Canada
- Occupations: Singer; actress
- Years active: 2000–present
- Spouses: Ronald Cheng (m. 2006; div. 2010) Elvis Lam (m. 2026)
- Awards: Golden Bauhinia Awards – Best Actress; 2007 Simply Actors
- Musical career
- Origin: Hong Kong
- Genres: Cantopop; Mandopop
- Instrument: Vocals
- Label: Emperor Entertainment Group
- Member of: Twins

Chinese name
- Chinese: 蔡卓妍
Transcriptions
Standard Mandarin
- Hanyu Pinyin: Cài Zhuóyán
Yue: Cantonese
- Yale Romanization: Choi Cheukyìn
- Jyutping: Coi3 Coek3jin4
- Hong Kong Romanisation: Choi Cheuk-yin

Charlene Choi Tsoek-jin (Chinese: 蔡卓妍; born 22 November 1982) is a Hong Kong and Canadian singer and actress. She is a member of Hong Kong pop duo Twins, along with Gillian Chung.

== Early life ==
Choi was born in Vancouver, British Columbia, Canada on 22 November 1982. She moved with her family to Hong Kong a few years later. She was educated at Marymount Secondary School and Rosaryhill School. She is fluent in Cantonese, and could speak in English and Mandarin. After graduating from Rosaryhill School, where many other would-be pop stars had attended, she started working full-time as a model in Hong Kong. She was scouted by Emperor Entertainment Group (EEG), and was then linked with Gillian Chung to form the Cantopop group Twins.

== Career ==
=== Acting ===
Aside from her musical career, Choi has become a successful actress in the Hong Kong film industry. She wrote an article describing her acting career:

Earlier, I shared with everyone some of my acting experiences. This time, I want to talk about movies. As an artist, whenever I'm working, I have to show my best side and give my best performance. I have to show the fittest side of me and hence, I'm often in "battle mode". When free, I like to watch slow-paced movies. I can't stand movies with too much excitement. I'm the type who can be easily sucked into the world of the movie. That type of fast-paced movie will end up making me tense and nervous so comedy, romance or movies centered on issues of humanity all suit me better."

Choi's first acting gig was a starring role in the 2000 television drama Youth Y2K which produced by RTHK. Choi made her first film debut in 2001 in Funeral March (filmed prior to Twins' debut), which drew rave reviews from critics and earned her a Best New Performer nomination at the 21st Hong Kong Film Awards. Choi's next big acting break was in 2003 with her earnest and pretence-free portrayal of a young girl who battles through all odds in hopes of becoming a singer in Diva – Ah Hey.

Choi has taken Jim Chim as a mentor, and portrayed a kind and comedic porn star in the comedy film Simply Actors (2007). Her breakthrough role in the Pang brothers' psychological thriller Diary (2006) earned her many film award nominations and she received the Best Actress award at the 11th Bucheon International Fantastic Film Festival (BiFan Korean Movie Award). Choi's acting was identified by film critics with her portrayal of Dani Dan in Simply Actors. She won the Best Actress and Favourite Actress awards at the 2007 Golden Bauhinia Awards for her performance. Choi also played the leading role alongside the Taiwanese singer Jay Chou in the 2008 comedy-action film Kung Fu Dunk.

Choi co-starred with Wu Chun and Hu Ge in The Butterfly Lovers, based on the Chinese legend of the same name, which was released on 9 October 2008. Throughout the filming, rumors of an off-set romance between Choi and Wu Chun developed. Though they have denied such rumors, Wu stated that the pair reached an agreement with director Jingle Ma to collaborate once again in the future.

In December 2008, she began filming her first Taiwanese television drama, Calling For Love, produced by Angie Chai, co-starring with Mike He. The series was first aired in May 2010.

In December 2009 after over a year of post-production, positive response at the Shanghai International Film Festival, The Storm Warriors was released with Choi taking on the main female lead role as Second Dream and starring alongside Aaron Kwok, Ekin Cheng, Simon Yam and Nicholas Tse. Though it was only released on 10 December, The Storm Warriors ranked fifth in the Hong Kong Chinese-language box office of the year.

In 2010, after having concentrated heavily on music in the previous year, Choi started taking on more acting projects. Her first film for that year was Beauty on Duty, which she co-starred with Sandra Ng. Following that, Choi appeared in Triple Tap with Daniel Wu and Louis Koo. Choi's next film, The Jade and the Pearl, saw her co-starring with Raymond Lam and her close friends Joey Yung and Wong Cho-lam, as well as a collaboration between Choi and Lam in singing a duet theme song. Choi concluded work on God of Fortune's Inn with Nicholas Tse and Nick Cheung. She again co-starred with Nicholas Tse in Mainland Chinese television series Sword Heroes' Fate, which was aired in 2011.

Starring as Chan in Detective vs Sleuths, the latest film from director Wai Ka Fai, co-founder of Milkyway Image. As per the director's comment during interviews, Choi took the risk by performing many of the stunts herself while shooting.

=== Musical career ===
Choi's first solo song, Diva, Ah Hey!, was released in Twins' 2003 album Touch of Love. The song received a nomination for Best Song at the 23rd Hong Kong Film Awards and won a place in the Top 10 Songs at the Jade Solid Gold Songs Awards Ceremony. Choi's second solo song, Watching Movie Alone, was released in Twins' 2006 Mandarin album Around the World with 80 Dollars. Choi's third solo song, You are Not a Good Lover, was released in Twins' 2006 Cantonese album Ho Hoo Tan. This was Choi's first recorded personal composition and Twins' recorded version earned the place of Hit Song at the Metro Showbiz Hit Awards and one of the Top 10 Songs at the Jade Solid Gold Songs Awards Ceremony.

Choi's remaining two solo songs, "Little Sister" and "60 Percent", were released before the Edison Chen photo scandal in their 2008 Mandarin album Tong Hua Yan Yu. Both solo songs were extremely personal. "Little Sister" in particular recounts Choi's relationship with her mother throughout the years despite her parents' divorce at a young age and won Choi several music awards at the Metro Showbiz Hit Awards and TVB8 Music Awards.

Choi's first solo single was released in 2008 with the award-winning "Make a Wish", which sold 5000 copies within a span of 30 minutes with all proceeds going to the Make-A-Wish Foundation. Meanwhile, her two hit songs, "Little Sister" and "Make a Wish" ranked first in music charts and remained in the top 10 for four music charts over 11 weeks. With Twins placed on hiatus, Choi went on to be awarded with a variety of solo singer awards in 2008: Favorite Idol and Most Voted Singer at the Metro Showbiz Hit Awards, Most Popular Female Singer at the Vanguard Music Awards and Most Popular Hong Kong Female Artist at the Sprite Music Awards.

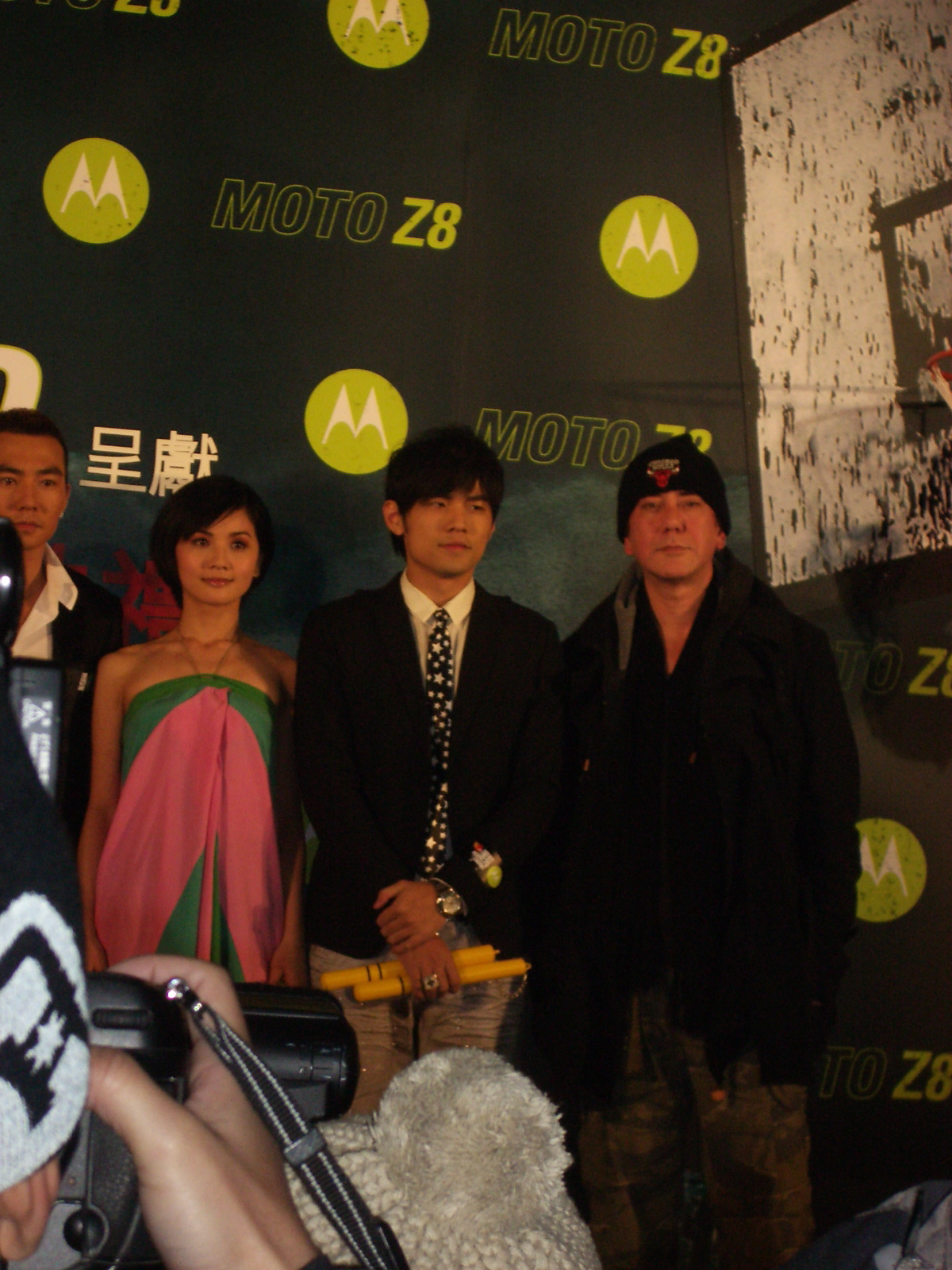
Choi promoting Kung Fu Dunk in 2008

Towards the end of 2008, Choi further expanded her career, entering new fields of the entertainment industry. In the musical Knight Star she stars as the female lead Rose. Acting as her lover, she reunited with Jimmy Lin after seven years. Lin first collaborated with Choi in her first series The Monkey King: Quest for the Sutra when she first entered the industry. Other stars in the musical include Julian Cheung, and Alice Liu. The musical served as a promotional event for the Chivas company to expand in China with their "Live with Chivalry" campaign.

Choi's first musical collaboration as a solo singer with another artist was the duet "Little Dimples", released in late September 2008, which she performed with JJ Lin. The song received six awards in the remaining three months of 2008.

Choi released her debut solo album Two Without One on 9 April 2009. In less than one week, the album sold 10,000 copies in Hong Kong and has been certified "Gold" in Hong Kong. In less than a month, the album sold a total of 30,000 copies in Hong Kong and was certified "Platinum". Due to high sales and demand, a second version of the album is slated to be released on 6 May as a limited edition with 5,000 copies available.

Following the success of Two Without One, Choi released her next EP, titled Another Me, on 15 October 2009. Consisting of five tracks and three music videos, the overall theme of the EP is an evolving process as an individual. The release of Another Me marked new territory for Choi with a black-and-white cover and a largescale photo exhibition open to the public. As with Two Without One, Another Me was also certified "Platinum", selling nearly 60,000 copies in Hong Kong, in addition to high sales in Asia and overseas. Choi's success as a solo female singer in 2009 was best displayed at the 2009 IFPI HK Top Sales Music Awards, where she was awarded "Top 10 Best Selling Hong Kong Singers of 2009". In addition, Two Without One and Another Me were each awarded "Top 10 Best Selling Cantonese Albums of 2009."

Following her success in 2009 as a solo singer, Choi released her debut Mandarin album As A Sa in 2010. With more than HK$1 million spent on producing the album, As A Sa was released across China on 15 June. Consequently, Choi launched her country-wide promotional tour with a multitude of mini-concerts, autograph sessions, performances, recorded television programs, national radio interviews, and talk shows.

Choi has released her third Cantonese album Beauty Remains on 15 October 2010.

Choi reunited with Gillian and released a new song titled "Femininity" to celebrate Twins' 20th anniversary. The music video was released on 18 May 2021, featuring Twins' songs including "Strawberry Apple Orange", "Summer Frenzy", "Thank You So Much" and "Love is Bigger than the Sky". Affected by the pandemic and quarantine policy, an online concert "TME live Super Live Twins 20 Love You Anniversary Celebration" was held that month, broadcast live exclusively with Tencent's TME and JOOX.

Later in the same year, Choi and Gillian went on recording the theme song for the movie "Sunny Sisters" and released a new song "Nice to Meet You".

Charlene signed up for the comeback survival reality show Sister Who Make Waves season 3 with her long time bandmate Gillian Chung. They were competing against a lineup of a total of 28 female artists with diverse talents. On 5 August 2022, Charlene Choi debuted at 7th place for the third season of Sisters Who Make Waves which premiered on 20 May 2022, on Mango TV.

== Personal life ==
Charlene Choi and Ronald Cheng knew each other through the film: The Pursuit of 15 August, rumors spread that they were dating on the set of the film. At the beginning of 2010, news broke out on the internet that they got married. On March 17, 2010 at the promotion of the film: The Secret Order of Beauty, she said that she had broken up with Cheng for some time, and the two were separated because of mutual understanding. Cheng admitted that he had been separated from Choi during the promotion of the film: The Treasure Box of Yue Guang. On 27 March 2010, the Apple Daily in Hong Kong published the marriage certificate that the two married in the Van Nuys, Los Angeles as early as 31 January 2006. In the evening of the same day, the two attended a press conference and admitted that they were married as early as 2006 and had completed the divorce procedures for several months.

After filming: The Secret Order of Beauty, Charlene Choi and William Chan were seen publicly kissing each other. They officially admitted their relationship on 10 October 2010. On 20 September 2015, they both issued a statement on Weibo announcing their breakup

In the fall of 2017, Charlene Choi was rumoured to be dating Shi Hengcong, and later confirmed her new relationship in person during the event. In 2019, Charlene Choi completed her second egg freezing procedure.

On April 28, 2026, Charlene Choi announced her marriage to fitness instructor Elvis Lam Chun-yin.

== Philanthropy ==
As a donor to the Make-A-Wish Foundation since 2001 and a Make a Wish ambassador in 2008, Choi released the hit single and award-winning 'Make a Wish', which sold 5000 copies within a span of 30 minutes with all proceeds going to the foundation. Choi also sold clothing from her own "SAL" clothing line to fans to raise more money for the foundation.

Choi also wrote an autobiographical book about her teenage years as a child of divorced parents. Although she remains close to both her parents, Choi lived with her father after her parents' divorce. However, following her decision to become a singer-actress, the time she spent at home and with her parents rapidly diminished. As a result, the means of communicating with her father became all the more special. In her book Single Family's Love, many little notes exchanged between her and her father over the years can be seen. Through the autobiography, readers are encouraged to find happiness in single parent families. The money raised from the 5000 Limited 1st Edition copies sold were all donated to the Make a Wish Foundation. Choi thanked her friends and fans for the good sales of her autobiography. Her friends such as Jay Chou (who wrote her book's introduction), bandmate Gillian Chung (who also put her thoughts into Choi's introduction), Niki Chow, Mani, and Wu Chun were big supporters as well, buying copies for their friends and families. As of now, a new edition of her book is being printed and will be distributed overseas.

Choi became an ambassador for the 30 Hours Famine charity in the beginning of February 2009. She went to Nepal for a week to help the locals by bringing supplies to schools. In return, she was taught the local gardening technique. In April 2009, Choi performed at the 30-Hour Famine Concert, opening the concert and performing an assortment of new Chinese and English songs, as well as old Twins songs for nearly an hour.

== Discography ==
Year	Title	Notes
2008	Make a Wish	Cantonese single
2009	Lonely Me	Cantonese album
2009	Another Me	Cantonese EP
2010	As A Sa	Mandarin album
2010	Beauty Remains	Cantonese EP
2011	Sweetest Day	Cantonese CD + Cantonese & Mandarin DVD Collection
2012	Montage	Cantonese CD + Cantonese Bonus DVD
2013	Blooming	Cantonese CD + Cantonese Bonus DVD

== Filmography ==
=== Film ===
Year	Title	Role	Notes	Ref.
2000	What Is a Good Teacher 自從他來了	Student	Cameo	
2001	Funeral March 常在我心	Wong Kwan-yee		
2001	Heroes in Love 戀愛起義之不得了	Charlene		
2002	Just One Look	Nam		
2002	My Wife Is 18	Yoyo Ma Suk-ling		
2002	Summer Breeze of Love 這個夏天有異性	Choi Kei		
2003	The Twins Effect	Helen		
2003	The Death Curse	Nancy Ting		
2003	Diva... Ah Hey 下一站...天后	Kam Dai-hei		
2003	Good Times, Bed Times 戀上你的床	Tabby	Special appearance	
2004	Protege de la Rose Noire 見習黑玫瑰	Sandy		
2004	Fantasia 鬼馬狂想曲	Chopsticks Sister	Special appearance	
2004	Hidden Heroes 追擊八月十五	Chan Mei-ling		
2004	Leave Me Alone	Jane		
2004	Love on the Rocks	Crystal Au-yeung Sum-kit	Special appearance	
2004	New Police Story	Sa Sa		
2004	Papa Loves You 這個阿爸真爆炸	Ellen Yam Yin-jai		
2004	The Attractive One 身驕肉貴	Love Cab's taxi driver	Cameo	
2004	The Twins Effect II	Spring		
2004	6 A.M.	Herself		
2005	Bug Me Not!	Sasako (Sasha)	Cameo	
2005	A Chinese Tall Story	Yue Meiyan		
2005	All About Love	Leung Tze-ching		
2005	House of Fury	Ella	Special appearance	
2006	Chicken Little	Abby Mallard	Cantonese voice-over	
2006	Rob-B-Hood	Pak Yin		
2006	Diary	Winnie Leung Wing-na		
2007	Twins Mission	Jade		
2007	Super Fans 甜心粉絲王	Sussie		
2007	Simply Actors 戲王之王	Dani Dan		
2007	Naraka 19 地獄第19層	Wendy	Special appearance	
2008	Kung Fu Dunk	Lily		
2008	The Butterfly Lovers	Zhu Yanzhi		
2009	All's Well, Ends Well 2009	Insurance agent	Cameo	
2009	The Storm Warriors	Second Dream		
2010	Hot Summer Days	Bikini girl	Cameo	
2010	Beauty on Duty 美麗密令	Zhong Aifang		
2010	Triple Tap	Ting		
2010	The Jade and the Pearl	Princess Yin		
2011	Treasure Inn	Fire Dragon Girl		
2011	The Sorcerer and the White Snake	Green Snake		
2012	My Sassy Hubby 我老婆唔夠秤II：我老公唔生性	Yoyo Ma Suk-ling		
2013	Bring Happiness Home			
2013	The Midas Touch	Suen Mei Mei		
2014	Naked Ambition 2	Maisora Aoi	Cameo	
2014	Streets of Macao		Short film	
2014	Let Go for Love			
2014	Gangster Payday	Mei		
2015	Sara	Sara		
2016	Good Take!			
2017	77 Heartbreaks	Eva Lui		
2017	Soccer Killer	Ling'er		
2017	Always Be With You	Yu-yan		
2017	Growing Pains 會痛的十七歲			
2018	Mad Ebriety 斷片之險途奪寶			
2019	The Lady Improper 非分熟女	Yuen Siu Man		
2019	Ciao UFO	Hoyi		
2020	Fatal Visit 聖荷西謀殺案	Yanny		
2021	77 Heartwarmings 感動她77次	Eva Lui		
2022	Detective vs Sleuths	Chan Yee	Alternative title: Cold Detective	
2022	Just 1 Day 給我1天	Angelfish		
2023	The Goldfinger	Carmen Cheung		
2025	My Best Bet	Ching		

=== Television ===
Year	Title	Role	Network	Notes	Ref.
2000	Youth Y2K 青春@Y2K	Cheng Shasha	RTHK		
2001	The Monkey King: Quest for the Sutra	Purple Orchid	TVB		
2003	Triumph in the Skies	Charlene	TVB	Cameo	
2003	All About Boy'z	Langlang Princess	now.com.hk	Appearance in episode 2	
2003	2半3更之困𨋢	Ah Sa	now.com.hk		
2004	Kung Fu Soccer		TVB	Guest star	
2004	Sunshine Heartbeat	Ah Sa	TVB	Guest star	
2004	家有寶貝	Ah Sa		Guest star	
2007	Colours of Love 森之愛情	Wai-fong / Ching-lan	TVB		
2007	Life Off Stage				
2010	Calling for Love! 呼叫大明星	Chen Dexin	CTS		
2011	The Legend of Swordman 劍俠情緣	Tang Xiaowan / Ning Xin			
2012	Happy Marshal 歡樂元帥	Little Dragon Girl (Xiao Long Nu)			
2018	Police Tactical Unit 机动部队	Ho Wai-Ling			
2022	Twins Flower Shop 双生花店	Charlene		Short series (都市短剧)	
2022	Forensic JD 女法医JD	JD (Jane Doe) / Song On Yin	Tencent Video	Twins 20th anniversary reunion drama	

=== Variety shows and other shows ===
Year	Title	Network	Notes	Ref.
2014	囍从天降	Tianjin TV	Appearance in episode 1–2	
2016	Fresh Sunday 透鲜滴星期天	Mango TV	Appearance in episode 8	
2016	Run for Time S02 – The Time Guardians 全员加速中 第二季	Mango TV	Appearance in episode 9	
2016	Happy Camp 快乐大本营	Mango TV	Guest Star	
2017	心路	Tencent Video	Appearance in episode 4	
2017	王牌对王牌2	Zhejiang TV	Appearance in episode 4	
2017	熟悉的味道2	Zhejiang TV	Appearance in episode 9	
2017	饭局的诱惑	Tencent Video	Appearance in episode 2	
2017	Keep Running S2 奔跑吧	Zhejiang TV	Appearance in episode 3–4	
2017	If You Can Talk 冒犯家族	iQIYI	Appearance in episode 7	
2018	没想到吧	SMG Shanghai TV	Appearance in episode 1	
2019	鲁豫有约一日行第9季	NengLiang Media	Guest star (Twins)	
2019	没想到吧	SMG Shanghai TV	Appearance in episode 11	
2019	Happy Camp 快乐大本营	Mango TV	Guest star (with Joey Yung)	
2020	Do姐有問題	TVB		
2021	因为是朋友呀	Douyin	Appearance in episode 1–12 (Twins + Joey Yung)	
2021	Happy Camp 快乐大本营	Mango TV		
2021	Perfect Summer S2 完美的夏天2	Dragon TV	Appearance in episode 5–7 (Twins)	
2022	Sweet Tasks 2022 甜蜜的任务 2022	Mango TV	Guest star (Twins)	
2022	Hello Saturday 你好，星期六	Mango TV	Guest star (Twins + Joey Yung)	
2022	朋友请听好2	Mango TV	Appearance in episode 4	
2022	Sisters Who Make Waves (Season 3) 乘风破浪3	Mango TV	Debuted 7th place	
2022	The Late Lovers 迟到的恋人	MiGu	Appearance in episode 3–5	
2022	百川可逗鎮	Douyin	Guest star (Twins)	
2022	Promise For You 星星的约定	Mango TV	EP1 released. Off air.	
2022–2023	Meet Rosy Clouds 与彩云相遇	Yunnan Int. Channel	Renamed from Original 'Promise For You'	
2022–2023	Hunan Satellite TV's 2022 – 2023 New Year's Eve Concert 湖南卫视2022–2023跨年晚会	Mango TV	2 Performances (Twins + First Day)	

== Awards and nominations ==
2002

- 21st Hong Kong Film Awards – Nominated for Best New Performer Award for Funeral March

2004

- 10th Hong Kong Film Critics Society Awards – Nominated for Best Actress Award for The Death Curse
- 23rd Hong Kong Film Awards – Nominated for Best Original Film Song Award for Diva, Ah Hey
- 4th Chinese Film Media Awards – Awarded Most Popular Actress Golden Award (Hong Kong and Taiwan) for Diva, Ah Hey! / The Twins Effect

2006

- Yahoo! Search Award 2006 – Awarded Local Movie Actress Award
- Metro Radio King of Entertainment News – Awarded Queen of Actress Award

2007

- HKSAR 10th Anniversary Film Awards – Awarded My Favourite New Generation Actress Award
- HKSAR 10th Anniversary Film Awards – Awarded Most Potential Actress Award
- Hong Kong Filmart 2007 – Awarded Most Popular Local Actress Award (Top 5)
- 11th Puchon International Fantastic Film Festival(PiFan) – Awarded Best Actress Award for Diary
- 12th Golden Bauhinia Awards – Awarded Best Actress Award for Simply Actors
- 12th Golden Bauhinia Awards – Awarded Most Popular Actress Award for Simply Actors
- 5th MTV Super Award – Awarded Most Characteristic Actress Award (Hong Kong and Taiwan)

2008

- 14th Hong Kong Film Critics Society Awards – Nominated for Best Actress Award for Simply Actors
- 27th Hong Kong Film Awards – Nominated for Best Actress Award for Simply Actors
- 3rd Tencent 2008 Net Star Ceremony – Awarded Best Actress for Taiwan and Hong Kong for The Butterfly Lovers
- Metro Radio Hit Mandarin awards – Awarded Hit Song Little Sister
- Metro Radio Hit Mandarin awards – Awarded Favorite Karaoke Song Little Sister
- Metro Radio Hit Mandarin awards – Awarded Favorite Idol
- Yes Idol 2008 – 4 awards received – Including Female Yes Idol of 2008.
- Vanguard 2008 Music Event 《音乐先锋榜》 – Awarded Most Popular Female Singer award
- TVB8 Music award – awarded a Top Ten Gold Song award aka Golden Song award Little Sister
- The Sixth "Yahoo! Popular Search Awards 2008" – awarded Most Popular Song – Make A Wish
- The Sixth "Yahoo! Popular Search Awards 2008" – JJ and Charlene Choi awarded Most Popular Mandarin Song – Little Dimple
- 3rd Quarter TVB music awards – awarded China's Most Popular Song Little Dimple
- TVB Weekly, "The Most Popular Brand Awards 2008" – awarded Queen of Advertisement 2008
- Metro Radio Hits Music Songs: Make a Wish
- Metro Radio Hits Karaoke Songs Awards – Little Dimples
- Metro Radio Hits Songs Awards: Little Dimples
- Metro Radio Hits Most Voted Singers Big Awards: Charlene Choi
- Baidu 2008 Most Searched Taiwan and Hong Kong Actress
- Baidu 2008 Most Searched Duet – Little Dimple
- Sprite Music Awards – Awarded Most Popular Female Artist (Hong Kong)
- Sprite Music Awards – Awarded Best Duet (Little Dimples)
- Sprite Music Awards – Awarded Media Award (Hong Kong)

2009

- Music King Awards – Big Media Award
- Yahoo! Brand Awards – Brand Award for Coca-Cola Ad with William Chan
- Sina Music Awards – Top 20 Most Listened Songs for Make a Wish
- Metro Music Mandarin Awards – Top 21 Songs for Little Dimples
- Metro Music Mandarin Awards – Best Karaoke Song for Little Dimple
- Metro Music Mandarin Awards – Most Popular Idol (Hong Kong & Taiwan)
- HK Radio Station – Ranked #4 for Female Artist with the Most Airplay
- Singapore Golden Melody Awards – Nomination for Favorite Female Artist Award (Taiwan, Singapore, Hong Kong – The only Hong Kong Female Singer nominated)
- Top 5 Best Selling Actress 2009 (3rd year in a row)
- Jade Solid Gold Round 1 Awards – Excellent Election-Winning Classics for Two Without One
- Jade Solid Gold Round 2 Awards – Excellent Election-Winning Classics for I'm Sorry
- TVB Weekly Most Popular Brand Awards – Most Popular Advertising Female Artist Award (second year in a row)
- Global Chinese Music Awards – Best Duet for Little Dimple
- Global Chinese Music Awards – Golden Melody Award for Two Without One
- Global Chinese Music Awards – Top 5 Most Popular Mandarin Female Singers
- HKFDA (HK Fashion Designers Association Annual Best Dressed Personalities Award Show – Top 10 Best Dressed Personalities
- Touch Icon Awards – Touch Icon of the Year
- Yahoo! Asia Buzz Awards – People's Choice Best Dressed Award
- Yahoo! Asia Buzz Awards – Top 10 Most Searched Songs Award for Two Without One
- JSG Round 3 Awards – Top 14 Songs for Survivor
- 2009 China Digital Music Awards – Most Downloaded Duet for Little Dimple (5,465,381 times)
- Baidu 4th Most Searched Taiwan and Hong Kong Female Singer (74,539,012 hits)
- MOOV #9 Most Downloaded Song of 2009 for Two Without One (108,049 downloads)
- Metro Radio Survey of Over 10,000 Hong Kong high school students: Students' Favorite Female Singer (2nd place)
- Metro Radio Survey of Over 10,000 Hong Kong high school students: Idol with the Healthiest Image (1st place among male & female singers)
- Metro Radio Hits Awards – Top 21 Hit Song Award for Two Without One
- Metro Radio Hits Awards – Top 4 Best Female Singers Award
- Metro Radio Hits Awards – Top 4 Cover Songs for I'm Sorry
- Metro Radio Hits Awards – Top 3 Most Voted Singers Award
- Metro Radio Hits Awards – Ultimate 4 Channels Album Outstanding Performer Big Award GOLD
- TVB8 Music Awards – Top 10 Mandarin Songs for Two Without One
- Among Movie Actresses in Hong Kong, Taiwan, and Mainland China: #4 Highest Revenue in 2009
- Among Movie Actresses in Hong Kong, Taiwan, and Mainland China: Highest Salary per movie
- Chosen among professionals in all of Hong Kong, Taiwan, and Mainland China as #2 in "Ten Most Beautiful Women of 2009"

2010

- RTHK Top 10 Chinese Gold Songs Awards – Hong Kong & Taiwan Top 10 Excellent Singers Winners
- RTHK Top 10 Chinese Gold Songs Awards – National Award for Top 5 Best Female Artists
- RTHK Top 10 Awards – Top 5 Female & Male Artist Broadcasts/Radio Airplays
- U-Channel Radio Music Awards – Millennium's Decade Artist with the Healthiest Image
- Canadian Hit Music Awards – North America's Most Esteemed Top 10 Songs for Two Without One
- JSG Top 10 Awards – Golden Melody Top 10 Songs Award for Two Without One
- JSG Top 10 Awards – Outstanding Performer Award (Silver)
- Sina Music Awards – Top 20 Most Listened Songs for Two Without One
- Sina Music Awards – Outstanding Performer Award
- Sina Music Awards – Most Searched (Hits) Artist Award
- Yahoo! Poll – Voted as Netizens' Most Ideal Lover
- Bravely March Forward Show – Won Best Actress Title
- IFPI HK Top Sales Music Awards – Top 10 Best Selling Hong Kong Singers of 2009
- IFPI HK Top Sales Music Awards – Top 10 Best Selling Cantonese Albums of 2009 for Two Without One Album
- IFPI HK Top Sales Music Awards – Top 10 Best Selling Cantonese Albums of 2009 for Another Me EP
- 2010 Forbes China Celebrity 100 List – Ranked No. 52 Among All Celebrities from China, Hong Kong, Taiwan combined (Based on 2009 income and frequency of media exposure)
- JSG Round 1 Awards – Top 14 Golden Melody Awards for Able to Let Go
- Yahoo! Brand Awards – Most Ideal & Desired Spokesperson Award
- QQ Music (China's largest internet music platform) – No. 1 Overall Music, No. 1 Mandarin Music, No. 1 New Music for Confidant
- QQ Music (China's largest internet music platform) – No. 2 Ranked Album for As A Sa
- Music King Awards – Nominated as Most Popular Hong Kong Female Singer
- Metro Radio Mandarin Hit Music Awards – Hit Female Singer Award
- Metro Radio Mandarin Hit Music Awards – Most Popular Global Idol Award
- Metro Radio Mandarin Hit Music Awards – Top Mandarin Hit Songs for Confidant
- 7th Music King Awards – The Album of the Year for Two Without One
- 7th Music King Awards – Top 10 Golden Melody Mandarin Songs for Confidant
- 25th China Golden Eagle TV Awards – Nomination for Hong Kong & Taiwan's Most Popular TV Series for Calling For Love
- Golden Melody Music Awards – Best KTV Song of the Year for Little Dimples
- Golden Melody Music Awards – Top 10 Mandarin Songs for Big Storm

2013

- 5th Macau International Movie Festival – Nominated for Best Supporting Actress Award for The Midas Touch

2014

- 6th Macau International Movie Festival – Awarded Best Actress Award for Sara

2015

- 15th Chinese Film Media Awards – Most Popular Actress Audience Award for Sara
- 15th Chinese Film Media Awards – Nominated for Best Actress Award for Sara
- 34th Hong Kong Film Awards – Nominated for Best Actress Award for Sara
- 22nd Hong Kong Film Critics Society Awards – Nominated for Best Actress Award for Sara
- 10th Osaka Asian Film Festival – Special Mention for Sara

2019

- 38th Hong Kong Film Awards – Nominated for Best Actress Award for The Lady Improper
- 11th Macau International Movie Festival – Awarded Best Actress Award for The Lady Improper
- Macau International TV Festival – Best Performance Actress for PTU Police Tactical Unit

2020

- 39th Hong Kong Film Awards – Nominated for Best Supporting Actress Award for Fatal Visit
- Macau International Movie Festival – Nominated for Best Supporting Actress Award for Fatal Visit

2021

- Macau International Movie Festival – Nominated for Best Actress Award for 77 Heartwarmings
