= The Collaboration (TV program) =

- Genre: Survival show, Music
- Presented by: Wu Xin; Zhang Yu An
- Countries of origin: China; South Korea
- Original languages: Chinese; Korean
- No. of seasons: 2
- No. of episodes: 10

Production
- Production location: China
- Running time: 60 minutes

Original release
- Network: Tencent; SBS MTV; SBS funE
- Release: June 30 – September 1, 2016

The Collaboration is a 2016 Chinese and South Korean collaboration television program focused on creating a collaboration between South Korean and Chinese artists. It airs simultaneously in China on Tencent and in South Korea on SBS MTV every other Thursday at 8:00 pm (CST) and 9:00 pm (KST). It is co-created by Peng Xun and SBS for the 24th anniversary of the China-South Korea relations. Season 2 (The Collaboration Season 2) takes place in 2018

== Contents ==
The Collaboration is essentially a variety show focused on creating a collaboration between Korean and Chinese artists on music, composition and performance. A survival/competition show where 4 teams will be formed and songs composed will be voted on.

Between episode 2 and 9, there will be voting from netizens to pair the participants for collaboration. The song that receives the most votes in recording room in each episode will go to the final round. The song that receives the most votes from both recording room and online in the final round will win.

There will be 4 teams. Each team will have 1 participant from Korea and 1 from China.

== Participants ==
| Team China | Team Korea |
|---|---|
| Wang Yue Xin | Jay Park |
| Joker Xue | Mino |
| Hu Xia | Zico |
| Yu Tian | Seungyoon |

== Episodes ==
Episode 1: Artists' individual performances

- Joker Xue - Actor
- Wang Yue Xin - Do You Understand?
- Hu Xia - Those Years
- Yu Tian - There's A Power Named As Fool Power
- Jay Park - I Like To Party, Mommae
- Mino - Fear, I'm Him
- Zico - Veni Vidi Vici, Turtle Ship
- Seungyoon - Wild & Young, It Rains

Episode 2: Team selection

Pairs were made based on the glasses each of them chose.

| Teams | Song | Audience Result | Online Result |
|---|---|---|---|
| Mino & Joker Xue | Fear | Won | |
| Seungyoon & Yu Tian | Back In Time | | Won |
| Zico & Hu Xia | I Am You, You Are Me | | |
| Jay Park & Wang Yue Xin | Joah | | |

Episode 3: Chinese songs

| Teams | Song | Audience Result | Online Result |
|---|---|---|---|
| Jay Park & Wang Yue Xin | A Little Happiness (Our Times OST) | | |
| Zico & Hu Xia | Faith (Fleet of Time OST) | Won | |
| Seungyoon & Yu Tian | Secret (Secret OST) | | Won |
| Mino & Joker Xue | Silent (You Are My Sunshine OST) | | |
