= Some Like It Hot (2016 film) =

- Poster
- Chinese: 情圣
- Directed by: Song Xiaofei; Dong Xu
- Written by: Xiao Li; Miao Yu
- Produced by: Tian Tian; Yi Lin
- Starring: Xiao Yang; Yan Ni; Xiaoshenyang; Qiao Shan; Ailun
- Cinematography: Liwei Pei; Xiaofei Song
- Edited by: Yiran Tu
- Music by: Xiaoyang Gao; Bin Li; Zhe Wang
- Production companies: New Classic Media Corporation; Wanda Media; Shanghai Ruyi Jiepanxia Film And Television; Huaxia Film Distribution; Tianjin Maoyan Media iQiYi Pictures
- Distributed by: Xinli Movie Distribution (Tianjin); Tianjin Maoyan Media; Huaxia Film Distribution; Beijing Baidu Nuomi Information Technology; Shanghai Tao Piao Piao Entertainment
- Release date: 30 December 2016 (China)
- Running time: 113 minutes
- Country: China
- Language: Mandarin
- Box office: US$95.3 million

Some Like It Hot is a 2016 Chinese romantic comedy film directed by Song Xiaofei and Dong Xu and stars Xiao Yang, Yan Ni, Xiaoshenyang, Qiao Shan, and Ailun. It was released in China on December 30, 2016. It won the Outstanding Film Contribution Award at the Hengdian Film and TV Festival of China

== Plot summary ==
Xiao Han is a married man who has lived an uneventful life for 40 years and suffers from deep anxiety following the death of a schoolmate, Queen Wang. Wanting to feel young and energetic again, he sets out to win over a Korean model named Yoyo, with the help of three friends. His efforts unintentionally lead to a romantic misunderstanding with his superior, Ma Lilian, on whom his friend Ai Mu has a crush.

== Cast ==
Actors	Roles	Citations
Xiao Yang	Xiao Han	
Xiaoshenyang	Liu Lei	
Clara Lee	Yoyo	
Yan Ni	Ma Lilian	
Qiao Shan		
Ailun		
Dai Lele		
Chang Yuan		
Che Xiao		
Tian Yu		

== Reception ==
The film has grossed CN¥653.7 million in China.

== Production ==
The movie, with a running time of 113 minutes, was co-produced by the following companies:

- New Classic Media Corporation
- Wanda Media
- Shanghai Ruyi Jiepanxia Film And Television
- Huaxia Film Distribution
- Tianjin Maoyan Media
- iQiYi Pictures

and was distributed by the following companies:

- Xinli Movie Distribution (Tianjin)
- Tianjin Maoyan Media
- Huaxia Film Distribution
- Beijing Baidu Nuomi Information Technology
- Shanghai Tao Piao Piao Entertainmen
