= The Four II =

2013 Hong Kong film by Gordon Chan and Janet Chun

- Film poster
- 四大名捕2
- Directed by: Gordon Chan
- Screenplay by: Gordon Chan; Lui Koon-Nam; Frankie Tam
- Based on: Si Da Ming Bu by Woon Swee Oan
- Produced by: Gordon Chan
- Starring: Deng Chao; Liu Yifei; Collin Chou; Ronald Cheng; Anthony Wong
- Cinematography: Yang Zhenyu; Tony Miu Kin-Fai
- Production company: Beijing Enlight Pictures
- Release date: 6 December 2013
- Running time: 118 minutes
- Country: Hong Kong
- Language: Mandarin
- Box office: $28,170,000

The Four II (四大名捕2) is a 2013 Hong Kong wuxia film directed by Gordon Chan and Janet Chun. A sequel to The Four (2012), it was followed by The Four III in 2014. All three movies are adapted from the novel series Si Da Ming Bu (四大名捕; The Four Great Constables) by Woon Swee Oan (Wen Ruian).

== Synopsis ==
Cold Blood chances upon the scent of blood while Department Six and the Divine Constabulary are setting up camp in a foggy forest. Running ahead of the others, Cold Blood, Life Snatcher, Iron Hand and Ji Yaohua arrive in front of a locked and seemingly abandoned house. In attempt to break the lock, Cold Blood is attacked by a cannon and barely escapes. He notices the person behind the cannon - Zhuge Zhengwo. Keeping the information to himself, the rest of Department Six and the Divine Constabulary rush into the house to discover the bloodshed of many and there is only one survivor, a man Zhuge Zhengwo identifies as Ouyang Da, someone whose had disappeared from the jianghu 12 years ago. Every one else have died of similar wounds, all caused by the same weapon that Cold Blood was attacked with. Zhuge Zhengwo shows keen interest in the incident and promptly asks Bushen to turn over the case to the Divine Constabulary. Bushen agrees, and Ji Yaohua along with the others in Department Six protest; there have been similar cases of massacres that they have been investigating, each with a death of a man that was supposed to have died twelve years ago. The deaths are all tied to Zhuge Zhengwo, as these men were part of the Gang of Twelve supposedly executed by him when they massacred Sheng Yayu's, now Emotionless, family. Department Six strongly believe it is likely that Zhuge Zhengwo had lied about executing the Gang of Twelve and rose to fame, only to silence those that were supposed to have been dead for twelve years now so that his secret would not be found out. Bushen believes in his friend but instructs Department Six to continue investigate quietly.

Meanwhile, An Shigeng has not died from causing himself explode into flames. His father, Lord An, has him being restored to life with the use of a certain tree-like organism and is planning to usurp the throne at all costs. An Shigeng questions his father's actions and Lord An only replies that everything he does is for the good of his son.

Ji Yaohua has nightmares about being attacked in her sleep. Restless and convinced someone is out to get her, she is finally kidnapped by Lady Fog, her senior who is working for Lord An, one night. Lady Fog brings her to An Shigeng and Ji Yaohua is shocked to find him alive. However, she begins to work for Lord An after she's given a poisonous pill. In order for her to remain alive she will need a monthly antidote that only Lord An possesses. Her loyalties are divided and she asks Cold Blood to meet her at a teahouse. The purpose of the rendezvous is to reveal all of the investigations done by Department Six. Cold Blood has Emotionless accompany him to the meeting. Emotionless is unable to cope with the fact that Zhuge Zhengwo is the prime suspect in the murders. In addition, she intimates that Zhuge Zhengwo may have been lying to her about executing the Gang of Twelve. She hurriedly leaves. Cold Blood quickly follows her. Ji Yaohua is disappointed over the fact that this liaison was not one between herself and Cold Blood.

Back at the Divine Constabulary, Cold Blood questions Zhuge Zhengwo and reveals he saw him behind the cannon that day he tried to break the lock of the abandoned house. Zhuge Zhengwo admits that he recognised the weapon used, for it was the very same weapon he was gifted by the Emperor when he served as the chief bodyguard, but he had turned them in to the imperial archives long ago as he did not want to use such weapons of great destruction. He is perplexed by Cold Blood's incessant questioning about being the assailant that day at the abandoned house as well as refused answer anything regarding Emotionless's family massacre. He asks Cold Blood to give him two days to solve the mystery and Cold Blood agrees. However, before the two days are up, Bushen is found dead and all evidence seemingly point to Zhuge Zhengwo as the murderer. Cold Blood's animalistic side gets the better of him and he attacks Zhuge Zhengwo, blaming his acquiesce to the two-day request as the reason behind the death of the man who brought him up. Meanwhile, another member of the Gang of Twelve claims to be meeting up with Zhuge Zhengwo at the very place Bushen was found dead, but before any questions can be asked, Emotionless kills him to exact her revenge. She is furious that she had been deceived for more than a decade but before she can get any answers from Zhuge Zhengwo, they are promptly arrested by Ji Yaohua who has taken over Department Six; one for the murder of Bushen and one for the murder of a key witness.

With their chief in command and a quarter of their team locked up for murder, Cold Blood, Iron Hand and Life Snatcher are at a loss, leaving the Divine Constabulary hanging by a thin thread.

== Cast ==
- Deng Chao as Leng Lingqi (Cold Blood)
- Liu Yifei as Sheng Yayu (Emotionless)
- Collin Chou as Tie Youxia (Iron Hand)
- Ronald Cheng as Cui Lueshang (Life Snatcher)
- Anthony Wong as Zhuge Zhengwo
- Jiang Yiyan as Ji Yaohua
- Wu Xiubo as An Shigeng (God of Wealth)
- Liu Yan as Ruyan (Lady Fog)
- Cao Bingkun as Minister Cai
- Sheren Tang as Jiaoniang (Aunt Poise)
- Emma Wu as Dingdang
- Yu Chenghui as An Yunshan
- Cheng Taishen as Bushen (Sheriff King)
- Bao Bei'er as Dalang (Big Wolf)
- Miao Chi as Dayong (Guts/Berserker)
- Tina Xiang as Ling'er (Bell)
- Tang Zhiping as Butou (Thunderclap)
- Wayne Liu as Jiang Lei
- Cheung Siu-fai as Sheng Dingtian
- Kathy Chow as Xiuyi
