= Love on the Rocks (film) =

2004 Hong Kong film by Dante Lam and Chan Hing-ka

- DVD cover
- Directed by: Dante Lam; Chan Hing-ka
- Written by: Chan Hing-ka
- Produced by: Chan Hing-ka; Amy Chin
- Starring: Louis Koo; Gigi Leung; Charlene Choi; Donnie Yen
- Cinematography: Horace Wong
- Edited by: Cheung Ka-fai
- Music by: Chiu Tsang-hei; Andy Cheung
- Production companies: One Hundred Years of Film; Sil-Metropole Organisation; Icon Pictures
- Distributed by: China Star Entertainment Group
- Release date: 8 April 2004
- Running time: 103 minutes
- Country: Hong Kong
- Language: Cantonese
- Box office: HK$11,290,017

Love on the Rocks (Chinese: 戀情告急) is a 2004 Hong Kong romantic comedy film directed by Dante Lam and Chan Hing-ka. The film stars Louis Koo and Gigi Leung, with special appearances by Charlene Choi and Donnie Yen.

== Cast ==
- Louis Koo as Wong Kai-Ming
- Gigi Leung as Annie
- Charlene Choi as Crystal Yeung
- Donnie Yen as Victor Tsui
- Rain Li as May
- Kathy Chow Man-kei as Judy
- Cheuk Wan-chi Barbie
- Alex Fong Lik-Sun as Policeman
- Chan Fai-hung as Danny
- Benz Hui as Annie's dad
- Gillian Chung as Mandy
- Carl Ng as Ray
- Raymond Leung as Mr. Lee
- Uncle Ba as Danny's uncle
- Chan Man-lei as Mr. Lee
- Ng Choi-yuk as Suki
- Terence Tsui as On Bak
- Poon An-ying as Mrs. Lee
- Chan Hung as Mrs. Lee's son
- Lau Ka-wan as Waitress
- William Chow as Ken
- Lam Siu-cham as Victors' mom
- Cheng Ka-fai as Mandy's friend
