= Ronald Cheng =

Hong Kong singer and actor (born 1972)

- 鄭中基
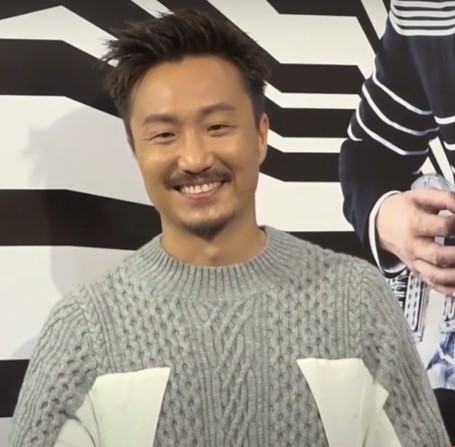
- Cheng in 2018
- Born: 9 March 1972 (age 54); British Hong Kong
- Occupations: Actor; singer; songwriter
- Years active: 1995–present
- Spouses: Charlene Choi (m. 2006; div. 2010) Sammie Yu (m. 2011; div. 2025)
- Children: 2
- Parent: Norman Cheng (father)
- Musical career
- Genres: Cantopop; Mandopop
- Instruments: Vocals; guitar
- Labels: PolyGram; Universal Music Group; Gold Typhoon Group; Sun Entertainment Culture

Chinese name
- Traditional Chinese: 鄭中基
- Simplified Chinese: 郑中基
Transcriptions
Standard Mandarin
- Hanyu Pinyin: Zhèng Zhōngjī
Yue: Cantonese
- Jyutping: Zeng6 Zung1gei1

Ronald Cheng Chung-kei (born 9 March 1972) is a Hong Kong actor, singer and songwriter.

== Life and career ==
Ronald Cheng was born in Hong Kong. Originally intending to work behind the scenes as a songwriter and a producer, Cheng did odd jobs at his father (Director of EMI Asia)'s company EMI— which included doing backing vocalist for the likes of Alan Tam and Priscilla Chan — during summers as a youth. The lessons were apparently effective, as producers started taking notice of Cheng's voice and he was signed to a recording contract soon thereafter. Cheng first shot to popularity in Taiwan before returning home and enjoying some success in Hong Kong. However, his singing career went into a lull from 2000 to 2003 due to the infamous "air rage incident", when, on a flight from Los Angeles to Taipei, he became drunk and had an altercation with the flight attendant and co-pilot. However, Cheng's career rebounded later.

Cheng returned to the Cantopop market in 2003, however success for him did not arrive until 2005, where his signature song "無賴" (Rascal) was voted one of the Top 10 songs at various music award shows, notably TVB's Jade Solid Gold, where it was voted the most popular song of 2005.

Cheng won his first Best Supporting Actor award for his performance in Vulgaria at the 32nd Hong Kong Film Award.

Cheng's song "My Only One" was awarded one of the Top 10 golden songs organized by VivTV, Chill Club, presented on 18 April 2021.

On 23 April 2021, Cheng held Hong Kong's first outdoor drive-in concert, entitled Drive in Ultra – WEE are Ronald Cheng. Many celebrities showed up to help out, including Josie Ho Chiu-yi, Ekin Cheng, Candy Lo and Kelly Chen etc.

== Personal life ==
His father, Norman Cheng (鄭東漢), is the chairperson and CEO of EMI, and formerly of the Asia Pacific division of PolyGram and then Universal Music.

Ronald Cheng started his relationship with Charlene Choi, a Hong Kong singer and actress, in 2004, after starring as lovers in the film Hidden Heroes. Their marriage was kept secret from the public, and they avoided going out together except for family gatherings. In 2010, while Choi announced ending the relationship with Cheng, the press revealed that they had registered their marriage in Los Angeles, United States in 2006. Both Cheng and Choi admitted to the marriage, but decided to divorce. Later, he dated Sammie Yu Sze-man, then a hostess in Cable TV Hong Kong, and Yu gave birth to a daughter in July 2011. They married in the same year and later had a son in 2015.

== Discography ==
- 1996
  - 左右為難 (In A Dilemma) – Mandarin Album
  - 別愛我 (Don't Love Me) – Mandarin Album
- 1997
  - 情深 (Deep Love) – Cantonese Album
  - 最愛的人不是你 (You Are Not My Dearest Lover) – Mandarin EP
  - 絕口不提！愛你 (Never Say! Love You) – Mandarin Album
  - 戒情人 (Abstain From Love) – Mandarin Album
- 1998
  - 時間 人物 地點 (Time, People, Place) – Mandarin / Cantonese New + Best Selections
  - 敵人 (Enemy) – Mandarin Album
- 1999
  - 我真的可以 (I Really Can) – Mandarin Album
  - One More Time – Cantonese Album
- 2000
  - 聲聲愛你 (Sounds Love You) – Mandarin New + Best Selections
  - 緣份無邊界 (Love Without Borderline) – Cantonese Compilation
  - 真朋友 (True Friend) – Mandarin Album
- 2002
  - Encore – Mandarin New + Best Selections
- 2003
  - 唔該， 救救我 (Please Help!!!) – Cantonese Album
  - 唔該， 救救我 "火紅火熱"版 (Please Help!!! - 2 AVCD Version) – Cantonese Album
- 2005
  - Before After – Cantonese Album
- 2006
  - 正宗K (Karaoke Cheng) – Cantonese / Mandarin New + Best Selections
  - 鄭中基演唱會二零零六 (Ronald Cheng Live in Concert 2006) – Cantonese / Mandarin Live Album
- 2008
  - 怪胎 (Freak) – Mandarin New + Best Selections

== Filmography ==
=== Film ===
Year	Title	Role	Notes
1997	A Chinese Ghost Story: The Tsui Hark Animation	Siu Lan-fu	voice only
2000	Twelve Nights	Johnny	
2001	Blue Moon	Fai	
2001	Bullets of Love	Ma	
2001	Dance of a Dream	Yip Wai-shih	
2002	Interactive Murders	JASH / Lam Wan-san	
2002	My Wife Is 18	Bruce	
2002	Market's Romance	Chicky Keung	
2003	My Lucky Star	Crab Duen / Guard Duen	
2003	Give Them a Chance	Disco triad boss	aka Give Me a Chance
2003	Dragon Loaded 2003	Dragon	
2003	Golden Chicken 2	Mr. Chan	
2004	Super Model	Mandam Fung Yan-bing	
2004	Hidden Heroes	Ho Yoiji	
2004	My Sweetie	owner of Lo's office lift	cameo
2005	Himalaya Singh	Singh	
2005	Dragon Reloaded	Dragon	
2006	McDull, the Alumni	marketing head / musical instruments sal	
2006	Undercover Hidden Dragon	Fat Chai (Sunny Sun) / Wind To	
2006	Fatal Contact	Captain Chan Shing	
2006	Mr. 3 Minutes	Scott Chung	
2007	It's a Wonderful Life	Thunder God / Ray Ban	also director and writer
2007	Dancing Lion	lion dancer	
2007	Mr. Cinema	Zhou Chong	
2007	Ratatouille	Remy (voice, HK version)	
2008	La Lingerie	Lucas	
2008	Legendary Assassin	Uncle Zhi	aka Wolf Fang
2009	All's Well, Ends Well 2009	Yu Bo	
2009	Kung Fu Cyborg	Xiao Jiang	aka Kungfu Cyborg: Metallic Attraction
2010	All's Well, Ends Well 2010	General Mak Bing-wing	
2010	Just Another Pandora's Box	Qing Yise / Zhao Yun / Zhang Ziyi's transvestite	
2011	All's Well, Ends Well 2011	Delivery Boy	
2011	Treasure Hunt		
2012	All's Well, Ends Well 2012		
2012	Marry a Perfect Man		
2012	The Four		
2012	Vulgaria		
2012	McDull – Pork of Music		
2012	Love Is... Pyjamas		
2013	Hotel Deluxe	OK Pao	
2013	Princess and the Seven Kung Fu Masters		
2013	Special ID	Captain Cheung	
2013	The Four II		
2014	Hello Babies	Scallop	
2014	Golden Chicken 3		
2014	Just Another Margin	Shi Wen-Sheng	
2014	The Truth About Beauty		
2014	The Four III		
2014	Sifu vs Vampire	Nicky	
2014	The Seventh Lie	Bellhop	
2014	Grey Met Shrek		
2015	Full Strike	Ng Kau-cheung	
2015	Undercover Duet	Dream Dragon	
TBA	Secret Treasure		also director
2016	House of Wolves	Fung Yan-ping	
2017	Two Wrongs Make a Right	Ximen Ding	
2018	Concerto of the Bully		
2018	Agent Mr Chan	Hung Chow	
2019	Atonement		
2019	Elisa's Day		
2022	Chilli Laugh Story		
2023	Over My Dead Body	Bear Cheung	
2023	Time Still Turns the Pages	Cheng Chi-hung	
2024	Love Lies	Arthur Fung	

=== Television series ===
Year	Title	Role	Notes
2000	The Sky is the Limit		
2001	Colourful Life	Ching Chi-yung	
2002	Slim Chances	So Bing-man	
2003	Virtues of Harmony II	Chiu Choi	guest star
2019	Haters Gonna Stay		guest star
2020	Single Papa	Lam Sai-wing	Main Role

=== Music video appearances ===
Year	Title
2021	Anson Lo - "Megahit"

== Awards and nominations ==
=== Film & TV ===
Year	Award	Category	Nominated work	Result
2001	TVB Anniversary Awards	Favorite Partners	Ronald Cheng, Cutie Mui	Nominated
2002	TVB Anniversary Awards	Best Actor	Slim Chances	Nominated
2002	TVB Anniversary Awards	Favorite Partners	Ronald Cheng, Fennie Yuen	Nominated
2002	TVB Anniversary Awards	Favorite Partners	Ronald Cheng, Candy Lo	Nominated
2002	TVB Anniversary Awards	Favorite Partners	Louis Yuen, Ronald Cheng, Remus Choy	Nominated
2004	23rd Hong Kong Film Awards	Best Supporting Actor	My Lucky Star	Nominated
2006	25th Hong Kong Film Awards	Best Original Film Song	Dragon Reloaded	Nominated
2006	25th Hong Kong Film Awards	Best Host	Beautiful Cooking	Nominated
2008	27th Hong Kong Film Awards	Best Supporting Actor	Mr. Cinema	Nominated
2008	27th Hong Kong Film Awards	Best Original Film Song	Mr. Cinema	Nominated
2009	TVB Anniversary Awards	Best Host	Ronald Cheng, Edmond Leung, Alex Fong Lik-Sun	Nominated
2012	49th Golden Horse Awards	Best Supporting Actor	Vulgaria	Won
2012	BQ Celebrity Score Awards	Favorite Actor		Nominated
2012	BQ Celebrity Score Awards	Best Singer		Nominated
2013	32nd Hong Kong Film Awards	Best Supporting Actor	Vulgaria	Won
2013	BQ Celebrity Score Awards	Best Singer		Nominated
2013	BQ Celebrity Score Awards	Favorite Actor		Nominated

=== Music ===
Year	Award	Category	Nominated work	Result
1996	Jade Solid Gold Best Ten Music Awards	Favorite New Singer		Won
1997	Jade Solid Gold Best Ten Music Awards	Best Music Video		Won
1997	CMA Chinese Music Awards	Top 20 Songs		Won
1997	CMA Chinese Music Awards	Best New Singer		Won
1998	CMA Chinese Music Awards	Top 20 Songs	Creating Romance	Won
1998	CMA Chinese Music Awards	Top 20 Songs	Never Say! Love You	Won
1998	Jade Solid Gold Best Ten Music Awards	Favorite Group Song	Jacky Cheung, Andy Hui, Ronald Cheng	Won
1999	CMA Chinese Music Awards	Top 20 Songs		Won
2000	CMA Chinese Music Awards	Top 20 Songs		Won
2002	Jade Solid Gold Best Ten Music Awards	Favorite Duet Song	Ronald Cheng, Patrick Tang	Won
2003	TVB8 Mandarin Music Awards	Best Duet Song	Ronald Cheng, Hu Yanbin	Won
2003	RTHK Top 10 Gold Songs Awards	Leaping Singer		Won
2003	Jade Solid Gold Best Ten Music Award	Favorite Singer-Songwriter		Won
2004	China Original Music Chart	Best Song		Won
2005	RTHK Top 10 Gold Songs Awards	Top 10 Songs		Won
2005	Jade Solid Gold Best Ten Music Awards	Top 10 Songs		Won
2005	Jade Solid Gold Best Ten Music Awards	Gold Song		Won
2006	China Original Music Chart	Favorite KTV		Won
2006	China Original Music Chart	Best Song		Won
2010	CMA Chinese Music Awards	Best Movie Actor		Won
