= Sad Fairy Tale =

- Directed by: Zhengchao Xu
- Starring: Cecilia Liu; Xu Zhengchao; Ryan Zuo; Iola Xie; Hu Xia
- Cinematography: Liang Cui
- Release date: September 14, 2012 (China)
- Running time: 91 minutes
- Countries: China; South Korea

Sad Fairy Tale (Chinese: 傷心童話) is a 2012 Chinese-South Korean romantic comedy film directed by Zhengchao Xu. The story is adapted from true events in the life of Wang Xiao Yi(汪小一), friend of the director.

== Summary ==
Yang Jia is harassed by her superior at work. Liu Tong, a co-worker and previous classmate of hers, loves her quietly. He never confessed to her, but he joined the company as a programmer to be close to Yang Jia. Yang Jia is aware of the support Liu Tong gives her, but she only ever confesses in the pages of her diary. Yang Jia contracts a rare disease that no one has ever recovered from. Liu Tong does all that he can to make her dreams come true, literally.

== Cast ==
- Cecilia Liu as Yang Jia
- Xu Zhengchao as Qin
- Ryan Dazuo as Yin Zhe
- Iola Xie as Yue Ling
- Hu Xia as Liu Tong
