= The Four (2008 TV series) =

2008 Hong Kong television series

- Promotional poster
- 少年四大名捕
- Genre: Wuxia; Detective fiction
- Based on: Si Da Ming Bu by Woon Swee Oan
- Written by: Anna Lee; Tsang Po-wah; Cheung Chung-chai; Ella Chan; Ziu Mei-yee; Yiu Fuk-hing; Chan Long
- Directed by: Wong Kwok-fai; Chong Kwok-keung; Kwok Wai-jing; Lee Siu-fan; Hui Shui-ping
- Starring: Raymond Lam; Ron Ng; Kenneth Ma; Sammul Chan; Kate Tsui; Selena Li; Dominic Lam
- Opening theme: "Storm" (風暴) by Raymond Lam, Ron Ng, Kenneth Ma and Sammul Chan
- Ending theme: "Storm" (風暴) by Raymond Lam, Ron Ng, Kenneth Ma and Sammul Chan
- Composers: Tang Chi-wai; Yip Siu-chung
- Country of origin: Hong Kong
- Original language: Cantonese
- No. of episodes: 25

Production
- Executive producer: Lam Chi-wah
- Producer: Lam Chi-wah
- Production locations: Hong Kong; Lijiang
- Editors: Anna Lee; Yip Sai-hong
- Camera setup: Multi camera
- Running time: ≈45 minutes per episode
- Production company: TVB

Original release
- Network: TVB Jade
- Release: 22 September – 24 October 2008

The Four (少年四大名捕) is a 2008 Hong Kong wuxia television series produced by TVB and adapted from the novel Si Da Ming Bu (四大名捕; The Four Great Constables) by Woon Swee Oan. Set in China during the Song dynasty, it follows four constables – Heartless, Iron Fist, Chaser, and Cold Blood – who work together to solve cases and bring down the corrupt premier. The series is shown to celebrate TVB's 41st anniversary.

== Cast ==
Note: Some of the characters' names are in Cantonese romanisation.

=== Main cast ===
Cast	Role	Description
Raymond Lam	Heartless (無情) / Shing Ngai-yu (成崖餘)	The leader of the four young constables. Adopted by Chukot Ching-ngor, Heartless is Chukot's first student. He specializes in making and using small weapons, such as darts and knives. Although paralysed waist down, Heartless uses a wheel chair that encases many hidden weapons. Heartless' primary role is the brains of the group, gifted with an analytical mind and brilliant deductive skills
Kenneth Ma	Iron Fist (鐵手) / Tit Yau-ha (鐵游夏) / Fok Yi (霍義)	Chukot's second student. Possessing extreme arm strength, Iron Fist specializes in fist work and boxing. He represents the humane face of the constabulary, being raised by a humble but honest blacksmith
Sammul Chan	Chaser (追命) / Chui Leuk-sheung (崔略商)	Chukot's third student and the eldest of the four young constables. With strong and fast legs, Chaser possesses great energy, specializing in leg work. A former petty criminal, he is the most streetsmart and is often assigned to do undercover assignments
Ron Ng	Cold Blood (冷血) / Lang Ling-hei (冷凌棄)	Chukot's fourth student and the youngest of the four young constables. Cold Blood is extremely talented in wielding swords. A former assassin, his life was saved by the Chief Constable, in which Cold Blood agreed to serve for one year as repayment. Raised in the wilderness, Cold Blood possesses keen senses and outdoor skills

=== Divine Constabulary ===
Cast	Role	Description
Dominic Lam	Chukot Ching-ngor 諸葛正我	Divine Constabulary Leader; The four constables' mentor
Halina Tam	Piu Suet 飄雪	Keeper of the Divine Constabulary
Martin Yeung	Kam Kim (Golden Sword) 金劍	Constable
Wu Kei-fung	Ngan Kim (Silver Sword) 銀劍	Constable
Chiu Man-tung	Pau Tau (Leopard Head) 豹頭	Constable
Hui Man-kiu	Cheung Kwai 祥貴	Constable

=== Blue Sky Sect ===
Cast	Role	Description
Gordon Liu	Lam Po-Tian 藍破天	Chief; Lam Ruo-Fei's father. Dies in Episode 14.
Selena Li	Lam Ruo-Fei 藍若飛	Lam Po-Tian's daughter. Teet Sau's Lover; Blinded in Episode 23 by Song Zhi Yin
Dai Yiu Ming	Sha Fuk 傻福	Sect disciple
Raymond Tseng	Dai Yong 大勇	Sect disciple

=== The Federation ===
Cast	Role	Description
Felix Lok	Ling Lok Shi 凌落石	Villain to Semi Villain; Chief; Ling Xiaogu and Ling Xiao-Dao's father. Killed by Ling Siu-kwat in Episode 23 under Choi King's influence and orders but only died in Episode 24
Joel Chan	Ling Siu-kwat 凌小骨	Villain; Ling Lok-Shi's son Ling Siu-Do's older brother Killed Ling Lok Shi in Episode 23 but only died in Episode 24
Cilla Kung	Ling Siu-to 凌小刀	Ling Luo Shi's daughter. Ling Xiaogu's younger sister. Loves Cold Blood. Has nothing to do with The Federation apart from blood relation.

=== Royal Court ===
Cast	Role	Description
Henry Yu	Emperor Huizong of Song (宋徽宗)	Chiu Cheung's older brother
Savio Tsang	Chiu Cheung 趙昌	Semi Villain; Emperor's younger brother Kuk Yin-Hung's husband Killed by Ling Siu-kwat in Episode 23
Kristal Tin	Kuk Yin-Hung 曲嫣紅	Chiu Cheung's wife.
Lau Kong	Choi King 蔡京	Main Villain; Prime Minister; Song Zhi-Yin's adopted father
Chiang Chi Kwong	Shu Mo-Hei 舒無戲	General; Chukot Ching-Ngor's friend.

=== Teet family ===
Cast	Role	Description
Law Lok Lam	Teet Foo 鐵斧	Iron Fist's foster father. Teet Yau-Tung's father.
Vivi Lee	Teet Yau-Tung 鐵游冬	Teet Foo's daughter. Iron Fist's stepsister.

=== Other cast ===
Cast	Role	Description
Kate Tsui	Song Zhi-Yin 桑芷妍	Villain; Doctor; Choi King's Spy; Choi King's adopted daughter Mo Ching's Lover
Suet Nei	Mama Yeung 羊大媽	Chaser's foster mother
Chun Wong	Papa Chu two 朱二爸	Chaser's foster father
Sai Hou Ying	Papa Au three 牛三爸	Chaser's foster father
Lam King Kong	Shing Ding-Tin 成鼎天	Heartless' deceased father Chukot Ching-Ngor's friend.
Lee Fung	Lang Yu-Sheung 冷如霜	Cold Blood's aunt

== Viewership ratings ==
	Week	Episode	Average Points	Peaking Points	References
1	September 22–26, 2008	1–5	30	37	
2	September 29 - October 3, 2008	6–10	28	31	
3	October 6–10, 2008	11–15	27	—	
4	October 13–16, 2008	16–19	29	—	
5	October 21–23, 2008	20–22	29	—	
5	October 24, 2008	23–24	30	35	

== Awards and nominations ==
41st TVB Anniversary Awards (2008)

- "Best Drama"
- "My Favourite Male Character Role" (Ron Ng - Lang Ling-Hei (Cold Blood))
