= The Butterfly Lovers (2008 film) =

2008 Hong Kong film by Jingle Ma

- Official promotional poster
- 武俠梁祝
- Directed by: Jingle Ma
- Written by: Chan Po-chun; Jingle Ma; Ng Ka-keung; Yeung Sin-ling; Wong Nga-man
- Based on: The Butterfly Lovers
- Produced by: Catherine Hun
- Starring: Wu Chun; Charlene Choi; Hu Ge
- Cinematography: Chan Chi-ying; Jingle Ma; Chan Kwok-hung
- Edited by: Kwong Chi-leung
- Music by: Chiu Tsang-hei; Ronald Fu
- Distributed by: Mei Ah Entertainment
- Release date: 9 October 2008
- Running time: 102 minutes
- Country: Hong Kong
- Language: Cantonese
- Box office: US$5,461,411

The Butterfly Lovers (武俠梁祝), also known as The Assassin's Blade or Jiandie (劍蝶), is a 2008 Hong Kong wuxia film directed by Jingle Ma, starring Wu Chun, Charlene Choi, and Hu Ge. The film is based on the Chinese legend of the Butterfly Lovers, but in a wuxia setting.

== Synopsis ==
Zhu Yanzhi disguises herself as a man to join the Carefree Clan and learn martial arts to protect her family. During this time, she meets Liang Zhongshan, a senior member of the clan, and starts a romance with him even though initially he does not realise she is a woman.

When Zhu returns home, she learns that her family have arranged for her to marry Ma Cheng'en, her childhood friend. After she refuses, Ma threatens to kill Liang and Zhu's parents unless she marries him. Zhu reluctantly agrees and lies to Liang that she no longer loves him, causing a heartbroken Liang to leave.

During her wedding, Zhu takes a special herb to fake her death, much to the horror of Ma and everyone present. When Liang learns that Zhu is "dead", he shows up at her funeral, wanting to take her body to bury in Butterfly Valley. Ma refuses to allow Liang to leave with Zhu's body, so the two men duel.

Liang wins the duel against Ma, but ends up being mortally wounded. Before succumbing to his injuries, he digs a grave in Butterfly Valley for her and dies while lying next to her. Zhu, who is still alive, regains consciousness and sees that Liang is dead, so she also gives in to death. When the lovers are finally buried together, a pair of butterflies on Liang's sword flutter and fly away together.

== Cast ==
- Wu Chun as Liang Zhongshan
- Charlene Choi as Zhu Yanzhi
- Hu Ge as Ma Cheng'en
- Harlem Yu as Uncle Caotou
- Xian Seli as Yinxin
- Ti Lung as Zhu Gongyuan
- Li Qinqin as Zhu Yanzhi's mother
- Shaun Tam as the Axe Gang's Boss
- Hung Yan-yan as Uncle Toutuo
- Shao Bing as General Tie
- Louis Fan as Brother Wang
- Yan Xi as the Scholar Gang's Boss
- Wan Qian and Xu Yang as the Beauty Swordswomen
