= Woon Swee Oan =

Malaysian poet

- Woon Swee Oan
- Born: Woon Liang Giok; January 1, 1954 (age 72); Bidor Town, Batang Padang District, Perak State, Federation of Malaya
- Education: National Taiwan University
- Occupations: Writer, poet
- Writing career
- Language: Chinese
- Genre: Wuxia
- Notable works: Jingyan Yi Qiang; Buyi Shenxiang; Si Da Ming Bu

Chinese name
- Traditional Chinese: 溫瑞安
- Simplified Chinese: 温瑞安
Transcriptions
Standard Mandarin
- Hanyu Pinyin: Wēn Ruìān
Hakka
- Romanization: vûn sui ôn
Yue: Cantonese
- Jyutping: Wan1 Seoi6-on1

Woon Liang Giok (birth name)
- Traditional Chinese: 溫涼玉
- Simplified Chinese: 温凉玉
Transcriptions
Standard Mandarin
- Hanyu Pinyin: Wēn Liángyù
Hakka
- Romanization: vûn liòng ngiu̍k
Yue: Cantonese
- Jyutping: Wan1 Loeng4-juk6

Woon Swee Oan (born Woon Liang Giok in January 1954) is a Hong Kong-based Malaysian poet and writer of wuxia novels. Some of his best known works include Jingyan Yi Qiang, Buyi Shenxiang, and Si Da Ming Bu, which have been adapted into television series Strike at Heart, The Four, Face to Fate, and the film The Four, among others.

== Life ==
Woon was born in Bidor Town, Batang Padang District, Perak State, Malaya in 1954 in a Hakka family with ancestry from Mei County, Guangdong Province, China. In 1959, at a young age, he started reading from his family's collection of books and wrote his first short story. In 1961, he started attending primary school, and was accompanied by his elder sister because he was shy and afraid. However, soon after entering school, he became very active and outspoken in class, and was selected as the model student of the year in 1963. Throughout his years in primary to senior high school, Woon published articles in various magazines and defeated an opponent a year older than him in a debating competition when he was in secondary two. He also wrote a romantic novel titled Ouran (偶然; By Coincidence).

Between 1971 and 1972, Woon studied psychoanalysis and aesthetics. During this time, he met Fang E'zhen (方娥真), who became his partner for 16 years. He also started writing for various Taiwanese magazines and published his debut wuxia novel in the Hong Kong magazine Wuxia Chunqiu (武俠春秋). In 1973, he established a poetry society and published his first novel in the series Si Da Ming Bu (四大名捕; The Four Great Constables). At the end of the year, he travelled to Taiwan to further his studies at the National Taiwan University.

In 1976, Woon and Fang E'zhen established the Shenzhou Poetry Society (神州詩社) in Taiwan. However, not long later, they were accused of "promoting communism" by the Taiwanese government and detained for three months; the society was disbanded. They were sent back to Malaysia later, but were subsequently forced to move to Hong Kong due to the Malaysian government's strong stance against communism.

In 1981, after moving to Hong Kong, Woon published the wuxia novel series Shenzhou Qixia (神州奇俠; Hero of Shenzhou) in the newspaper Ming Pao. In the second half of 1983, ATV recruited Woon to be one of their writers. In the same year, Woon's works were published by Bok Yik (博益), a sub-company under TVB. His wuxia novels were later re-released by a Taiwanese publisher, Wansheng (萬盛). Woon's novel series Si Da Ming Bu and Buyi Shenxiang (布衣神相) were also adapted by ATV into television series.

In 1988, Taiwan's CTV released a television series based on Woon's novel series Si Da Ming Bu. Woon also wrote wuxia serials in the Taiwanese newspapers China Times and United Daily News. At the end of the year, Woon started his own magazine company in Hong Kong to promote his "new school" of wuxia stories. From 1990 to 1998, Woon ventured into the mainland Chinese market and spent most of his time in China. His most recent works such as Da Laohu (打老虎), Bu Laoshu (捕老鼠) and Yuanhou Yue (猿猴月) were published by Crown House Publishing (皇冠出版社) in Hong Kong.

== List of works ==
- Si Da Ming Bu series (四大名捕系列)
  - Si Da Ming Bu Hui Jingshi (四大名捕會京師)
  - Si Da Ming Bu Da Duijue (四大名捕大對決)
  - Si Da Ming Bu Chao Xin Pai (四大名捕超新派)
  - Si Da Ming Bu Da Laohu (四大名捕打老虎)
  - Si Da Ming Bu Zhen Guandong (四大名捕震關東)
  - Si Da Ming Bu Zhan Tianwang (四大名捕戰天王)
  - Nishui Han (逆水寒)
- Buyi Shenxiang series (布衣神相系列)
  - Sharen De Xintiao (殺人的心跳)
  - Yemengse (葉夢色)
  - Tianwei (天威)
  - Laiyao'er (賴藥兒)
  - Luohua Jianying (落花劍影)
  - Daoba Ji (刀巴記)
- Shenzhou Qixia series (神州奇俠系列)
  - Shenzhou Qixia (神州奇俠)
    - Jianqi Changjiang (劍氣長江)
    - Liangguang Haojie (兩廣豪傑)
    - Jiangshan Ruhua (江山如畫)
    - Yingxiong Haohan (英雄好漢)
    - Chuangdang Jianghu (闖蕩江湖)
    - Shenzhou Wudi (神州無敵)
    - Jimo Gaoshou (寂寞高手)
    - Tianxia Youxue (天下有雪)
  - Xuehe Che (血河車)
    - Da Zongshi (大宗師)
    - Xiaoyao You (逍遙遊)
    - Yangsheng Zhu (養生主)
    - Ren Shijian (人世間)
  - Daxia Chuanqi (大俠傳奇)
  - Tangfang Yizhan (唐方一戰)
- Shuo Yingxiong, Shei Shi Yingxiong series (說英雄, 誰是英雄系列)
  - Wenrou De Dao (溫柔的刀)
  - Yinu Bajian (一怒拔劍)
  - Jingyan Yi Qiang (驚艷一槍)
  - Shangxin Xiaojian (傷心小箭)
  - Chaotian Yigun (朝天一棍)
  - Qunlong Zhi Shou (群龍之首)
  - Tianxia Youdi (天下有敵)
  - Tianxia Wudi (天下無敵)
  - Tianxia Diyi (天下第一)
  - Tiandi (天敵)
- Xiandai series (現代系列)
  - Sha Le Ni Hao Ma? (殺了你好嗎?)
  - Qing Jie Furen Yiyong (請借夫人一用)
  - Qing Ni Dongshou Wan Yidian (請你動手晚一點)
  - Zhanseng Yu He Ping (戰僧與何平)
  - Da Bu Liang De Dahuoji (打不亮的打火機)
  - Sharen Zhe Tang Zhan (殺人者唐斬)
  - Zao Hen (鑿痕)
- Dao (刀)
- Zha (詐)
- Rufang (乳房)
- Shaqin (殺親)
- Jieju (結局)
- Duanliao (斷了)
- Liaoduan (了斷)
- Jidao (祭刀)
- Da Cisha (大刺殺)
- Xijiang Yue (西江月)
- Xue Zai Shao (雪在燒)
- Nü Shenbu (女神捕)
- Mishen Yin (迷神引)
- Luoye Xinya (落葉新芽)
- Tanzhi Xiangsi (彈指相思)
- Shashou Shanzai (殺手善哉)
- Renxing Lian'ou (人形蓮藕)
- Mashang Shangma (馬上上馬)
- Zhulian De Suiyue (豬臉的歲月)
- Shashou De Cibei (殺手的慈悲)
- Wanshang De Xiaoshi (晚上的消失)
- Aoman Yu Pian Jian (傲慢雨偏劍)
- Aishang Ta De Heshang (愛上她的和尚)
- Aishang Heshang De Ta (愛上和尚的她)
- Juedui Buyao Rewo (絕對不要惹我)
- Laoge, Jietou Yiyong (老哥, 借頭一用)
- Qing, Qingqing, Qingqingqing (請, 請請, 請請請)
- Pengyou, Ni Si Guo Wei? (朋友, 你死過未？)
- Xihuan Yanse De Mentu (喜歡顏色的門徒)
- Shiqu Shetou Le Ma? (失去舌頭了嗎？)
- Sha Chu (殺楚)
- Qi Sha (七殺)
- Jin Xue (金血)
- Xia Shao (俠少)
- Daming Wang (達明王)
- Jinxiu Renpi (錦繡人皮)
- Jianghu Xianhua (江湖閑話)
- Tunhuo Qinghuai (吞火情懷)
- Luanshi Qinghuai (亂世情懷)
- Luori Daqi (落日大旗)
- Jiangjun De Jianfa (將軍的劍法)
- Daocong Li De Shi (刀叢裡的詩)
- Qi Da Kou series (七大寇系列)
- Jin Zhi Xiazhe series (今之俠者系列)
- Hongdian Lanya series (紅電藍牙系列)
- Baiyi Fang Zhen Mei series (白衣方振眉系列)

== Adaptations ==
- Return of the Bastard Swordsman (1984)
- The Undercover Agents (ATV, 1984)
- The Assassin (1993)
- Four Marshals (2003)
- Treacherous Waters (2004)
- Musketeer and Princess (2004)
- The Four Detective Guards (2004)
- Strike at Heart (2005)
- Face to Fate (2006)
- The Four (TVB, 2008)
- The Four (film) Trilogy (2012-2014)
- The Four (2015) (Hunan TV, 2015)
- Heroes (2021)
- Ni Shui Han (TBA)
