= List of Hong Kong films of 2005 =

This article lists feature-length Hong Kong films released in 2005:

== Box office ==
The highest-grossing Hong Kong films released in 2005 by domestic box office gross revenue, are as follows:

Highest-grossing films released in 2005
Rank	Title	Domestic gross
1	Initial D	HK$37,862,364
2	Wait 'til You're Older	HK$20,163,545
3	The Myth	HK$17,062,608
4	Dragon Reloaded	HK$15,905,137
5	Election	HK$15,895,622
6	Himalaya Singh	HK$15,603,530
7	Perhaps Love	HK$14,218,402
8	Drink-Drank-Drunk	HK$11,987,277
9	All About Love	HK$11,694,770
10	House of Fury	HK$10,992,862

== Releases ==
Title	Director	Cast	Genre	Release
2 Young	Derek Yee	Jaycee Chan, Fiona Sit	Drama, romantic comedy	15 April
A Chinese Tall Story	Jeffrey Lau	Nicholas Tse, Charlene Choi, Fan Bingbing, Wilson Chen, Kenny Kwan, Steven Cheung	Adventure, fantasy	22 December
A Side, B Side, Seaside	Chan Wing Chiu			
A Wondrous Bet				
About Love	Shimoyama Ten, Yee Chih-yen, Zhang Yibai	Chen Bolin, Mavis Fan, Yui Ichikawa, Misaki Ito	Romance	12 April
All About Love	Lee Kung Lok, Daniel Yu Wai Kwok	Andy Lau, Charlie Yeung, Charlene Choi	Romance	20 October
A.V.	Pang Ho-Cheung	Wong You Nam, Lawrence Chou, Derek Tsang, Chui Tien-you, Yan Ng	Comedy	19 March
b420	Mathew Tang	Ben Hung, Sam Lee, Miki Yeung	Comedy drama	17 November
Banquet at Hongmen	Li Ji Qiang, Lin Luo Ping, Wei Han Tao			
Basic Interests				
Bug Me Not!	Law Chi-Leung	Isabella Leong, Wilson Chen	Fantasy, romance	21 July
China's Next Top Princess	Steve Cheng			
Colour of Loyalty	Billy Chung			
Crazy N' the City	James Yuen, Cheuk Lanbo	Francis Ng, Eason Chan, Joey Yung		
Curse of Lola	Li Hong			
Demoniac Flash				
Divergence	Benny Chan	Aaron Kwok, Ekin Cheng, Daniel Wu	Action, crime	28 April
DragonBlade: The Legend of Lang	Antony Szeto	Karen Mok, Daniel Wu, Stephen Fung, Sandra Ng	Action, animated, fantasy	6 January
Dragon Reloaded	Vincent Kok	Ronald Cheng, Sam Lee, Cheung Tat-Ming		
Dragon Squad	Daniel Lee	Vanness Wu, Shawn Yue, Xia Yu, Eva Huang, Lawrence Chou, Sammo Hung, Maggie Q	Action	10 November
Drink-Drank-Drunk	Derek Yee	Miriam Yeung, Daniel Wu, Alex Fong	Comedy, romance	18 August
Election	Johnnie To	Simon Yam, Tony Leung Ka-fai, Louis Koo	Crime	20 October
Embrace Your Shadow	Joe Ma	Fiona Sit, Dylan Kuo, Cheung Kwok-Keung, Chung Ching-Yu, Samuel Pang	Drama, romance	15 November
Everlasting Regret	Stanley Kwan	Sammi Cheng, Tony Leung Ka-Fai		
Fear of Intimacy				
Feng Liu Cai Zi Qiao Jia Ren				
Fifth of May				
Futago				
Game with a Rich Lady				
Gimme Kudos				
Hands in the Hair	Jiang Cheng	Rosamund Kwan, Wallace Huo, Francis Ng	Romance	7 March
Himalaya Singh	Wai Ka-fai	Sean Lau, Ronald Cheng, Francis Ng, Cherrie Ying, Gauri Karnik	Comedy	3 February
Home Sweet Home	Cheang Pou-Soi	Karena Lam, Shu Qi, Alex Fong, Lam Suet	Horror	27 October
House of Fury	Stephen Fung	Anthony Wong, Michael Wong, Gillian Chung	Comedy, martial arts	24 March
Initial D	Alan Mak, Andrew Lau	Jay Chou, Anne Suzuki, Edison Chen, Anthony Wong, Shawn Yue, Chapman To, Jordan Chan, Kenny Bee	Action	23 June
It Had to Be You!	Maurice Li, Andrew Loo	Ekin Cheng, Karena Lam, Eric Tsang	Romantic comedy	4 March
Kung Fu Mahjong	Wong Jing, Billy Chung	Yuen Wah, Yuen Qiu, Roger Kwok	Comedy	2 June
Kung Fu Mahjong 2	Wong Jing	Cherrie Ying, Yuen Wah, Yuen Qiu		
Legend of the Dragon				
Mob Sister	Wong Ching-Po	Annie Liu, Karena Lam, Simon Yam, Anthony Wong, Eric Tsang	Action	4 August
Moonlight in Tokyo	Felix Chong, Alan Mak	Leon Lai, Chapman To		
New The Kingdom And The Beauty				
Perhaps Love	Peter Chan	Takeshi Kaneshiro, Jacky Cheung, Zhou Xun	Musical	8 December
PTU File - Death Trap				
Seoul Raiders	Jingle Ma	Tony Leung Chiu-wai, Richie Jen, Shu Qi	Action	5 February
Set to Kill				
Set Up	Billy Chung	Christy Chung, Michael Tse, Roy Cheung	Horror	2 June
Seven Swords	Tsui Hark	Donnie Yen, Leon Lai, Charlie Yeung, Sun Honglei, Lu Yi, Kim So-yeon	Wuxia	29 July
Slim till Dead	Marco Mak, Wong Jing	Anthony Wong, Cherrie Ying		
Song Song & Little Cat	John Woo	Jiang Wenli, Zhao Zhicun		1 September
SPL: Sha Po Lang	Wilson Yip	Donnie Yen, Simon Yam, Sammo Hung	Action	18 November
The Cherries Are Red				
The Days of Noah				
The Eye 10	The Pang Brothers	Chen Bolin, Kate Yeung, Isabella Leong, Bongkoj Khongmalai, Ray MacDonald, Kris Gu	Horror	25 March
The Heirloom				
The House				
The Impotent King				
The Myth	Stanley Tong	Jackie Chan, Kim Hee-sun, Tony Leung Ka-fai, Mallika Sherawat	Adventure, fantasy, martial arts	11 May
The Unusual Youth	Dennis Law	Race Wong, Yan Ng, Marco Lok, Raymond Wong Ho-yin	Comedy-drama, teen	19 May
Wait 'til You're Older	Teddy Chan	Andy Lau, Karen Mok, Felix Wong	Comedy	
Where Is Mama's Boy				
