= Boy'z =

Hong Kong boy band

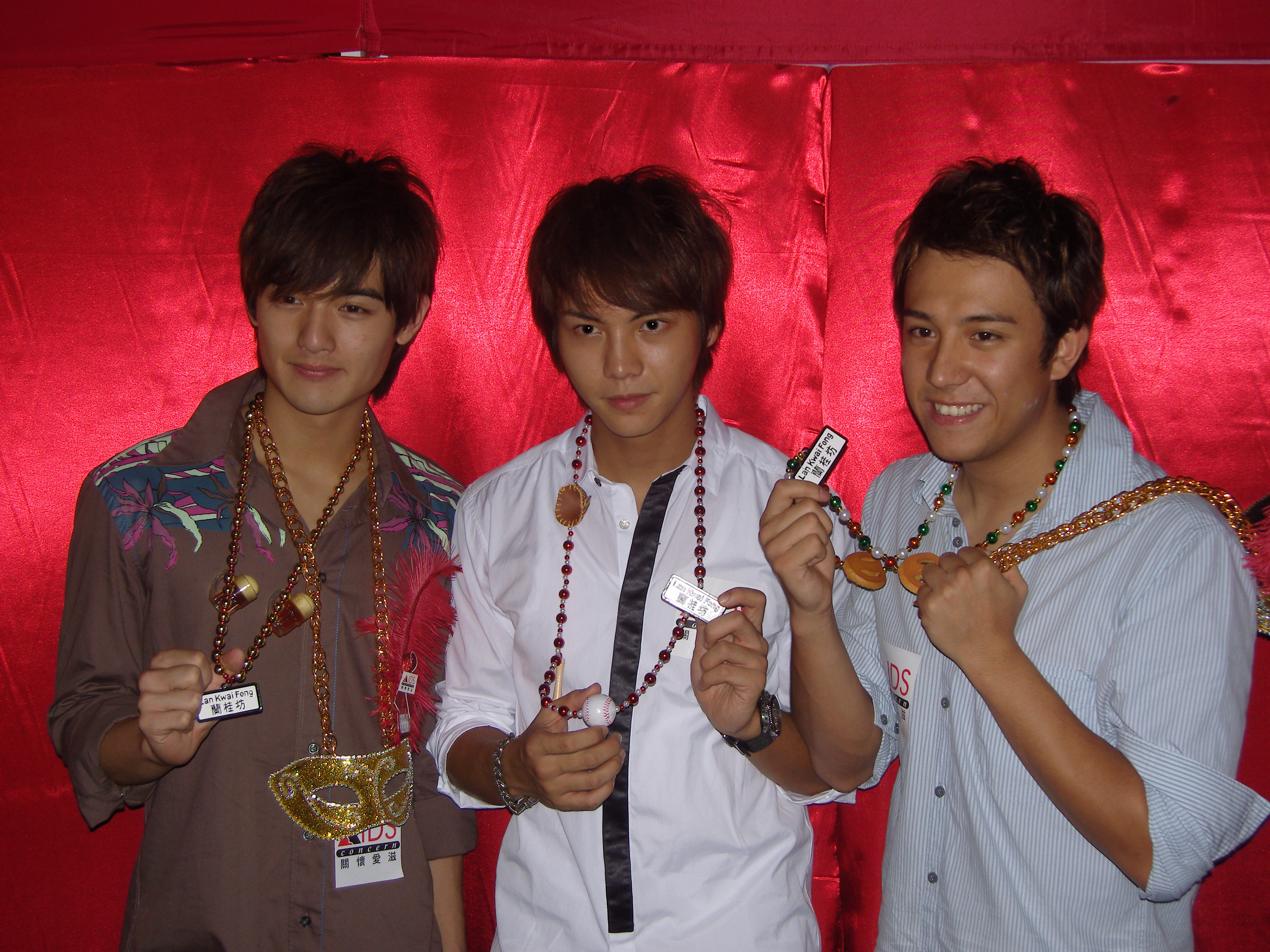
- Mak, Chan and Cheung in 2007 in Lan Kwai Fong, Hong Kong
- Years active: 2002–present
- Musical career
- Also known as: Sun Boy'z
- Origin: Hong Kong
- Genres: Cantopop, Mandopop
- Label: Emperor Entertainment Group
- Members: Kenny Kwan; Steven Cheung
- Past members: Dennis Mak; William Chan

Boy'z was a Hong Kong Cantopop duo launched in 2002 by EEG. It originally consisted of Kenny Kwan and Steven Cheung. Kwan left the group in 2005, and was replaced with Dennis Mak in 2005. In 2006, William Chan joined the group, forming the trio Sun Boy'z. The trio disbanded in 2008, but Kwan and Cheung came back together as a duo in 2010.

== History ==
=== 2002–2005: Boy'z ===
Boy'z was formerly a Hong Kong Cantopop duo that consisted of members Kenny Kwan (關智斌) (born 30 December 1980) and Steven Cheung (張致恆) (born 10 November 1984). The duo was formed around June 2002 by the Emperor Entertainment Group as the male version a year after the female Cantopop duo Twins was formed. Boy'z has released 3 EPs and two albums. Their debut EP, La La 世界 (La La World), was released in 2003.

They were based on another Hong Kong popular prefabricated duo, Twins, who was also formed by Emperor Entertainment Group. Boy'z received main roles in films such as The Death Curse (2003) and PaPa Loves You (2004). They were cameos as robbers in Jackie Chan's film New Police Story (2004). As their popularity grew, Boy'z gained starring roles in the film 6:00 AM (2004).

On 13 January 2005, it was announced that Boy'z would be splitting and disband as early plans and Kenny Kwan would continue his career as a solo artist. In February 2005, Dennis Mak (麥子豪, born 7 May 1987), top 5 finalist of the EEG Singing Contest 2004, who was originally planned to have a solo career, will continue Boy'z with Steven Cheung. The duo's popularity went down after Kenny left, mainly because they have not released any recorded material since then. Dennis and Steven were arranged to train in dancing and gymnastics. Then, they were spotted by a management company in Japan and wanted to sign them but their manager did not release them.

=== 2006–2009: Sun Boy'z ===
On 26 June 2006, winner of 2003 International Chinese New Talent Singing Championship – Hong Kong Regional Finals, William Chan (陳偉霆, born 21 November 1985) joined the group and Boy'z was eventually renamed as Sun Boy'z. They released their first single called "Tic Tac Toe" shortly before June 2006, from their self-titled debut EP. This EP included the song "拜金小姐" which was sung and performed by only Dennis and Steven because the song was recorded prior to William joining the group. Therefore, the Mandarin version of this song, "好時代", had William on lead vocals completely. The group made a sudden street performance on 3 September 2006.

In early 2007, Sun Boy'z recorded the cover version of the song "Little Wonders" by Rob Thomas called "由夢開始" for the Hong Kong version of "Meet The Robinsons". On 2 January 2007, the group released a new music video and song "3+1=1". The song features former member Kenny Kwan and the title's meaning is referring to the four of them always being together as one, even though Kenny is no longer a member of the group. This song is on their greatest hits album All For 1, released on 22 March 2007. The album includes the best of Boy'z and Sun Boy'z songs along with 3 new songs. After having success in the cantopop music scene, their record company EEG decided to have them turn to mandopop and a new Mandarin album titled 初次約會 (First Date) was released on 17 December 2007. They have been promoting the new album in the Guangzhou and other parts of China since the release of the new album.

Their duet song "大不了 (No Big Deal)", along with a music video they recorded alongside labelmate Yumiko Cheng, was released on 1 February 2008 in Yumiko's album titled 超模 (Super Model). As Boy'z with Steven and Dennis, they had recorded about 3 unreleased songs, one of the songs is "拜金小姐" which they had performed live on several occasions. And as Sun Boy'z, they have released one self-titled EP and two albums up to date since 2006 with the newest album being a Mandarin album focusing on their Mandarin speaking fans.

They had done 3 advertisements, had a cameo in the film McDull, The Alumni (2006) and main roles in The Haunted School (2007). On 14 August 2006, a 45-minute-long music video titled Say Goodbye...Luisa from Isabella Leong's album Say Goodbye...Luisa (雪 再見) was released starring Isabella Leong and Steven Cheung while William Chan only had a guest appearance.

In 2008, William Chan left Sun Boy'z to pursue a solo career. After Chan's departure, Sun Boy'z became a cantopop duo with only Steven Cheung and Dennis Mak. It was officially confirmed in December 2008 that Sun Boy'z will disband with Dennis Mak leaving the entertainment industry. The reason to this decision is because he has decided to study Hotel Management in Switzerland. In the meantime, Steven Cheung, William Chan and Kenny Kwan would continue to pursue their careers as solo artists.

=== 2010–present: Boy'z reunion ===
In 2010, Boy'z (Kenny Kwan and Steven Cheung) appeared on stage together in EEG 10th Anniversary Concert. In 2011, they released a new single together titled "Ready to Go".

== Discography ==
2003

- La La World (La La 世界) (EP)
- Hurray (一起喝采) (EP)
- A Year to Remember (EP)

2004

- Boy'Zone (Boy'Zone 男生圍)
- Boy'z Can Cook

2006

- Sun Boy'z (AVEP)

2007

- All for 1 (Sun Boy'z & Boy'z New + Best Selection)
- First Date (初次約會)

2011

- Ready to Go (single)

== Concert tours ==
In September 2007, Sun Boy'z went on a North America tour with Twins and several concerts were held in a few different states in addition to Canada. During their appearance as guests at the concerts, Sun Boy'z sang a few of their songs and they were 步步進逼, Hey You, and 死性不改 which was an old Boy'z song that they performed with Twins.

== Cover songs ==
All of Sun Boy'z songs are Cantonese or Mandarin cover version of foreign songs except for the song "Left Right", which was written by Louis Cheung.

- Tic Tac Toe (Tic Tac Toe by Buga Kingz)
- Hey You/愛你 (Hey U by Lemon Tree)
- 衝浪男孩 (Oh La Nor...My Love by Bird Thongchai)
- My Lady (Baby's Talk)
- 3+1=1/陽光下 (Precious One by KAT-TUN)
- 步步進逼/陷阱 (Work It [Everybody] by Gerard Marti)
- 由夢開始 (Little Wonders by Rob Thomas)
- 初次約會 (예쁘잖아 by Shinhwa)

== Filmography ==
=== Movies ===
Year	Film	Role
2003	The Death Curse (古宅心慌慌)	Supporting
2004	PaPa Loves You (這個亞爸真爆炸)	Supporting
2004	Fantasia (鬼馬狂想曲)	Cameo appearance
2004	New Police Story (新警察故事)	Cameo appearance
2004	6 AM (大無謂)	Lead
2005	Bug Me Not! (蟲不知)	Supporting
2005	A Chinese Tall Story (情癲大聖)	Supporting
2006	McDull, the Alumni (春田花花同學會)	Cameo appearance
2007	The Haunted School (校墓處)	Lead

=== Television ===
- 2003
  - All About Boy'z (一起喝采)
  - Hearts of Fencing (當四葉草碰上劍尖時) (cameo)
- 2004
  - Kung Fu Soccer (功夫足球)
  - Hearts of Fencing II – Sunshine Heartbeat (赤沙印記@四葉草2) (cameo)
