= All About Boy'z =

- Genre: Comedy; Romance; Drama; Teenage life; Fantasy
- Country of origin: Hong Kong
- No. of episodes: 10

All About Boy'z is a Hong Kong television series released in the year of 2003. The series reboots the story of the 1980 Hong Kong film Encore (喝采)

== Characters ==
=== Main characters ===
- Kenny - A kind-hearted, generous young man. His dream is to become a musician through his own ability. Played by Kenny Kwan.
- Steven - A childish yet carefree and wealthy young man. He gave up his wealthy life to pursue his dream of becoming an international basketball player. Played by Steven Cheung.
- Monique - A wealthy and kind-hearted young woman. She falls in love with Kenny the first time they meet. Played by Mandy Chiang.
- Ho-Lam - A boyish and strong-willed young woman. She initially despised Steven for his wealth and ignorance the outside life, but changed her mind after she was moved by his attempts to win her heart. Played by Koey Wong.

=== Recurring characters ===
- Master Ying - The owner of a sushi restaurant. He went to Japan at a young age to become a sushi chef, and now carries the nickname The Hand of the Sun. Played by Cheung Tat-Ming.
- Tina - A wealthy girl from Steven's past. She fell in love with Master Ying after tasting his food. Played by Gillian Chung.
- Stephanie - A beautiful girl from Steven and Kenny's past. She was a cheerleading leader when she was in high school. Both boys tried to win over, but she stayed with her boyfriend "O.K." and moved to America after graduation, but came back after O.K. broke her heart. Played by Yumiko Cheng.
- Ricky - Kenny and Steven's co-worker.
- Martin - Kenny and Steven's co-worker. Played by Deep Ng.
- Mui Tao - Steven's butler.
- Money, Kenny's sister
- Kenny's brother
- Steven's father - Played by Dennis Chan.
- Monique's Aunt - Played by Josie Ho.

=== Guest characters ===
- Lau Cheung Fat - A 30-year-old man whom Kenny and Steven met when they fell into the ocean and woke up in his island. Played by Eason Chan.
- Kimmy - Played by Kristy Yeung.
- Kammy
- Big Brother Chong, Steven's brother
- Ah Ho - Played by David Lee.
- Ah Fan - Played by Maggie Lau.
- OK - Played by Zack Koo.
- Princess Long-Long - Played by Charlene Choi.
