= 25th Hong Kong Film Awards =

2006 Hong Kong Film Awards

- Date: 8 April 2006
- Site: Hong Kong Coliseum
- Hosted by: Eric Tsang; Teresa Mo; Chapman To

The 25th Hong Kong Film Awards ceremony was held on 8 April 2006 in the Hong Kong Coliseum and hosted by Eric Tsang, Teresa Mo and Chapman To. Twenty-five winners in nineteen categories were unveiled, with film Election being the year's biggest winner.

== Awards ==
Winners are listed first, highlighted in boldface, and indicated with a double dagger (‡).

**Best Film**: **Election**‡; Seven Swords; Perhaps Love; The Myth; Initial D	**Best Director**: **Johnnie To — Election**‡; Tsui Hark — Seven Swords; Peter Chan — Perhaps Love; Derek Yee — 2 Young; Andrew Lau and Alan Mak — Initial D
**Best Screenplay**: **Yau Nai-Hoi and Yip Tin-Shing — Election**‡; Aubrey Lam and Raymond To — Perhaps Love; Derek Yee and Chun Tin-Nam — 2 Young; James Yuen, Jessica Fong and Lo Yiu-Fai — Crazy N' the City; Cheung Chi-Kwong and Susan Chan — Wait 'Til You're Older	**Best Actor**: **Tony Leung Ka Fai — Election**‡; Aaron Kwok — Divergence; Tony Leung Ka Fai — Everlasting Regret; Andy Lau — Wait 'Til You're Older; Simon Yam — Election
**Best Actress**: **Zhou Xun — Perhaps Love**‡; Karena Lam — Home Sweet Home; Sammi Cheng — Everlasting Regret; Sylvia Chang — Rice Rhapsody; Karen Mok — Wait 'Til You're Older	**Best Supporting Actor**: **Anthony Wong — Initial D**‡; Alex Fong — Drink-Drank-Drunk; Hu Jun — Everlasting Regret; Liu Kai-chi — SPL; Wong Tin-lam — Election
**Best Supporting Actress**: **Teresa Mo — 2 Young**‡; Zhang Jingchu — Seven Swords; Su Yan — Everlasting Regret; Karena Lam — Ah Sou; Maggie Shiu — Election	**Best New Performer**: **Jay Chou — Initial D**‡; Fiona Sit — 2 Young; Isabella Leong — Bug Me Not!; Annie Liu — Ah Sou; Michelle Ye — Moonlight in Tokyo
**Best Cinematography**: **Peter Pau — Perhaps Love**‡; Venus Keung — Seven Swords; Peter Pau — The Promise; Cheng Siu-Keung — Election; Andrew Lau, Lai Yiu Fai and Ng Man-Ching — Initial D	**Best Film Editing**: **Yau Chi-Wai — Divergence**‡; Angie Lam — Seven Swords; Wenders Li and Eric Kwong — Perhaps Love; Patrick Tam — Election; Wong Hoi — Initial D
**Best Art Direction**: **Kenneth Yee and Pater Wong — Perhaps Love**‡; Eddy Wong — Seven Swords; William Chang and Alfred Yau — Everlasting Regret; Bill Lui — A Chinese Tall Story; Timmy Yip — The Promise	**Best Costume Make Up Design**: **Kenneth Yee and Pater Wong — Perhaps Love**‡; Poon Wing-Yan and Shirley Chan — Seven Swords; William Chang — Everlasting Regret; William Chang, Bruce Yu and Lee Pik-Kwan — A Chinese Tall Story; Timmy Yip and Kimiya Masago — The Promise
**Best Action Choreography**: **Donnie Yen — SPL**‡; Lau Kar-leung, Stephen Tung and Xiong Xinxin — Seven Swords; Lee Chung-Chi — Divergence; Jackie Chan, Stanley Tong and Richard Hung — The Myth; Yuen Wo-ping, Yuen Shun-Yi and Ku Huen-Chiu — House of Fury	**Best Original Film Score**: **Peter Kam and Leon Ko — Perhaps Love**‡; Kenji Kawai — Seven Swords; Joe Hisaishi — A Chinese Tall Story; Lo Tayu — Election; Chan Kwong-Wing — Initial D
**Best Original Film Song**: **Perhaps Love — Perhaps Love**‡; Composer: Peter Kam; Lyricist: Yiu Him; Singer: Jacky Cheung; Endless Love — The Myth; Composer: Choi Jun-young; Lyricist: Choi Jun-young and Wang Zhongyan; Singer: Jackie Chan and Kim Hee-sun; 下次不敢 — Wait 'Til You're Older; Composer: Peter Kam; Lyricist: Andy Lau; Singer: Andy Lau; Drifting — Initial D; Composer: Jay Chou; Lyricist: Vincent Fang; Singer: Jay Chou; 無賴 — Dragon Reloaded; Composer: Joe Lei; Lyricist: Joe Lei; Singer: Ronald Cheng	**Best Sound Design**: **Kinson Tsang — Initial D**‡; Steve Burgess and He Wei — Seven Swords; Kinson Tsang — Perhaps Love; Eddy Wong and Victor Wong — A Chinese Tall Story; Wang Danrong and Roger Savage — The Promise
**Best Visual Effects**: **Eddy Wong, Victor Wong** **and Bryan Cheung — Initial D**‡; Peter Webb — Seven Swords; Wendy Choi and David Tso — The Myth; Eddy Wong and Victor Wong — A Chinese Tall Story; Frankie Chung, Don Ma, Cecil Cheng and Tam Kai-Kwan — The Promise	**Best New Director**: **Kenneth Bi — Rice Rhapsody**‡; Mathew Tang — Before Twenty... Before Too Old...; Derek Yee and Chun Tin-Nam — 2 Young; Stephen Fung — House of Fury
**Best Asian Film**: **Kekexili: Mountain Patrol (China)**‡; Howl's Moving Castle (Japan); Three Times (Taiwan); Sympathy For Lady Vengeance (South Korea); Be with You (Japan)	**Professional Achievement Award**: **Charles Wang** ‡

== 25th Hong Kong Film Awards in culture ==
The 25th Hong Kong Film Awards ceremony was modeled in a film My Name Is Fame (2006) with Faye Ng (played by Huo Siyan) as an announcer for the Best Supporting Actor category and Poon Ka-fai (by Lau Ching-wan) as one of its nominees. Lau Ching-wan won the Best (Leading) Actor category at the 26th Hong Kong Film Awards (the next year) for this exact role.
