= Fantasia (2004 film) =

2004 Hong Kong film by Wai Ka-fai

- Film poster
- Traditional Chinese: 鬼馬狂想曲
- Simplified Chinese: 鬼马狂想曲
- Hanyu Pinyin: Guǐ Mǎ Kuáng Xiǎng Qǔ
- Jyutping: Gwai2 Maa5 Kwong4 Seong2 Keok1
- Directed by: Wai Ka-fai
- Screenplay by: Wai Ka-fai; Au Kin-yee
- Produced by: Wai Ka-fai
- Starring: Cecilia Cheung; Sean Lau; Louis Koo; Jordan Chan; Francis Ng; Christy Chung; Charlene Choi; Gillian Chung
- Cinematography: Horace Wong; Ng Man-ching
- Edited by: Marco Mak
- Music by: Teddy Robin
- Production companies: Sil-Metropole Organisation; China Star Entertainment Group; One Hundred Years of Film
- Distributed by: China Star Entertainment Group
- Release date: 15 January 2004
- Running time: 103 minutes
- Country: Hong Kong
- Language: Cantonese
- Box office: HK$25 million

Fantasia (Chinese: 鬼馬狂想曲) is a 2004 Hong Kong comedy film produced, written and directed by Wai Ka-fai and starring Cecilia Cheung, Sean Lau, Louis Koo, Jordan Chan, Francis Ng and Christy Chung. The film is a homage to classic Hong Kong comedy films which starred the Hui Brothers, Michael Hui, Samuel Hui and Ricky Hui, particularly the 1976 film, The Private Eyes.

== Plot ==
In 1969 Hong Kong, private detective agency director Man (Sean Lau) and his two employees, Sam (Louis Koo) and Fugu (Jordan Chan), are investigating an adultery case, where they track their target and crashing into an antique shop, where they end up causing a lot of damage there. Man, who is greedy and miserly, forces Sam and Fugu to be held responsible for the damages, while Sam pushes all responsibility solely on Fugu. In the pile of debris, Fugu finds a lamp which was unable to turn on. At the same time, Fugu also receives a call from his aunt informing him that her cousin, Jane Lam (Christy Chung), who is a student of Stanford University studying Aerospace Technology, have gone mad due to over-studying, and is now missing. Fugu is worried to ask Man for a leave of absence. Man and Sam both took a look at the lamp, which was still unable to turn on, where Man throws the lamp out the window. At this point a sorceress named Harmy Bobo (portrayed by Cecilia Cheung, the character's name is a parody of Harry Potter) magically emerges from the lamp. Bobo arrives at Man's agency and asks the trio to each make a wish, so she can return to her world. Man and Sam both thinks Bobo is Fugu's cousin. However, as Bobo fails in her spells, the trio do not believe her to be sorceress, but she continues to help them in secret. One time in a mahjong game, Bobo's failed spells causes Man to be exposed from his cheating, and thus, he forges a rivalry with gang boss Kin (Francis Ng). Bobo's cousins, the Chopstick Sisters (Charlene Choi, Gillian Chung), also happen to be at the hands of Kin, who took them as his goddaughters.

== Cast ==
- Cecilia Cheung as Harmy Bobo
- Sean Lau as Director Man
- Louis Koo as Sam
- Jordan Chan as Fugu
- Francis Ng as Kin
- Christy Chung as Jane Lam
- Charlene Choi as Chopstick Sister (special appearance)
- Gillian Chung as Chopstick Sister (special appearance)
- Max Chan as Lotus gangster
- Ronnie Cheung as Lotus gangster
- Marco Lok as Lotus gangster
- Dickson Li as Lotus gangster
- Johnny Lu as Lotus gangster
- Eric Kot as Mun, street cleaner
- Chui Tien-you as Black suit thief
- Wong You-nam as Black suit thief
- Tats Lau as Chicken thief
- Steven Cheung as Hogwarts School operator
- Kenny Kwan as Hogwarts School operator
- Edmond So as Mr. Cheung
- Winnie Lau as Mrs. Cheung
- May Law as Collegiate quiz show host
- Cheung Tat-ming as 2020 spaceman
- Lam Sheung Yee as TV commentator
- Tommy Wai as Fresh Cream band member
- Wong Wo-hing as Fresh Cream band member
- Ho Ka-kit as Fresh Cream band member
- Ho Ka-ho as Fresh Cream band member
- Michael Hui as Grand Wizard

== Reception ==
=== Critical response ===
Andrew Saroch of Far East Films gave the film a score four out of five stars praising the performance by the cast and calls the film "a comedy with so much energy and buoyant spirit." Love HK Film also praised the performance by the cast and director Wai Ka-fai's care for referencing defining characteristics of classic Cantonese films but notes how audiences who do not get the referential jokes would not enjoy the film. HK Film Net gave the film a positive review referring the film as "entertaining" and "smart", and calls it "an outstanding comedy".

=== Box office ===
The film grossed HK$25,093,425 at the Hong Kong box office during its theatrical run.
