= Anna in Kungfuland =

2003 Hong Kong film by Raymond Yip

- DVD cover
- Traditional Chinese: 安娜與武林
- Simplified Chinese: 安娜与武林
- Hanyu Pinyin: Ān Nà Yú Wǔ Lín
- Jyutping: On1 Naa4 Jyu2 Mou2 Lam4
- Directed by: Raymond Yip
- Written by: Chan Hing-ka; Lau Ho-leung; Ho Man-lung
- Produced by: Chan Hing-ka; Jimmy Law
- Starring: Miriam Yeung; Ekin Cheng
- Cinematography: Cheung Man-po
- Edited by: Cheung Ka-fai
- Music by: Ken Chan; Chan Kwong-wing; Tommy Wia
- Distributed by: Universe Films Distribution
- Release date: 24 December 2003
- Running time: 96 minutes
- Country: Hong Kong
- Language: Cantonese

Anna in Kungfuland is a 2003 Hong Kong romantic comedy martial arts film directed by Raymond Yip, and starring Miriam Yeung and Ekin Cheng.

== Plot ==
Anna (Miriam Yeung) is an aspiring actress, and her father was a monk of the Shaolin temple who defected to Japan after representing the temple during a martial arts tournament. There he met a Japanese woman and later bore Anna. He starts a martial school in Japan, although he dreams of being reconciled with his former mates.

Anna enters a martial arts tournament, which she hopes will lead to her getting her acting career started. She falls in love with the marketing executive (Ekin Cheng) who organized the tournament.

== Cast ==
- Miriam Yeung as Anna Shek
- Ekin Cheng as Ken Kei
- Wong You-nam as Sam Kei
- Denise Ho as Zoe Pak
- Cheung Tat-ming as Tournament MC
- Maggie Lau as Big twin
- Mandy Chiang as Small twin
- Benz Hui as Boss Pak
- Lee Lik-chi as Hung Fung
- Lau Kar-wing as Master Wisdom
- Chiu Suet-fei as Nicky
- Charles Ingram as Spencer
- Yasuaki Kurata as Sword Shek
- Tats Lau as Fu
- Lo Mang as Ox
- Michael Clements as Hollywood producer
