= Krusty (disambiguation) =

Krusty the Clown is a fictional character in the cartoon The Simpsons.

Krusty may also refer to:

- Krusty (group), a female Hong Kong music group formed in 2005
- KRUSTY, NASA project aiming to develop nuclear reactors for space travel

== See also ==
- Krusty Krab, a fictional restaurant in the cartoon SpongeBob SquarePants
- Crust punk, or crusty, a musical style
