= JJ Jia =

Hui-Chinese actress and model (born 1982)

- 贾晓晨
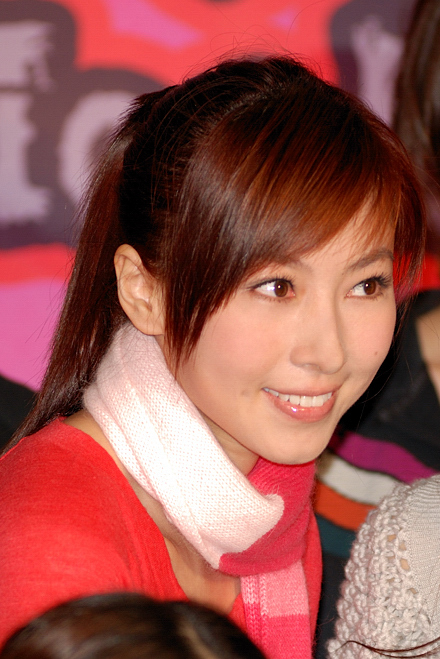
- Jia in 2008
- Born: Jia Xiaochen; September 20, 1982 (age 43); Jinan, Shandong, China
- Other names: Jade; Fatumai
- Occupations: Actress; model
- Years active: 2002–present
- Spouse: Louis Fan (m. 2016)
- Children: 1

Chinese name
- Traditional Chinese: 賈曉晨
- Simplified Chinese: 贾晓晨
Transcriptions
Standard Mandarin
- Hanyu Pinyin: Jiǎ Xiǎochén
Yue: Cantonese
- Jyutping: Gaa2 Hiu2 San4

Jia Xiaochen (born September 20, 1982), also known as JJ Jia and Fatumai, is a Chinese actress and model of Hui ethnicity based in Hong Kong.

== Personal life ==
In 2012, JJ began dating martial arts action star Louis Fan. They married on 1 January 2016 in Hong Kong. In November 2017, they had a daughter nicknamed Little Rice Bowl (小飯兜).

== Filmography ==
=== Film ===
Film	Chinese title	Year	Role	Notes/Ref.
Jin Jian Dao	金剪刀	2002		
Men's Trilogy	男人三部曲	2003	Cuicui	
Juet Chu Fung Sang	絕處逢生	2004		
Wife from Hell	妻骨未寒	2005	Mimi	
A Wondrous Bet	魔幻賭船	2005	Cho Siu-man	
Tea in Love	茶色生香	2006	Zhang Lilei	
Isabella	伊莎貝拉	2006	Cheung Lai-wah	
The Haunted School	校墓處	2007	Yuen See-yum	
La Lingerie	內衣少女	2008	CC	
The Vampire Who Admires Me	有隻僵屍暗戀你	2008	Macy Chan	
Short of Love	矮仔多情	2009	Shum Ka-wai (Kaka)	
Gallants	打擂台	2010	Kwai	
The Jade and the Pearl	翡翠明珠	2010	Yeung Fa	
I Love Hong Kong	我愛HK開心萬歲	2011	Pauline Ha	
All's Well, Ends Well 2011	最強囍事	2011	Kiki	
Don't Go Breaking My Heart	單身男女	2011	Joyce Kiu Yi-sze	
Life Without Principle	奪命金	2011	Miss Ho	
My Sassy Hubby	我老公不靠譜	2012		
Cold War	寒戰	2012	Spouse of Vincent Tsui's	
SDU: Sex Duties Unit	飛虎出征	2013		
Super Models	色模	2015		
Missing		2019		
Little Q		2019		
Ciao UFO	再見UFO	2019	Kin's mother	
Time	殺出個黃昏	2021	Fung's daughter-in-law	

=== Television dramas ===
English Title	Chinese title	Year	Role	Notes
Xiayi Zhuanqi	俠醫傳奇	2004		
Colours of Love	森之愛情	2007	Nurse	Episode 8
Zhen Han Shi Jie De Qi Ri	震撼世界的七日	2007	Feng Ni	
Dressage to Win	盛裝舞步愛作戰	2008	Lola	
The Winter Melon Tale	大冬瓜	2009	Mrs. Kam	
You're Hired	絕代商驕	2009	Gigi Luk	
ICAC Investigators 2009	廉政行動2009	2009	Yoyo	Episode 5: "Public, Private, Car"
Hong Kong Customs	海關故事	2009	Inspector Janet Ka Siu-yin	
Love Thy Family	愛回家	2010	So Fong	
Sisters of Pearl	掌上明珠	2010	Yip Siu-man	
Beauty Knows No Pain	女人最痛	2010	Yeda So Na	
L'Escargot	抉宅男女	2012	Joyce Ko Chi-yiu	
House of Harmony and Vengeance	耀舞長安	2012	Lau Cheuk-law	
Tiger Cubs	飛虎	2012	Fu Sze-sze	
Ghetto Justice II	怒火街頭II	2012	Chin Sam-sam	
Silver Spoon, Sterling Shackles	名媛望族	2012	Chiu Dan-dan	
Friendly Fire	法網狙擊	2012–2013	Grace	Guest star (Episode 1–3)
Season of Love	戀愛季節	2013		
A Change of Heart	好心作怪	2013	Ngan Yat Fei	
Legend of Zu Mountain	蜀山战纪之剑侠传奇	2015	Tu Mei	
The Last Healer in Forbidden City	末代御醫	2016	Hung Bak-hap	
