= Mandy Chiang =

Hong Kong actress and singer

- Born: 22 September 1982 (age 43); Hong Kong
- Occupations: Singer; actress
- Years active: 2002–2008

Chinese name
- Traditional Chinese: 蔣雅文
- Simplified Chinese: 蒋雅文
Transcriptions
Standard Mandarin
- Hanyu Pinyin: jiang3 ya3 wen2
Yue: Cantonese
- Jyutping: zoeng2 ngaa5 man4
- Musical career
- Origin: Shanghai
- Genres: Cantopop
- Label: Emperor Entertainment Group

Mandy Nga-man Chiang is a Hong Kong singer formerly signed to the Emperor Entertainment Group's Music Icon Records. Her music career first began in 2002 when she was partnered with Yumiko Cheng (鄭希怡) and Maggie Lau (劉思惠) to form the female group 3T. The group released one EP (少女蝶) and separated shortly after. Then, in 2005, Mandy's music career began again when she was asked to form a musical dua with Don Li, and together, they released three albums. In January 2007, Chiang announced that she and Li would continue their music careers as solo artists. Her debut solo album was released on 24 April 2007, titled Other Half. She also appeared in several movies and TV series. Today, she is the owner of a café and clothing store in Taipei, Taiwan, where she now resides.

== Filmography ==
- The Twins Effect (2003)
- Anna in Kung-Fu Land (2003)
- New Police Story (2004)
- Yarudora (2005)
- Rob-B-Hood (2006)
- Luxury Fantasy (2007)
- Whispers and Moans (2007)
- A Mob Story (2007)
- The Sparkle in the Dark (2008)
- Yes, I Can See Dead People (2008)
- A Decade of Love (2008)

== Discography ==
- 3T – Butterfly (2003)
- Don & Mandy (2005)
- Don & Mandy – Rainy Lover (2006)
- Don & Mandy – Winter Lover (2006)
- Mandy Chiang – Other Half (2007)
- Mandy Chiang – Winter Story (2007)

== Television series ==
- All About Boy'z (2002)
- The Vigilante in the Mask (2004)
- Kung Fu Soccer (2005)
