= Nightmare (2011 film) =

- Directed by: Yip Wai Ying
- Written by: Taylor Ce Wang
- Starring: Zhou Xianxin; Victor Huang; Wu Jianfei; Gillian Chung; Kenny Kwan
- Production company: China Film Group Corporation
- Distributed by: My Way Film Company
- Release date: November 25, 2011
- Running time: 90 minutes
- Country: China
- Language: Mandarin

Nightmare is a 2011 Chinese horror film directed by Yip Wai Ying.

== Cast ==
- Zhou Xianxin as Fang Lei
- Victor Huang as Wang Quan
- Wu Jianfei as Zhou Feng
- Gillian Chung as Angel
- Kenny Kwan
