= The Death Curse =

2003 Hong Kong film by Soi Cheang

- Film poster
- Traditional Chinese: 古宅心慌慌
- Directed by: Cheang Pou-soi
- Written by: Ng Wing Kei; Szeto Kam Yuen; Nicholl Tang Nik Kei
- Produced by: Amy Tsui
- Starring: Steven Cheung; Charlene Choi; Gillian Chung; Alex Fong Chung-Sun; Kenny Kwan; Raymond Wong Ho-Yin
- Cinematography: Peter Ngor Chi Kwan
- Edited by: Wong Wing Ming
- Music by: Lincoln Lo Kin
- Release date: June 11, 2003 (Hong Kong)
- Running time: 86 minutes
- Country: Hong Kong
- Language: Cantonese

The Death Curse (Chinese: 古宅心慌慌) is a 2003 Hong Kong comedy horror film. It was directed by Soi Cheang Pou-Soi and produced by Amy Tsui. Its popularity was due primarily to its cast, which contained several members of Hong Kong bands, including Twins and Boy'z.

== Cast ==
- Steven Cheung plays the part of Ben Ting, the youngest of eight
- Gillian Chung plays the part of Linda Ting, the sixth sibling of eight
- Kenny Kwan plays the part of Jerry Ting, the fifth sibling, who unknowingly used to date his younger half-sister Nancy
- Raymond Wong Ho-Yin plays the part of Nick Ting, the fourth sibling. Nick is a gangster
- Charlene Choi plays the part of Nancy Ting, the seventh sibling
- Alex Fong Chung-Sun plays the part of Lawyer Cheung
- Chen Xianda (陳顯達) plays the part of Ding Jihuai, a medical scientist who has spurned his relatives and has numerous failed marriages.

== Production ==
Soi encountered issues trying to appease the mainland Chinese censor board's restrictions regarding horror films. Knowing that the censors would take issue with depictions of ghosts, the production team introduced more comedic elements into the movie, portraying the supernatural encounters as pranks performed by the film's antagonist. Soi was still asked by the board to rewrite the script to make it less scary.

== Reception ==
Sharon Wong of New Straits Times wrote, "You probably wouldn't be scared much, and although certain scenes do contain a chill factor, this quickly dissipates. However, The Death Curse is sufficient entertainment for a dreary afternoon." In the Malay Mail, Lim Chang Moh wrote, "Don't expect great acting and you won't be disappointed. The young stars are nice to look at, even if they appear awkward at times."

Variety film critic Derek Elley stated, "Hong Kong pop duo Twins teams with its newer male equivalent, Boy'z, for some light fun 'n' thrills in The Death Curse, a Mainland-shot haunted house movie by promising helmer Soi Cheang (Horror Hotline … Big-Head Monster). The jury's still out on whether Cheang can marshal his early low-budget invention to more mainstream fare, but Twins fans and fantasy fests will want to check out this almost traditional, CGI-light item."
