= The Haunted School (film) =

2007 Hong Kong film by Cash Chin

- Theatrical poster
- Traditional Chinese: 校墓處
- Simplified Chinese: 校墓处
- Hanyu Pinyin: Xiào Mù Chù
- Jyutping: Haau6 Mou6 Cyu3
- Directed by: Cash Chin
- Written by: Philip Lui
- Produced by: Andrew Lau; Stanley Law
- Starring: Chui Tien-you; Theresa Fu; Steven Cheung; Amanda Lee; Dennis Mak; Don Li; Kelly Fu; Macy Chan; Toby Leung
- Cinematography: Tam Chi-wai
- Edited by: Andy Chan; Wong Hoi
- Music by: Wong Kin-wai
- Production companies: Basic Pictures Company Limited; Fortune Star Entertainment (HK) Limited
- Release date: 15 March 2007
- Running time: 88 minutes
- Country: Hong Kong
- Language: Cantonese

The Haunted School is a 2007 Hong Kong horror film directed by Cash Chin and produced by Andrew Lau. It stars Chui Tien-you, Theresa Fu, Steven Cheung, Amanda Lee, Dennis Mak, Don Li, Kelly Fu, Macy Chan and Toby Leung in the lead roles.

== Plot ==
Twenty years ago, a fire broke out in Lap Lan Girls' School and strange incidents started occurring in the school since then. The headmaster hanged himself from a tree while a student committed suicide by jumping off the school building. A silhouette of a person, like a shadow, appeared on a wall near the staircase, and it cannot be erased. Apart from typical school rules, an unreasonable regulation that forbids students from falling in love is strongly enforced in the school, as well as a curfew which states that students are not allowed to leave their dormitories after 11 at night. Whenever a student breaks a school rule or wanders out at night, she will hear a mysterious female voice coming from the sound system, calling her to enter the school office. The student is never seen again after she passes through a supernatural portal into that seemingly non-existent "school office". Each time someone goes missing, a new shadow will appear on that strange wall.

In the present day, under the new education policy, the school accepts four boys (Ben, Charlie, Dick and Keung) as students. The boys are confined to their classroom and dormitory, as the school aims to minimise interaction between them and the girls. However, the students still defy the rules and throw a secret party in the woods, after which, love begins to blossom among the youngsters. Unknown to them, their romance has already revived the curse within their school. Dick and Sze disappear after being pulled into the "school office" by a strange force, while Charlie and Kei die in the same manner as the previous headmaster and the suicide student respectively.

The surviving students seek answers from their teacher, Miss Fong, who tells them that the strict school rules were actually set by a dean, Yuen See-yum 20 years ago. The dean treated students harshly and punished offenders harshly in the school office while the headmaster never interfered in the dean's discipline system. One night, the dean was caught having an affair with the headmaster by the headmaster's wife, who locked her in the school office and burnt her to death in anger. The dean's spirit began haunting the school since then and she continued to "enforce" her rules in a spiritual way. Keung, Yat-man, Ben and Siu-fong work together to search for the exact location of the old school office and destroy it once more, as that is the only way to break the dean's evil curse.

== Cast ==
- Amanda Lee as Fong Siu-yee (Miss Fong)
- Theresa Fu as Ho Yat-man
- Chui Tien-you as Ko Hon-keung
- Steven Cheung as Tik Chi-hang (Dick)
- Toby Leung as Lai Hei-sze
- Dennis Mak as Lau Chuk-ban (Ben)
- Macy Chan as Law Siu-fong
- Don Li as Lee Kwok-chung (Charlie)
- Kelly Fu as So Tsi-kei
- Benjamin Yuen as Ah-man
- Cheung Kwok-keung as Ho Kam-tai
- Susan Tse as Fong Ping
- JJ Jia as Yuen See-yum
