= The Jade and the Pearl =

2010 Hong Kong film by Janet Chun

- Directed by: Janet Chun
- Produced by: Ng Yu; Chan Hing Ka; Chin Siu Wai
- Starring: Charlene Choi; Raymond Lam; Joey Yung; Wong Cho-lam
- Production companies: Shaw Brothers Studio; Television Broadcasts Limited; Emperor Motion Pictures
- Release dates: 30 July 2010 (China); 5 August 2010 (Hong Kong)
- Country: Hong Kong
- Language: Cantonese

The Jade and the Pearl (Chinese: 翡翠明珠; pinyin: Fěicuì Míngzhū; Jyutping: Fei2 ceoi3 ming4 zu1) is a 2010 Hong Kong film co-produced by Shaw Brothers Studio, Television Broadcasts Limited and Emperor Motion Pictures.

== Cast ==
=== Main cast ===
- Charlene Choi as Princess Yin (嫣公主)
- Raymond Lam as General Ching Hin (程騫)
- Joey Yung as Chuk Sam Leung (祝三娘), a thief who lives on the top of the mountain
- Wong Cho-lam as Ling Kam Hoi (凌感開), a storyteller
- Ti Lung as King (皇上)
- Sire Ma as Princess Sau (秀公主)
- Macy Chan as Princess Wah (樺公主)
- Christine Kuo as Princess Kuo (苟公主)
- Kathy Yuen as Princess Yuen (婉公主)
- Katy Kung as Princess Kung (欣公主)
- Jess Shum as Princess Ying (盈公主)
- Mavis Pan as Princess Ping (平公主)
- Tsui Ming as Princess Ko (高公主)
- Yung Kai Nei as Princess Kwai (貴公主)
- Lam Yuen Ha as Princess Heung (香公主)
- Sherry Chen as Chui Luk (翠綠), an odalisque
- Cilla Kung as To Hung (桃紅), an odalisque
- Chapman To as Eunuch Yeung (楊公公)
- Carlo Ng as Eunuch Cheung (張公公)
- Tien Niu as Mrs. Ching (程夫人), Ching Hin's mother
- Alex Man as Poon Wong (番王)
- Patrick Dunn as the "To Fa Wui" host (桃花會主持)
- Lam Chiu Wing as Lee Ngok Ba (李惡霸)
- 6-Wing as Sai Moon (西門)
- Tats Lau as Thief Tat (山賊達, a follower of Chuk Sam Leung
- Steven Cheung as Thief Fan (山賊凡), a follower of Chuk Sam Leung
- Lam Suet as Sing Fu (成虎, a follower of General Ching
- Wong You Nam as Sing Pau (成豹), a follower of General Ching
- JJ Jia as Yeing Fa (楊花), a follower of General Ching
- Kenny Kwan as Scholar Cheung (張公子)
- Ken Hung as Scholar Chu (朱公子)
- Matthew Ko as Scholar Wong (王公子)
- Benjamin Yuen as Scholar Ho (何公子)
- Hayama Go as an Envy State agent (番國特使)
- Anderson Junior as the Mayor (鎮長)
- Chow Chi Ho as Bandit Luk Kam Sing (土匪陸金勝)
- Wong Chi Bun as the artist (畫師)
- Lam Kwok Ping as an art appreciator (藝術欣賞者)
- Kung Siu Ping as a story listener (說書聽眾)
