= Macy Chan =

Hong Kong actress and singer

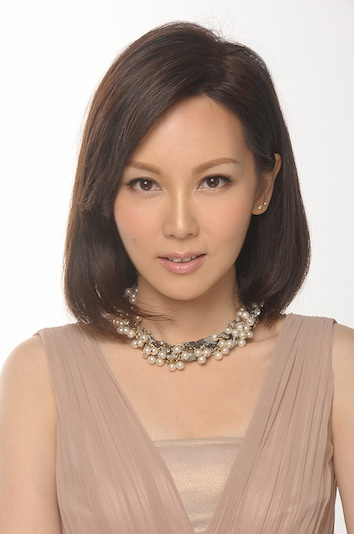
- Born: 22 February 1981 (age 45); Hong Kong
- Occupations: Actress, singer, television presenter
- Years active: 2004–present
- Partner: Eric Suen

Chinese name
- Traditional Chinese: 陳美詩
- Simplified Chinese: 陈美诗
Transcriptions

Macy Chan (Chinese:陳美詩, born 22 February 1981) is a Hong Kong actress and singer.

== Filmography ==
=== TV series ===
Year	Title	Role	Notes
2004	Sunshine Heartbeat	Macy	
2008	Forensic Heroes II	Fong Miu Na (Formula)	
2008	Last One Standing	Ma Ngoi Lam (Kelly)	
2008	Pages of Treasures	Mai Suet (Michelle)	Guest star
2009	A Bride for a Ride	Sze Mung Lo	
2009	D.I.E. Again	Law Pak Chi (Pat)	
2010	Don Juan DeMercado	Song Dan Yi	Guest Star
2010	Sisters of Pearl	Chu Pik Lam	
2010	Every Move You Make	Emily Chow	
2010	Twilight Investigation	Cheuk Yan	
2011	Dropping by Cloud Nine	Ying Ying	
2011	Only You	Tong Yin Sang	
2011	Relic of an Emissary	Sharen Gaowa	
2011	Curse of the Royal Harem	Choi Kiu	
2012	Three Kingdoms RPG	Macy	
2013	Sergeant Tabloid	Shun's Wife	ep.21

=== Film ===
Year	Title	Role	Notes
2005	Moments of Love	Wiz	
2005	Yarudora	Macy	
2006	I'll Call You	Ceci	
2007	Happy Birthday	Teresa	
2007	The Haunted School	Ah Fung	
2010	The Jade and the Pearl	princess	
2010	72 Tenants of Prosperity		
2011	I Love Hong Kong		
2011	The Fortune Buddies		
2014	Grey Met Shrek		
2019	Prison Flowers		

== Personal life ==
On 4 May 2017, Macy Chan married Eric Suen in Los Angeles after eight years of dating.
