= The Fox Lover =

2013 Chinese film

- Directed by: Niu Chaoyang
- Written by: Niu Chaoyang
- Release date: September 28, 2013
- Running time: 135 minutes
- Country: China
- Language: Mandarin
- Box office: $4,970,000

The Fox Lover (Chinese: 白狐; pinyin: Bai Hu; lit. 'White Fox') is a 2013 Chinese film directed by Niu Chaoyang and starring Gillian Chung, Julian Cheung, Kara Hui and Gao Hu. The film is alternatively titled The Fox Seduction in English.

== Plot ==
The film opens with Madame Yu conversing with Lord Weng and his son, Yuan Feng, who has been suffering from a mental disability for three years. In return for a favor Lord Weng did for Madame Yu, Madame Yu offers to Yuan Feng the hand of one of her many daughters. After seeing them all, Yuan can still not decide until the arrival of Willow. Upon seeing her, he picks Willow as his bride. Madame Yu then hands Yuan one of Willow's hair clasps, claiming that this will make Willow his. Madame Yu informs Lord Weng that he and his son are in a dream, and that they should come to meet her and Willow that night. After their departure, she informs Willow of Yuan Feng's choice. Willow however has no desire to wed, and pleads with her mother. Madame Yu eventually convinces her to at least meet Yuan.

As Yuan, Ji Yao, and Lord Weng make their way to the meeting point, they are attacked by the Sea Bat King and his minions. Lord Weng is carried off by the minions before Madame Yu and Willow arrive, and quickly dispel the bats. Willow meets Yuan Feng, and Yuan Feng clutches her, crying that his father is gone as Willow half heartedly comforts him. Madame Yu takes Ji and Yuan to the home of the Fox Fairies, where she and her daughters, save Willow, witness the death of Lord Weng at the hands of the King. Madame Yu, distraught, attempts to head out to avenge Lord Weng, but is stopped by her daughters who ask for time to prepare.

Willow in the meantime is spending some time with Yuan Feng. When he embraces Willow, she asks if he will never let her go. As he states he won't, he is stabbed with a flying knife, an arrow, and set afire, all while holding Willow. Willow believes he truly loves her, until some of her sisters, led by Lotus, coax Yuan Feng into saying the same thing to them. Disheartened, Willow throws herself on her mother's mercy, and Madame Yu relents, saying that they will be taking Yuan Feng to a local medicine man, Master Shaye, who will be able to help awaken the power within Yuan Feng. Once he has been awakened, he will forget all of the past three years, including Willow, and can choose another bride.

Together, Madame Yu, Willow, Lotus, Ling, Ji Yao, and Yuan Feng set out to meet the medicine man, leaving the remaining sisters to protect the Valley from the Sea Bat King.

Unknown to any of the others, Lotus is keeping the Sea Bat King aware of their movements; she has been secretly seeing him as a lover for many years, and the Bat King asks here for info on their location...lying that Lotus' mother will not be harmed by him in exchange for the information.

Upon arrival of the small group at the doctor's residence, they are aware of the Sea Bat King's presence, and a battle ensues. Madame Yu sends Ling and her other daughters back with the civilians back to the fairy valley, and Willow and Yuan Feng to the farthest reaches of the desert for protection; also, Lotus confronts the Bat King, demanding that he not harm her mother; after her treachery is discovered, Madame Wu disinherits Lotus and sends her away.

Madame Yu is killed, and Willow and Yang Feng return and battle the Bat King; Willow at first successfully defends herself and Feng against the Bat King with the Power of 9-Tail transferred to her secretly the month before by Madame Wu; however, the Bat King prevails with Yuan Cheng protecting Willow from death by shielding her with his body, adamantly refusing to leave her while she demands he leave and hide.

Chanting a nursery rhyme, the two unite their powers and drive the Bat King away, but both pass out from the effort.

When willow woke up she is in the home of the Master Shaye. Master Shaye tell Willow in order to reawaken Yuan Feng superior energy, it will take a span of 1 year. Willow offer to infuse her 1000 years of energy to reduce the process to 1 day. Master Shaye tell willow, in doing so she will slowly lose all her memories within 14 hours, and will be pass out for the first 10 hours. Willow agreed to the procedure as her 3 reasons are, making her deceased mom happy, saving mankind, and spending the last 14 hour with her and Yuan Feng fully conscious will be a blessing. Master Shaye process to perform the ritual.

Meanwhile, Hong Lian (lotus) confront King Bat, and is kill while trying to avenging her mother.

After the ritual, Willow head back to her sacred Fox Fairies valley with the still unconscious Yuan Feng. Willow tell her sister that Yang Feng must re choose his bride, and who ever he choose will have to marry him in the evening. Yuan Feng awaken and is told by Ji Yao, that the past 3 years of his life have been completely wipe clean. Yuan Feng doesn't believe Ji Yao, till Ji Yao bring up Yang Feng's father medallion. Ji Yao tell Yan Feng that he must choose 1 out of the 9 girls in the valley, and it must be done by the evening.

They both head to meet the girls. As Yuan Feng review all of the girls, he eventually choose Ling the mortal among the other fox fairy girls. All of the remaining girls begin to exit out of the area, and Yuan Feng grab Willow and mention how he remember her smell from before. Willow and Yuan Feng embrace each other, till madame Yo come along.

Madame Yo tells Willow that she and her mother misheard the prophecy of the superior being. In order to release his energy, the bring must mate with a mortal girl not a spirit fox. Heart broken Willow repeat her phrase of marrying Yuan Feng, as she continue to lose more of her memories.

Ling meet up with Yuan Feng to show him to his wedding chamber. When arrived Yuan Feng see Willow with his cousin Ji Yao. Ji Yao tells Yan Feng that he and Willow are lovers. Yuan Feng refuse to believe it, and want Willow to tell him the truths. Willow's memories are fading away so she write a message on her palm, to tell Yuan Feng she doesn't love him.

Yuan Feng marrying Ling "the mortal girl", as requested by Ji Yao and Willow. Willow have given the bride role to Ling, due to the prophecy saying the superior being must mate with a mortal that he truly love. Willow finds her hair braces left by Yuan Feng, and remember she gave it to him as a sign of their love. Willow remembers Yuan Feng, and how Yuan Feng always wanted to see Willow dance for him. Willow begin to dance, and memories of her love for Yuan Feng surfaced temporarily.

The King bat have fully recover from Yuan Feng earlier attack, and head to fox fairy valley. The fox fairy sisters and Willow defend against the King bat attack, till all of them are killed except for Willow. Willow is badly injured by the Bat King, till Yuan Feng arrive to save her. Yuan Feng's power have awaken due to mating with Ling, and he able to kills the bat king. Yuan Feng then aid the injured Willow, and tell her that he love her. Yuan Feng begin to cry, and Willow started chanting the same nursery rhyme that was told by Yuan Feng earlier. Yuan Feng then promise again to never let Willow go, even if he is stab by a knife, hit by an arrow, or burnt to a crisp. After hearing that Willow dies, and is slowly evaporated into thin air.

5 years later, Yuan Feng & Ling is happily marry and have daughter name Joy. Yuan Feng see Joy spreading her works, and is reminded of Willow. Ling remind Yuan that a portion of Willow spirit is infused in him.

In a dream state, Willow and Yuan Feng meet again. Yuan Feng tell Willow that he doesn't remember her, but can still recognize her smell. They finally embrace each other again.

== Cast ==
- Gillian Chung - Xiao Cui (Willow)
- Julian Cheung - Wang Yuan Feng
- Kara Hui - Hu mu (Madame Yu)
- Abby Yin Guo-Er - Ling
- Gao Hu - Hai Fu Wang (King of Sea Bat)
- You Benchang - Master Shaye
- Gong Xinliang - You Niang
- Kenny Kwan - Zhi Jing (Wisdom Spirit)
- Wilson Guo - Ji Yao
- Jing LIngxiao - Lǜ Zhi (Bamboo)
- Li Xin Chen - Jin Rui (Gold)
- Chen Ha Ni - Hong Lian (Lotus)
- Wang Zhixuan - Zǐ Jīng (Flower)
- Sun Zijun - Zi Yu (Jade)
- Yao Fei Fei - Fen Tao (Peach)
- Karl Seruno (Peach husband)
