= Krusty (group) =

Cantopop music group

- Born: Hong Kong
- Years active: 2005-2007
- Musical career
- Origin: Hong Kong
- Genre: Cantopop
- Label: Silly Thing
- Members: Jan Cheung, Chucky

Krusty was a Cantopop music group formed by Jan Cheung (Chinese: 張詠恩; pinyin: Zhāng Yǒngēn) and Chucky (Chinese: 活己嵐; pinyin: Huó Jǐlán). The group was created by the Hong Kong music production company Silly Thing in 2005. The group received a number of commercial and advertising contracts including Panasonic, Esprit, Coca-Cola, Levi's, Sunday, Beauty Square, California Red Karaoke, Puma and 2% ODF. In December 2005, they became the celebrity endorsers of Hyundai Group products such as cameras and MP3 players. The group's name was inspired by Krusty the Clown from The Simpsons.

Krusty's first album, Hello Krusty, was released in 2005 and the song "Krusty’s Wardrobe" soon became a #1 hit on the Hong Kong Music Bus for two weeks.

A reviewer for Macao Daily News said in 2005 that "their looks are ordinary and their vocal abilities are merely average".

Jan Cheung is the older sister of Steven Cheung, the leader of another Cantopop music group Sun Boy'z, and Ryan Cheung. They were born of Chinese/Dutch parentage.
