= The Twins Effect =

2003 Hong Kong film by Dante Lam and Donnie Yen

- Film poster
- Traditional Chinese: 千機變
- Simplified Chinese: 千机变
- Hanyu Pinyin: Qiān Jī Biàn
- Jyutping: Cin1 Gei1 Bin3
- Directed by: Dante Lam; Donnie Yen
- Written by: Chan Hing-kar; Jack Ng
- Produced by: Cheung Shing-sheung
- Starring: Charlene Choi; Gillian Chung; Ekin Cheng; Edison Chen; Anthony Wong; Mandy Chiang; Josie Ho; Maggie Lau; Jackie Chan; Karen Mok; Chapman To
- Cinematography: Cheung Man-po
- Edited by: Chan Kei-hop
- Music by: Chan Kwong-wing
- Production companies: Emperor Multimedia Group; Goldpeak Corporation Limited
- Distributed by: Columbia Tristar Home Entertainment
- Release date: 8 March 2003
- Running time: 107 minutes
- Country: Hong Kong
- Language: Cantonese
- Box office: $28,423,960 (Hong Kong)

The Twins Effect, also known as Vampire Effect in the United States, is a 2003 Hong Kong martial arts comedy-horror film directed by Dante Lam and Donnie Yen. The film was derived from the Cantopop group Twins, starring both members Charlene Choi and Gillian Chung in the leading roles. Co-stars include Edison Chen and Ekin Cheng. Jackie Chan makes a cameo appearance as an ambulance driver.

Released on 8 March 2003, The Twins Effect was a box-office success in Hong Kong, becoming the highest-grossing domestic film of the year. The film gained huge popularity, mainly from fans of the Cantopop group Twins.

== Plot ==
An evil vampire duke seeks to kill and collect the blood of a royal family of European vampires in order to become all powerful. The last surviving member of the family, Prince Kazaf, flees to Hong Kong with his servant Prada. There, they are introduced by estate agent Momoko to live in an abandoned church.

Vampire hunter Reeve is depressed after his partner Lila is killed by vampires. He decides to train Lila's younger sister, Gypsy, to inherit her sister's duty and fight the vampire duke. However, Reeve's own sister, Helen, sees Gypsy as a rival.

At the same time, Kazaf meets Helen and falls in love with her, after which he intends to lead the life of a human being, but he is tracked down by the duke. Helen helps Kazaf and lets him hide in her home, where they are later discovered by Gypsy. Meanwhile, Reeve falls into the duke's trap while hunting vampires. Helen and Gypsy team up to save him.

== Cast ==
- Charlene Choi as Helen
- Gillian Chung as Gypsy
- Ekin Cheng as Reeve
- Edison Chen as Kazaf
- Anthony Wong as Prada
- Mandy Chiang as Momoko
- Josie Ho as Lila
- Maggie Lau as Nurse Maggie
- Jackie Chan as Jackie Fong, the ambulance driver (cameo appearance)
- Karen Mok as Ivy
- Chapman To as Ken
- Mickey Hardt as Duke Dekotes
- Cheung Tat-ming as Jackie's friend
- Ricardo Mamood as Ethan
- Winnie Leung as Deborah
- Digger Mesch as Vampire Thomas
- Marky Lee Campbell as Vampire Boz
- Mark Strange as Vampire Smashing
- Philip Chen as Vampire Lebrow
- Daniel Whyte as Vampire Ice
- Simon Robida as Vampire Zoolander
- Daniel O'Neill as Vampire Dan
- Bey Logan as Vampire John
- Robert Meister as Vampire Elron
- Michael Clements as Vampire Nobals
- Don Ferguson as Vampire Train
- Philip Ng as Ambulance Vampire (uncredited)
- Matthew Sturgess as Vampire Food (uncredited)
- Spencer Lam as Jackie's father
- Matt Chow as Matt
- Yumiko Cheng as a wedding guest
- Victy Wong as a wedding guest
- Ho Wai-yip as a wedding guest
- Yeung Yung-lin as a wedding guest

== Alternate version ==
After its release in Hong Kong, the film was renamed to Vampire Effect and some sequences were slightly altered. The new version was released in the United States in DVD as well.

The following are some differences between Vampire Effect and The Twins Effect:

- Several scenes and timelines in the opening sequence are altered
- Some scenes' editing are different
- Some dialogues were modified
- About 20 minutes of footage were cut from the original film, but some new scenes were added
- The new film length is shorter than the original version (88 minutes for Vampire Effect)
- Some film scores / music / instrumentals differ from the original version (different composer)

== Release ==
The Twins Effect was released in Hong Kong on 8 March 2003. In the Philippines, the film was released on 21 January 2004.

=== Home media ===
There are five versions of DVD, along with VCD, released in Hong Kong:

- DAY FOR NIGHT Limited Edition (Limited 3000 sets. 2 DVDs come with Special Packaging, Vampire Slayer's sword, 4 autograph photos and individual printed code on the cover sleeve)
- DAY FOR NIGHT Limited Edition - 2nd Edition (2 DVDs comes with Bronze colour Special Packaging, Bronze colour Vampire Slayer's sword, and 4 autograph postcards)
- First Press 2 DVDs with Metallic / Silver Cardboard Slipcase
- Second Press 2 DVDs with Cardboard Slipcase and altered disc print
- Standard DVD (no slipcase)
- First Press VCD with Metallic / Silver Cardboard Slipcase
- Second Press / standard VCD with Cardboard Slipcase

== Accolades ==
List of accolades
Ceremony	Category	Recipient	Outcome
23rd Hong Kong Film Awards	Best Action Choreography	Donnie Yen	Won
47th Golden Horse Awards	Best Action Choreography	Donnie Yen	Won

== See also ==
- The Twins Effect II
- Vampire film
