= Twins Mission =

2007 Hong Kong film by Kong Tao-hoi

- Hong Kong film poster
- Directed by: Kong Tao-hoi
- Written by: Fong-Sai Keung; Tsui Siu-ming
- Produced by: Tsui Siu-ming; Amy Li
- Starring: Sammo Hung; Charlene Choi; Gillian Chung; Wu Jing; Yuen Wah; Jess Zhang
- Cinematography: Ko Chiu-Lam
- Edited by: Wong Wing-ming
- Music by: Leon Ko
- Distributed by: Sundream Motion Pictures; Emperor Motion Picture Group
- Release date: 15 February 2007 (Hong Kong)
- Running time: 99 minutes
- Country: Hong Kong
- Language: Cantonese

Twins Mission (traditional Chinese: 雙子神偸; simplified Chinese: 双子神偷) is a 2007 Hong Kong action comedy film directed by action choreographer Kong Tao-hoi from a screenplay by Keung Fong-sai and Tsui Siu-ming. It stars Sammo Hung, Charlene Choi, Gillian Chung, Wu Jing, Yuen Wah, and Jess Zhang. The film is a bit of a spoof of the popularity and success of the Twins and leaves the audience with a cliffhanger ending.

== Plot ==
An evil gang of twins hold up a train to steal a magical Tibetan artifact, the Heaven's Bead from 3 Lamas. This artifact has healing powers and is a highly desirable item. A battle ensues and the artifact is knocked from the hands of a parachuting villain into the bag of an unsuspecting passerby.

The passer-by, oblivious, gets into his van and heads to Hong Kong. This is where the other set of twins come in; they are aided by the twin Laus and Uncle Luck as they try to get the Heaven's Bead back.

A secret mission takes place, in which the good twins infiltrate a high rise building in order to recover the item. Although they initially succeed, the artifact is then passed to the wrong twin. Happy, Lilian's sister, who is suffering from cancer is also kidnapped and held prisoner in the high-rise building.

The good twins eventually recover the Heaven's Bead and lose it again while rescuing Happy. The villains get away with the Heaven's Bead.

== Cast ==
- Sammo Hung as Uncle Luck
- Charlene Choi as Jade
- Gillian Chung as Pearl
- Wu Jing as Lau Hay / Lau San
- Yuen Wah as Chang Chung / Chang Yung
- Jess Zhang as Lilian Li
- Steven Cheung as Fred
- Qiu Lier as Happy
- Sek Sau as Professor Mok
- Sam Lee as Officer Lam
- Andy Liang as Wan Pau
- Cody Liang as Wan Lung
- Mona as Mona
- Ammar as Ahao
- Lisa as Lisa
- Long Fei as Kitten
- Long Ze as Puppy
- Albert Leung as Iron Head
- Herbert Leung as Bronze Head
- Lam Ho as Marco
- Lam Kit as Polo
- Liang Yueyun as Miao Kam Fung
- Bobby Yip as Miao Yam Fung
- Chen Hao

== See also ==
- List of Hong Kong films of 2007
- Sammo Hung filmography
- Yuen Wah filmography
