= The Midas Touch (2013 film) =

2013 Hong Kong film by Andrew Fung

- Film poster
- Traditional Chinese: 超級經理人
- Simplified Chinese: 超级经理人
- Hanyu Pinyin: Chāo Jí Jīng Lǐ Rén
- Jyutping: Ciu1 Kap1 Ging1 Lei5 Jan4
- Directed by: Andrew Fung
- Screenplay by: Andrew Fung; Chan Hing-ka; Ho Miu-kei; Ng Wing-san
- Story by: Chan Hing-ka
- Produced by: Chan Hing-ka
- Starring: Chapman To; Charlene Choi
- Cinematography: Lam Chi-kin
- Edited by: Yau Chi-wai
- Music by: Eric Kwok; Ted Lo
- Production companies: Emperor Motion Pictures; Emperor Film Distribution (Beijing); Emperor (Beijing) Culture Development; Letv Pictures
- Distributed by: Emperor Motion Pictures; UA Films
- Release date: 5 September 2013
- Country: Hong Kong
- Language: Cantonese
- Budget: HK$20 million

The Midas Touch is a 2013 Hong Kong comedy film directed by Andrew Fung and starring Chapman To and Charlene Choi as talent managers.

== Plot ==
Successful debt collector Chiu takes pity on a group of wannabe pop starlets when he goes to collect from the agency they are signed with. Naively thinking that he can do a better job in launching their careers, Chiu takes over the company in lieu of the debt but starts to realize he may have overextended himself. Hoping that things might change with a strategic approach, he hires experienced talent manager Suen but with money running low and the company on the brink of bankruptcy, a dejected Chiu is soon ready to admit that his Midas touch has run out until a Korean showbiz entity expresses interest in the girls.

Now Chiu has to decide whether he is willing to say goodbye to his investment and, more importantly, to a dream he has come close to achieving.

== Cast ==
- Chapman To as Mak Chiu (麥超)
- Charlene Choi as Suen Mei-mei (孫美美)
- Gao Yunxiang as J-Dragon (劍龍)
- Christie Chen as Peggy (沛堅)
- Alice Li as Nancy (楠楠)
- Una Xie as Dodo (杜頌)
- Jie Zhuang as Marilyn (瑪莉蓮)
- Venus Wong as River (淼淼)
- Angela Hui as Mona (白日夢)
- Jennifer Zhang as Flora (阿花)
- Deep Ng as Beefy (牛河)
- Johnny Choi as Fries (薯條)
- Ryan Lam as Toast (多士)
- Masaki Heung as Salad (沙律)
- Jenny Lau as Winky (陳詠)

=== Special appearance ===
- Wong Cho-lam as Gibson
- Gillian Chung as Chinese-Korean policewoman
- He Jiong as Nancy's brother
- Hins Cheung as Robber
- Lo Hoi-pang as Boss Chow (周老闆)
- Yumiko Cheng as Tina
- Stephanie Che as Keung (阿強)
- Louis Cheung as Model agency boss
- 6-Wing as Master Rain (雨雲大師)
- Eric Kwok as Director
- Steven Cheung as Director David Tam (譚大衛)
- Vincy Chan as PR lady
- Tyson Chak as Ben
- Lam Chak-kwan as Master of variety
- Ma Yuk-sing as Action choreographer
- Mani Fok as Mani
- Law Chi-leung as Tony
- Derek Kwok as Peter
- Law Wing-cheung as Film workshop boss
- Nicholas Tse as himself

== Critical response ==
Andrew Chan of the Film Critics Circle of Australia writes, "There is also not enough laugh out loud moments for the film to be a comedy and when it tries for dramatic effects, it feels rather odd."
