= Deep Ng =

Hong Kong singer-songwriter and actor

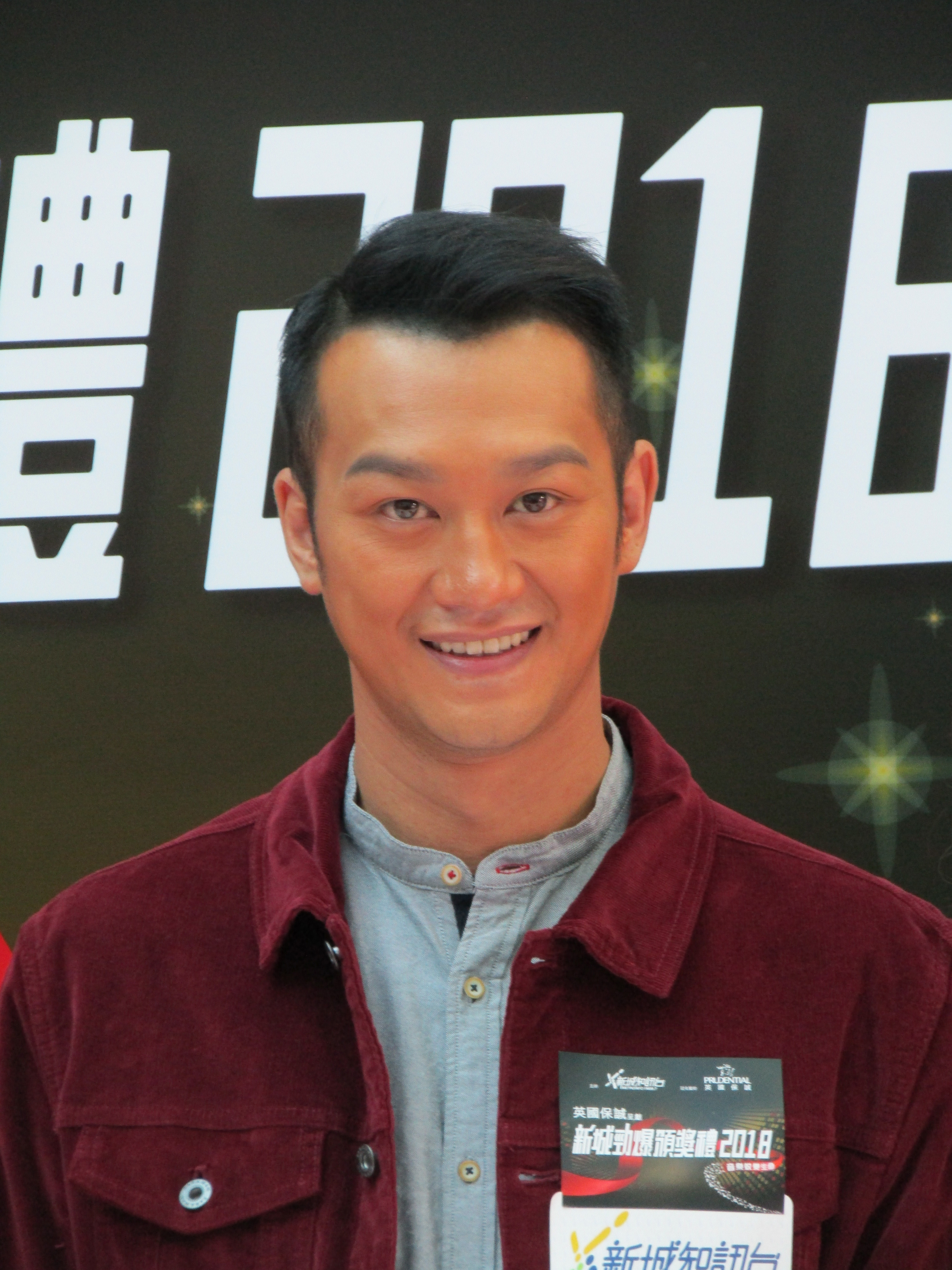
- Ng in 2018
- Born: Ng Wai-Nam (吳偉男); 13 June 1983 (age 43); Cha Kwo Ling, Kowloon, Hong Kong
- Occupations: Singer, songwriter, actor

Chinese name
- Traditional Chinese: 吳浩康
- Simplified Chinese: 吴浩康
Transcriptions
Standard Mandarin
- Hanyu Pinyin: wu2 hao4 kang1
Yue: Cantonese
- Yale Romanization: Ǹg Houhhōng
- Jyutping: Ng4 Hou6hong1
- Musical career
- Origin: Hong Kong
- Instruments: Singing, guitar, piano, drums

Deep Ng is a Hong Kong singer-songwriter and actor. He is the winner of the 21st annual New Talent Singing Awards Hong Kong Regional Finals. Deep was well received by the viewers since the New Talent Singing Awards in 2002. His first EP Deep was released in 2003 with the hit debut single "先入為主". His second album, Nowhere (pronounced as Now-here) was released in September 2005.

In May 2007 he released his New and Best Selection album which contains 3 new songs accompanied with a selection of songs from his previous EP and albums.

In 2008 he released his follow up album titled Reality Co. Ltd. This album was a commentary and reflection on the rise of reality stars and television shows.

In 2009 he released Break It. The album contained ten brand new tracks and an additional 7 live tracks. The lead single "火" (fire) is a Cantonese remake of Terri Walker's "Whoopsie Daisy".

== Thai Boxing bout ==
Deep participated in a Thai boxing bout on 11 December 2010. Although he lost by points decision, many of his supporters and him felt that the result could have been appeal as he received two illegal blows under the belt (which should have resulted from an instant disqualification). However, EEG did not want to encourage him to fight again, and banned him from pursuing the matter.

== Personal life ==
Deep Ng dated with TVB artist Nancy Wu, and broke up peacefully in August 2006, and later dated with Jacquelin Ch'ng for 5 years, and broke up in August 2011.

In 2014, Deep Ng personally confirmed that he was in a relationship with singer Sherman Chung at the awards ceremony of the popular music chart. The two had talked about marriage and marriage stage. As of March 2015, the woman announced that she had broken up because the man cheated on her.

== Discography ==
- Deep EP (2003)
- Deep in the Music (2004)
- Deep: Inside (2005)
- 903 California Red: Eleven Fires Concert – Deep Ng (2005)
- Nowhere (2005)
- Documentary (2006)
- 3.D: New Songs + Greatest Hits (2007)
- Reality Co. Ltd (2008)
- Break It (2009)

== Filmography ==
- Dating Death (2004)
- New Police Story (2004)
- Moments of Love (2005)
- Dancing Lion (2007)
- Invisible Target (2007)
- The Sparkle in the Dark (2008)
- Fate (2008)
- A Decade of Love (2008)
- The Book and the Sword (2009) (TV series)
- The Stool Pigeon (2010)
- Ex (2010)
- Girl$ (2010)
- The Viral Factor (2012)
- Triad (2012)
- The Midas Touch (2013)
- As the Light Goes Out (2014)
- That Demon Within (2014)
- Golden Brother (2014)
- Kung Fu Jungle (2014)
- Gangster Payday (2014)
- SFC 3 (2015) (TV series)
- Drink Drank Drunk (2016)
- The Mobfathers (2016)
- Integrity (2019)
- The Lady Improper (2019)
- Raging Fire (2021)

Preceded by Jenny Ho 何晶晶	New Talent Singing Awards – Hong Kong Regional Finals winner 2002	Succeeded by William Chan 陳偉霆
