= Bug Me Not! =

2005 Hong Kong film by Law Chi-leung

- VCD cover
- Directed by: Law Chi-Leung
- Written by: Tony H. Chow; Yeung Sin-Ling
- Produced by: Albert Lee; Cheung Chi-Kwong; Zhao Jianguo
- Starring: Isabella Leong; Bolin Chen; Kenny Kwan; Gillian Chung; Charlene Choi
- Cinematography: Chan Chi-Ying
- Edited by: Kong Chi-Leung
- Music by: Yue Yat-Yiu; Ho Shan
- Distributed by: Emperor Entertainment Group (Hong Kong); Polybona Films (China); Tai Seng Video (United States)
- Release date: 21 July 2005 (Hong Kong)
- Running time: 87 min
- Country: Hong Kong
- Languages: Cantonese; Mandarin

Bug Me Not! (traditional Chinese: 蟲不知; simplified Chinese: 虫不知; Cantonese Yale: Chung bat ji), – "Bugs Don't Know," is a 2005 Hong Kong film directed by Law Chi-Leung. Isabella Leong, portraying Moon in Bug Me Not!, was nominated for Best New Performer for the 25th Hong Kong Film Awards in 2006.

== Plot ==
Moon is a young girl with the ability to talk to insects. She has always been perceived as a "misfit" because she spoke baby talk too long. She has a crush on a boy named Hyland who works in a store owned by his father, across the street from her house. Unknown to Moon, Hyland has a serious problem with body contact with other people. Moon also meets Coochie, an endearing ladybug who speaks to her and becomes part of her daily life, advising her. Moon meets some children who also have abilities, including telekinetic twins, a high jumping teen, a fortune teller, and a boy with x-ray vision that is a semi-pervert. Leading these misfits is a woman named Auntie who looks early to mid 20s but her actual age is 70. Auntie wants both Moon and Hyland to join her band of misfits because of Moon's abilities and Hyland's ability to dodge from other people's attacks, i.e. superspeed.

== Cast ==
- Isabella Leong (as Moon)
- Bolin Chen (as Hyland)
- Kenny Kwan (as Smarty)
- Steven Cheung (as Eggy)
- Xu Boping (as Baldy)
- Zhao Binqing (as Pearl)
- Zhai Yujie (as Jade)
- Jan Lamb (as Coochie (voice))
- Gillian Chung (as Auntie/Master)
- Charlene Choi (as Sasako)
- Candy Lo (as Moon's mom)
- Lawrence Cheng (as Hyland's dad)
- Tats Lau
- Alexander Chan
- Tse Chi-Wah

== Awards and nominations ==
- Nominated: Golden Horse Awards for Best New Performer (Leong)
- Nominated: Hong Kong Film Award for Best New Performer (Leong)

== See also ==
- List of Hong Kong films
