= Steven Cheung (entertainer) =

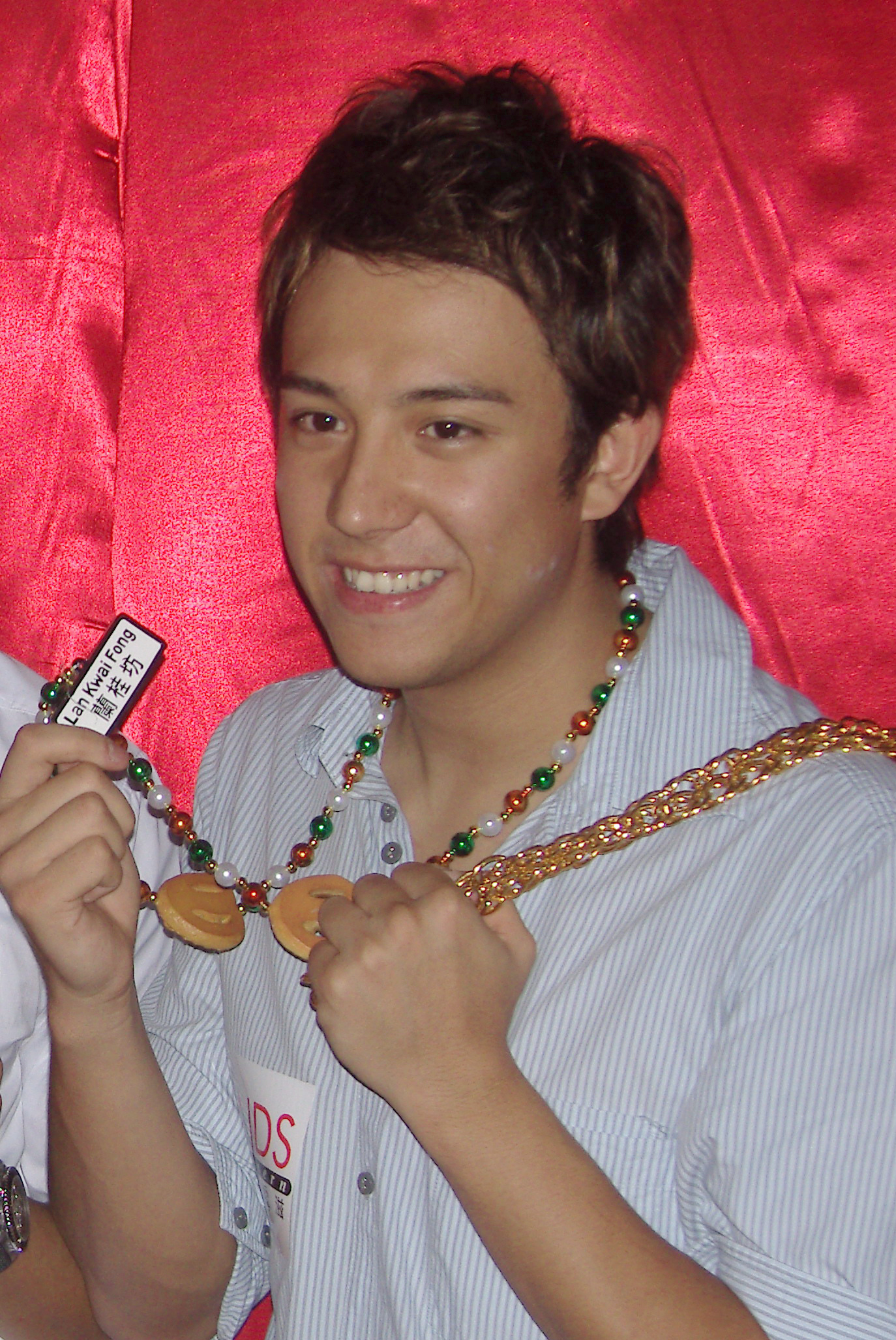
- Cheung in 2008
- Born: 10 November 1984 (age 41)
- Occupation: Singer
- Spouse: Au Yin Man
- Children: 4 Sons

Chinese name
- Traditional Chinese: 張致恆
- Simplified Chinese: 张致恒
Transcriptions
Standard Mandarin
- Hanyu Pinyin: zhāng zhìhéng
Yue: Cantonese
- Yale Romanization: Chēung Jihàng
- Jyutping: Coeng1 Zi3hang4
- Musical career
- Origin: Hong Kong
- Genres: Cantopop
- Instrument: Singing
- Label: Emperor Entertainment Group
- Member of: Boy'z

Steven Cheung Chi-hang is a Hong Kong singer. Steven Cheung was a member of the Cantopop duo, Sun Boy'z from 2002 to 2006, where William Chan joined in and the group was renamed Sun Boy'z. It was officially disbanded in December 2008.

== Biography ==
=== Early life and career ===
Cheung was born into a wealthy family in Hong Kong to a Dutch mother and a Chinese father.

From his father's connection, Steven and his younger brother Ryan Chung became models for Jamcast. He was later referred into Emperor Entertainment Group, while his sister, Jan Chung became a member of the music duo Krusty.

Cheung began his career in the entertainment industry as one-half of the duo Boy'Z with Kenny Kwan in 2002–2005. When Kwan left Boy'Z in January 2005, Cheung continued the duo with Dennis Mak. In June 2006, William Chan joined Boy'Z and the group was renamed as Sun Boy'z (With "Sun" being a parody of the Cantonese pronunciation of "new"). Cheung continued to lead the group until it was disbanded in 2008.

In 2003, Cheung started filming movies with Kenny Kwan and has appeared in a string of low budget movies including, The Death Curse, Bug Me Not!, The Haunted School and A Chinese Tall Story.

In 2009, Cheung and Kenny Kwan started collaborating again under the name Boy'Z.

== Filmography ==
- The Death Curse (2003)
- Fantasia (2004)
- Papa Loves You (2004)
- New Police Story (2004) [cameo]
- 6 AM (2004)
- Bug Me Not! (2005)
- Moments of Love (2005)
- A Chinese Tall Story (2005)
- 49 Days (2006)
- Isabella (2006)
- The Knot (China 2006)
- McDull, The Alumni (2006) (cameo)
- Goodbye...Luisa (2006)
- Twins Mission (2007)
- The Haunted School (2007)
- Super Fans (2007)
- Yes, I Can See Dead People (2008)
- A Decade of Love (2008)
- All's Well, Ends Well 2009 (2009)
- The Jade and the Pearl (2010)
- Lan Kwai Fong (2011)
- The Midas Touch (2013)
- Monkey King – The Five Fingers Group (2019)
- Second Generation Master (2019)
- The Love of Immortal (2019)

== Television series ==
- All About Boy'z
- Hearts Of Fencing [cameo]
- Sunshine Heartbeat [cameo]
- Kung Fu Soccer
- Life Off Stage
- Supreme Fate [Steven@Boy'z]
- Star City
- Til Love Do Us Lie (2011)
- Joyous Marshal
- Sniper Standoff (2013) as Energy On
- Never Dance Alone (2014) as Luke Mo
- Brother's Keeper II (2016) as Piscine Ko
- Flying Tiger II (2020) as Ryan Lee

== Discography ==
As Boy'Z:

2003:

- LaLa 世界
- LaLa 世界 (第二版)
- 一起喝采
- A Year to Remember (AVEP)

2004:

- A Year To Remember (3rd Version)
- Boy'zone 男生圍
- Boy'zone (Version 2)
- Boy'z Can Cook
- Joy to the World Christmas Hits (Box Set with Twins, Yumiko Cheng and Isabella Leong)

2005:

- 星Mobile超時空接觸演唱會
- 八星報囍賀賀囍 (CD with Twins, Yumiko Cheng, Isabella Leong, Deep Ng and Don Li)

2006

- Sun Boy'z – Sun Boy'z (EP)
- Say Goodbye [Isabella Leong ft. Steven Cheung]

2007

- Sun Boy'z – All For 1
- Sun Boy'z – First Date (初次約會)

2011

- Boy'z – Ready to Go
