= Maggie Lau =

- Born: 27 August 1982 (age 44); Hong Kong
- Occupations: Actress; singer
- Years active: 2002–2005

Chinese name
- Traditional Chinese: 劉思惠
- Simplified Chinese: 刘思惠
Transcriptions
Standard Mandarin
- Hanyu Pinyin: Liú Sīhuì
Yue: Cantonese
- Jyutping: lau4 si1 wai6
- Musical career
- Label: Emperor Entertainment Group (2002–2005)

Maggie Lau Si-wai (Chinese: 劉思惠) is a Hong Kong actress and singer. She starred in New Police Story, The Twins Effect and also had a small acting part in The Myth alongside Jackie Chan and Korean actress, Kim Hee-sun.

She has had a minor musical career as a member of the now dissolved girl group 3T. In 2004, she sang in the song "Girls" together with Boy'Z and also appeared in the music video.
