= Sisters of Pearl =

2010 Hong Kong television series

- Official poster
- 掌上明珠
- Written by: Lee Kei Wah; Xun Hou Hou
- Starring: Jessica Hsuan; Michael Tao; Bowie Lam; Kiki Sheung; Joyce Tang; Macy Chan; Joel Chan; Savio Tsang; Lily Leung
- Opening theme: "忘掉自己" (Instrumental version) by Myolie Wu
- Ending theme: "忘掉自己" by Myolie Wu
- Country of origin: Hong Kong
- Original language: Cantonese
- No. of episodes: 28 (26 in the original broadcast, 30 in some overseas on-demand releases)

Production
- Producer: Lam Ga Wah 林志華
- Running time: 45 minutes (approx.)

Original release
- Network: TVB
- Release: 3 May – 5 June 2010

Sisters of Pearl
- Title screen shot
- Traditional Chinese: 掌上明珠
- Simplified Chinese: 掌上明珠
Transcriptions

Sisters of Pearl (Traditional Chinese: (掌上明珠) is a 2010 TVB pre-modern drama series, starring Jessica Hsuan, Michael Tao, and Bowie Lam.

== Synopsis ==
After the death of her husband, Chu Pik-Ha (Jessica Hsuan) returns to her maiden home with her son, in a deliberate attempt to take over the family jewelry business from her elder sister Chu Pik-Wan (Kiki Sheung). To prevent Ha from getting too out of hand, Wan needs her husband Ho Cheung-Hing (Bowie Lam) to create trouble for her sibling. Hing does not follow her instructions, but instead secretly helps Ha tackle her problems one by one. Wan soon comes to realize that Hing has never really got over Ha. Wan's younger sister Chu Pik-Lam (Macy Chan) is still attending school and is too young to deal with such family issues. Wan feels a profound sense of helplessness and becomes even more frustrated when So Lai-Sheung (Joyce Tang) turns up suddenly claiming to be a mistress of her late father and pregnant with his baby. Out of respect for their father, the sisters agree to put Sheung up for the time being until the situation becomes clearer. Shortly thereafter, Ha discovers that Sheung is just a tool of Sang (Michael Tao) who has been plotting to wage a battle of will against the Chu's. Meanwhile, Cheung-Hing has been secretly plotting his revenge against the Chu family all along for framing his father for a crime Wan committed leading to him being jailed in her place, and later committing suicide.

== Cast ==
Cast	Role	Description
Jessica Hsuan	Chu Pik-Ha 朱碧霞	Lo Bak-Tim's mother Chu Pik-Wan and Chu Pik-Lam's sister (young ages played by Crystal Cheung @ HotCha) (semi-villain)
Michael Tao	Hung Yiu-Sang 洪耀生	Chu Pik Wan, Ha, and Lam's cousin good friends with Chow Yuk-Ji; Died because Ho Cheung Hing sets fire to burn Ho Yuet jewellery shop Admires Chu Pik-Ha (semi-villain)
Bowie Lam	Ho Cheung-Hing 何祥興	Chu Pik-Wan's husband Chu Pik Ha's former admirer (Main villain)
Kiki Sheung	Chu Pik-Wan 朱碧雲	Ho Cheung-Hing's wife Chu Pik-Ha and Chu Pik-Lam's older sister (semi- villain)
Joyce Tang	So Lai-Sheung 蘇麗嫦	Chu Siu-Cheung's second wife Hung Yiu Sang's life saver (semi-villain)
Macy Chan	Chu Pik-Lam 朱碧霖	Chu Pik-Wan and Chu Pik-Ha's youngest sister Chow Yuk Tsai's lover
Joel Chan	Chow Yuk-Tsai 周旭仔	Chu Pik Lam's lover good friends with Hung Yiu Sang
Savio Tsang	Ho Cheung-Fat 何祥發	Ho Cheung-Hing's adopted younger brother
Lily Leung	Ngan Yu-Yuk 顏如玉	Chu Siu-Cheung's mother killed by Ho Cheung Hing at episode no.19
Lau Kong	Chu Siu-Cheung 朱兆昌	Chu Pik-Wan, Chu Pik-Ha and Chu Pik-Lam's father So Lai Sheung's husband Died in Episode 2
Lily Li	Ng Ngoi-King 吳愛瓊	
Coleman Tam	Lo Pak-Tim 羅伯添	Chu Pik-Ha's son

== Awards and nominations ==
TVB Anniversary Awards (2010)

- Nominated: Best Drama
- Nominated: Best Supporting Actor (Joel Chan)
- Nominated: Best Supporting Actress (Kiki Sheung)
- Nominated: Most Improved Actor (Joel Chan)

Asian Television Awards (2010)

- Best Drama Performance by an Actor in a Leading Role (Bowie Lam)

== Viewership ratings ==
	Week	Episodes	Average Points	Peaking Points	References
1	May 3–7, 2010	1 — 5	26	—	
2	May 10–14, 2010	6 — 10	26	28	
3	May 17–21, 2010	11 — 15	26	30	
4	May 24–28, 2010	16 — 20	28	30	
5	May 31 - June 3, 2010	21 — 24	30	—	
5	June 4, 2010	25 — 26	30	—	
5	June 5, 2010	27 — 28	33	35	
