= Gillian Chung =

Hong Kong singer and actress (born 1981)

- 鍾欣潼
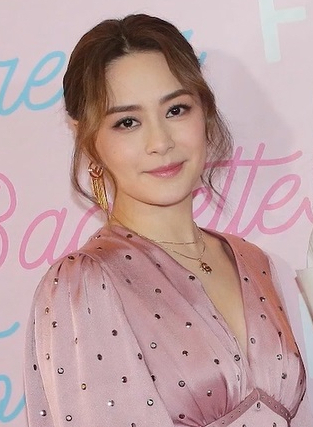
- Chung in 2019
- Born: Chung Tik-shan; 21 January 1981 (age 45); British Hong Kong
- Other name: Chung Ka-lai
- Education: RMIT University
- Occupations: Singer; actress
- Years active: 2000–present
- Spouse: Michael Lai (m. 2018; div. 2020)
- Musical career
- Also known as: Ah-kiu (阿嬌); Ah Gil
- Genre: Cantopop
- Instrument: Vocals
- Label: Emperor
- Member of: Twins

Stage name: Chung Yan-tung
- Traditional Chinese: 鍾欣潼／鍾欣桐 (Note: On 26 August 2013, Chung changed her stage name 鍾欣桐 to 鍾欣潼, both of which are pronounced the same in Cantonese.)
- Simplified Chinese: 钟欣潼／钟欣桐
Transcriptions
Standard Mandarin
- Hanyu Pinyin: Zhōng Xīntóng
Yue: Cantonese
- Yale Romanization: Jūng Yāntùng
- Jyutping: Zung^{1} Jan^{1}-tung^{4}
- Hong Kong Romanisation: Chung Yan-tung

Real name: Chung Ka-lai
- Traditional Chinese: 鍾嘉勵
- Simplified Chinese: 钟嘉励
Transcriptions
Standard Mandarin
- Hanyu Pinyin: Zhōng Jiālì
Yue: Cantonese
- Jyutping: Zung^{1} Gaa^{1}-lai^{6}
- Hong Kong Romanisation: Chung Ka-lai

Birth name: Chung Tik-shan
- Traditional Chinese: 鍾狄珊
- Simplified Chinese: 钟狄珊
Transcriptions
Standard Mandarin
- Hanyu Pinyin: Zhōng Díshān
Yue: Cantonese
- Jyutping: Zung^{1} Dik^{6}-saan^{1}
- Hong Kong Romanisation: Chung Tik-shan
- Website: eeg.zone#/artist/211

Chung Ka-lai (born Chung Tik-shan, 21 January 1981), known professionally as Gillian Chung Yan-tung, is a Hong Kong singer and actress. She is a member of the Cantopop duo Twins, along with Charlene Choi.

== Early life ==
Chung was born in Hong Kong as Chung Tik-shan (鍾狄珊). (Note: traditional Chinese: 鍾狄珊; simplified Chinese: 钟狄珊; pinyin: Zhōng Díshān; Jyutping: Zung1 Dik6-saan1.) Her father died when she was one year old. When she was two years old, her family believed the character Tik (狄) from her birth name to be too strong and renamed her to Chung Ka-lai (鍾嘉勵). (Note: traditional Chinese: 鍾嘉勵; simplified Chinese: 钟嘉励; pinyin: Zhōng Jiālì; Jyutping: Zung1 Gaa1-lai6.)

She initially grew up in a single parent family until her mother remarried to a man also surnamed Chung, when Chung was in high school. She was given the English name "Gillian" while in high school. Chung graduated from Kowloon True Light Middle School and briefly attended the William Angliss Institute of TAFE in Melbourne, Australia.

== Career ==
=== Early years ===
In 2000, Chung was contacted by one of the model agencies she worked part-time with when she was in Hong Kong. She was offered a job opportunity by Emperor Entertainment Group (EEG), which she accepted in that year. She became a contracted artist and underwent training before making her debut. She was advised by her manager Mani Fok to adopt the "Chung Yan-tung" (鍾欣桐) as her stage name, after consulting fortune tellers. The name was supposed to enhance her business skills. On 18 May 2001, the management company assigned her to form a singing duo, Twins, with Charlene Choi. Chung and Choi released their first album three months later.

=== Acting debut ===
Chung made her acting film début in U Man (2002). She appeared in a number of films such as Beyond Our Ken (2004), which earned her critical acclaim as well as a nomination for Best Actress in the Golden Bauhinia Awards. In Beyond Our Ken, Chung played Chan Wai-ching, a spurned girlfriend of the eponymous Ken. The film had its world premiere at the Tokyo International Film Festival and grossed HK$3,886,355 at the box office.

In January 2006, the film 49 Days that Chung starred in had exceeded the HK$10 million (US$1.28 million) mark, earning a spot in one of Hong Kong's best box office films for that year.

=== Return to film industry ===
After withdrawing from public for more than a year following the Edison Chen photo scandal incident and later confessed to having contemplated suicide, Chung apologised for hurting those around her, especially her long-time bandmate Charlene Choi. During the hiatus, she took classes in many areas, such as kung fu (Wing Chun), gymnastics, singing, dancing and acting, which she hoped would serve her professionally. Afterwards she returned to work as spokesperson for TOUGH Jeansmith in the Asia region with a seven-figure pay-check. She flew to Taiwan, Shanghai, and other places for promotion. In July 2009, it was disclosed that she would get a 7-figure sum for the endorsement of botox treatment clinic Dr. Pro. Chung also appeared on stage in an adaptation of Neil Simon's I Ought to Be in Pictures, produced by Emperor Concerts, part of EEG, for a budget of HK$2 million.

=== Silent expression art ===
On 13 September 2009, Chung showcased an emotional performance art video at the Harbin Ice Snow World carnival singing competition. The silent video, previously filmed in Hong Kong, was shown at the fair lasting 8 minutes and 43 seconds. The video showed Chung switching from laughing to crying. This attraction drew hundreds of visitors each day. Many audiences thought that Chung used the art expression to reveal her apologetic attitude. However the video was only meant to show how attitudes are expressed through art, according to artist and video creator Jiang Zhi.

=== Debut solo album ===
On 27 March 2010, Chung released her début solo EP, which was sold as part of the package of Twins' fourth compilation album Everyone Bounce (人人彈起). The EP includes six songs, including début solo single More Hearts (心多) that was released a year prior to the album release.

=== Sisters Who Make Waves ===
On 5 August 2022, Chung debuted at 5th place for the third season of Sisters Who Make Waves which premiered on 20 May 2022, on Mango TV. Chung decided to join the competition with her long time bandmate Charlene Choi and compete against other 28 female artistes with diverse talents. At the same time, Chung aimed to lose weight and retuning her mindset. Due to 4 months of rigorous dance rehearsals and sheer willpower, Chung succeeded in shedding 20 pounds at the end of the competition.

== Personal life ==
=== 2006 invasion of privacy incident ===
In 2006 during a concert in Genting Highlands, Malaysia, a reporter surreptitiously photographed Chung nude in the changing room. On 22 August 2006, Hong Kong tabloid magazine Easy Finder published the photos as a cover story. Hong Kong celebrities such as Jackie Chan and Andy Lau staged a public protest denouncing the magazine. The Obscene Articles Tribunal classified the published photographs as "indecent". On 1 November, Easy Finder lost its appeal against the obscenity ruling, with the appeal panel declaring the article as a "calculated act of selling sexuality which is corrupting and revolting". Jimmy Lai, founder of Easy Finder's publisher Next Media, apologized to Chung and offered to return all the negatives.

=== 2008 photo scandal ===
In January and February 2008, sexually explicit photos of Edison Chen with a number of Hong Kong female celebrities were leaked online. The scandal involved Chung, as well as Bobo Chan and Cecilia Cheung, amongst others. The pictures tarnished Chung's "squeaky-clean image", and she apologized to the public for being naive and silly. Her subsequent television appearance on Jade Solid Gold triggered over 500 complaints to TVB, while the Hong Kong Broadcasting Authority received over 1200. Other promotion events were cancelled.

Chung was dropped from performing in the 2008 Summer Olympics opening ceremony by director Zhang Yimou. She was originally set to appear in Chen Kaige's film Forever Enthralled and Oliver Stone's W., but her scenes were left on the cutting room floor.

=== Marriage ===
In July 2017, Chung met Michael Lai, a Taiwanese gynecologist, while filming Tree in the River in Taiwan and they were in a relationship in October. On 1 February 2018, Chung announced her engagement with Lai on Instagram, with a photo of a diamond ring given by her fiancé. The pair held a wedding ceremony in Los Angeles on 26 May, and one in Hong Kong on 20 December. The couple separated in March 2020.

== Discography ==
Year	Title	Notes
2010	Everyone Bounce	Cantonese EP
2010	Move On...	Cantonese EP
2013	Vernicia Flower	Mandarin album
2014	Wholly Love	Mandarin Album
2022	Two Faced	"Forensic JD" Drama Ending Theme

== Filmography ==
=== Film ===
Year	English title	Original title	Role	Notes
2002	U Man	怪獸學園	Candy Tong So-sum / Piggy	
2002	Summer Breeze of Love	這個夏天有異性	Kammy Chung Lai-san	
2002	If U Care..	賤精先生	Gillian / Kiu	
2002	Just One Look	一碌蔗	Decimator / Ghost girl	
2003	Happy Go Lucky	低一點的天空	Snow White / Snowie	
2003	Colour of the Truth	黑白森林	Katie Wong	
2003	The Twins Effect	千機變	Gypsy	
2003	The Spy Dad	絕種鐵金剛	Cream	
2003	The Death Curse	古宅心慌慌	Linda Ting	
2004	Fantasia	鬼馬狂想曲	Chopstick Sister	
2004	Protege de la Rose Noire	見習黑玫瑰	Gillian Lu	
2004	Love on the Rocks	戀情告急	Mandy	
2004	Moving Targets	新紮師兄2004	Wing	
2004	The Twins Effect II	千機變II之花都大戰	Blue Bird	
2004	Beyond Our Ken	公主復仇記	Chan Wai-ching	
2004	6 AM	大無謂	Herself	
2005	House of Fury	精武家庭	Natalie Yue	
2005	Bug Me Not!	蟲不知	Auntie	
2006	49 Days	犀照	Lam Siu-chin	
2007	Twins Mission	雙子神偷	Pearl	Alternate title Let's Steal Together
2007	Naraka 19	地獄第19層	Rain	
2007	Trivial Matters	破事兒	Cheng Sze-wai	
2008	Forever Enthralled	梅蘭芳	Fu Zhifang	Scenes deleted
2008	W.	小布希傳	Belly dancer	Scenes deleted
2010	Just Another Pandora's Box	越光寶盒	Sun Shangxiang	
2010	Ex	前度	Yee	
2010	The Fantastic Water Babes	出水芙蓉	Gillian Law Kiu	
2010	Super Player	大玩家	Beauty	
2011	Nightmare	午夜凶夢	Angela	
2013	Love Retake	愛情不NG	Nina Su	
2013	Ip Man: The Final Fight	葉問：終極一戰	Chan Sei-mui	
2013	The Midas Touch	超級經理人	Chinese-Korean police officer	Cameo
2013	The Fox Lover	白狐	Xiao Cui	Alternate title Bai Hu
2014	Who is Undercover	王牌	Su Jie	
2015	The Spirit of the Swords	情劍	Zhu Er	
2016	I Love That Crazy Little Thing	那件瘋狂的小事叫愛情	Princess Loulan	Cameo
2016	A Chinese Odyssey Part Three	大話西遊3	Spring Thirteen Mother	
2016	The Wasted Times	羅曼蒂克消亡史	Xiao Wu	
2017	Soccer Killer	仙球大戰	Princess Changping	
2017	77 Heartbreaks	原諒他77次	Heartbeat	Cameo
2017	The House That Never Dies II	京城81號2	Ji Jincui	
2019	Missing	失蹤	Ying	
2019	Prison Flowers	女子监狱		
2021	The First Myth: Daji	封神妲己	Daji	
2022	Green Snake: The Fate of Reunion	青蛇: 前缘	Green Snake	

=== Television ===
Year	English title	Original title	Role	Network	Notes
2001	The Monkey King: Quest for the Sutra	齊天大聖孫悟空	Purple Rose	TVB	
2003	All About Boy'z	一起喝采	Tina	now.com.hk	Appearance in episode 5, 9 & 10
2003	Triumph in the Skies	衝上雲霄	Gillian	TVB	Appearance in episode 6
2003		2半3更之困車立	Kiu	now.com.hk	
2004	Kung Fu Soccer	功夫足球	Kiu	TVB	Guest star
2004	Sunshine Heartbeat	赤沙印記@四葉草.2	Dancer	TVB	Guest star
2004		家有寶貝	Kiu		
2004		上海灘之俠醫傳奇	Female assassin		
2006	Fox Volant of the Snowy Mountain	雪山飛狐	Cheng Lingsu	ATV	
2006	Project A	A計劃 / 盜海奇兵	Mandy	ATV	
2007	The Spirit of the Sword	浣花洗劍錄	Zhu'er	ATV	
2011	The Holy Pearl	女媧傳說之靈珠	Baixi Xianyue / Ding Yao	ZJSTV	
2011	Da Tang Nü Xun An	大唐女巡按	Xie Yaohuan	Dragon TV	
2011	Secret History of Empress Wu	武則天秘史	Shangguan Wan'er	Hunan TV	
2012	The Happy Marshal	春光灿烂之欢乐元帅	Tian Mao Nu / Xian Zi (Fairy) / Qiao Miao	GZTV	
2013	Wheel of Fortune	財神有道	Eighth Princess	CCTV	
2014	Swords of Legends	古劍奇譚	Princess Xunfang	HunanTV	
2015	Extremely Urgent	迫在眉睫	Grace Chen Mo	CCTV	Alternate title: Guardians of Ancient Magic 护宝联盟
2018	Tree in the River	动物系恋人啊	Chu Zhi He	Sohu TV	
2022	Twins Flower Shop	双生花店	Gillian & Charlene		Short Series (都市短剧)
2022	Forensic JD	女法医JD	Lin Xiao Mei / Wei Zi Ling / Miao Zi Ling	WeTV / iQiyi / myTV SUPER	Twins 20th anniversary 12 EP reunion drama

=== Variety shows & other shows ===
Year	English title	Original title	Network	Notes
2016		饭局的诱惑	Tencent Video	Appearance in episode 6
2017		心路	Tencent Video	Guest star (Twins)
2017		熟悉的味道2	Zhejiang TV	Appearance in episode 9
2017	If You Can Talk	冒犯家族	iQIYI	Appearance in episode 7
2019		鲁豫有约一日行第9季	NengLiang Media	Guest star (Twins)
2019	Everybody Stand By (Season 1)	演员请就位第一季	Tencent Video	Appearance in episode 1,4-8
2020		举杯呵呵喝 第二季	YOUKU	Appearance in episode 7
2021		因为是朋友呀	Douyin	Appearance in episode 1-12 (Twins + Joey Yung)
2021	Twinkle Love	怦然心动20岁	Jiangsu TV	Appearance in episode 1-10
2021	Perfect Summer S2	完美的夏天2	Dragon TV	Appearance in episode 5-7 (Twins)
2022	Sweet Tasks 2022	甜蜜的任务 2022	Mango TV	Guest star (Twins)
2022	Hello Saturday	你好，星期六	Mango TV	Guest star (Twins)
2022		朋友请听好2	Mango TV	Appearance in episode 4
2022	Sisters Who Make Waves (Season 3)	乘风破浪3	Mango TV	Debuted 5th Place
2022		90婚介所2022	Bilibili	Guest star (见证官)
2022		百川可逗鎮	Douyin	Guest star (Twins)
2022	Promise For You	星星的约定	Mango TV	EP1 released. Off air till further notice
TBA		美好在出发	Dragon TV	
2022 - 2023	Meet Rosy Clouds	与彩云相遇	Yunnan Int. Channel	Show title renamed from 'Promise For You'
2022 - 2023	Hunan Satellite TV's 2022 - 2023 New Year's Eve Concert	湖南卫视2022-2023跨年晚会	Hunan & Mango TV	2 Performances (Twins + First Day)
