= Kenny Kwan =

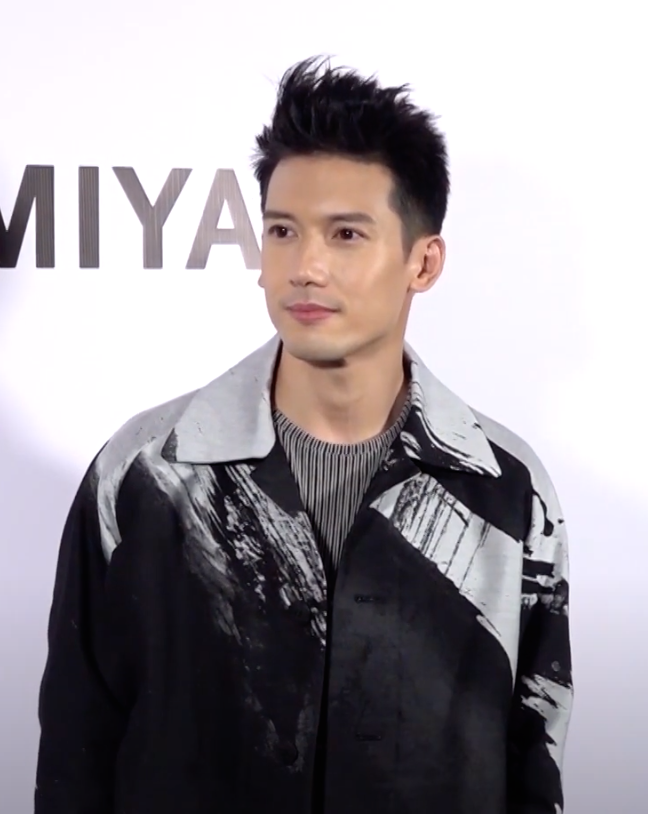
- Kenny Kwan in 2019
- Born: December 30, 1980 (age 45); Philippines
- Occupation: Singer
- Years active: 2002–present

Chinese name
- Traditional Chinese: 關智斌
- Simplified Chinese: 关智斌
Transcriptions
Standard Mandarin
- Hanyu Pinyin: guān zhìbīn
Yue: Cantonese
- Yale Romanization: Gwāan Jibān
- Jyutping: Gwaan1 Zi3ban1
- Musical career
- Origin: Hong Kong
- Genres: Cantopop
- Label: EEG

Kenny Kwan Chi-bun (Chinese: 關智斌, born December 30, 1980) is a Philippine-born Hong Kong singer under the music label Emperor Entertainment Group. He was born in the Philippines but grew up in Hong Kong.

At age 20, he and his friend, Steven Cheung were created as members of Boy'z, which is now known as Sun Boy'z.

In 2005, Kenny was asked to leave Boy'z so he could pursue his career as a solo artist. He has since released three albums (July 2005, December 2005, and July 2006) called "Oncoming", "Musick", and "Mie Wo Sagashite", respectively. On July 13, 2006, Kenny released his newest album, "Mie Wo Sagashite" with a 160-page photo book.

In 2007, Kenny was a guest at the Success Gala in Vancouver, where he performed and raised money for the organization. Kenny was also featured in Sun Boy'z' new song, 3+1=1, on their second album, All For 1. This marks their first collaboration since he left the group.

In 2010, Kenny and Steven rejoined the band Boy'z and released a new album called "Ready to Go" in 2011. With his album "Ready to Go", he won "The Best Mandarin Song" for Sexy Body in an award ceremony in 2012 with AK and William Chan.

In 2011, he participated in the short micro-drama "Banana Boy", with June Ng, Caesar Lee, and a few more banana boys. His popularity rose after this show and another show in 2013 with the famous Chinese actress Zhao Li Ying in 追鱼传奇. He starred with Zhao Li Ying and Allen Ting in the 2014 series Wife's Secret. He played two roles in the series. Besides, he is also in Ruby Lin's series Singing All Along as Deng Yu.

In 2016, he released an album called 角色, including old songs and new songs. This was his first solo album since the release of Kenny's Essentials in 2008.

In 2021, he released a Cantonese album – "There are new years ahead, remember to keep going" (前面是新的歲月記得走下去) - including collaborations with SHIMICA and Cherry Ngan 顏卓靈.

== Discography ==
- 2005: Oncoming
- 2005: Musick
- 2006: Mie Wo Sagashite
- 2007: In Progress
- 2008: Kenny's Essentials
- 2016: 角色 (Role)
- 2021: 前面是新的歲月記得走下去

== Filmography ==
- The Death Curse (2003)
- Pa Pa Loves You (2004)
- New Police Story (2004) [cameo]
- Fantasia (2004)
- Love Battlefield (2004)
- 6 AM (2004)
- Bug Me Not! (2005)
- A Chinese Tall Story (2005)
- Trivial Matters (2007)
- The Sparkle in the Dark (2008)
- The Deserted Inn (2008)
- Stage of Youth (2008)
- Pandora's Booth (2009)
- The Jade and the Pearl (2010)
- Nightmare (2011)
- Who in the Mirror (2012)
- Legend of Chasing Fish (2013)
- The Fox Lover (2013)
- As the Light Goes Out (2014)
- Your Highness (2017)
- Blood Fist (2018)
- The Fallen (2019)
- The Twin Flower Legend (2020)
- Green Dragon Crescent Blade (2021)
- White War (2021)
- Back From the Brink (2023)
