= New Police Story =

2004 Hong Kong film by Benny Chan

- Hong Kong film poster

Chinese name
- Traditional Chinese: 新警察故事
- Simplified Chinese: 新警察故事
Transcriptions
Standard Mandarin
- Hanyu Pinyin: Xīn Jing Cha Gu Shi
Yue: Cantonese
- Jyutping: San1 Ging2 Caat3 Gu3 Si6
- Directed by: Benny Chan
- Screenplay by: Alan Yuen
- Produced by: Willie Chan; Benny Chan; Barbie Tung; Solon So
- Starring: Jackie Chan; Nicholas Tse; Charlie Yeung; Charlene Choi; Daniel Wu
- Cinematography: Anthony Pun
- Edited by: Yau Chi-Wai
- Music by: Tommy Wai
- Production companies: JCE Movies Limited; China Film Group Corporation
- Distributed by: Emperor Motion Pictures
- Release date: 24 September 2004
- Running time: 124 minutes
- Country: Hong Kong
- Languages: Cantonese; English
- Box office: HK$21,109,502

New Police Story is a 2004 Hong Kong action thriller film directed by Benny Chan. It stars Jackie Chan, Nicholas Tse, Charlie Yeung, Charlene Choi, and Daniel Wu. The film follows a disgraced police officer who seeks redemption by vowing revenge against a gang of bank robbers who killed his entire squad. It was released theatrically in Hong Kong on 24 September 2004.

New Police Story is a darker, grounded reboot of the Police Story series and is the fifth installment of the series. New Police Story relies much more on drama and violence than its predecessors. A sequel to the film, titled New Police Story 2, is currently in development.

== Plot ==
Five youths rob a bank with the intention of shooting police officers. Chief Inspector Chan Kwok-wing and his squad chase the gang and the entire squad is wiped out, including Hong, the younger brother of Chan's girlfriend Ho Yee. Chan is the sole survivor of the incident and takes a year long leave from the force to binge-drink until his new partner Frank Cheng tries to convince him to return and reopen the case.

Chan initially refuses, but changes his mind after apprehending two youths who robbed him while he was drunk. Chan's colleague Chief Inspector Chiu Chan, believing Chan's overconfidence was responsible for the disastrous raid, challenges them to solve the case before he does. Frank reveals to Chan he is kin of a deceased squad member. Former colleague Sam Wong reveals a clue from the first robbery, a watch he snatched from a robber. Wong says one of the gang is a woman and that they like to play X-games.

Chan and Frank are tailed by Chiu and the police at an upcoming X-Games event. Sam has been arrested to assist in the investigation. At the skyscraper rooftop event, Frank and Chan locate gang member Fire, while Sam and the police find the woman robber Sue. Fire fatally wounds Sam and escapes with Sue. Sam confesses he was blackmailed by the gang so they could ambush Chan's team. Chan and Frank chase Sue and Fire down the building on a tightrope.

Fire shoots a bus driver forcing Chan and Frank to break off the chase to save the bus. Chan's superior, Superintendent Tai reveals that he never assigned a partner to Chan. Chan confronts Frank, who admits he failed the exam to be a cop; he is neither a cop nor a kin of deceased squad member. Chan is convinced that Frank is sincere, and the two are briefed by Frank's friend, Constable Sa Sa, that the gang members come from rich families and their leader Joe is the son of the Deputy Commissioner of Police. The gang created online video games based on their raids.

At the gang's new hideout Joe kills Sue, who was critically wounded during the chase. The gang plants a bomb on Ho Yee and send her to the police station. The blast knocks Ho Yee into a coma. Frank's false identity is revealed and he and Chan are arrested. The gang taunts them about their next target. Frank and Chan are unofficially released to apprehend the gang.

Through the online game, Chan, Frank and Sa Sa learn that the gang's next target is the Bank of Hong Kong (which in real life was filmed at the Hong Kong Convention and Exhibition Centre). To avoid another botched raid, Chan has the public removed from the building, and brings in the gang members' parents. Joe kills gang member Max for surrendering. Frank injures Fire before retreating from Joe's gunfire. Chan has hand-to-hand combat with Tin Tin before Tin Tin is shot by Joe's friendly fire. Chan follows Joe to the roof, where Joe threatens to throw Frank to his death. Joe challenges Chan to a race to assemble a semi-automatic pistol, which Chan wins by loading the bullet directly into the chamber.

The police arrive on the roof along with Joe's father. Chan attempts to persuade Joe into surrendering; Joe admits defeat, but aims his empty gun at Chan and then his father, choosing suicide by cop. Chan rushes to rescue Frank, and both of them fall from the building onto a fireman's inflated cushion. Joe's father resigns. In the hospital, Ho Yee has recovered and accepts Chan's marriage proposal. Frank is arrested for assumption of authority. Chan remembers comforting the orphan Frank as a child after Frank's father was killed by a truck while trying to steal food, prompting Frank to become a policeman and repay Chan.

== Cast ==
- Jackie Chan as Chief Inspector Chan Kwok-wing
- Nicholas Tse as Frank Cheng Siu-fung, Chan's partner and fake policeman
- Charlie Yeung as Sun Ho-yee
- Charlene Choi as Sa Sa, Constable
- Daniel Wu as Joe Kwan
- Dave Wong as Sam Wong Sum
- Andy On as Law Tin-tin
- Terence Yin as Fire
- Hayama Go as Max Leung
- Coco Chiang as Sue Chow
- Yu Rongguang as Chief Inspector Chiu Chan
- Chun Sun as Joe Kwan's father & Deputy Commissioner of Police
- Lui Yau-wai as Joe Kwan's mother (as Lisa Lui)
- Lee Ting-fung – Joe Kwan at Age 6
- Lam Chi-tai as Thieves' lawyer
- Lee Tin-cgeung as Thieves' lawyer
- Lee Ji-kei as Max's father
- Luk Mei-ling as Max's mother
- Brenda Chan Kwai-fan as Thieves' parent
- Ken Ling Hiu-wa as Thieves' parent
- Wu Bai as Father of Frank Cheng
- Lau Ho-chun as Frank Cheng (aged 8)
- Liu Kai-chi as Superintendent Tai
- John Shum as Eric Chow
- Ken Lo as Kwong, Wing's team member
- Asuka Higuchi as Kwong's wife
- Steven Cheung as Green-haired thief
- Kenny Kwan as Red-haired thief
- Deep Ng as Hong, Wing's team member
- Tony Ho as Chui, Wing's team member
- Timmy Hung as Tin-ming, Wing's team member
- Sammy Hung as Tin-chiu, Wing's team member
- Carl Ng as Carl, Wing's team member
- Andrew Lin as Hoi, Wing's team member
- Samuel Pang as Sam, Wing's team member
- Philip Ng as Philip, Wing's team member
- Winnie Leung as Female Hostage
- Eric Kwok as Male Hostage
- Mandy Chiang as Chui's girlfriend
- Mak Bau as Negotiator
- Ringo Chen as Tourist
- Park Huyn-jin as Disco Bouncer
- Ng Kong as Disco Bouncer
- He Jun as Disco Bouncer
- Anthony Carpio as Disco Bouncer
- Chan Tat-kwong as Disco Bouncer
- Stephen Rohn as X-Game Player
- Stephen Julien as X-Game Player
- Ho Wai-yip as Police Officer Outside Convenience Store
- Audiotraffic – Jazz Bar Band
- Victy Wong as Cop
- Zac Koo as HKCEC Police man
- Stephen Bohn as X-Game Player
- Mars (extra) (uncredited)
- Roderick Lam as Sam's subordinate
- Jason Yip as Student's father
- Nic Yan as Detention Suspect

=== Jackie Chan stunt team ===
- Bradley James Allan
- Paul Andreovski
- Nicky Li
- Ken Lo
- Mars
- Wu Gang
- Park Hyun-jin
- He Jun
- Lee In-seob
- Han Kwan-hua

== Production ==
Principal photography took place in Hong Kong between September 2003 and December 2003.

== Box office ==
New Police Story opened in Hong Kong on 23 September 2004 where it made HK$5,625,746 in its first three days. It ended its run with HK$21 million to making it the fourth highest-grossing domestic release of the year.

The film received a limiting release in the United Kingdom on 13 October 2006. In its opening weekend the film grossed $19,332 having been shown in 16 theatres. It ranked #21 at the box office and averaged $1,208 per theatre. As of 22 October 2006, New Police Story had grossed a total of $33,404 in its two-week release in the UK. British television host and film critic Jonathan Ross gave the film a fairly positive review and felt that Chan could "still do the business".

== International version ==
New Police Story was released straight-to-DVD in the United States by Lionsgate on 16 May 2006. The DVD included an English dubbed with participation by Jackie Chan. Also included is an introduction by Jackie himself and a message not to buy an unlicensed copy of the film. When played in its original language it contains dubtitles. A cut was made towards the end of the film wherein a young Frank Cheng was being escorted back to the PRC by Chan.

A Blu-ray version was released in the United States on 24 November 2009.

== Awards and nominations ==
Awards and nominations
Ceremony	Category	Recipient	Outcome
24th Annual Hong Kong Film Awards	Best Film	New Police Story	Nominated
24th Annual Hong Kong Film Awards	Best Director	Benny Chan	Nominated
24th Annual Hong Kong Film Awards	Best Actor	Jackie Chan	Nominated
24th Annual Hong Kong Film Awards	Best Supporting Actor	Daniel Wu	Nominated
24th Annual Hong Kong Film Awards	Best Editing	Yau Chi-wai	Nominated
24th Annual Hong Kong Film Awards	Best Action Choreography	Jackie Chan Stunt Team, Nicky Li	Nominated
24th Annual Hong Kong Film Awards	Best Sound Effects	Kinson Tsang	Nominated
24th Annual Hong Kong Film Awards	Best Visual Effects	Wong Won-tak, Ho Chi-fai	Nominated
41st Annual Golden Horse Awards	Best Supporting Actor	Daniel Wu	Won
41st Annual Golden Horse Awards	Best Action Choreography	Jackie Chan Stunt Team, Nicky Li	Nominated
41st Annual Golden Horse Awards	Best Editing	Yau Chi-wai	Nominated
41st Annual Golden Horse Awards	Best Art Direction	Wong Ching-ching, Choo Sung-pong, Oliver Wong	Nominated
41st Annual Golden Horse Awards	Best Visual Effects	Victor Wong, Brian Ho	Nominated
41st Annual Golden Horse Awards	Best Sound Effects	Kinson Tsang	Nominated
41st Annual Golden Horse Awards	Audience Choice Award	New Police Story	Won

== Sequel ==
On 14 March 2023, a sequel to the film, titled New Police Story 2 was announced at the Hong Kong FILMART to be in development with stars Jackie Chan, Nicholas Tse, Daniel Wu, and Charlene Choi returning while Chan will also serve as producer and Tse will also serve as director.

== See also ==
- Crime Story
- The Protector
- SPL: Sha Po Lang
- List of Hong Kong films
- Jackie Chan filmography
