= House of Fury =

2005 Hong Kong film by Stephen Fung

- Theatrical release poster
- Directed by: Stephen Fung; Yuen Woo-ping (action); Yuen Shun-yee (action)
- Written by: Stephen Fung; Lo Yiu-fai
- Produced by: Willie Chan; Jackie Chan; Solon So
- Starring: Stephen Fung; Anthony Wong; Gillian Chung; Charlene Choi; Jon Foo; Michael Wong; Daniel Wu; Philip Ng
- Cinematography: Poon Hang-sang; Ray Wong; Davy Tsou
- Edited by: Cheung Ka-Fai
- Music by: Peter Kam
- Distributed by: Emperor Entertainment Group; JCE Movies Limited
- Release date: 24 March 2005
- Running time: 102 minutes
- Country: Hong Kong
- Languages: Cantonese; English

House of Fury (Chinese: 精武家庭) is a 2005 Hong Kong martial arts comedy film written and directed by Stephen Fung, who also co-stars in the film, and executive produced by Jackie Chan. The film stars Anthony Wong, Michael Wong and Gillian Chung. The film was released in Hong Kong on 24 March 2005. House of Fury features a collaboration between Anthony Wong and Michael Wong, reuniting them for the first time since 1998's Beast Cops.

== Plot ==
Terry Yue Siu-bo is a single father who single-handedly raises his two children, Natalie and Nicky, to young adulthood after his wife's death. Nicky works as a dolphin trainer at Ocean Park and Natalie goes to school with Ella, Nicky's girlfriend. Natalie's boyfriend, Jason, is a musician who does not speak Cantonese very well and, in his first scene, gives Natalie a pet pig. Siu-bo works as a traditional Chinese bonesetter and has kung fu skills, which he has passed on to his children, who display prowess while fighting each other in sibling disputes. Siu-bo tells exaggerated stories to his children and their friends, but they do not believe him.

Rocco, a wheelchair-using ex-CIA Agent out for revenge, kidnaps Siu-bo and demands information about a former spy whom Siu-bo knew. Siu-bo refuses to tell him, and Rocco threatens to harm his children if he does not give in. During this time, Uncle Chiu discovers Siu-bo's shop trashed and calls up Nicky to tell him of his father's disappearance. Finding a secret room at the back of his shop, Nicky finds out about his father's past as a G4 officer assigned to protect former spies.

Meanwhile, Siu-bo is injected with truth serum by Rocco's men, and in his degraded mental state, he reveals that he hid memory cards containing data about former spies in the lucky charms of his children. Rocco sends agents to Natalie, who is acting in a play, but Nicky manages to get to her and escape with some help from Ella and Jason.

As they hide out in Jason's house, Natalie finds out about the memory card in her charm and has Jason try to open it. They then find out that Natalie's card needs the other memory card to function, but Nicky, in his haste, left it in his locker at the park. Nicky and Natalie then attempt to get it during the dead of night, but are intercepted by two of Rocco's minions. After defeating the minions, a phone rings, and they get into direct contact with Rocco, who threatens their father's death if they do not help him in his quest for revenge. Rocco gives them one day to find the agent from his past.

Nicky and Natalie get back to Jason's house and find out that they require voice authentication from their father to access the file. Jason works through the night to create a file that would match Siu-bo's voice. During this time, Siu-bo attempts to escape but is foiled by Rocco's son, who is extremely adept with a bo staff. Jason finishes the file and is finally able to access the database. They find out that Rocco's target is actually Uncle Chiu, who turns out to be the same agent that left Rocco paralyzed and captured him. Nicky and Natalie try to leave to recover their father and find Uncle Chiu, but Jason traps them in his studio and reveals that he is Siu-bo's co-agent and does not want them to get hurt. He also reveals that his romantic intentions with Natalie are real, and not just a cover story.

Jason makes his way to Uncle Chiu with a plan to relocate him, which the old Uncle seemingly accepts, asking for a final moment to spend with his granddaughter. However, Uncle Chiu then attempts to escape from Jason by climbing and running across rooftops. Meanwhile, the siblings manage to find an air vent to escape from Jason's trap, and follow Jason to Uncle Chiu's restaurant. Jason chases Uncle Chiu, but injures his ankle while attempting to jump between buildings and is barely saved from falling to his death by a fire hose thrown out by Uncle Chiu. Nicky and Natalie catch up to Uncle Chiu, and ask him for help in saving their father. He relents, and Jason calls Nicky to throw him his car's keys, so they can get Uncle Chiu to Rocco in time.

Nicky and Natalie take a boat to Rocco's lair, and demand to see their father. Rocco reveals him to be trapped in a tank rapidly emptying of air, and rebuffs them without the agent he is looking for. Uncle Chiu shows up, and Rocco calls in his men to kill them. They fight their way through everyone, with Natalie breaking out Siu-bo and Nicky saving Uncle Chiu from a killing blow and defeating Rocco's son. Nicky leaves Rocco unharmed after he makes him fall off his wheelchair, and everyone manages to leave Rocco's lair alive. In the ending scene, Jason comes to Siu-bo's home to apologize to Natalie, which she accepts. Nicky finally gets the courage to have a French kiss with Ella, and Siu-bo and Uncle Chiu play a game of chess, with Chiu's granddaughter watching.

== Cast ==
- Anthony Wong – Terry Yue Siu-bo
- Stephen Fung – Nicky Yue
- Gillian Chung – Natalie Yue
- Charlene Choi – Ella
- Daniel Wu – Jason
- Michael Wong – Rocco
- Josie Ho – GJ (Rocco's fighter)
- Wu Ma – Uncle Chiu
- Winnie Leung Man-yee – Tank
- Jon Foo – John (Rocco's fighter)
- Philip Ng – King (Rocco's fighter)
- Jake Strickland – Nelson (Rocco's son)
- Chen Hu – Tiger (Rocco's fighter)
- Lee Ka-ting – Tortured Man
- Dick Tung Wai-keung – Headmaster
- Yau Chi-wang – Young Nicky
- Law Kar-ying – Cab Driver
- Yuen Man-jun – Teacher
- Chan Siu-gwan – Edward (Rocco's fighter)
- Jason Tobin – Rocco's fighter
- Higuchi Asuka – Rocco's fighter
- Lo Po-shan – Rocco's fighter
- Victy Wong Yin-keung – Rocco's fighter
- Mak Hon-gei – Rocco's fighter
- Chan Siu-wah – Rocco's fighter
- Wong Wai-fai – Rocco's fighter
- Yee Tin-hung – Rocco's fighter
- Wong Kim-ban – Rocco's fighter

== Release & Reception ==
On 22 June 2009, DVD was released by Cine Asia in a two-disc ultimate edition at the United Kingdom in Region 2.

In the review at Blu-Ray.com, Svet Atanasov criticized the film for its "awkward" combination of comedy and serious action scenes, but praised Anthony Wong's performance and remarked that the film is "watchable, I would say even entertaining".
