= A Chinese Tall Story =

2005 Hong Kong film by Jeffrey Lau

- Film poster
- Directed by: Jeffrey Lau
- Screenplay by: Jeffrey Lau
- Based on: Journey to the West by Wu Cheng'en
- Produced by: Albert Lee; Wang Zhenliang; James Wang
- Starring: Nicholas Tse; Charlene Choi; Fan Bingbing; Chen Bolin; Kenny Kwan; Steven Cheung
- Cinematography: Peter Ngor
- Edited by: Wong Wing-ming
- Music by: Joe Hisaishi
- Production companies: Huayi Brothers; Emperor Motion Pictures; China Film Group
- Distributed by: Emperor Motion Pictures
- Release date: 22 December 2005
- Running time: 103 minutes
- Country: Hong Kong
- Languages: Cantonese; Mandarin
- Box office: $1.3 million

A Chinese Tall Story (Chinese: 情癲大聖; Cantonese Yale: Ching din dai sing) is a 2005 Hong Kong fantasy adventure film written and directed by Jeffrey Lau. The story is loosely based on the 16th-century novel Journey to the West.

== Plot ==
Tang Sanzang and his three disciples Sun Wukong, Zhu Wuneng, and Sha Wujing arrive to a hero's welcome in Shache city.

During their stay in the city, the three disciples are captured by evil Tree Spirits. Tripitaka borrows the Golden Pole and tries to find a way to save them. He meets a young lizard imp Meiyan, who is more than a visual match for Quasimodo with her matted bushy hair and frightening teeth. Meiyan falls in love with Tripitaka at first sight and devotes herself to trailing him. She even sets a love trap to ensnare him. Tripitaka unwittingly falls into the trap and in the process breaks the Heavenly Code.

The region is one full of monsters, strange beings and creatures of unknown origins and among them are the beautiful Princess Xiaoshan and her army. On a passing journey to Earth, her path crosses Tripitaka's and she vows her aid. Tripitaka decides to leave with the Princess.

Meiyan is heartbroken. She picks a fight with Princess Xiaoshan and, although she loses, she finally discovers her own identity as a galactic warrior. She eventually helps the princess in defeating the enemy and rescues Tripitaka and his disciples.

After the battle, Meiyan surrenders to the Temple of Heaven for judgment. Torn between passion and righteousness, Tripitaka rebels against the heavens to rescue the gallows-bound Meiyan. A benevolent Buddha is moved and pardons the two on condition that they embark on a journey to the West to accomplish the Eight-One Tasks to redeem themselves and save the world.

== Cast ==
- Nicholas Tse as Tang Sanzang
- Charlene Choi as Yue Meiyan
- Fan Bingbing as Princess Xiaoshan
- Chen Bolin as Sun Wukong
- Kenny Kwan as Zhu Bajie
- Steven Cheung as Sha Wujing
- Isabella Leong as Red Child
- Patrick Tam
- Yuen Wah as Turtle
- Kenny Bee
- Tats Lau
- Yat-fei Wong
- Lee Kin-yan
- Joe Phua
- Michael Chan
- Gordon Liu
- Kara Hui

== Soundtrack ==
A Chinese Tall Story

Soundtrack album by Joe Hisaishi
- Released: 22 December 2005
- Length: 62:00
- Label: Emperor Entertainment Group

All compositions by Joe Hisaishi.

1. "Sacred Love"
2. "Prologue - Triumphant Entrance"
3. "Dogfight Over Shache"
4. "Words Are Lethal"
5. "Rout of the Four Heavenly Knights"
6. "Lover's Gambit"
7. "Longing for You"
8. "Yours Truly, Tripitaka"
9. "The Conspiracy"
10. "Capitulation"
11. "Twirling Snow"
12. "Alien Invasion"
13. "I Can Fly!"
14. "Help Is on the Way"
15. "Annihilation of the Tree Spirit"
16. "The Princess's Secret"
17. "Storming of the Celestial Court"
18. "I Know"
19. "Divine Manifestation"
20. "A Journey West"
