= Passion (Sammi Cheng album) =

Studio album by Sammi Cheng
- Released: 22 November 1996
- Recorded: August 1996 – October 1996
- Genre: Pop; dance-pop; pop rock; ballad
- Length: 48:02
- Language: Cantonese
- Label: Warner Music Hong Kong
- Producer: Conrad Wong, Mahmood Rumjahn, Stanley Leung

Sammi Cheng chronology
Worth It (1996)	Passion (1996)	It's Time@Don't Want:35 Songs, Old and New (1996)

Singles from Passion
- 1. "X Party"; 2. "Tacit Moment (From "Feel 100% 2")"; 3. "Sister Theresa"; 4. "Talk About Love"; 5. "Passion"; 6. "Hesitation"

Passion (Cantonese: 濃情) is the eleventh studio album and tenth Cantonese-language album by Hong Kong singer Sammi Cheng, released on 22 November 1996 by Warner Music Hong Kong, The album showcased a more mature and emotionally resonant sound, blending Cantopop with elements of pop rock and adult contemporary. In Hong Kong, the album achieved commercial success, receiving double platinum certification from the IFPI (Hong Kong Group) for two consecutive years, amounting to a total of Quadruple platinum, with sales surpassing 200,000 copies. In addition, the album's success led Singaporean media to refer to Cheng as a doyenne of the Hong Kong music scene. Beginning with this release, all of Cheng's Cantonese-language albums—aside from her Mandarin releases—also began charting on Singapore's SPVA Top 10 Album Sales Chart.

== Composition ==
The album incorporates a range of contemporary Cantopop styles, blending sentimental ballads, dance-pop, Latin pop with Pop Rock tracks, with lyrical themes of passion, vulnerability, and emotional growth. Cheng worked with several producers and songwriters, including Andrew Cheung, Vicky Fung,Terry Chan, Bryan Chen, Conrad Wong, Stanley Leung, Mahmood Rumjahn, Terry Chan and Sally Yeh.

== Promotion ==
Prior to the album's release, several tracks from Passion were performed live during Cheng's debut solo concert series, TCBY Sammi X Live 96, which consisted of eight shows held at the Hong Kong Coliseum from 10 to 17 November 1996. Although the album had not yet been officially released, songs such as “X Party” （X派對）and “Tacit Moment” （默契）were featured in the concert setlist, serving as early previews for the audience and generating anticipation for the upcoming release.

On the day of the album's release, Warner Music held a press conference titled “1,000,000 Passion” to promote Passion and highlighted Cheng's cumulative sales achievements under Warner Music.Her studio albums had collectively sold over 1,000,000 copies across Hong Kong and Taiwan. Among them, Can't Let You Go (捨不得你） and Never Want to Give You Up (放不低） had sold a combined total of 350,000 copies in Hong Kong and 50,000 copies in Taiwan. As of November 1996, Worth It (值得) had sold more than 450,000 copies in Taiwan and over 30,000 copies in Hong Kong. Additionally, Passion received over 100,000 pre-orders upon release.

The track “Tacit Moment” was not only used as the theme song for the film Feel 100%... Once More, were performed by Cheng. in which Cheng herself starred, but was also featured in a commercial for Panasonic Discman, which helped it reach a wider audience.

== Singles ==
In Hong Kong, Five singles were released from the album. The first four, "X Party", "Tacit Moment"(From "Feel 100% 2"), "Sister Theresa",and "Talk About Love", are commercial singles intended for radios, TVs, and karaoke bars. The last Two, "Passion" and "Hesitation" are promotional singles intended solely for karaoke bars.

"X Party" was chosen as the album's lead single, topping three major charts. "Tacit Moment" (From "Feel 100% 2") was released as the second single, peaking at number one on three major charts. "Sister Theresa" was released as the third single, "Talk About Love" was released as the fourth and final commercial single, reaching number one on Two major charts.

== Accolades ==
Award	Year	Recipient(s) and nominee(s)	Category	Notes	Ref.
1996 JSG Selections 4th Quarter	1996	"Tacit Moment" (默契)	Top 10 Songs (十大金曲)		
1996 Jade Solid Gold Best Ten Music Awards Presentation	January 12, 1997	"Tacit Moment" (默契)	Top 10 Songs (十大金曲)		
1996 Jade Solid Gold Best Ten Music Awards Presentation	January 12, 1997	Herself	The Most Popular Female Artist (最受歡迎女歌星)		
1997 JSG Selections Ist Quarter	1997	"Talk About Love" (談情說愛)	Top 10 Songs (十大金曲)		
104 FM Select Golden Heart Awards Presentation 1996	February 14, 1997	"Tacit Moment" (默契)	Top Ten Golden Heart Love Songs (十大精選金心情歌)		
104 FM Select Golden Heart Awards Presentation 1996	February 14, 1997	Herself	Golden Heart Female Vocalist (Diamond Award) (金心女歌手(鑽石獎))		
Yes!Hong Kong Pop Song Chart Awards Presentation 1996	January 1997	"X Party" (X派對)	No. 5 Song among the Top Ten Songs –5,472 votes (十大金曲第五名)		
Yes!Hong Kong Pop Song Chart Awards Presentation 1996	January 1997	Herself	Favorite Female Artist (最受歡迎女歌手獎)		
Fairchild Radio 1996 Canadian Chinese Pop Music Awards	January 1997	"X Party" (X派對)	the Most Popular Song (北美至HIT中文歌曲)		

Publication	Accolade	Ref.
Gold Disc Award presented 1997	Local Double Platinum Disc	
Gold Disc Award presented 1998	Local Double Platinum Disc	

== Chart performance ==
Passion debuted at number one on IFPI (Hong Kong Group). It stayed in the chart for 11 weeks.

== Track listing ==
Credits adapted from the album's liner notes.

Passion – Hong Kong Standard edition
No.	Title	Length
1.	"X Party"	3:47
2.	"Passion"	3:56
3.	"Don’t Want to Be Sexy"	3:41
4.	"Tacit Moment (From "Feel 100% 2")"	3:43
5.	"Almost Certain"	3:35
6.	"Final Success"	3:48
7.	"Rest Assured"	4:16
8.	"Earth-shattering"	3:52
9.	"Sister Theresa"	4:44
10.	"Talk About Love"	4:09
11.	"Hesitation"	4:29
12.	"Innermost Feelings"	4:07
Total length:		40:28

== Charts ==
Chart (1996)	Peak position
Hong Kong Albums (IFPI)	1

== Sales and certifications ==
Region	Certification	Certified units/sales
Hong Kong (IFPI Hong Kong)	4× Platinum	200,000

== Release history ==
List of formats and editions of the album being released in each country, along with the date of the release
Country	Date	Format	Label	Edition	Ref.
Hong Kong	22 November 1996	CD	Warner Music Hong Kong	Hong Kong Edition	
Hong Kong	22 November 1996	Cassette tape	Warner Music Hong Kong	Hong Kong Edition	
Taiwan	22 November 1996	CD	UFO Group (Taiwan)	Taiwanese Edition	
Taiwan	22 November 1996	Cassette tape	UFO Group (Taiwan)	Taiwanese Edition	
Singapore	22 November 1996	CD	Warner Music Singapore	Singaporean Edition	
Singapore	22 November 1996	Cassette tape	Warner Music Singapore	Singaporean Edition	
Malaysia	22 November 1996	CD	Warner Music Malaysia	Malaysian Edition	
Malaysia	22 November 1996	Cassette tape	Warner Music Malaysia	Malaysian Edition	
Indonesia	22 November 1996	CD	Warner Music Indonesia	Malaysian Import	
Indonesia	22 November 1996	Cassette tape	Warner Music Indonesia	Malaysian Import	
Canada	30 November 1996	CD	Warner Music	Hong Kong Import	
Canada	30 November 1996	Cassette tape	Warner Music	Hong Kong Import	
South Korea	30 November 1996	CD	Warner Music Korea	Korean Edition	
South Korea	30 November 1996	Cassette tape	Warner Music Korea	Korean Edition	
Hong Kong	February 28, 2001	CD	Warner Music Hong Kong	The Best Sound of Warner Music HDCD Remaster Series	
Taiwan	January 15, 2002	CD	Warner Music Taiwan	Reissue	
Hong Kong	March 4, 2011	CD	Warner Music Hong Kong	Gold Disc, Warner+EMI Golden Reissue Series	
Taiwan	October 25, 2013	CD	Warner Music Taiwan	Gold Disc,Warner+EMI Golden Reissue Series	
