= Sammi Cheng =

Hong Kong singer and actress (born 1972)

- 鄭秀文
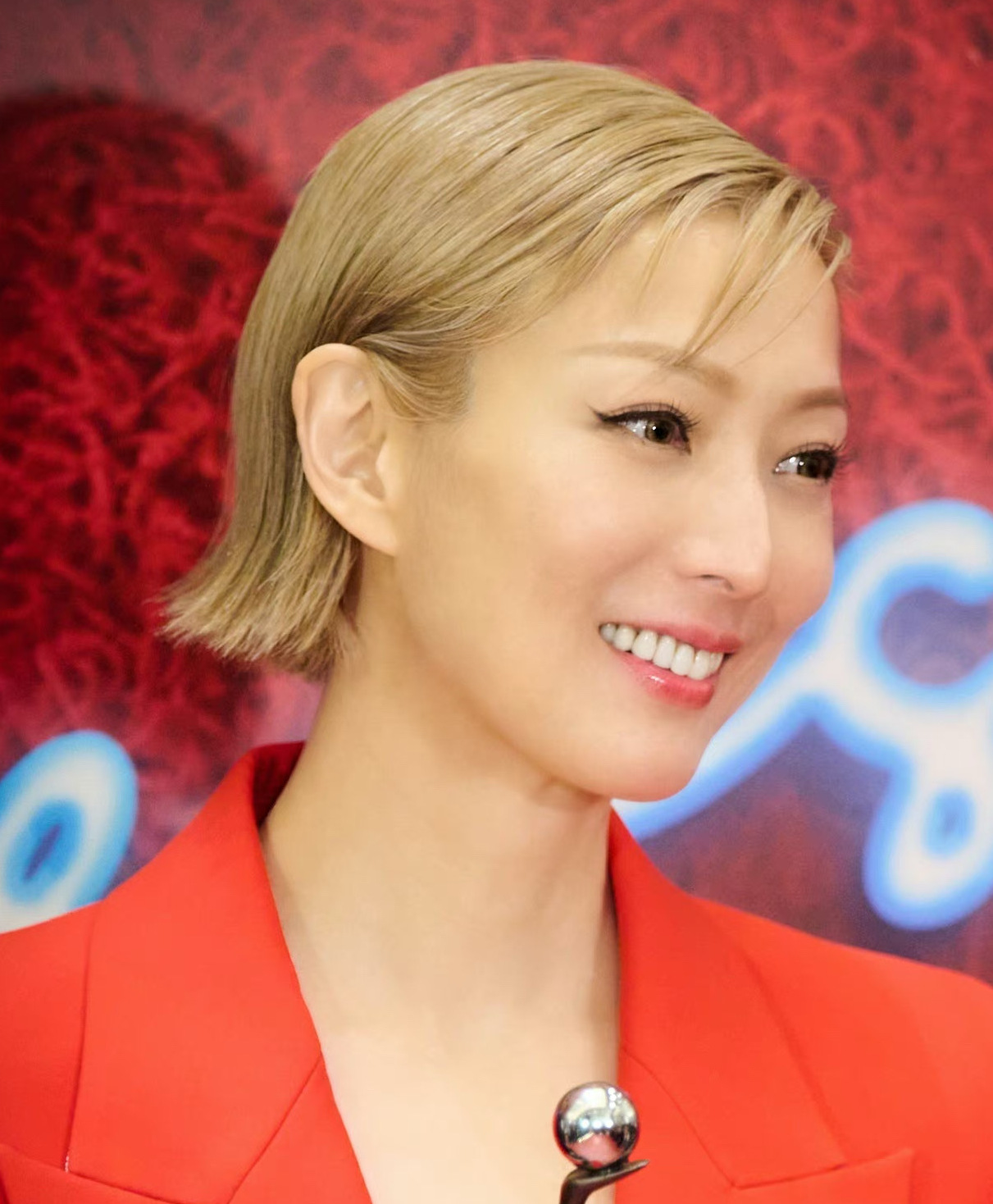
- Cheng in 2023
- Born: 19 August 1972 (age 54); British Hong Kong
- Other name: Mi
- Occupations: Singer; actress
- Years active: 1988–present
- Spouse: Andy Hui (m. 2013)
- Musical career
- Genres: Cantopop; Mandopop
- Instrument: Vocals
- Labels: Capital Artists (1988–1995); Warner Music Group (1995–2005); East Asia Entertainment Ltd. (2005–2012); Media Asia Entertainment (2013–present)

Chinese name
- Traditional Chinese: 鄭秀文
- Simplified Chinese: 郑秀文
Transcriptions
Standard Mandarin
- Hanyu Pinyin: Zhèng Xiùwén
- IPA: [ʈʂə̂ŋ ɕjôʊ.wə̌n]
Yue: Cantonese
- Yale Romanization: Jehng Sau-màhn
- Jyutping: Zeng6 Sau3-man4
- IPA: [tsɛŋ˨ sɐw˧ mɐn˩]

Sammi Cheng Sau-man (Chinese: 鄭秀文; pinyin: Zhèng Xiùwén; born 19 August 1972) is a Hong Kong singer and actress. She is one of the most prominent female singers in Hong Kong, with album sales of over 25 million copies throughout the Asia-pacific. Most notably in the 1990s, she was dubbed by the media as the "Cantopop Diva". Having success in entertainment industry for over three decades, Cheng also played roles in Hong Kong rom-com films in the early 2000s that were box office hits. For her performance in the 2022 film Lost Love, she won 4 best actress honors including the Hong Kong Film Award for Best Actress.

Since her debut, Cheng has won the IFPI Hong Kong Music Top Sales Awards for the best-selling Local Female Vocalist of the Year nine times. From 1993 to 2010, Cheng won a total of 12 Top Female Vocalist awards, 14 Best-selling Local Female Vocalist Awards and has 7 albums that are the Best-selling Cantonese Release of the Year.She was even officially recognized six times as the best-selling Hong Kong female artist of the year in Malaysia, including in 2000 and 2001, when she also became the overall best-selling C-Pop female artist in the country; seven times in Taiwan; eight times in Singapore, including in 1996–1997, 1999, 2000, and 2004, when she became the overall best-selling C-Pop female artist in the country; and seven times in North America during 1996–2002 as the overall best-selling C-Pop female artist of the year. She holds the records for the most cumulative weeks at No.1 on both the HKRMA album and video album sales charts, and is also the female artist with the most number-one albums in Hong Kong album sales chart history. She had also previously won the Most Popular Hong Kong Female Artist Award in annual Top Ten Jade Solid Gold Awards Presentation for three times, and in a year winning also the Gold Song Gold Award, the highest-ranked award which is the last to be presented at the ceremony. She also received Honorary Lifetime Achievement Award for Female Singer in 2011 Metro Radio Hits Awards. She had also won many top honors in various Chinese music awards held in Asia, including the MTV Asia Award for Favorite Artist Hong Kong 3 times in 2002, 2003, and 2004.

She has produced over 80 studio albums, 10 live concert albums, over 130 songs with also over 30 cover songs and had received numerous awards from acting to singing. She also starred in close to 40 films and 7 television dramas and had held approximately 200 concerts up to date with over 11 concert tours. She is one of the female artists with most concert shows in Hong Kong Coliseum, at 115.

== Early life ==
Sammi Cheng was previously named Twinnie Cheng. Contrary to popular belief, "Twiny" is not her birth name. The name came about when Sammi was still in school and her English Language teacher wanted everyone in class to have an English name. When Sammi turned to her sister for help, her sister came up with the name "Twiny". The name was later changed to "Sammi" as "Sammi" sounds a little like "Sau Man". Cheng received her education at SKH St. Peter's Primary School and Tang Shiu Kin Victoria Government Secondary School.

She has three sisters and one brother. Two of her sisters are twins.

== Career ==
=== Music ===
Cheng entered the entertainment industry at the age of 16 through the New Talent Singing Awards in 1988. Although she came in third in the competition, the sponsoring record company Capital Artists saw her potential and offered her a recording contract. Cheng at the time was still in school, and had to balance her studies with her rising singing career. In December 1988, Sammi Cheng and David Lui recorded two songs—"Cherish This Moment" (珍惜這一刻) and "Chrysanthemum Tears" (菊花淚)—for the television drama series Deadly Secret.Sammi released 3 full-length studio albums prior to leaving school: "Sammi", "Holiday" and "Never Too Late". One of her first major awards was the 1990 RTHK Top 10 Gold Songs Awards, where she was recognized as a best new prospect.

==== 1990–1992: Eponymous debut album, Holiday and Never Too Late ====
In September 1990, Cheng released her debut album, Sammi, which sold 30,000 copies in Hong Kong —a respectable achievement for a newcomer. The lead single was "Longing" (思念), followed by "Loving You Still" (仍是你) as the second single. The third single was "Fascination" (迷情). The fourth single, "Disillusion" (幻滅)—a cover of the English song "A Long and Lasting Love"—and The final single was "Parting" (離別). As a newcomer under Capital Artists, Cheng did not receive a budget from the label to produce music videos, so the music videos for the first three singles were produced by a television station instead.In addition, this album earned Cheng the "Outstanding Newcomer" award at the 1990 RTHK Top 10 Gold Songs Awards. After receiving it, Cheng was widely praised for her strong potential. Music critic James Wong Jim (黃霑) commended her sweet voice, attractive appearance, and stage presence, while the media predicted that she would become one of Hong Kong's leading divas in the future.

On 18 June 1991, Cheng released her second studio album, Holiday. By this time, Cheng's vocal abilities had improved significantly, allowing her to handle several technically challenging songs with ease. The album was noted for its consistent style and distinctive image, which helped her gain moderate popularity for a period. The lead single, "The Season That Never Came " (不來的季節), topped two major music charts in Hong Kong. The second single, "Valentino," was featured as a recommended song on the TV program "Jade Solid Gold." The third and fourth singles were "Friends" and "Love Lost in Vienna" (情斷維也納), respectively. Her appearance in the television drama "A Life of His Own" (浪族闊少爺) boosted album sales, earning the album platinum certification with total sales reaching 70,000 copies in Hong Kong. Cheng's rising popularity in Hong Kong also brought her to the attention of Taiwanese audiences, with journalist Mai Ruoyu from Min Sheng Daily News praising her outstanding performance and noting that her new album reached number one on the charts. Cheng was described as a promising new star among leading female artists. The Cantonese album was also released in Taiwan, giving local fans an introduction to her music. Additionally, the album received positive reviews from Singaporean media, who commended her vocal quality, emotional delivery, and versatility, highlighting her ability to stand out among young newcomers.

In July 1992, Cheng released her third studio album, Never Too Late. For this album, Cheng departed from her previous youthful image by adopting a short hairstyle and more mature fashion, fully showcasing the charm of a sophisticated young woman. Due to its more sophisticated style, the singles from the album did not achieve the same chart success as those from her previous release, but the album still surpassed 60,000 copies and achieved platinum certification in Hong Kong. In addition, Cheng emerged as the most promising young female singer of her generation, widely regarded as a top contender to become the next diva of the Hong Kong music industry, and received the "Best Youthful Female Artist" award at Metro Radio's "Beauty Awards" for this album, The lead single was "Say U'll Be Mine." The second single was "Doll's View of the World" (娃娃看天下), followed by the third single, "I Don't Want to Leave Tonight" (這夜我不願離開). The fourth single was "2gether," the theme song for the TVB Japanese drama adaptation "Rookie Cops" (新紮俏警花), and the fifth single was "If You Love Me" (如愛我), an insert song for the drama File of Justice (壹號皇庭).

==== 1993–1994: Sammi Cheng's Happy Maze, Big Revenge, Ten Commandments, Time, Place, Person and Sammi ====
Cheng capitalized on the attention received from her duet with artist Andy Hui, "Do you really have me in your heart?" (其實你心裡有沒有我), winning the 1993 Jade Solid Gold Top 10 Awards with that song. Cheng then went through a transformation, dying her hair orange, changing her style. Her 4th studio album "Sammi's Happy Maze" (鄭秀文的快樂迷宮) was also released, which include the hit single "Chotto Matte" (Chotto 等等), meaning 'wait a moment' in Japanese. Her new image fitted well with the new single, which was a remake of a Japanese song by Maki Ohguro. The success helped Sammi and boosted her singing career. In 1994 she continued to capitalize on her wild, new image. Her first album of that year was "Big Revenge" (大報復). The album included the hit "Ding Dong" (叮噹), which became one of Sammi's signature songs. But with her new fame also came a lot of backlash from the media. Critics argued that Cheng purposely westernized her Cantonese. Instead of saying "Ding Dong", Sammi pronounced it as "Deen Dong". Despite the criticism, the song was one of the most popular dance songs of that year. In 1994 the racy and controversial cut of "Ten Commandments" (十誡) was banned from the radio for a few days after its initial airplay of the track including tiny bits of what can be recognized as pornography soundtrack. In 1995 Cheng disappeared from the public eye for nearly half a year. Later that year, it was revealed that Warner Music Group had signed her. She let her hair color return to black and temporarily abandoned the wild image she used to have.

==== 1995–1996: After, Can't Let You Go, Never Want to Give You Up, Worth It and Passion ====
In late 1994, Cheng chose not to renew her contract with Capital Artists, following an eight-month period of inactivity during which the label placed her career on hold. After completing this hiatus, she released After (其後) on 25 August 1995, her final album under Capital Artists. To promote the album, the label organized a public autograph session and placed promotional advertisements in Apple Daily. However, due to Cheng's swift transition to Warner Music shortly after the album's release, the promotional period was notably brief. The album's experimental nature and less commercial sound also contributed to its modest initial sales performance. Nevertheless, following her signing with Warner Music and subsequent resurgence in popularity, the album later attracted renewed commercial interest.

In September 1995, Cheng officially signed with Warner Music Group. One month after Cheng's departure from Capital Artists, Capital Artists' general manager Ng Yu, noting her renewed surge in popularity, released a compilation album titled It's time:18 Songs, Old and New (是時候新舊對照18首) on 26 October 1995. Initially priced at HK$88, the album contained two previously unreleased tracks. The release was met with strong response, debuting at number one on the IFPI Top 10 Albums Sales Chart and ultimately accumulating sales surpassing double platinum. In November 1996, Capital Artists' general manager Ng Yu acknowledged that although Cheng had already left Capital Artists, her compilations had generated substantial revenue.

On 18 November of the same year, she released her first Cantonese-language studio album under Warner Music Group, "Can't Let You Go" (捨不得你). The album was widely regarded by media and industry observers as marking Cheng's rise to diva status in the Hong Kong music scene. It topped the IFPI (Hong Kong Group) Top 10 Album Sales Chart and was officially certified triple platinum by IFPI (Hong Kong Group) and the Hong Kong Record Merchants Association on 22 November 1996, with total sales reaching 175,000 copies. It became one of the best-selling albums in the Hong Kong market that year. "Hey! Man!" (男仕今天你很好) was chosen as the album's lead single, topping four major charts.The second single, "Can't Let You Go" (捨不得你) was featured in a Panasonic portable CD player television commercial, in which Cheng also starred. It likewise reached No. 1 across four major broadcast charts and topped the karaoke chart in Hong Kong for 16 consecutive weeks, leading to her being dubbed the Karaoke Queen by fans and media. The third single was "I Love You Fall Ever" (秋冬愛的故事), followed by the fourth single, "The Elegy of Love" (愛的輓歌), which served as a theme song for the television drama Detective Investigation Files II. The fifth single was "A Glass of Tequila" (Tequila一杯).

On 19 December of the same year, Warner Music released Cheng's first Remix EP, Can't Let You Go (Remix) (捨不得你 Remix), to celebrate the album's commercial success. It featured newly recorded remix versions as well as her first Mandarin-language song, Can't Let You Go (Mandarin Version) (捨不得你(國語版)). It had already been included in the Southeast Asia edition of Can't Let You Go (捨不得你), released in November, and received a strong market response, quickly becoming a popular song at karaoke bars in Singapore, Malaysia, and Taiwan. This significantly boosted Cheng's recognition in those countries, paving the way for her expansion into the Mandarin pop market the following year.

On 29 May 1996, Cheng released her second Cantonese-language studio album under Warner Music Group," Never Want to Give You Up"(放不低）. It debuted at number one on IFPI (Hong Kong Group) Top 10 Album Sales Chart, maintained that position for one week and was officially certified triple platinum by IFPI (Hong Kong Group) and the Hong Kong Record Merchants Association on 22 November 1996, with total sales reaching 175,000 copies. making it the best-selling Cantonese album by a female artist that year.The album was also twice shortlisted for Taiwan's Golden Melody Dragon Tiger Chart, appearing in the fourth and fifth weeks of the autumn season, with sales in Taiwan reaching 30,000 copies."Beware of Woman" (小心女人) was chosen as the album's lead single, topping four major charts. It immediately became a major hit in Hong Kong, with Cheng's trendy styling for the song sparking widespread discussion and later inspiring similar looks among other artists. The second single, "Never Want to Give You Up" (放不低）, peaking at number one on three major charts. it was used as the theme song for the TV drama "When a Woman Loves a Man" and was also featured in a commercial for Panasonic Discman, which helped it reach a wider audience. Around the same time, Cheng starred in the film Feel 100% (百分百感覺), for which she performed the theme songs "Owe You Nothing" (不拖不欠) and "Asking Me" (問我). Both tracks became popular hits, with "Owe You Nothing" also released as the album's third single, reaching number one on one major chart, topping karaoke chart for eight consecutive weeks. On 24 June 1996, to celebrate the album's rapid achievement of double platinum certification within one weeks, Cheng released her second Remix EP, Beware of Woman Kara EP Remix (小心女人卡拉EP Remix).

In 1996, the company decided it was time for Cheng to expand her market and fan base beyond Hong Kong. In August 1996, Sammi Cheng, with auburn-colored hair, entered the Taiwanese market under the titles of "Hong Kong's new diva" and "successor to the diva throne." On 2 September 1996, she released her first Mandarin-language studio album,"Worth It" (值得). The album immediately reached number one on the Taiwan IFPI sales chart, where it remained for six consecutive weeks. On 11 October, it was certified by IFPI Taiwan as platinum and gold, with sales of 309,489 copies, making Cheng the first artist to receive a chart-topping certificate since the organization's establishment. By early December, sales had reached 500,000 copies, ranking fourth among Taiwan's ten best-selling albums of 1996. By early 1997, cumulative sales had risen to 600,000, later surpassing 700,000 across Taiwan. By early 1997, Worth It had sold one million copies across Taiwan, Singapore, Malaysia, and North America (excluding Hong Kong and mainland China). In North America's Chinese communities alone, sales exceeded 200,000 copies, with the album repeatedly appearing on Virgin Megastore's top ten sales chart. According to Warner Music Asia's president in 1999, Worth It had sold 2.2 million copies across Asia (excluding North America and mainland China), making it Cheng's best-selling album of all time.

The album's lead single, "Worth It" (值得), topped multiple music charts and Karaoke charts across Mandarin-speaking regions. The second single, "Betray" (背叛), received stronger response in Hong Kong, earned the "Favorite Mandarin Song (至尊最愛國語歌)" award while the third single, "Depend On" (依靠), was also promoted. In addition, "Beware Of Woman (Mandarin version)" (小心女人) and "Fragile" (脆弱) were released as promotional singles, primarily promoted through karaoke bars in Taiwan.

In October 1996, Cheng announced her first solo concert, TCBY Sammi X Live 96 (TCBY鄭秀文X空間演唱會), to be held at the Hong Kong Coliseum. The concert ran for eight consecutive shows, with tickets selling out one month before the opening, setting a record for female singers at the Coliseum in 1996. Promoter Cheung Yiu-wing revealed that 90 percent of tickets were sold within three days, noting the strong response. Due to scheduling constraints, no additional shows could be added, but sixteen concerts were planned for 1997.

The eight concerts began on 10 November 1996, staged in a three-sided configuration at the newly renovated venue, accommodating more than 7,000 spectators each night. All eight shows were sold out, with three extra rows of seating added per performance, drawing a total audience of around 60,000. A live album was subsequently released, with the LD edition selling 50,000 copies and the CD edition receiving platinum certification from the IFPI (Hong Kong Group) for two consecutive years, reaching cumulative sales of 100,000 copies—the Best-selling live album by a female singer in Hong Kong during the 1990s. Cheng also received the "My Favorite Concert (我最喜愛的演唱會)" award, voted by more than 30,000 attendees.

Following the commercial success of her previous three albums, Cheng released Passion on 22 November 1996, shortly after her concert series, adopting a metropolitan and mature female image."X Party" (X派對) was chosen as the album's lead single, topping three major charts. "Tacit Moment" (From "Feel 100% 2") (默契) was released as the second single, peaking at number one on three major charts. "Sister Theresa"(加爾各答的天使－德蘭修女) was released as the third single, "Talk About Love" (談情說愛) was released as the fourth and final commercial single, reaching number one on Two major charts.On the day of the album's release, Warner Music held a press conference titled "1,000,000 Passion" to promote the record and highlight Cheng's cumulative sales achievements under the label. Her albums had collectively sold over one million copies in Hong Kong and Taiwan. Among them, Can't Let You Go (捨不得你） and Never Want to Give You Up (放不低） had sold a combined total of 350,000 copies in Hong Kong and 50,000 copies in Taiwan; as of November 1996, Worth It (值得) had sold more than 450,000 copies in Taiwan and over 30,000 copies in Hong Kong. In addition, advance orders for Passion exceeded 100,000 copies prior to its release. Ultimately, the album achieved renewed commercial success in Hong Kong, receiving double platinum certification from the IFPI (Hong Kong Group) for two consecutive years, amounting to a total of Quadruple platinum, with cumulative sales exceeding 200,000 copies

She won a number of awards, most notably she was voted back-to-back as the most popular female artist by TVB from 1996 to 1997. She went on to win the top female award again in 2001. She would finish that year with her first concert titled "Sammi's X-Dimension Concert" (鄭秀文X空間演唱會).

In 1998, she was also a featured star in a Heineken sponsored Music Horizons concert along with international singers such as Boyz II Men and Julian Lennon. By the time Cheng was 24 years old, she had already released four greatest hits albums.

==== 1999: Listen To Sammi,I Deserved and Love You Very Much ====
After reducing her workload in 1998 and encountering issues related to her manager’s departure from Warner Music Hong Kong and contract negotiations with the label, Cheng embarked on a renewed phase of her career in 1999. On 5 January of the same year, she released Listen To Sammi(聽聞), her first Cantonese-language studio album following her successful contract negotiations. On the very same day, Warner Music Hong Kong held a press conference titled Crossing into the 2000 Century (飛越2000世紀之約), at which Cheng officially announced her decision to renew her contract with the label for two years, valued at HK$35 million, and simultaneously promoted the album. It debuted at number one on the IFPI (Hong Kong Group), maintaining that position for one week, and stayed on the chart for 10 weeks. The album was certified double platinum by IFPI and the Hong Kong Record Merchants Association, with sales of 110,000 copies. In Malaysia, it debuted at number 6 on RIM chart, later reaching number one for two weeks, and stayed on the chart for fifteen weeks in total.In Singapore, it debuted at number two on SPVA Top 10 Albums of the Week. The album's lead single, "Wish You Happy (祝你快樂)", proved to be a massive commercial success. It topped five major charts, including the TVB JSG Billboard Top 10, RTHK Chinese Pop Chart, Hong Kong Big Echo Karaoke Chart, Fairchild Radio Canadian Chinese Pop Music Chart, and Sinocast Radio New York Top Ten Chinese Gold Songs Chart."My Pet(寵物)" served as the second single that matched its predecessor's success by topping seven major charts, including the TVB JSG Billboard Top 10, 997 Metro Hit Chart, RTHK Chinese Pop Chart, 903 Chart, Hong Kong Big Echo Karaoke Chart (where it recorded 298,900 karaoke requests within 20 days, ranking first across Hong Kong), Fairchild Radio Canadian Chinese Pop Music Chart, and Sinocast Radio New York Top Ten Chinese Gold Songs Chart.The third single,"The Right Lover （真命天子）" (Heaven Version) served as the theme song for the television drama Man's Best Friend, in which Cheng played the leading role. Although the track achieved modest success on the music charts—peaking at number five on the TVB JSG Billboard Top 10—it still garnered significant attention due to the drama's popularity."Loving You Is My Life's Ideal (愛你是我一生中的理想）" followed as the final commercial release from the project, topping the Fairchild Radio Canadian Chinese Pop Music Chart.

On 10 May 1999, Cheng released her third Mandarin-language studio album under Warner Music Group, I Deserved (我應該得到), following a two-year hiatus from the Mandopop market. Three days later, on 13 May at 8:00 pm, Warner Music Taiwan hosted a mini concert for the album titled the “I Deserved” Cheng New Songs Mini Concert ("我應該得到"鄭秀文新歌演唱會) at Nangang 101 in Taipei There, Cheng performed a mix of tracks from this release and her earlier hits. Commercially, I Deserved found steady success across Asia. In Hong Kong, it debuted at number five before peaking at number three on the IFPI (Hong Kong Group) Top 10 Album Sales Chart, and was subsequently certified Gold by both IFPI Hong Kong and the Hong Kong Record Merchants Association for sales of 40,000 copies, while cumulative sales eventually reached 100,000 by June 2001. The album also performed strongly in Taiwan, spending 14 weeks on the IFPI Taiwan Local Top 20—nine of which were in the top ten—and peaking at number three, ranking eighth among the ten best‑selling albums of 1999, with sales exceeding 550,000 copies, and consequently making Cheng the best-selling Hong Kong female artist in Taiwan that year. Meanwhile, in Singapore, it dominated the SPVA Top 10 chart for 35 weeks —including a six-week total at the top with a five-week consecutive run at number one —and ranked among the ten best-selling albums of 1999 with sales exceeding 70,000 copies, making Cheng the best-selling Hong Kong-born female artist in Singapore that year. By the end of its commercial run, the album achieved sales of 1.9 million copies across Asia.The album’s lead single, "Absence" (缺席), achieved significant commercial success, reaching the No. 1 position on eight major music charts across multiple regions, including the TVB8 Mandarin Music On Demand Top 10, 997 Metro Hit Chart, Yes! Hong Kong Pop Song Chart (where it held the No. 1 position for two weeks), Hong Kong Big Echo Karaoke Chart, Sinocast Radio New York Top Ten Chinese Gold Songs Chart, Singapore Dongli 88.3 Supreme Song Chart, Taiwan Hit FM Mandopop Chart, and Taiwan Cashbox Mandopop Karaoke Chart."Over the Border (出界)" was selected as the second single, spending eight consecutive weeks at the top of the Taiwan Cashbox Mandopop Karaoke Chart and also reaching number one on the Yes! Hong Kong Pop Song Chart. Serving as the third and final commercial single, "I Deserved" (我應該得到) peaked at number one on the Taiwan Cashbox Mandopop karaoke chart. and also reaching number one on the Yes! Hong Kong Pop Song Chart.

On 31 August 1999, Cheng announced Chase Sammi I Concert 99, her third solo concert at the Hong Kong Coliseum. Running for seven consecutive shows from 21 to 27 October 1999, it marked her first use of a four‑sided stage setup. Due to the economic downturn at the time, the concert was produced on a modest budget, with costumes kept simple. As a result of overwhelming demand, an additional performance was announced on 25 October and subsequently held on 30 October.

Following the commercial success of her previous two albums, Cheng released her fifteenth Cantonese-language studio album Love You Very Much(很愛很愛) on September 22, 1999, through Warner Music Group. The album debuted at number one on IFPI (Hong Kong Group) Top 10 Album Sales Chart, where it held the top position for one week and remained on the chart for a total of eight weeks; it was subsequently certified double platinum by IFPI and the Hong Kong Record Merchants Association, with sales reaching 100,000 copies. In Singapore, it debuted at number three on the SPVA Top 10 Albums of the Week, where it stayed on the chart for eight weeks and sold 29,000 copies. Ultimately, the album had sold a total of 450,000 copies across Asia.“Shinning （發熱發亮)” was released as the album’s lead single and served as the theme song for Cheng’s Chase Sammi I Concert 99. It peaked at number one on ten major charts, including the TVB JSG Billboard Top 10, RTHK Chinese Pop Chart, Metro Hit Chart, 903 Chart, Hong Kong Big Echo Karaoke Chart, Fairchild Radio Canadian Chinese Pop Music Chart, and Sinocast Radio New York Top Ten Chinese Gold Songs Chart. The second single, "Episode" (插曲）, reached number one on seven major charts, including the TVB JSG Billboard Top 10, 997 Metro Hit Chart, RTHK Chinese Pop Chart, 903 Chart, FM Select 104 chart, CR1 FM 88.1 chart (two consecutive weeks at number 1）, Hong Kong Big Echo Karaoke Chart (where it recorded 400,000 karaoke requests within 21 days, ranking first across Hong Kong), Fairchild Radio Canadian Chinese Pop Music Chart, and Sinocast Radio New York Top Ten Chinese Gold Songs Chart. The third single was "Fatalism" (宿命主義), followed by the fourth single, "Alternative Men and Women" (另類男女), which served as a theme song for the television drama Armed Reaction II.

With the combined sales of Listen to Sammi, I Deserved and Love You Very Much, which totaled 250,000 copies in Hong Kong, Cheng received the award for Best Sales Local Female Vocalist of 1999 from IFPI (Hong Kong Group), as well as the runner‑up position for Best-Selling Music Artist of 1999 presented by the Hong Kong Record Merchants Association.

On 22 December 1999, Cheng released two Greatest hits albums—the Cantonese-language Thank You: New Songs & Greatest Hits and the Mandarin-language Love Stories & New Century Selections—which marked her presence in both pop music markets at the turn of the millennium.

Thank You: New Songs & Greatest Hits debuted at number three on IFPI (Hong Kong Group) Top 10 Album Sales Chart, later peaking at number two, and remained on the chart for twelve weeks. with sales of 50,000 copies. In Taiwan, the album debuted at number two on the Golden Melody Dragon Tiger Chart — Top 20 Album Sales Chart. Before the establishment of IFPI Taiwan, sales data had also been referenced from this chart, and since the IFPI Taiwan Local Top 20 ceased publication in August 1999 due to rampant piracy, subsequent sales data were referenced from this chart instead. In Singapore, the album debuted at number ten on the SPVA Top 10 Albums of the Week.

Love Stories & New Century Selections was commercially successful in Singapore, where it debuted at number three on the SPVA Top 10 Albums of the Week, later peaking at number one for several weeks and ranking among the ten best-selling albums of 2000 with sales approaching 30,000 copies, making Cheng the best-selling Hong Kong female artist in Singapore that year. The album went on to sell 1.2 million copies across Asia (excluding mainland China), making it Cheng's best-selling Greatest hits album of all time.

==== 2003: Completely Yours... Sammi and Beautiful Misunderstanding ====
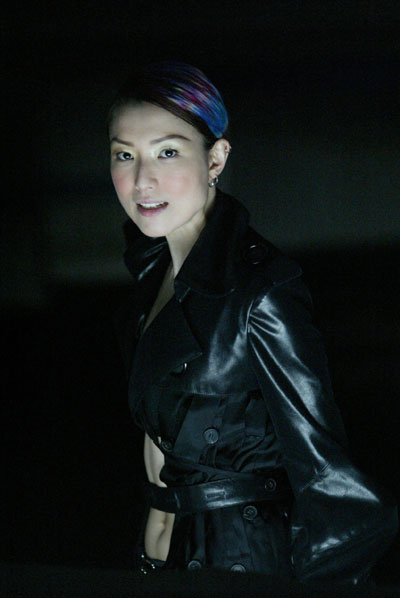
Cheng filming the music video for her single ‘Big Runaway’ (大暴走) in July 2003

In 2003, Cheng shifted her focus primarily to film, which led to a temporary decline in her music activities. On June 26, she released the greatest hits Album "Completely Yours... Sammi", featuring three new tracks: "Getting off Wrongly (落錯車)", "In Love with Your Bed (戀上你的床)", and "Big Runaway (大暴走)". Subsequently, to celebrate sales of the first edition exceeding 120,000 copies, a special edition was released on 28 August, featuring an additional track, "Xanadu (仙樂都)".The album topped the HMV Asia sales chart for two consecutive weeks， and achieved quadruple platinum status. It was initially expected to win the IFPI Hong Kong award for Best-Selling Cantonese Album of the Year. However, under the revised system introduced in 2001, the award was determined by total revenue rather than unit sales. As a result, Completely Yours... Sammi did not receive the honor. That year's best-selling release was a live album, which, under the new rules, combined sales of its video formats (VCD and DVD). Although its unit sales were comparable to Cheng's album, the higher retail price of live recordings meant its overall revenue surpassed Completely Yours... Sammi. Consequently, despite selling slightly more units, Cheng's release lost out due to lower total revenue. The album also performed strongly in Singapore, debuting at number six on the Singapore TOP 10 ALBUMS OF THE WEEK in its first week.

With sales exceeding 13,000 copies, it became the best-selling Cantonese-language album in Singapore that year.“Getting off Wrongly” (落錯車) was chosen as the album’s lead single, and it immediately became a karaoke hit in Hong Kong. However, because Cheng did not attend JSG Selections 2nd Quarter, she missed the opportunity to receive a Top Ten Songs Award. When asked by reporters at a fan convention, Cheng said she did not mind, emphasizing that the most important thing was that fans enjoyed the song. "Big Runaway "(大暴走) was released as the second single, peaking at number one on one major chart.

On October 31, Cheng released her final Mandarin-language album under Warner Music Taiwan, "Beautiful Misunderstanding". The Hong Kong edition included an additional Cantonese track, "Everyday I Love You Less and Less (每天愛你少一些)".As Cheng's contract with Warner Music Taiwan neared expiration, promotional efforts for Beautiful Misunderstanding were relatively limited. At the same time, she was occupied with filming Magic Kitchen, resulting in a rushed promotional schedule. The music video for the lead single was filmed only in Hong Kong, and promotion in Taiwan lasted just one week, as had been the case with her previous Mandarin-language releases. On November 1, Cheng attended the album launch event, followed by an autograph show in Taipei the next day. In the subsequent days, low-budget music videos were produced for other tracks, after which Cheng returned to Hong Kong to continue her film work, leaving little opportunity to further develop her career in Taiwan. Released in only one edition and hampered by insufficient promotion, the album sold 56,000 copies—significantly fewer than her earlier Mandarin releases. Nevertheless, it was the best-selling album by a Hong Kong artist in Taiwan at the time.

On 19 December, with the combined sales of Completely Yours... Sammi and Beautiful Misunderstanding, Cheng ranked fifth on the Hong Kong Record Merchants Association's year-end chart of the top five best-selling artists, with total sales of 240,000 copies.

In July 2004, she held 7 nights of "Sammi Vs Sammi" concerts in Hong Kong. She also broke the record as being the youngest female singer to hold more than 50 accumulated concert nights in the city.

==== 2005–2007: Break ====
In 2005, Cheng had only one feature film release and no music projects. She became a representative for Veeko and Titus, a fashion and watch brand in Hong Kong, respectively. She also began writing Saturday columns for Mingpao magazine. During Cheng's hiatus, Warner Music Group, her former record label, released the greatest hits album "Sammi Ultimate Collection" on 18 September 2006. The album contained no new material. It was released at a time when record sales in Hong Kong were generally weak, with a limited pressing, a relatively high retail price, and little promotional activity. Nevertheless, the album spent several weeks at the top of HMV Asia Sales Chart, was among the "Top Ten Best-Selling Cantonese Albums" at the IFPI Hong Kong Top Sales Music Award presented 2006, and ranked third on the year-end chart compiled by the Hong Kong Record Merchants Association. It became the best-selling album by a female artist in Hong Kong that year, with sales approaching platinum level. (In 2006, IFPI Hong Kong adjusted the platinum threshold to 40,000 units due to the downturn in the local market.) The release was regarded as the only compilation album that drew attention during the year. The break was taken to recoup her energy from the entertainment industry.

During a break lasting more than 1,000 days, she reflected upon her life, and became an evangelical Christian and was baptized in 2007.

==== 2007–2008:Resurgence with Show Mi Tour ====
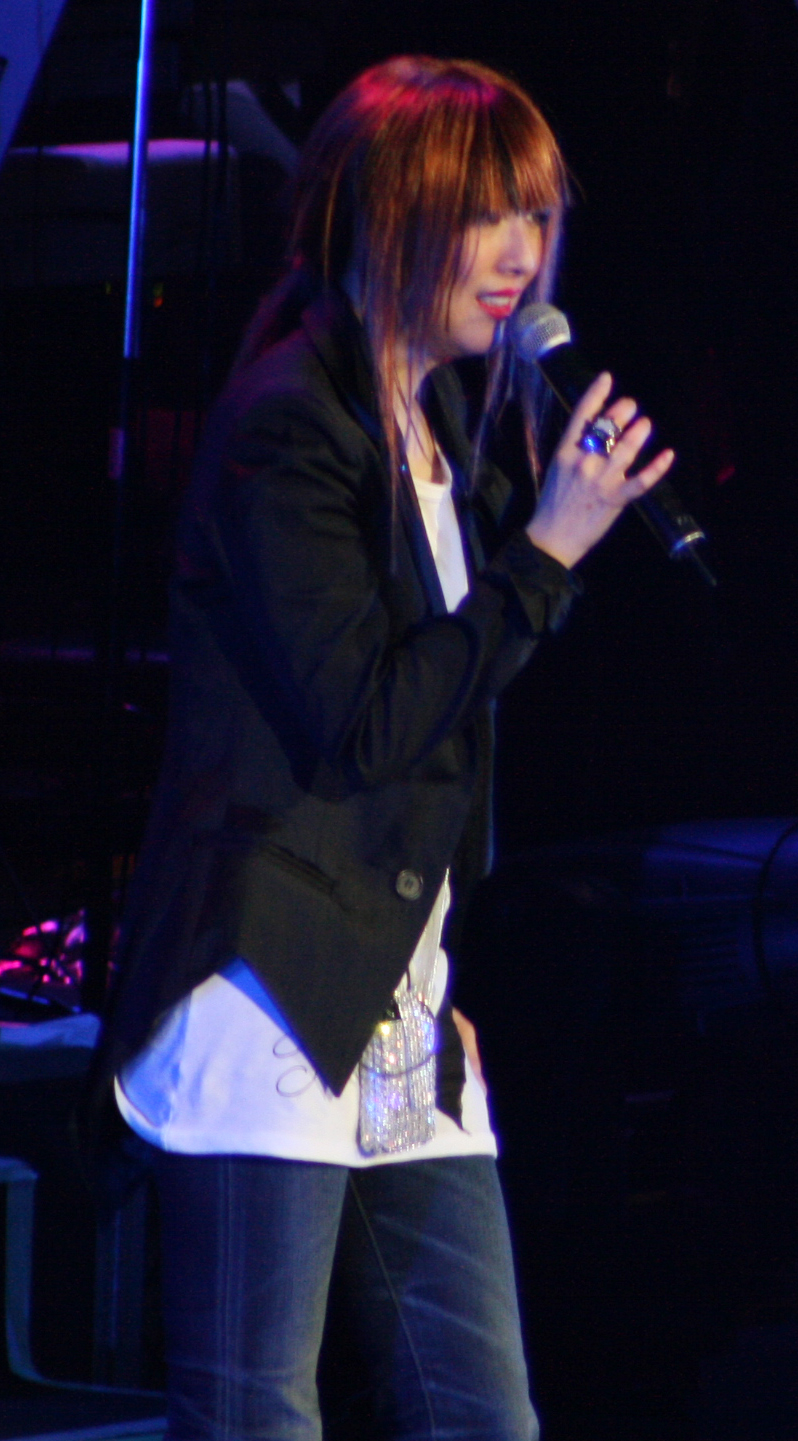
Cheng performing on her Show Mi World Tour in Toronto, June 2007

After taking a break for about 2 years, she re-invented herself again, and held her 6th concert in HK from 18 to 25 May 2007 titled "Show Mi" (Mi being the nickname of SamMI given by her fans). Due to the huge demand for tickets, the four performances was expanded to eight. She returned to entertain at the age of 34, and invited fellow star Andy Lau and Denise Ho to perform with her. At the end of the first show, audience members continued to shout 'encore' for 15 minutes until Sammi came back out and sang "Our Theme Song" (我們的主題曲). The concert was expanded to the Show Mi Tour.

On 3 August 2007, the CD edition of Sammi Show Mi 2007 Live was released. Shortly after its release, the album reached number one on the HMV Asian Sales Chart, with total sales of 50,000 copies. A limited edition DVD followed on 24 October, and a VCD edition was released on 16 November. On 29 November, a Blu‑ray edition was released, recognized as the first Blu‑ray concert disc recorded at the Hong Kong Coliseum.By early December, the combined sales of the VCD and DVD editions had reached double platinum status (in 2006–2007, IFPI Hong Kong defined double platinum as 80,000 units). Combined sales across all formats (CD, VCD, DVD, Blu‑ray) exceeded 200,000 units. The CD edition remained on the HMV Asia Sales Chart from August 2007 to mid‑January 2008, while the video formats (VCD, DVD, Blu‑ray) continued to appear on HMV's video sales chart throughout 2008. The release ultimately became the best‑selling live album in Hong Kong music history.

Subsequently, with the four formats of Sammi Show Mi 2007 Live (CD, VCD, DVD, and Blu‑ray), Cheng won the awards for Best Sales Cantonese Release and Best Sales Local Female Vocalist at the IFPI Hong Kong Top Sales Music Award presented 2007.

She then continues actively in Hong Kong entertainment industry after about two years of rest, marking a strong comeback with many more concerts held at Hong Kong, Macau, mainland China, Taiwan, Singapore, Malaysia, Canada, United States, Australia, etc. She also continued to work in films and had starred in various commercial advertisements.

==== 2014–2017: ====
From December 2014 to January 2015, she held 12 nights of 'Touch Mi' concerts in Hong Kong Coliseum. She also invited heavyweight stars to be the guests of her concerts, including Andy Lau, Jacky Cheung, Leon Lai, Ekin Cheng, Louis Koo, Nick Cheung and Eason Chan. Her 'Touch Mi' concert extends to World Tour in 2015 and 2016 with 4 shows at Genting (Malaysia), 3 shows at Macau (China), 3 shows at Singapore, 2 shows at Guangzhou (China), 1 show at Foshan (China), 1 show at Melbourne (Australia), 2 shows at Sydney (Australia), 1 show at Shenzhen (China), 1 show at London (United Kingdom). Her 'Touch Mi' World Tour concluded in Hong Kong with another 8 shows in September 2016, hence bringing her total number of shows for this world tour to 38. Some of her new guest stars in Touch Mi 2 Hong Kong shows are Dayo Wong, Dicky Cheung, Francis Ng and Alex To.

In 2017, she held a series of mini-concert tours entitled Naked. Sammi in Taiwan and China. Also, she held a private mini-concert in Macau, entitled Sammi Cheng VIP Music Private Enjoy Show. She held a single-show Sidetrack Birthday Gig concert at Macau on 19 August 2018 in conjunction of her 46th birthday as a treat to her fans. At the same year she collaborate for the first time with Taiwanese rock band 831, releasing her remake song "眉飛色舞Plus" (Eyebrow Dance Plus).

==== 2019–2022: ====
In 2019, she released the single "We Grew This Way" (我們都是這樣長大的) and won 12 music awards including "The best song of the year radio station and digital platforms. In conjunction with her 30th anniversary in the entertainment industry, her 10th concert world tour is organized, which began with 13 shows at Hong Kong's Coliseum in July 2019. This brought her total shows in Hong Kong's Coliseum exceeding 100-mark, at 102. In conjunction with her 49th birthday in 2021, she held a single-show 'Listen to Mi Birthday Gig' concert at Hong Kong on 18 August 2021. For her 50th birthday, she held a Christmas-themed 'You Are Beautiful To Mi Christmas Party' event at Hong Kong in December 2022.

==== 2023–2026: DREAM, SOUND OF MI and You & Mi Sammi Cheng World Tour ====
On 14 July 2023, Cheng released DREAM under Media Asia Music, her forty-second album overall and her third Cantonese extended play, to coincide with the scheduled start of the You & Mi Sammi Cheng World Tour. The tour was initially scheduled for 14 to 16, 18 to 19 and 21 to 23 July 2023. Demand was strong from the start. The Bank of East Asia credit card priority booking sold out in a single day, and once public sales opened on 18 May, five further nights on 25 to 26 and 28 to 30 July 2023 were added, bringing the total to 13. The shows did not go ahead as planned. Cheng had contracted COVID-19 in May and was left with lingering after-effects. She was physically weak and her voice was hoarse, and she felt it would be unfair to ticket holders to perform in that condition. She therefore postponed the entire run on 30 June, and explained the decision in a 12-minute video recorded in her hoarse voice, in which she apologised. A new timetable was announced in November, with the concerts postponed by a full year to begin on 12 July 2024. With Cheng taking a hiatus to recover, the EP received little promotion. Despite this, it debuted at number one on the Hong Kong Record Merchants Association (HKRMA) album sales chart, maintained that position for two weeks, the most weeks at number one for a female artist's release that year. It was also the best-selling Cantonese release in Hong Kong that year.

On 12 July 2024, Cheng released SOUND OF MI under Media Asia Music, her forty-third album overall and her fourth Cantonese extended play. It was released to coincide with her eleventh solo concert tour, the You & Mi Sammi Cheng World Tour, held at the Hong Kong Coliseum. It debuted at number one on the Hong Kong Record Merchants Association (HKRMA) album sales chart, maintained that position for three weeks, making it the best-selling Cantonese release that year.

"Face Your Demons (心魔)" served as the EP's lead single. It was first heard on 903 on 21 May 2024, its music video followed on 23 May 2024, and it became available on streaming services on 24 May 2024. It reached number one on four major charts in Hong Kong and mainland China, including the Ultimate Song Chart (903), LINE TODAY Hong Kong Song Chart, Fresh Music Pop Songs Chart and the Chinese Music Chart, while also peaking at number two on the JSG Billboard and number twelve on the 997 Metro Hit Chart. It also ranked number forty-eight on the KKBox Top 100 Cantonese Yearly Singles Chart.

"A Box of Chocolates" (盲盒) was chosen as the EP's second single, and went to radio on 27 June 2024, arrived on streaming services on 5 July 2024, and its music video debuted on YouTube on 7 July 2024. Framed by the idea that "Life is like a box of chocolates", the song treats each step in life as opening a blind box — no one knows what will come out, and it may turn out to be exactly what was hoped for. It urges listeners not to give up on their dreams or on life too early.It topped four major charts in Hong Kong ,Canada and mainland China, including the 997 Metro Hit Chart, Fairchild Radio Canadian Chinese Pop Music Chart, Fresh Music Pop Songs Chart and the Guangzhou Radio MY FM 880 Music King Billboard Top 10 ,while also reaching number sixteen on the Ultimate Song Chart (903). It finished at number twenty on the KKBox Top 100 Cantonese Yearly Singles Chart.

"Beloved Ones" (從前的我們), released as the EP's third single, was made available on streaming services on 23 July 2024, with its music video premiering on YouTube the same day. In Hong Kong it came out as a streaming-only single and was not sent to radio. The song is about a couple who were once in love and believed they could walk hand in hand to the end, but, like all couples, hit a low point in their relationship.It topped the LINE TODAY Hong Kong Song Chart, reached number two on the Chinese Music Chart in mainland China, and reached number five on the Fresh Music Pop Songs Chart in mainland China. It also ranked number fifty-nine on the KKBox Top 100 Cantonese Yearly Singles Chart.

The EP's fourth single, "Aerial View of My Life" (天下看娃娃), was released on streaming services on 26 October 2024, with its music video premiering on YouTube the same day. It peaked at number eight on the Fairchild Radio Canadian Chinese Pop Music Chart and ranked sixtieth on the KKBox Top 100 Cantonese Yearly Singles Chart.

The rescheduled tour opened on 12 July 2024. On the opening night, Cheng thanked fans for standing by her, for keeping their tickets and for waiting twelve months. She said she had approached the year-long wait like preparing for a wedding, and was determined not to let the audience down, paying attention to even the smallest detail. Two songs from SOUND OF MI were in the first night's setlist: "Face Your Demons" (心魔) and "A Box of Chocolates" (盲盒).The rescheduled run was a success. All 13 dates in July 2024 filled the venue, and reviews were positive. Cheng later won a Top Ten Golden BROWN Award at the LINE TODAY Golden BROWN Awards 2024. Looking back, she described the tour as her most fulfilling project of 2024, noting that she had devoted five months to getting it ready, turning away other offers in order to stay focused. She added that she wanted to carry on with both singing and acting in 2025.

Following the success of “SOUND OF MI” and the “You & Mi” tour, Cheng won the fan-voted My Favourite Female Artist award at the Ultimate Song Chart Awards Presentation 2024 on 1 January 2025.

The tour then continued to Macau in May 2025 with You & Mi Sammi Cheng Live in Macau 2025, held at The Venetian Arena. It was initially announced as six shows from 9 to 11 and 16 to 18 May 2025. After all six shows sold out, a seventh show on 24 May was added, followed by an eighth show on 25 May in response to public demand. For the Macau run, Cheng performed on a four-sided stage with new set designs and costumes, and sported a new long blonde hairstyle, all distinct from the Hong Kong leg. In total, The Macau leg was a success, with all eight shows playing to full-capacity crowds.

On 9 May 2025, Cheng released You & Mi Sammi Cheng World Tour, her sixteenth live album, under Media Asia Music. Despite little promotion, It topped the Hong Kong Record Merchants Association (HKRMA) album sales chart for four consecutive weeks, and later returned to No. 1 for a few more weeks. reached number one on Taiwan iTunes Hot Albums Chart, and peaked at number two on the Taiwan Chia Chia Records Chinese Live Album sales chart. On YesAsia's 2025 Bestsellers - Chinese Music year-end chart, You & Mi Sammi Cheng World Tour ranked No. 3 on the Top 10 Chinese-language live albums chart, making it the best-selling album by a female artist on the platform that year, and, on the strength of the album, Cheng ranked No. 3 on the Top 10 best-selling artists chart. Additionally,music streaming service JOOX named the album one of its Top 10 Cantopop Albums of 2025, while Cheng was also named its Most Popular Female Artist and one of its Top 10 Cantopop Artists.

Following the success of the Macau leg, the tour moved on to Kuala Lumpur in April 2026 with the Kuala Lumpur leg of You & Mi Sammi Cheng World Tour, held at the Axiata Arena on 17 and 18 April 2026. Tickets went on general sale on 15 January 2026 via Ticket2u, and sold out on the same day. The two shows marked her first concerts in Malaysia in ten years, since her Touch Mi show at Genting's Arena of Stars. Both shows played to full-capacity crowds, with Cheng performing two encores and being moved to tears. The tour was scheduled to conclude with the Hong Kong finale, AXA Presents: You & Mi Sammi Cheng Live at HK Kai Tak Stadium 2026 - Asia Tour Finale, at Kai Tak Stadium. The initial two shows on 10 and 11 July 2026 sold out during both the BEA credit card priority booking on 20 April and the general sale on 28 April, prompting the addition of a third and final show on 12 July 2026, with tickets for the added show going on sale on 11 May 2026. The three shows were later postponed due to a malfunction of a key stage component discovered during set-up. The organiser apologised and announced that a 1.5-hour "Thank You Concert" would be held instead on the original dates, times and venue, with ticket holders able to keep their tickets and later choose a refund or attend the rescheduled concert. The three "Thank You Concerts" were held on 10, 11 and 12 July 2026, with all three shows performed successfully to full-capacity crowds, and received positive reviews. According to Billboard Boxscore for July 2026, the three Kai Tak shows ranked No. 12 on the Top Boxscores chart, with a reported gross of US$21.3 million, and Cheng ranked No. 20 on the Top Tours chart with the same gross. The concert also ranked first among live events in Hong Kong's most-searched lists for July to August 2026. The shows were subsequently rescheduled to 28 to 30 May 2027.

Beware of women (小心女人)
A 1990s cantopop instrument arrangement by Sammi Cheng.

=== Acting ===
Cheng's acting career began with the TVB series A Life of His Own (浪族闊少爺) in 1991. A year later she began her film career with the movie Best of the Best (飛虎精英之人間有情) in 1992 with fellow Cantopop star Jacky Cheung. She would follow with another comedy film Feel 100% (百分百感覺) with Ekin Cheng and Gigi Leung.

In the late 1990s during the slump of the Hong Kong film industry, Cheng starred in the film Needing You... by director Johnnie To, co-starring Andy Lau and the movie Summer Holiday in 2000. The films were hits at the box office hit in all South East Asia regions, and Hong Kong has cumulated nearly HK$60 million at the box office. The Needing You... VCD received a sold out record of more than 200,000 copies. For this film, she was also nominated for the Best Actress as well as the Best Original Film Song at the 20th Hong Kong Film Awards. Following the success of those movies, she starred in Wu Yen, Love on a Diet, Marry a Rich Man, My Left Eye Sees Ghosts and many more. At the 62nd Venice International Film Festival, Cheng was one of the frontrunners for the Volpi Cup for Best Actress for the film Everlasting Regret. Other contenders for the award included Monica Bellucci, Gwyneth Paltrow, Lee Young-ae and Isabelle Huppert.

On 18 April 2002, Warner Music Hong Kong released a soundtrack compilation album titled Sammi Movie Theme Songs Collection (鄭秀文電影金曲精選) to celebrate the success of "Beautiful Life" [From "Love on a Diet"] (終生美麗), which won Best Original Film Song at the 21st Hong Kong Film Awards., and Cheng won Best Actress at the Hong Kong Film Critics Society Award for her acclaimed performance in Wu Yen (鍾無艷). Against this backdrop of simultaneous achievements in film and music, Warner Music Hong Kong issued Sammi Movie Theme Songs Collection to highlight her crossover appeal as both a Cantopop diva and a film star. The album achieved strong sales in Hong Kong, Singapore, and Malaysia.

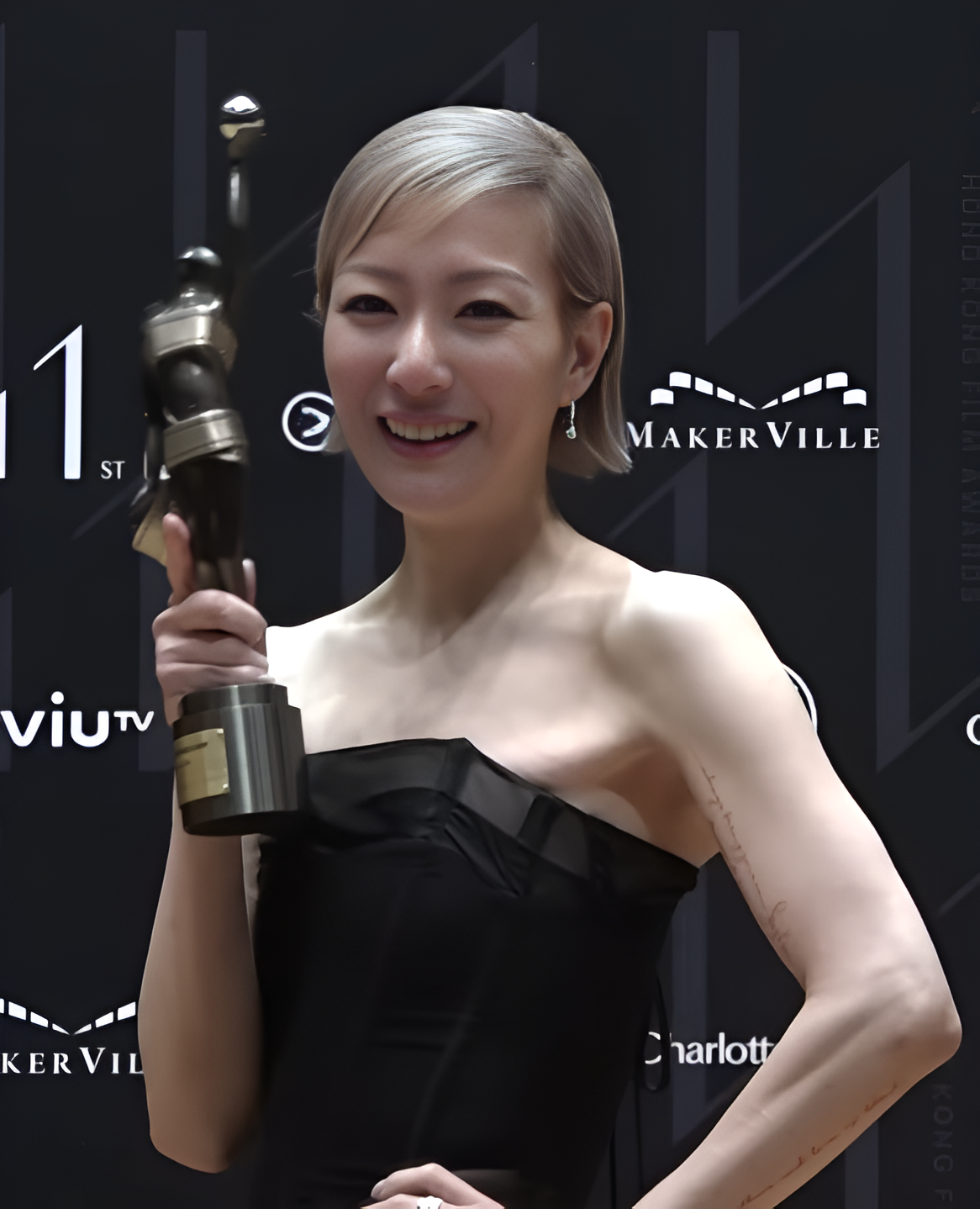
Cheng won The Hong Kong Film Award for Best Actress in 2023 for her role in Lost Love.

Cheng has been nominated for the Hong Kong Film Award for Best Actress 10 times, in 2001 for her performance in Needing You..., triple nominations in 2002 for Fighting for Love, Wu yen and Love on a Diet, in 2006 for Everlasting Regret, in 2013 for Romancing in Thin Air, in 2014 for Blind Detective, double nominations in 2020 for Fagara and Fatal Visit, and in 2023 for Lost Love, becoming one of the most nominated leading actresses in the history of the Hong Kong Film Awards. She has also earned 3 nominations for Best Leading Actress at Taiwan's Golden Horse Awards, the most prestigious awards for Chinese-language films, for Needing You..., My Left Eye Sees Ghosts and Blind Detective. She also won the Golden Horse Award for Best Original Film Song for "DoReMi" (Romancing in Thin Air) in 2012. She was named Best Actress by the Hong Kong Film Critics Society in 2002 for her titular role in Wu yen.

For her contribution to the Hong Kong film industry and having starred in over 30 films, Cheng received the Excellence in Asian Cinema Award at the 11th Asian Film Awards in 2017. For her critically acclaimed performance in Lost Love, she won four Best Actress honors in 2023 from the Hong Kong Film Critics Society, the Hong Kong Film Directors' Guild, the Hong Kong Online Critics' Choice Awards and the 41st Hong Kong Film Awards.

=== Advertisements ===
Cheng changes her look and image for every album, which enables her to gain extensive attention and appreciation from the music professional and the public. Sammi is a trendsetter of hair-coloring and has been chosen to be one of the Top Ten fashionable celebrities in Hong Kong. She has been signed and endorsed by many companies. These endorsements include SK-II skin care and Mona Lisa bridal service. Her first album with Warner Music Group, "Can't Let You Go " (捨不得你) released 3 hit singles, "Hey! Man!" (男仕今天你很好), "Can't Let You Go" (捨不得你) and "The Elegy of Love" (愛的輓歌). She was selected as the prominent celebrity for the endorsement of Panasonic using "Can't Let You Go " (捨不得你) as the theme song.

In the many years of her active presence in entertainment industry, she had been involved in multiple advertisements for various brands ranging from sports shoes, watches, clothing, massager, skin-care products, magazine covers, etc.

== Artistry ==
=== Influences ===
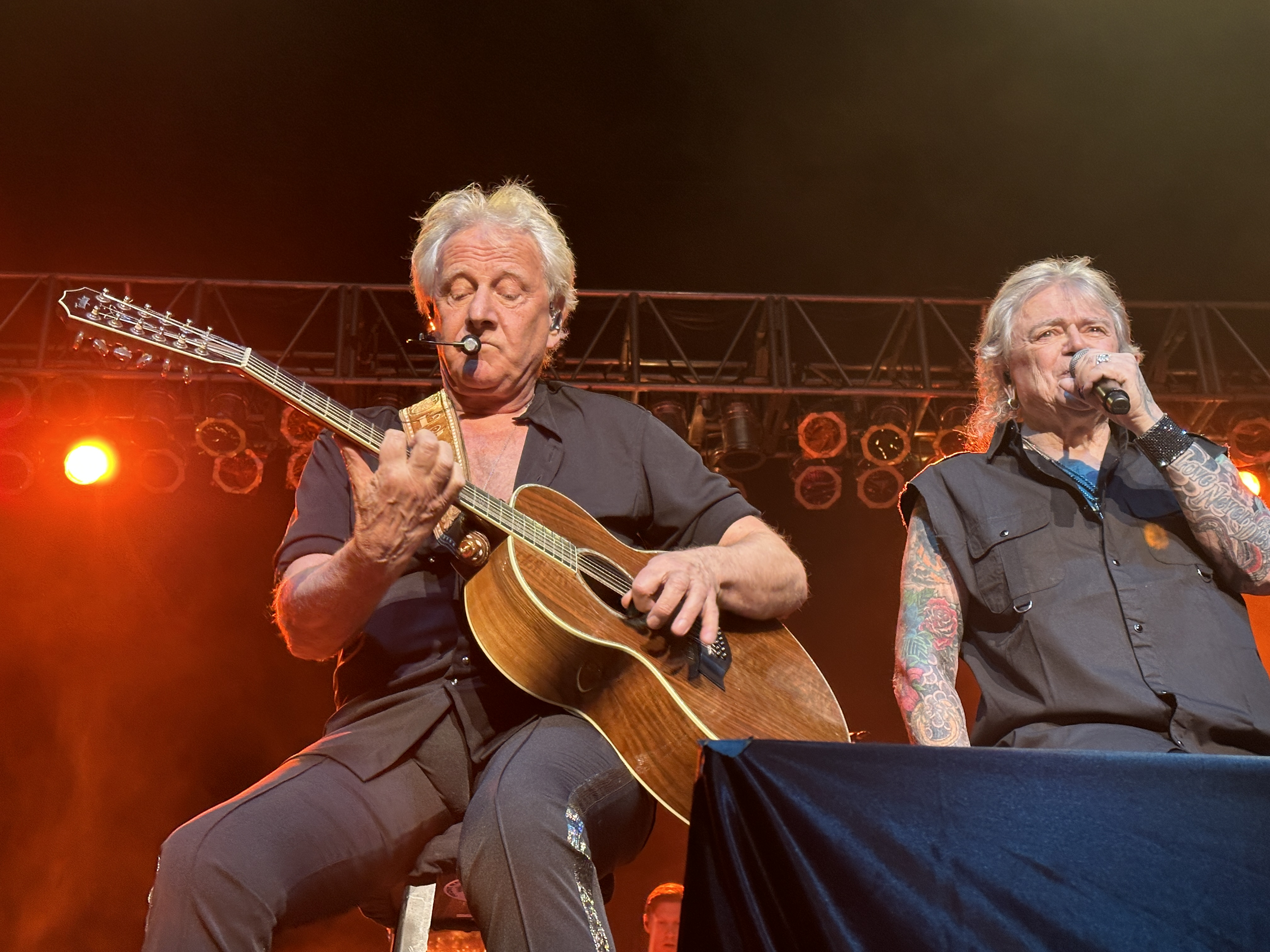
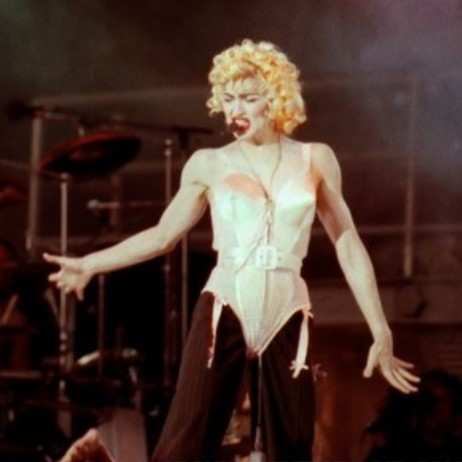
Cheng's major influences include Air Supply (left) and Madonna (right).

In her early interviews, Cheng expressed a fondness for the soft rock ballads of Air Supply, noting that she preferred melodic pop over heavier rock styles, which she considered too noisy. This preference shaped her inclination towards ballads and accessible pop songs in the early stages of her career.

Cheng has acknowledged that her stage performances were influenced by Madonna, particularly in terms of bold fashion choices and choreography. At her first solo concert at the Hong Kong Coliseum in 1996, Cheng wore a cone‑shaped bra top inspired by Madonna's 1990 stage costume, reflecting her willingness to experiment with provocative and avant‑garde imagery.

=== Musical style ===
Cheng's musical style has been described by critics as commercial, ranging from ballads to dance tracks, while also incorporating some avant‑garde elements. She even incorporated hip-hop, rap, techno, rhythm 'n' blues, bossa nova and jazz into her songs, When Cantopop started losing its lustre in the late 1990s. Although primarily known for commercial stuff, Cheng also experimented with heavier rock styles. In 2019, she released a single titled "Power of Love", which incorporated elements of electronic metal rock. However, its reception was less prominent compared to her contemporaneous hit "We Grew This Way" (我們都是這樣長大的), reflecting audiences' stronger preference for mainstream pop. During the early 1990s, Cheng gained recognition as a balladeer with her first chart-topping song "The Season That Never Came (不來的季節)", and also established herself in dance-pop with the success of "Ding-Dong (叮噹)". In late 1995, Cheng was dubbed by media as the 'Karaoke Queen' after her song "Can't Let You Go (捨不得你)" topped Hong Kong's karaoke chart for 16 consecutive weeks. In late 2000, she was officially dubbed by Taiwanese media as the 'Karaoke Queen' for her karaoke-friendly Mandarin hits such as "Out Bound (出界)", "Never Enough (永遠都不夠)", and "If I were you (如果我是你)". Consequently, in November 2001, Warner Music Taiwan released a video album Sammi Karaoke Chart-Topping Hits compiling all of Cheng's Mandarin songs that had reached number one on the karaoke chart between 1996 and 2000." After staging 16 consecutive concerts at the Hong Kong Coliseum under the title Sammi Star Show 97, Cheng was in late 1997 dubbed by Singaporean media as the 'Avant‑Garde Dance‑song Queen' following her adoption of bold stage costumes, experimental choreography, and a repertoire that emphasized dance‑pop innovation.

=== Songwriting ===
Although Cheng is not generally regarded as a singer-songwriter, she has contributed her own works. Her most successful composition is Through The Hurdles (衝過去), which reached number one on three music charts in Hong Kong.

In November 1994, the single Love Hurt So Much (苦戀) marked Cheng's first effort as a lyricist, expressing a story of painful love. As she chose not to renew her contract with Capital Artists at the time, the song received limited promotion and achieved only moderate chart performance. Nevertheless, it gained circulation among listeners because it was used as the theme song for the Hong Kong film Most Wanted (旺角的天空). The song's alignment with the film's narrative enhanced its resonance with audiences.

In July 1998, Sammi Cheng released a Cantonese song titled Feels Like 1998, for which she wrote the lyrics herself. The track was included on her album Feel So Good and reflected Cheng's impressions of that year, incorporating political references. The song was subsequently banned in mainland China, where the local edition of the album omitted the track and was retitled Wishing Everyone Well. An older song was added in its place, a substitution noted as stylistically inconsistent with the original album concept.

=== Voice and timbre ===
In late 1997, Singaporean media described Cheng as having "rich sultriness in an alto voice packed with emotion and power."

=== Public Image and Style ===
Sammi Cheng is widely regarded as a fashion icon and is known for her highly versatile image. She was the first female singer in Hong Kong to dye her hair completely blonde, as well as the first to adopt a fully red hairstyle. Cheng is recognized for her bold and distinctive album covers and concert looks, notably popularizing the "Nike eyebrow" style at her first concert, titled "Sammi's X-Dimension Concert," in 1996. Her fashion and styling have earned her recognition as one of the Top Ten Best-Dressed Celebrities in Hong Kong, and she is frequently referred to by the media as the "Queen of Versatility."

==== Trend ====
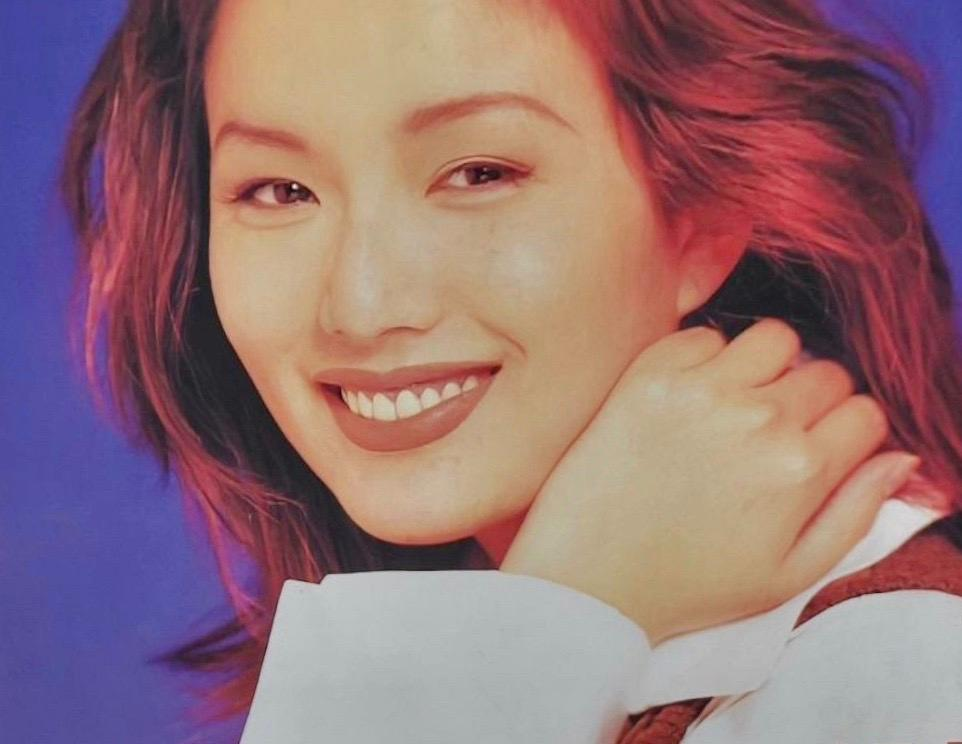
Cheng with red‑dyed hair in 1993

In 1993, Sammi Cheng requested a change of image from her label, Capital Artists. She subsequently began appearing with different hair colours, initially dyeing her hair golden brown, which received a positive response, and later red. This helped to popularize hair dyeing in Hong Kong at a time when society was relatively conservative and coloured hair was often associated with delinquency. Cheng's adoption of this style broke with prevailing stereotypes and was followed by other artists, including Faye Wong, who embraced hair colouring as part of their image.

== Controversies ==
Since rising to diva status in 1996, Cheng occasionally faced hostility from rival fans and their associated teams, particularly those of Faye Wong, who felt that Cheng had overshadowed their idol. In January 1997, media outlets supportive of Wong published reports alleging that Warner Music Hong Kong executive Frankie Lee (李進) had diverted promotional funds intended for Madonna's album Evita to support Cheng's release. The claim was unfounded, as Cheng was holding her concert series in Hong Kong at the time, meaning the promotional periods were different. In fact, her upcoming album had already been promoted a month before Madonna's release, and songs from the album were further promoted during her concerts. For these reasons, the report was regarded as fabricated, although variations of it have continued to circulate on mainland Chinese websites. In May 1997, following further disputes in which Wong's supporters and their teams were accused of attacking rival singers, Singaporean media published an article titled 'Stop giving imitator Faye Wong credit she does not deserve,' defending artists who had been targeted.

In January 2002, the mainland Chinese newspaper Beijing Morning Post published a provocative article titled 'Advertising and albums in full-scale attack: Cheng replaces Faye Wong.' The report prompted strong hostility from Wong's fans and her team, who submitted complaint letters to the newspaper and directed insults at Cheng. As singers are passive subjects of media coverage, they are often unaware of and unable to control such reports. Because the article suggested that Wong was past her prime, in sharp contrast to Cheng's surging popularity at the time, Cheng became the target of hostility. Wong's supporters used inaccurate information to attack and insult her. The Beijing Morning Post, as a mainland outlet, was not fully familiar with the Hong Kong music industry, and its report contained factual errors. In particular, it claimed that Cheng's sales of two Cantonese albums, one compilation, and one Mandarin album exceeded 300,000 copies. However, the Hong Kong Record Merchants Association did not include compilation albums without promotional singles in its annual sales totals. Cheng in fact won the 'Best-Selling Artist of the Year' award, presented by the Hong Kong Record Merchants Association through 2001 RTHK Top 10 Gold Songs Awards, with combined sales of 400,000 copies from two Cantonese albums and one Mandarin album: Love Is (140,000), Shocking Pink (160,000), and Complete (100,000). At the time, there was no award for best-selling Mandarin album, making the claim in Wong's fans' complaint letter—that Wong's Mandarin release was the year's top seller—incorrect. Several reports even noted that Wong's Mandarin album had sold poorly, with sales of only around 40,000 copies.

== Community work ==
In 2003 Cheng performed at the 1:99 Concert to raise funds for SARS affected families. She had participated in the 2008 Chinese winter storm support effort where many artists including Andy Lau, Alan Tam, Kelly Chen, etc. recorded a song called "Warmth in the Snow" in support of those effected by the storm. She was also a participant of the Artistes 512 Fund Raising Campaign. In April 2008, she participated in the activities of World Vision. She traveled to Laos with fellow singer Gigi Leung, also a World Vision volunteer, to experience for themselves the struggles of the local people and children. They also visited the local children there to find out more on their situation where food and supplies are lacking. When Sammi returned to Hong Kong, she and Leung were invited to a radio program 903 to talk about the experience; she responded by announcing she had "adopted" 24 children.

== Filmography ==
=== Film ===
Year	Title	Role
2026	Night King	Dame V
2022	Lost Love	Tin Mei
2021	Hero	Liang Jingshi
2021	The Day We Lit Up The Sky	Cameo appearance
2019	Fagara	Xia Ru Shu
2019	First Night Nerves	Yuen Sau Ling
2019	Midnight Drive	Mrs.Yung
2019	Fatal Visit	Ling
2019	I Love You, You're Perfect, Now Change!	Cameo appearance
2018	Agent Mr Chan	Sammi Cheng
2017	Love Contractually	Katrina
2016	Mission Milano	Cameo appearance
2015	Triumph in the Skies	T.M.
2014	Temporary Family	Charlotte
2013	Blind Detective	Ho Ka-tung
2013	Boundless	
2012	Romancing in Thin Air	Sau
2008	Lady Cop & Papa Crook	Molline Szeto
2005	Everlasting Regret	Wang Qi-yao
2004	Enter the Phoenix	Cameo appearance
2004	Magic Kitchen	Yau
2004	Yesterday Once More	Mrs. To
2003	Love for All Seasons	May
2003	Good Times, Bed Times	Carrie
2003	Infernal Affairs III	Mary
2003	1:99	
2002	Marry a Rich Man	Ah Mi
2002	My Left Eye Sees Ghosts	May
2002	Infernal Affairs	Mary
2001	Wu Yen	Wu Yen
2001	Fighting for Love	Deborah
2001	Love on a Diet	Mini Mo
2000	Needing You...	Kinki
2000	Summer Holiday	Summer Koo
1998	The Lucky Guy	Candy
1997	Killing Me Tenderly	Cindy
1996	Feel 100%	Cherrie
1996	Feel 100% ... Once More	Yen
1992	Best of the Best	Heidi

=== Television series ===
Year	Title	Role
1991	Life of His Own 浪族闊少爺	施敏
1992	File of Justice 壹號皇庭	Josephine Fong Ka Kei (方家琪)
1993	The Vampire Returns 大頭綠衣鬥疆屍	飄雪/飄紅/Kitty
1994	Journey of Love 親恩情未了	張家慧
1995	Detective Investigation Files II 刑事偵緝檔案 II	Ivy
1999	Man's Best Friend 寵物情緣	Susan
2002	The Monkey King: Quest for the Sutra 齊天大聖孫悟空	觀音大士

== Discography ==
Cantonese studio albums

- Sammi (1990)
- Holiday (1991)
- Never Too Late (1992)
- Happy Maze (1993)
- Ten Commandments (1994)
- Lost Memory (1994)
- After (1995)
- Can't Let You Go (1995)
- Never Want To Give You Up (1996)
- Passion (1996)
- Our Theme Song (1997)
- Living Language (1997)
- Feel So Good (1998)
- Listen to Sammi (1999)
- Love You Very Much (1999)
- Ladies First (2000)
- Love Is ... (2000)
- Shocking Pink (2001)
- Tender (2001)
- Becoming Sammi (2002)
- Wonder Woman (2002)
- La La La (2004)
- Sammi vs. Sammi (2004)
- Faith (2009)
- Love is Love (2013)
- Fabulous (2016)
- Believe in Mi (2018)
- Listen To Mi (2021)
- Dream（2023）
- SOUND OF MI（2024）

Mandarin studio albums

- Worth It (1996)
- Waiting for You (1997)
- I Deserved (1999)
- To Love (2000)
- Complete (2001)
- Letting Go (2002)
- Beautiful Misunderstanding (2003)
- Faith (2010)
- Nude (2017)

== Concerts ==
- X Live '96 (1996)
- Star Show (1997–1998)
- i Concert '99 (1999–2000)
- Shocking Colors Live (2001–2002)
- Sammi vs. Sammi (2004)
- Show Mi World Tour (2007–2008)
- Love Mi World Tour (2009–2011)
- Touch Mi World Tour (2014–2016)
- FOLLOWMi World Tour (2019)
- You & Mi World Tour (2024–2027)

== Awards and nominations ==
Award	Year	Category	Nominated work	Result	Ref.
Asian Film Awards	2017	Excellence in Asian Cinema Award	Sammi Cheng	Won	
Golden Bauhinia Awards	2001	Best Actress	Needing You...	Nominated	
Golden Bauhinia Awards	2002	Best Actress	Love on a Diet	Nominated	
Golden Horse Awards	2000	Best Leading Actress	Needing You...	Nominated	
Golden Horse Awards	2002	Best Leading Actress	My Left Eye Sees Ghosts	Nominated	
Golden Horse Awards	2002	Best Original Film Song	"Fall in Love With Somebody" (My Left Eye Sees Ghosts)	Nominated	
Golden Horse Awards	2012	Best Original Film Song	"DoReMi" (Romancing in Thin Air)	Won	
Golden Horse Awards	2013	Best Leading Actress	Blind Detective	Nominated	
Hong Kong Film Awards	1993	Best New Performer	Best of the Best	Nominated	
Hong Kong Film Awards	1997	Best Original Film Song	"Mut Kai" (Feel 100%)	Nominated	
Hong Kong Film Awards	2001	Best Actress	Needing You...	Nominated	
Hong Kong Film Awards	2001	Best Original Film Song	"In the Line of Love" (Needing You...)	Nominated	
Hong Kong Film Awards	2002	Best Actress	Wu yen	Nominated	
Hong Kong Film Awards	2002	Best Actress	Fighting for Love	Nominated	
Hong Kong Film Awards	2002	Best Actress	Love on a Diet	Nominated	
Hong Kong Film Awards	2002	Best Original Film Song	"Jung Sun May Lai" (Love on a Diet)	Won	
Hong Kong Film Awards	2005	Best Original Film Song	"Tiu Ching" (Magic Kitchen)	Nominated	
Hong Kong Film Awards	2005	Best Original Film Song	"Yu Gor Nei Yau Si" (Yesterday Once More)	Nominated	
Hong Kong Film Awards	2006	Best Actress	Everlasting Regret	Nominated	
Hong Kong Film Awards	2013	Best Actress	Romancing in Thin Air	Nominated	
Hong Kong Film Awards	2013	Best Original Film Song	"DoReMi" (Romancing in Thin Air)	Nominated	
Hong Kong Film Awards	2014	Best Actress	Blind Detective	Nominated	
Hong Kong Film Awards	2014	Best Original Film Song	"Love Is Blind" (Blind Detective)	Nominated	
Hong Kong Film Awards	2020	Best Actress	Fagara	Nominated	
Hong Kong Film Awards	2020	Best Actress	Fatal Visit	Nominated	
Hong Kong Film Awards	2020	Best Original Film Song	"Say It Properly" (Fagara)	Nominated	
Hong Kong Film Awards	2023	Best Actress	Lost Love	Won	
Hong Kong Film Awards	2023	Best Original Film Song	"Live a Life" (Lost Love)	Won	
Hong Kong Film Critics Society Award	2002	Best Actress	Wu yen	Won	
Hong Kong Film Critics Society Award	2010	Best Actress	Lady Cop & Papa Crook	Nominated	
Hong Kong Film Critics Society Award	2014	Best Actress	Blind Detective	Nominated	
Hong Kong Film Critics Society Award	2020	Best Actress	Fatal Visit	Nominated	
Hong Kong Film Critics Society Award	2023	Best Actress	Lost Love	Won	
Hong Kong Film Directors' Guild Awards	2013	Best Actress	Blind Detective	Nominated	
Hong Kong Film Directors' Guild Awards	2023	Best Actress	Lost Love	Won	
Macau International Movie Festival	2020	Golden Lotus Award for Best Actress	Fatal Visit	Nominated	
MTV Asia Awards	2002	Favorite Artist Hong Kong	Sammi Cheng	Won	
MTV Asia Awards	2003	Favorite Artist Hong Kong	Sammi Cheng	Won	
MTV Asia Awards	2004	Favorite Artist Hong Kong	Sammi Cheng	Won	
