= I Deserved =

Studio album by Sammi Cheng
- Released: 10 May 1999
- Recorded: March 1999
- Studios: Form Recording Studio,Avon Recording Studios,Platinum Studio,Mega Force Studio
- Genres: Pop; Mandopop; EDM; dance-pop; pop rock; ballad
- Length: 50:29
- Language: Mandarin
- Label: Warner Music Taiwan
- Producers: Yuan Wei-jen, Peter Lee Shih Shiong, Paula Ma Yu Fen, George Leong, Tom Pan, Terence Teo, Martin Tang ,Francis Lee.

Sammi Cheng chronology
Listen To Sammi (1999)	I Deserved (1999)	Love You Very Much (1999)

Singles from I Deserved
- 1. "Absence"; 2. "Over The Border"; 3. "I Deserved"; 4. "Never Enough"; 5. "Black Box"; 6. "Prepared"; 7. "Bad Habit"

I Deserved (Mandarin: 我應該得到) is the seventeenth studio album and third Mandarin-language studio album by Hong Kong singer Sammi Cheng.It was released on 10 May 1999 by Warner Music Taiwan. The album marked Cheng’s return to the Mandarin pop market after a two-year hiatus since her previous release. Its music incorporates Typical Mandopop styles with elements of EDM ,dance-pop and rock in the form of upbeat songs and piano-driven sentimental ballads.In Taiwan, the album was a commercial success, ranking eighth among the ten best‑selling albums of 1999, with sales exceeding 550,000 copies, making Cheng the best‑selling Hong Kong female artist in Taiwan that year. The album was commercially successful in Singapore and ranked among the ten best‑selling albums of 1999, with sales exceeding 70,000 copies,making Cheng the best‑selling Hong Kong-born female artist in Singapore that year.In Hong Kong, the album was certified Gold by IFPI and the Hong Kong Record Merchants Association, with sales of 40,000 copies, and cumulative sales had reached 100,000 by June 2001. Together with her Cantonese releases Listen to Sammi and Love You Very Much, the album enabled Cheng to receive the award for Best Sales Local Female Vocalist of 1999 from IFPI (Hong Kong Group), as well as the runner‑up position for Best-Selling Music Artist of 1999 presented by the Hong Kong Record Merchants Association. Across Asia, total sales reached 1.9 million copies.

== Background and development ==
Following the departure of Sammi Cheng’s manager, Frankie Lee Chun, from Warner Music, the planned release of her Mandarin‑language album in June 1998 was cancelled. At the same time, Cheng’s contract with Warner Music was approaching expiration, and renewal negotiations faced difficulties.. As a result, Cheng was unable to focus on developing her career in Taiwan, and it was not until November 1998 that she finalized a contract extension with Warner Music. On 5 January 1999, Warner Music held a press conference titled “Crossing into the 2000s: A New Century Agreement (飛越2000世紀之約)” to officially announce Cheng’s contract renewal and the forthcoming release of a Mandarin-language album. After the press conference, Cheng stated in an interview that her workload in 1998 had been relatively light, and that her income was sustained largely by the strong sales performance of her records that year.

== Composition ==
The album incorporates a range of contemporary Mantopop styles, blending sentimental ballads, EDM,Rock,dance-pop with up-tempo tracks. Cheng worked with several producers and songwriters, including Yuan Wei-jen, Peter Lee Shih Shiong, Paula Ma Yu Fen, George Leong, Tom Pan, Terence Teo, Martin Tang and Francis Lee.

== Concept and imagery ==
Cheng stated that the inspiration for the album’s title stemmed from the fact that she had not released a Mandarin-language album for two years. She explained that she had worked diligently on the record, hoping to “deserve” continued support from the public, and therefore named her third Mandarin-language studio album I Deserved.

In May 1996, Cheng appeared with a bronzed complexion that sparked a tanning and fitness trend. This album continued that signature style, complementing the summer sun and vitality while aligning with its upbeat rock and electronic dance elements. To achieve the desired bronzed look, she revealed that she regularly used sun lamps, projecting an image of healthy sensuality.

For the promotion of I Deserved , Cheng adopted a wide range of visual styles that highlighted her versatility in fashion and performance. According to contemporary reports described her as appearing with honey‑tanned skin and braided hair, alongside contrasting looks such as an “ice maiden,” “sexy pussy cat,” “bohemian,” and “cowgirl,” underscoring her adaptability to different images. Fashion consultant Yu Jia Ming praised her confidence and physique, noting that her ability to embody multiple styles contributed to the album’s distinctive presentation.

== Promotion ==
Cheng primarily promoted the album through television interviews and coverage in newspapers and magazines, with promotional activities concentrated in Taiwan.

Before the album was released, the title track "I Deserved" was used as the theme song for the CTV drama " Sun Plants" , Which broadened its audience in Taiwan.

=== Pre-Sale Campaign ===
On 8 May 1999 at 2:00 pm, Warner Music Taiwan organized the “I Deserved” Cheng Pre‑release Sales Event （"我應該得到"鄭秀文首賣會 ）at Warner Village Cinemas in Taipei, two days before the album’s official release, where fans were able to purchase autographed copies. Although it had been two years since her last Mandarin‑language release, the response was highly enthusiastic, with crowds so large that near‑chaos ensued. At one point, a fan accidentally severed a cable, causing an inflatable ring‑shaped pillar on stage to deflate and collapse.

=== Mini Concert ===
On 13 May 1999 at 8:00 pm, Warner Music Taiwan organized the “I Deserved” Cheng New Songs Mini Concert （"我應該得到"鄭秀文新歌演唱會）at Nangang 101 in Taipei, where Cheng performed several songs, including the tracks from this album and her earlier hits. The event was broadcast live that evening by Singapore’s YES 933 and Channel 8 aired a delayed telecast on 15 May 1999 at 11:00 p.m.

=== Online Fan Meeting ===
On 15 May 1999, as Cheng did not travel to Singapore for album promotion, Warner Music Singapore organized an event at Suntec City at 2:00 p.m. titled “I Deserved Sammi Global Online Fan Meeting (我應該得到鄭秀文全球網路見 •鄭’會)”. In addition to presenting footage of Cheng’s promotional activities in Taiwan, two fans were selected to participate in a live online fan meeting with her.

=== Autograph show ===
On 5 June 1999, as sales of Cheng’s album in Taiwan surpassed 300,000 copies, Warner Music Taiwan organized an autograph session for her in Kaohsiung. Following the event, Cheng remained in Taiwan for a week before returning to Hong Kong, leaving her with no further opportunity to develop her career in Taiwan.

== Singles ==
Seven singles were released from the album. The first three, "Absence", " Over The Border", and "I Deserved" are commercial singles intended for radios, TVs, and karaoke bars. The last four , "Never Enough", "Black Box" , "Prepared" and "Bad Habit" are promotional singles intended solely for karaoke bars.

“Absence” was selected as the album’s lead single and topped eight major charts across different regions, including the TVB8 Mandarin Music On Demand Top 10, 997 Metro Hit Chart, Yes! Hong Kong Pop Song Chart (where it held the No. 1 position for two weeks), Hong Kong Big Echo Karaoke Chart, Sinocast Radio New York Top Ten Chinese Gold Songs Chart,Singapore Dongli 88.3 Supreme Song Chart, Taiwan Hit FM Mandopop Chart, and Taiwan Cashbox Mandopop Karaoke Chart.

“Over the Border” was released as the album’s second single and topped the Taiwan Cashbox Mandopop Karaoke Chart for eight consecutive weeks,while also reaching number one on the Yes! Hong Kong Pop Song Chart.

"I Deserved" was released as the third and final commercial single, reaching number one on Taiwan Cashbox Mandopop karaoke chart.

“Never Enough” was released as the album’s first promotional single and reached number one on Taiwan Cashbox Mandopop Karaoke Chart.

== Accolades ==
Award	Year	Recipient(s) and nominee(s)	Category	Notes	Ref.
1999 JSG Selections 2nd Quarter	1999	"Absent" (缺席)	Top 10 Songs (十大金曲)		
1999 Dongli 88.3 Supreme Song Selections 3rd Quarter	22 August 1999	"Absent" (缺席)	Ranked No.1 among the Top 10 Supreme Songs (十大至尊金曲第1名)	Sammi Cheng “Absent “received strong support from fans. With an impressive score of 167 points, it has topped the Dongli 88.3 Supreme Song Chart' as the number one song in the 'Top Ten Supreme Songs' for the 3rd Quarter.".	
TVB8 Mandarin Music On Demand Awards Presentation 1999	1999	"Absent" (缺席)	Top 10 Songs (十大金曲)		
Hit FM Top 100 Singles of 1999	1999	"Absent" (缺席)	Ranked No. 20 among the Hit FM Top 100 Singles of 1999 (1999年Hit FM年度百首單曲排名第20位)		
Taiwan's Ten Best-Selling Albums of 1999	1999	"I Deserved" (我應該得到)	Ranked No. 8 among the Top 10 BEST-SELLING ALBUMS (十大暢銷專輯第八位)		
Singapore’s Ten Best-Selling Albums of 1999	1999	"I Deserved" (我應該得到)	Top 10 BEST-SELLING ALBUMS (十大暢銷專輯)		
1999 RTHK Top 10 Gold Songs Awards	January 23, 2000	Herself	Runner-up for the Best-Selling Music Artist (全年最高銷量歌手大獎銀獎)		
IFPI Hong Kong Top Sales Music Award	2000	Herself	The Best Sales Local Female Vocalist (全年最高銷量本地女歌手)		
Sinocast Radio 1999 New York Top Ten Chinese Gold Songs Award	February 2000	"Absent" (缺席)	Best Mandarin Song (全年最佳國語歌曲獎)		
Sinocast Radio 1999 New York Top Ten Chinese Gold Songs Award	February 2000	Herself	Best Female Artist (最佳女歌手)		

== Chart performance ==
I Deserved debuted at number five on IFPI (Hong Kong Group) and later peaked at number three.In Taiwan, the album charted on the IFPI Taiwan Local Top 20 for 14 weeks, nine of which were within the top ten, with a peak position at number three. In Singapore, the album topped the SPVA Top 10 Albums of the Week for six weeks, with a consecutive five‑week run at number one, and remained on the chart for a total of 35 weeks.

== Track listing ==
Credits adapted from the album's liner notes.

I Deserved – Taiwanese Standard edition
No.	Title	Length
1.	"Absence"	4:37
2.	"I Deserved"	4:45
3.	"Over the Border"	4:25
4.	"Never Enough"	3:55
5.	"Bad Habit"	5:12
6.	"Unhappiness"	5:33
7.	"Black Box"	4:58
8.	"City Talk"	4:01
9.	"Let Go Of Love"	4:38
10.	"Prepared"	4:48
Total length:		46:93

I Deserved –Hong Kong/Malaysian/Singaporean edition bonus tracks
No.	Title	Length
11.	"Our Theme Song"	3:36
Total length:		50:29

I Deserved –Taiwanese Second edition bonus cd
No.	Title	Length
1.	"Black Box (Besotted Version)"	5:27
2.	"Love Me Don't Go (Live Version)"	4:42

I Deserved –Hong Kong/Malaysian/Singaporean Second edition/Taiwanese Third edition bonus VCD
No.	Title	Length
1.	"Behind The Scenes"
2.	"Absence" (Music Video)
3.	"Never Enough" (Music Video)
Total length:		18:20

== Charts ==
Chart (1999)	Peak position
Hong Kong Albums (IFPI)	3
Taiwan Albums (IFPI)	3
Singaporean Albums(SPVA)	1

== Sales and certifications ==
Region	Certification	Certified units/sales
Hong Kong (IFPI Hong Kong)	Gold	100,000
Taiwan	—	550,000
Summaries
Asia	—	1,900,000
^{*} Sales figures based on certification alone.

== Release history ==
List of formats and editions of the album being released in each country, along with the date of the release
Country	Date	Format	Label	Edition	Ref.
Hong Kong	10 May 1999	CD	Warner Music Hong Kong	Hong Kong Standard edition	
Hong Kong	10 May 1999	CD	Warner Music Hong Kong	Hong Kong Deluxe edition	
Taiwan	10 May 1999	CD	Warner Music Taiwan	Taiwanese Standard edition	
Taiwan	10 May 1999	Cassette tape	Warner Music Taiwan	Taiwanese Standard edition	
Taiwan	10 May 1999	CD	Warner Music Taiwan	Taiwanese Deluxe edition (limited to 10,000 copies)	
Taiwan	10 May 1999	Cassette tape	Warner Music Taiwan	Taiwanese Deluxe edition (limited to 10,000 copies)	
Singapore	10 May 1999	CD	Warner Music Singapore	Singaporean Edition	
Malaysia	10 May 1999	CD	Warner Music Malaysia	Malaysian Edition	
Malaysia	10 May 1999	Cassette tape	Warner Music Malaysia	Malaysian Edition	
Indonesia	10 May 1999	CD	Warner Music Indonesia	Malaysian Import	
Indonesia	10 May 1999	Cassette tape	Warner Music Indonesia	Malaysian Import	
Canada	10 May 1999	CD	Warner Music	Hong Kong Import (Standard edition)	
Canada	10 May 1999	CD	Warner Music	Hong Kong Import (Deluxe edition)	
South Korea	10 May 1999	CD	Warner Music Korea	Taiwan Import	
South Korea	10 May 1999	Cassette tape	Warner Music Korea	Taiwan Import	
Taiwan	June 4, 1999	CD	Warner Music Taiwan	Taiwanese second edition	
Taiwan	July 26, 1999	CD	Warner Music Taiwan	Taiwanese third edition	
Canada	July 26, 1999	CD	Warner Music	Taiwan Import (Third edition)	
Singapore	18 August 1999	CD	Warner Music Singapore	Singaporean Second Edition	
Malaysia	18 August 1999	CD	Warner Music Malaysia	Malaysian Second Edition	
Hong Kong	18 August 1999	CD	Warner Music Hong Kong	Hong Kong Second Edition	
Taiwan	December 27, 2001	CD	Warner Music Taiwan	Reissue	
