= Yes Magazine =

Yes Magazine or Yes! Magazine may refer to:

- Yes! (U.S. magazine), an environmental and political magazine from the United States
- Yes! (Hong Kong magazine), a teen lifestyle magazine from Hong Kong
- Yes! (Philippine magazine), a showbiz-oriented magazine from the Philippines
