= Marry a Rich Man =

2002 Hong Kong film by Vincent Kok

- DVD cover
- Traditional Chinese: 嫁個有錢人
- Directed by: Vincent Kok
- Written by: Chan Po Chun; Fung Min-Hun; Vincent Kok; Erica Li; Wai Chi-Ho
- Produced by: Vincent Kok
- Starring: Sammi Cheng; Richie Jen
- Cinematography: Hang-Sang Poon
- Edited by: Kwong Chi-Leung
- Music by: Ronald Ng; Wong Dan-yee
- Distributed by: Golden Harvest
- Release date: 7 February 2002
- Running time: 93 minutes
- Country: Hong Kong
- Language: Cantonese

Marry a Rich Man is a 2002 Hong Kong romantic comedy film directed and co-written by Vincent Kok.

== Cast ==
- Sammi Cheng as Ah Mi
- Richie Jen as Christmas Yan
- Stefania De Peppe as Milan's city cop
- Maria Chen as Sonreysia
- Wah-Leung Chim as Wealthy Golfer
- Jan Lamb as Wilson
- Becky Lee as Chan Chai Chung
- Candy Lo as MT
- Terence Tsui as Uncle D's worker
- Wai-Keung Tung
- Quinton Wong
- Bowie Wu as Uncle D
