= Sammi Karaoke Chart-Topping Hits =

Video by Sammi Cheng
- Released: November 13, 2001
- Recorded: 2001
- Genre: Pop; dance-pop; synth-pop
- Language: Mandarin
- Label: Warner Music Taiwan

Sammi Cheng chronology
Complete (2001)	Sammi Karaoke Chart-Topping Hits (2001)	Love Is...flaunt (2001)

Singles from Sammi Karaoke Chart-Topping Hits
- 1. "Overjoyed (眉飛色舞)"

Sammi Karaoke Chart-Topping Hits (Mandarin: 鄭秀文：冠軍卡拉OK) is the second Mandarin-language video album by Hong Kong singer Sammi Cheng, released by Warner Music Taiwan on November 13, 2001. The video album contained Sammi's the ten number-one singles on the Taiwan Cashbox Mandopop Karaoke Chart.

== Background ==
After Taiwanese media had formally referred to Sammi Cheng as the ‘Karaoke Queen’ for her karaoke‑friendly hits in late 2000, Warner Music Taiwan released Sammi Karaoke Chart-Topping Hits to commemorate the success of her single "Overjoyed (眉飛色舞)", which topped the Taiwan Cashbox Mandopop karaoke chart for 20 consecutive weeks and remained on the chart for a total of 60 weeks.

== Promotion ==
Warner Music Taiwan did not actively promote the video album. In North America, however, YesAsia carried online promotional advertisements for the release, including pre‑order information.

A second edition was released in July 2002 as a limited edition with updated packaging and formal promotional materials. Warner Music Taiwan described Sammi Cheng as a trendsetting diva whose status as the ‘Queen of Electronic Dance Music’ was firmly established. Fast-tempo tracks and choreographed dance songs were said to frequently appear on Mandopop karaoke charts, while her ballads were praised for their distinctive vocal style. Promotional copy referred to Cheng as the ‘Karaoke Queen of Electro Pop’ and highlighted songs such as "Overjoyed" (眉飛色舞), "Waiting for You" (癡癡為你等), and "Can’t Let You Go" (捨不得你) as must-request karaoke selections.

== Singles ==
In addition to "Overjoyed (眉飛色舞)", which topped the karaoke chart for 20 weeks, the album features "Out Bound" (出界) , which topped the karaoke chart for 8 weeks and "Promise" (承諾) , which topped the karaoke chart for 6 weeks, both of which were major karaoke hits in Taiwan.

== Accolades ==
Year	Publication	Recipient(s) and nominee(s)	Accolade	Ref.
2001	Cashbox Partyworld	Overjoyed (眉飛色舞)	The Most Popular Karaoke Song	
2001	HOLIDAY KTV	Overjoyed (眉飛色舞)	The Most Popular Karaoke Song	

== Track listing ==
Credits adapted from the album's liner notes

Sammi Karaoke Chart-Topping Hits –Taiwan Standard edition
No.	Title	Length
1.	"Overjoyed (眉飛色舞)"
2.	"I Deserved (我應該得到)"
3.	"Out Bound (出界)"
4.	"Waiting for You (癡癡為你等)"
5.	"Can't Let You Go (捨不得你)"
6.	"Absent (缺席)"
7.	"Never Enough (永遠都不夠)"
8.	"Promise (承諾)"
9.	"If I were you (如果我是你)"
10.	"Worth It (值得)"

== Commercial performance ==
Although karaoke video albums were not included in Taiwan’s official album sales charts, Sammi Karaoke Chart-Topping Hits still had commercial impact in the Taiwanese market. A second edition was later released, reflecting its sustained popularity.

In North America,the video album reached number one on YesAsia’s video album sales chart.

== Release history ==
List of formats and editions of the album being released in each country, along with the date of the release
Country	Date	Format	Edition	Label	Ref.
Hong Kong	November 13, 2001	VCD	Taiwan import	Warner Music Hong Kong	
Canada	November 13, 2001	VCD	Taiwan import	Warner Music	
Taiwan	November 13, 2001	VCD	Taiwanese edition	Warner Music Taiwan	
Singapore	November 13, 2001	VCD	Singaporean edition	Warner Music Singapore	
Malaysia	November 13, 2001	VCD	Malaysian edition	Warner Music Malaysia	
Taiwan	July 2002	VCD	Taiwanese second edition	Warner Music Taiwan	
