= Worth It (album) =

Studio album by Sammi Cheng
- Released: September 2, 1996
- Recorded: 1996
- Genre: Pop
- Language: Mandarin
- Label: Warner Music Group

Sammi Cheng chronology
Never Want to Give You Up (1996)	Worth It (1996)	Deep Passion (1996)

Worth It (Chinese: 值得) is the first Mandarin-language studio album by Hong Kong singer Sammi Cheng. Commercially, the album surpassed her previous two Cantonese albums within the first three weeks, debuting at number one on the Taiwanese album chart, where it remained for six consecutive weeks.

== Singles and music videos ==
Music videos were made for three singles: Zhídé (Worth It), "Bèipàn" (Betrayal) and "Yīkào" (Reliance).

== Track listing ==
1. Zhídé 值得
2. bèipàn 背叛
3. xiāngféng bù hèn wǎn 相逢不恨晚
4. wéi xūn 微醺
5. jiù xiàngliàn 舊項鏈
6. céng shì nǐ de bǎobèi 曾是你的寶貝
7. wúsuǒwèi 無所謂
8. xiǎoxīn nǚrén (huī gūniáng) 小心女人 (Cinderella)
9. yīkào 依靠
10. zhànlǐng 佔領
11. yíngfēng 迎風
12. cuìruò 脆弱

== Charts ==
Chart (1996)	Peak position
Taiwanese Albums (IFPI Taiwan)	1

== Sales and certifications ==
Region	Certification	Certified units/sales
Hong Kong	—	30,000
Taiwan (RIT)	Platinum+Gold	700,000
