= Best of the Best (1992 film) =

1992 Hong Kong film by Herman Yau

- Film poster
- Traditional Chinese: 飛虎精英之人間有情
- Simplified Chinese: 飞虎精英之人间有情
- Hanyu Pinyin: Fēi Hǔ Jīng Yīng Zhī Rén Jiān Yǒu Qíng
- Jyutping: Fei1 Fu2 Zing1 Jing1 Zi1 Jan4 Gaan1 Jau2 Cing4
- Directed by: Herman Yau
- Screenplay by: Herman Yau; Tony Leung; James Fung
- Produced by: Stephen Shin; Tony Leung
- Starring: Jacky Cheung; Ng Man-tat; Sammi Cheng; Paul Chun; Carrie Ng
- Cinematography: Ng Kin-man
- Edited by: Wong Wing-ming
- Music by: Richard Lo
- Production company: Galaxy Films
- Distributed by: Regal Films Distribution; Media Asia Group
- Release date: 29 May 1992
- Running time: 82 minutes
- Country: Hong Kong
- Language: Cantonese
- Box office: HK$6,422,069

Best of the Best is a 1992 Hong Kong action film directed by Herman Yau and starring Jacky Cheung, Ng Man-tat and Sammi Cheng in her debut film role.

== Plot ==
Little Ball (Ng Man-tat) is a retired police officer who works as a beverage server in a bar. However, he has not changed his bad habits of being loud-mouth and compulsive drinking and gambling. Fortunately, he is helped and taken care by his confidant, Hung (Carrie Ng). One time, Ball unintentionally got his son, Dee (Jacky Cheung), a Special Duties Unit officer, into a dispute with triad leader, Ngan Kwan (Paul Chun), nearly destroying his son's career.

At the same time, Dee also meets Heidi (Sammi Cheng) during a police operation and a romantic relationship ensued between them. However, things do not go well for long when Heidi is discovered to be Ngan's daughter. Ngan forces Dee to resign from his job, but Dee has a strong sense of righteousness and firmly rejects Ngan and proceeds to go on vacation with Heidi on Lantau Island. Seeing how Dee disregards him and also thinking that he is eloping with his daughter, Ngan orders his underlings to find and kill Dee. When Ball hears of this, he goes to plead Ngan, but he gets beaten instead. Later, a group of killers surround Dee in the streets and when he fell into danger, the wounded Ball appears and sacrifices his life to rescue his son. At this time, Dee realises his father's love for him and vows to seek vengeance on Ngan.

== Cast ==
- Jacky Cheung as Lee Man-kit / Dee
  - William Chu as young Lee Man-kit
- Ng Man-tat as Little Ball
- Sammi Cheng as Heidi
- Paul Chun as Ngan Kwan
- Carrie Ng as Hung
- John Ching as Tsuen
- Leung Sap-yat as Hong
- Richard Cheung as Brother Keung
- Victor Hon as Brother Nine Teeth
- Lee Siu-kei as SDU instructor
- To Siu-chuen as KK
- Mai Kei as Scalper
- Jack Wong as Robber at mall
- Tang Tai-wo as Robber at mall
- Wan Seung-lam as Robber at mall
- Joe Chu as Robber at mall
- Lee Yiu-king as Hitman
- Ho Wing-cheung as Kwan's thug
- Choi Hin-cheung as Kwan's thug
- Leung Kei-hei as Brother Hung
- Leung Sam as Temple sticks interpreter
- Simon Cheung as Policeman
- Fung Man-kwong as Kwan's thug
- Kent Chow as Kwan's thug
- Chung Wing as Kwan's thug
- Ling Chi-hung as Kwan's thug
- Wong King-wai as Kwan's thug
- Alex Yip as Kwan's thug
- Lam Chi-tai as Kwan's thug

== Reception ==
=== Critical ===
Love HK Film gave the film a mixed review, noting its plot as nothing new with "no great shakes", but also praising its acting as "better-than-average".

=== Box office ===
The film grossed HK$6,422,069 at the Hong Kong box office during its theatrical run from 29 May to 10 June 1992 in Hong Kong.
