= Shocking Pink (album) =

2001 studio album by Sammi Cheng

Studio album by Sammi Cheng
- Released: 20 July 2001
- Recorded: 2001
- Studios: Tang Lou Studio, Moon Studio, Megaforce Studio (Taipei), Li Feng Studio (Taiwan)
- Genres: Pop; dance-pop; synth-pop
- Length: 38:48
- Language: Cantonese
- Label: Warner Music Hong Kong
- Producers: Adky Wun, Sandee Chan, Jason Choi, Peter Kam, Mark Lui

Sammi Cheng chronology
Complete (2001)	Shocking Pink (2001)	Tender (2001)

Singles from Shocking Pink
- 1. "Doctor and I [From "Fighting for Love"]"; 2. "Beautiful Life [From "Love on a Diet"]"; 3. "Shocking Pink"; 4. "Feel Happy That Day? [From "Fighting for Love"]"; 5. "Pose of Living World"; 6. "Just For It"; 7. "Unbearable Touch [From "Love on a Diet"]"

Shocking Pink (Cantonese: 螢光粉紅) is the twenty-third studio album and the eighteenth Cantonese studio album by Hong Kong singer Sammi Cheng. Released on 20 July 2001, by Warner Music Hong Kong. In Hong Kong, the album sold over 70,000 copies within the first four days, and reached nearly 120,000 copies within two weeks. A few weeks later, it achieved triple platinum status, with total sales exceeding 160,000 copies. It became one of the top ten best-selling albums on IFPI Hong Kong Top Sales Music Award presented 2001.

== Composition ==
The album features a mix of upbeat tracks, ballads, sentimental ballads, pop-rock, synth-pop, dance-pop and techno tracks, reflecting Cheng's ability to handle different musical styles. Cheng worked with several prominent producers and songwriters, including Adky Wun, Vicky Fung, Sandee Chan, Jason Choi, Peter Kam and Mark Lui.

== Promotion ==
Due to the immense popularity of the films Love on a Diet and Fighting for Love, in which Sammi Cheng starred as the leading actress, the box office results were outstanding. Riding on this wave of success, the album's sales soared without the need for extensive promotion.

The films significantly boosted her singing career, but she still promoted the album through a few events, TV appearances, interviews, and features in magazines and newspapers.

Additionally, She held a total of twelve "Shocking Colors" concerts at the Hong Kong Coliseum starting on September 7, 2001 which were hailed by Hong Kong media as the Highest-grossing concerts. This also drove the sales of the albums of Shocking Pink, Complete and Love Is... . However, the albums sold outside the concert venues were not counted in the sales figures verified by the Hong Kong IFPI, resulting in a portion of the sales being unaccounted for.

== Singles ==
In Hong Kong, six singles were released from the album. The first three, "Doctor and I" [From "Fighting for Love"]," " "Beautiful Life" [From "Love on a Diet"]", and "Shocking Pink" are commercial singles intended for radios, TVs, and karaoke bars. The last three, "Feel Happy That Day?" [From "Fighting for Love"], "Pose of Living World" and "Just For It" are promotional singles intended solely for film and TV Drama.

"Doctor and I" [From "Fighting for Love"] was chosen as the album's lead single, "Beautiful Life " [From "Love on a Diet"] was released as the second single, peaking at number one on three major charts. It maintained that position for one week on the RTHK Chinese pop chart. Additionally, it was also so popular in karaoke bars that it shot straight to the top of the karaoke charts for a few weeks. "Shocking Pink" was released as the third and final commercial single, reaching number one on one major chart.

=== Accolades ===
Publication	Nominee	Accolade
2001 JSG Selections 3rd Quarter	"Beautiful Life"	Most Popular Song Award
Ultimate Song Chart Awards Presentation 2001	"Beautiful Life"	Top 10 Songs Award
2001 Metro Radio Hits Music Awards	"Beautiful Life"	Top 10 Songs Award
2001 Jade Solid Gold Best 10 Awards Presentation	"Beautiful Life"	Top 10 Songs Award
2001 Malaysia Music Awards	"Beautiful Life"	Top 10 Songs Award
2001 RTHK Top 10 Gold Songs Awards	"Beautiful Life"	Top 10 Songs Award
2001 Fairchild Radio Calgary Music Awards	"Beautiful Life"	Top 10 Songs Award
2001 Fairchild Radio Calgary Music Awards	"Beautiful Life"	Best Song Award
21st Hong Kong Film Awards	"Beautiful Life"	Best Original Film Song

== Track listing ==
Credits adapted from the album's liner notes

Shocking Pink –Hong Kong Standard edition
No.	Title	Music	Length
1.	"Shocking Pink"		3:39
2.	"She's a Lady"	Paul Anka	3:30
3.	"Beautiful Life [From "Love on a Diet"]"		3:26
4.	"Doctor and I [From "Fighting for Love"]"		3:05
5.	"Hopeful Love"		3:09
6.	"Feel Happy That Day? [From "Fighting for Love"]"		3:23
7.	"Infinity"		4:12
8.	"Pose of Living World"		3:14
9.	"Unlucky Angel"		3:59
10.	"Just For It"		3:49
11.	"Unbearable Touch [From "Love on a Diet"]"		3:24
Total length:			38:48

VCD
No.	Title	Length
1.	"Untitled"	0:31
2.	"Beautiful Life [From "Love on a Diet"]" (Music Video)	3:27
3.	"Doctor and I [From "Fighting for Love"]" (Music Video)	3:19
Total length:		7:17

VCD（Second Edition）
No.	Title	Length
1.	"Shocking Pink" (Music Video)
2.	"Pose of Living World" (Music Video)
3.	"Beautiful Life [From "Love on a Diet"]" (Music Video)
4.	"Doctor and I [From "Fighting for Love"]" (Music Video)

== Commercial performance ==
Shocking Pink debuted at number one on HMV Asia Sales Chart, It maintained that position for a few weeks. (Note: The information is incomplete)

== Charts ==
After the Hong Kong IFPI Top 10 Album Sales Chart was discontinued in April 2001, the HMV Asia Sales Chart became the primary source for Hong Kong album sales data. "Shocking Pink" became the Best-selling album on the HMV Year-end chart that year.

== Accolades ==
Publication	Accolade	Ref.
2001 Hong Kong Top Sales Music Awards	The Best Sales Cantonese Release	

== Release history ==
List of formats and editions of the album being released in each country, along with the date of the release
Country	Date	Format	Edition	Label	Ref.
Hong Kong	20 July 2001	CD	Hong Kong edition	Warner Music Hong Kong	
Canada	25 July 2001	CD	Hong Kong import	Warner Music	
Taiwan	9 August 2001	CD	Taiwanese edition	Warner Music Taiwan	
Singapore	9 August 2001	CD	Singaporean edition	Warner Music Singapore	
Malaysia	9 August 2001	CD	Malaysian edition	Warner Music Malaysia	
Malaysia	9 August 2001	Cassette	Malaysian edition	Warner Music Malaysia	
Indonesia	9 August 2001	CD	Malaysian import	Warner Music Indonesia	
Indonesia	9 August 2001	Cassette	Malaysian import	Warner Music Indonesia	
Hong Kong	19 September 2001	CD	Hong Kong second edition	Warner Music Hong Kong	
Singapore	19 September 2001	CD	Singaporean second edition	Warner Music Singapore	
