= 1:99 Concert =

Fund raiser concert for victims of the 2003 SARS outbreak at the Hong Kong Stadium

- Fundraiser concert by Anita Mui; Andy Lau; Leon Lai; Aaron Kwok; Jacky Cheung; Nicholas Tse; Joey Yung; Sammi Cheng; Eason Chan; Kelly Chen; William So
- Venue: Hong Kong Stadium
- Start date: 2003
- End date: 2003

The 1:99 Concert was a fund raiser concert for victims of the 2003 SARS outbreak at the Hong Kong Stadium. The name 1:99 came from the bleach to water ratio that health officials recommended for anti-SARS cleaning solution. The concert was organized by Ellen Cheng of the Hong Kong Performing Artistes Guild. Various sources reported different amount raised. According to some sources, HK$22 million was raised. US$2.21 million was raised with the proceeds going to a fund providing education grants for children from SARS-affected families. Severe acute respiratory syndrome killed 262 and sickened over 1,700 in Hong Kong during that time period.

== Preparation ==
The concert started after 4pm and ended at 11pm, but rehearsals started several hours earlier.

== Performers ==
- Anita Mui
- Andy Lau
- Leon Lai
- Aaron Kwok
- Jacky Cheung
- Nicholas Tse
- Joey Yung
- Sammi Cheng
- Eason Chan
- Kelly Chen
- William So

== Complaints ==
Police received five complaints, including at least two from non-Chinese residents about high noise levels between 12.35pm and 11pm. The event organizers had sent out more than 7,000 letters to people living nearby to explain why the concert was being held and that they were hoping to raise money for youngsters who had been orphaned during the SARS outbreak. Members who defended the concert against complainers included Ho Kam-wah (何錦華) of the HKPAG, William So, Helena Ma and Kary Ng of the group Cookies.
