= Nude (Sammi Cheng EP) =

EP by Sammi Cheng
- Released: 14 February 2017
- Recorded: 2016
- Genre: Mandopop
- Length: 22:16
- Language: Mandarin
- Label: Media Asia Music
- Producer: Alex Ni, Jason Choi, Josef Tse, Jonathan Wong, Keith Leung

Sammi Cheng chronology
Touch Mi 2 (2017)	Nude (2017)	Believe In Mi (2018)

Singles from Nude
- 1. "Love Without Fear"; 2. "Sense and Sensibility"; 3. "Breakfast in Bed"; 4. "Love Hurt"

Nude (Mandarin: 裸) is the first Mandarin extended play by Hong Kong singer Sammi Cheng. It was released on 14 February 2017, by Media Asia Music in Hong Kong. The album was initially scheduled for release in November 2016 but was delayed due to Cheng's health issues. The album was a commercial success, It became one of the top ten best-selling albums on YesAsia in 2017.

== Composition ==
The album incorporates a range of styles, blending sentimental ballads, soft rock, electropop with mid-tempo tracks. Cheng worked with several producers and songwriters, including Alex Ni, Jason Choi, Josef Tse, Jonathan Wong and Keith Leung.

== Background and release ==
The EP marked Cheng's return to the Mandarin music scene after a seven-year hiatus. The album features a mix of ballads and mid-tempo tracks, showcasing Cheng's versatility as a singer. Despite limited promotion, the album achieved commercial success, topping various music charts in Hong Kong and Taiwan.

The physical album was released in Hong Kong, while the edition available in Taiwan was a Hong Kong import. It quickly became highly sought after and sold out. After selling out, no additional stock was supplied. Since the album was discontinued shortly after its release in Hong Kong, the Taiwan market was unable to receive any further stock.

== Promotion ==
Promotion for Nude was minimal. Cheng held two concerts titled "Nude Live" to promote the album: one in Taipei at ATT SHOWBOX, which was open to the public, and another in Beijing at the Sugar Star Light Live house, which was a private event.

== Singles ==
In Hong Kong, four singles were released from the album. "Love Without Fear" was released as the album's first single, topping one major charts. "Sense and Sensibility" served as the album's second single. "Breakfast in Bed" was released as the third single, reaching number three on one major chart. "Love Hurts" was released as the album's fourth single and final single, reaching number one on one major chart.

== Commercial performance ==
In Taiwan, Nude debuted at number one on the Taiwan Five Top Chart and peaked at number one on the i Radio Chinese Golden Songs chart. In Hong Kong, Nude debuted at number one on the Sky Music Chart and remained at the top for three consecutive weeks. It also topped the HMV Asia Sales Chart for three consecutive weeks. Additionally, the album stayed on the Hong Kong Record Merchants Association Sales Chart for seven weeks and was one of the top ten best-selling albums on YesAsia in 2017.

== Track listing ==
Credits adapted from the album's liner notes

Nude –Hong Kong Standard edition
No.	Title	Length
1.	"Love Without Fear"	04:32
2.	"Breakfast in Bed"	03:49
3.	"Play It Cool"	02:55
4.	"Love Hurts"	03:57
5.	"I Get to Love You"	03:21
6.	"Sense and Sensibility"	03:42
Total length:		22:16

== Release history ==
List of formats and editions
Country	Date	Format	Label	Edition	Ref.
Hong Kong	14 February 2017	CD, digital download	Media Asia Music	Hong Kong edition	
Taiwan	14 February 2017	CD, digital download	Warner Music Taiwan	Hong Kong import	
