= Love You Very Much =

Studio album by Sammi Cheng
- Released: September 22, 1999
- Recorded: August 1999
- Genre: Cantopop
- Length: 46:34
- Label: Warner Music Hong Kong
- Producers: Mark Lui,Conrad Wong, C.Y. Kong, Ronald Ng Lok Shing, Jason Choi

Sammi Cheng chronology
I Deserved (1999)	Love You Very Much (1999)	Thank You: New Songs & Greatest Hits (1999)

Singles from Love You Very Much
- 1. "Shinning"; 2. "Episode"; 3. "Fatalism"; 4. "Alternative Men and Women"

Love You Very Much (Cantonese : 很愛很愛) is the eighteenth studio album and the fifteenth Cantonese-language studio album by Hong Kong singer Sammi Cheng. It was released on September 22, 1999 by Warner Music Hong Kong The album marked Cheng’s receipt of favorable reviews from overseas music critics and further consolidated her presence in the Southeast Asian market. Its music incorporates Cantopop with influences from ballad, Euro house, adult contemporary, synth‑pop, and pop rock. In Hong Kong ,The album was certified double platinum by IFPI and the Hong Kong Record Merchants Association with sales of 100,000 copies.Across Asia, total sales reached 450,000 copies.

Together with her Cantonese album Listen To Sammi and Mandarin album I Deserved , the album enabled Cheng to receive the award for Best Sales Local Female Vocalist of 1999 from IFPI (Hong Kong Group), as well as the runner‑up position for Best-Selling Music Artist of 1999 presented by the Hong Kong Record Merchants Association.

== Background and development ==
Since the departure of her manager Frankie Lee Chun from Warner Music, Cheng had been seeking a new Management Company. On 7 July 1999, she officially announced her signing with Gold Label Management Company. At the same time, she revealed plans to record her second Cantonese studio album of 1999 and to stage seven concerts at the Hong Kong Coliseum in October of the same year.

After the “Sunkist Sammi Cheng Shining Guangzhou Concert” in August, Cheng stated in an interview that she was continuing recording sessions for her album while preparing for her Hong Kong concert in October.

== Composition ==
The album incorporates a range of contemporary Cantopop styles, blending ballads, Euro house, adult contemporary, synth‑pop, pop rock with up-tempo tracks. Cheng worked with several producers and songwriters, including Mark Lui,Conrad Wong, C.Y. Kong, Ronald Ng Lok Shing, Jason Choi, Stanley and Eddie Ng Kwok King.

== Concept and imagery ==
The styling of the album leaned towards a feminine aesthetic, expressed through long, curly wigs that conveyed a sense of grace, while the clothing adopted a more androgynous yet stylishly sensual approach.

== Promotion ==
Cheng promoted the album through a series of live performances at events and on television. She also participated in interviews and was featured in magazines and newspapers. In addition, Warner Music distributed exclusive promotional posters through karaoke bars as part of the publicity campaign.

=== Sammi I Concert 99 ===
Cheng staged a large‑scale concert series entitled Chase Sammi I Concert 99, which consisted of seven shows at the Hong Kong Coliseum from 21 to 27 October 1999 and marked her first use of a four‑sided stage. Due to overwhelming demand, an additional performance was announced on 25 October and subsequently held on 30 October. The concert craze also boosted album sales, with the second single, Interlude, gaining further popularity as a result of the shows.

== Singles ==
Four singles were released from the album: ‘Shinning,’ ‘Episode’, ‘Fatalism,’ and ‘Alternative Men and Women.’ These commercial singles were intended for radio, television, and karaoke bars .

‘Shinning’ was selected as the album’s lead single and topped ten major charts, including the TVB JSG Billboard Top 10, RTHK Chinese Pop Chart, Metro Hit Chart, 903 Chart, Hong Kong Big Echo Karaoke Chart, Fairchild Radio Canadian Chinese Pop Music Chart, and Sinocast Radio New York Top Ten Chinese Gold Songs Chart.

“Episode” was released as the album’s second single and topped seven major charts, including the TVB JSG Billboard Top 10, 997 Metro Hit Chart, RTHK Chinese Pop Chart, 903 Chart, FM Select 104 chart, CR1 FM 88.1 chart (two consecutive weeks at number 1）,Hong Kong Big Echo Karaoke Chart (where it recorded 400,000 karaoke requests within 21 days, ranking first across Hong Kong), Fairchild Radio Canadian Chinese Pop Music Chart, and Sinocast Radio New York Top Ten Chinese Gold Songs Chart.

== Critical reception ==
On release, Love You Very Much received favorable reviews from music critics. A Singaporean reviewer from Shin Min Daily News praised Cheng’s vocal performance, noting that she handled both uptempo and ballad songs with exceptional skill. In addition, a Taiwanese reviewer from MTV Asia commended the album as an enjoyable and high‑quality work, describing it as a masterpiece above standard from beginning to end. The reviewer highlighted the careful song selection by the production team and emphasized that Cheng once again demonstrated her strength as a Canto‑pop diva, proving that her reputation as a leading Hong Kong singer was well‑deserved. Her vocals were noted for their power and technical control, with evident dedication to the vocal parts across several tracks. The reviewer further remarked that Cheng’s singing style was comfortable and unpretentious, with embellishments delivered naturally and at the right moments, allowing listeners to immerse themselves in both her voice and the melodies.

== Accolades ==
Award	Year	Recipient(s) and nominee(s)	Category	Notes	Ref.
1999 JSG Selections 3rd Quarter	1999	"Shinning" (發熱發亮)	Top 10 Songs (十大金曲)		
1999 JSG Selections 4th Quarter	1999	"Episode" (插曲)	Top 10 Songs (十大金曲)		
1999 Metro Radio Hits Music Awards	December 1999	"Episode" (插曲)	Best Song (勁爆歌曲)		
1999 Metro Radio Hits Music Awards	December 1999	Herself	Metro Radio Hit Female Artist (勁爆女歌手獎)		
1999 Jade Solid Gold Best Ten Music Awards Presentation	January 16, 2000	"Episode" (插曲)	Top 10 Songs (十大金曲)		
1999 Jade Solid Gold Best Ten Music Awards Presentation	January 16, 2000	"Episode" (插曲)	Gold song gold award (金曲金獎)		
1999 RTHK Top 10 Gold Songs Awards	January 23, 2000	"Episode" (插曲)	Top 10 Songs (十大金曲)		
1999 RTHK Top 10 Gold Songs Awards	January 23, 2000	"Episode" (插曲)	The Most Popular Karaoke Song (最愛歡迎卡拉OK歌曲獎)		
1999 RTHK Top 10 Gold Songs Awards	January 23, 2000	Herself	Runner-up for the Best-Selling Music Artist (全年最高銷量歌手大獎銀獎)		
IFPI Hong Kong Top Sales Music Award	2000	Herself	The Best Sales Local Female Vocalist (全年最高銷量本地女歌手)		
Global Radio Incorporated Chicago Chinese Song Chart Awards Presentation 1999	2000	"Episode" (插曲)	Top Ten Favorite Songs (十大至愛歌曲)		
Global Radio Incorporated Chicago Chinese Song Chart Awards Presentation 1999	2000	Herself	Best Female Artist (Gold Award) (最佳女歌手(金獎))		

== Chart performance ==
“Love You Very Much ” debuted at number one on IFPI (Hong Kong Group), maintained that position for one week. It stayed on the chart for 8 weeks. In Singapore, the album debuted at number three on SPVA Top 10 Albums of the Week.

== Track listing ==
Credits adapted from the album's liner notes.

Love You Very Much – Hong Kong Standard edition
No.	Title	Length
1.	"Shinning"
2.	"Episode"
3.	"Fatalism"
4.	"Love You Very Much"
5.	"Moon Sign"
6.	"Whirlwind"
7.	"Alternative Men and Women"
8.	"Choose One out of the Two Lovers"
9.	"Touch!"
10.	"Sweetness"
11.	"Can't Have Too Much"
12.	"Episode （Mandarin）"
Total length:		46:34

== Charts ==
Chart (1999)	Peak position
Hong Kong Albums (IFPI)	1
Singaporean Albums(SPVA)	3

== Sales and certifications ==
Region	Certification	Certified units/sales
Hong Kong (IFPI Hong Kong)	2× Platinum	100,000
Summaries
Asia	—	450,000
^{*} Sales figures based on certification alone.

== Release history ==
List of formats and editions of the album being released in each country, along with the date of the release
Country	Date	Format	Label	Edition	Ref.
Hong Kong	September 22, 1999	CD	Warner Music Hong Kong	Hong Kong edition	
Hong Kong	September 22, 1999	MD	Warner Music Hong Kong	Hong Kong edition	
Canada	September 22, 1999	CD	Warner Music	Hong Kong Import	
Singapore	September 22, 1999	CD	Warner Music Singapore	Singaporean edition	
Malaysia	September 22, 1999	CD	Warner Music Malaysia	Malaysian Edition	
Malaysia	September 22, 1999	Cassette tape	Warner Music Malaysia	Malaysian Edition	
Indonesia	September 25, 1999	CD	Warner Music Indonesia	Malaysian Import	
Indonesia	September 25, 1999	Cassette tape	Warner Music Indonesia	Malaysian Import	
South Korea	September 30, 1999	CD	Warner Music Korea	Korean Edition	
South Korea	September 30, 1999	Cassette tape	Warner Music Korea	Korean Edition	
Taiwan	October 4, 1999	CD	Warner Music Taiwan	Taiwanese edition	
Taiwan	15 January 2002	CD	Warner Music Taiwan	Reissue	
