= Listen to Sammi =

Studio album by Sammi Cheng
- Released: 5 January 1999
- Recorded: 1998
- Genre: Cantopop
- Length: 45:41
- Label: Warner Music Hong Kong
- Producers: Conrad Wong, Calvin Choy Yat Chi

Sammi Cheng chronology
Feel So Good (1998)	Listen to Sammi (1999)	I Deserved (1999)

Singles from Listen To Sammi
- 1. "Wish You Happy"; 2. "My Pet"; 3. "The Right Lover (Heaven Version)"; 4. "Loving You Is My Life’s Ideal"

Listen to Sammi (Cantonese: 聽聞) is the sixteenth studio album and the fourteenth Cantonese-language studio album by Hong Kong singer Sammi Cheng. It was released on 5 January 1999 by Warner Music Hong Kong. The album marked Cheng’s renewed prominence in the Cantopop market following her contract renewal with Warner Music. Its music incorporates Cantopop with influences from genres such as hip hop, alternative dance, R&B, adult contemporary, synth‑pop, and acoustic music. In Hong Kong, the album was certified double platinum by IFPI and the Hong Kong Record Merchants Association, with sales of 110,000 copies. Together with her Cantonese album Love You Very Much and Mandarin album I Deserved, the album enabled Cheng to receive the award for Best Sales Local Female Vocalist of 1999 from IFPI (Hong Kong Group), as well as the runner‑up position for Best-Selling Music Artist of 1999 presented by the Hong Kong Record Merchants Association.

== Background and development ==
On 5 February 1998, Cheng stated in an interview that, following the conclusion of several music award ceremonies, she intended to reduce her workload. She explained that this meant releasing fewer albums, as she did not wish to release records too frequently. As a result, only one Cantonese-language album, Feel So Good, was released that year. In June 1998, her manager Frankie Lee Chun departed from Warner Music, while Cheng’s contract with the label was nearing expiration. Negotiations over the renewal of the contract created further complications, leading to a decline in her public exposure during the latter half of 1998. It was not until November 1998 that she finalized a contract renewal with Warner Music, during which she also began recording sessions for her Cantonese studio album Listen to Sammi.

On 27 December 1998, Warner Music announced that Sammi Cheng had renewed her contract with the label and that a new Cantonese-language album, Listen to Sammi, would soon be released. A press conference entitled “Crossing into the 2000s: A New Century Agreement (飛越2000世紀之約)” was scheduled for 5 January 1999, which included a contract renewal ceremony as well as promotion for the album.

Warner Music also printed invitation cards for major media outlets. The cover featured a snow mountain background, symbolizing Cheng’s elevated status and her secure position at the pinnacle of the Mandopop and Cantopop scenes as a diva. The inner pages displayed a promotional image from her upcoming album, conveying a sense of purity and innocence, reminiscent of a young girl.

== Composition ==
The album incorporates a range of contemporary Cantopop styles, blending ballads, Hip Hop,Alternative Dance, Contemporary R&B, Adult Contemporary ,Synth-pop ,Acoustic music with up-tempo tracks. Cheng worked with several producers and songwriters, including Conrad Wong, Calvin Choy Yat Chi, Carl Wong Sheung Chun, Keith Leung, Stanley and Schumann Lee.

== Concept and imagery ==
The album’s styling adopted an androgynous cold‑girl makeup look, creating a fresh and cool atmosphere with an effortless glow, as if Cheng had just returned from a brisk winter walk outdoors. Its defining features included slightly ruddy, dry winter cheeks and frosted highlights. This makeup style is colloquially referred to in Cantonese as ‘爆擦妝’ (Ruddy Cheeks Look). In April 1997, Cheng had previously experimented with this makeup style, which sparked a trend at the time; in its revised form, it conveyed a stronger sense of winter aesthetics.

During an interview, Cheng revealed that the most distinctive aspect of the cover was the background, which depicted a painted snow mountain beneath a star‑filled night sky. However, the light on her face was daylight. This type of design was rarely seen in her previous covers, and Cheng stated that she was very fond of it. Cheng further explained that although the cover presented a snowy scene, no real snow was used. For example, the snow on the ground was made of coarse salt, the falling snow consisted of foam pellets, and the snow on her head was created from other materials, with additional computer effects applied. In this way, the album cover was completed.

== Promotion ==
Cheng promoted the album through a series of live performances at events and on television. She also participated in interviews and was featured in magazines and newspapers. Additionally, the album was supported by television advertisements. The promotional period was relatively short, as Cheng soon began preparing to record her third Mandarin-language studio album I Deserved.

Shortly thereafter, the television drama Man's Best Friend, featuring Sammi Cheng in the leading role, was released and achieved significant popularity. The drama’s theme song, ‘The Right Lover（Heaven Version）,’ along with the interludes ‘You Only’ and ‘Wish You Happy,’ were performed by Cheng. The exposure from the drama also contributed to boosting album sales.

=== Press Conference ===
On 5 January 1999, Warner Music held a press conference entitled Crossing into the 2000s: A New Century Agreement (飛越2000世紀之約). The event officially announced Cheng’s contract renewal with the label and also served to promote her Cantonese-language studio album Listen to Sammi, which was released on the same day.

== Singles ==
Four singles were released from the album: ‘Wish You Happy,’ ‘My Pet,’ ‘The Right Lover (Heaven Version),’ and ‘Loving You Is My Life’s Ideal.’ These commercial singles were intended for radio, television, and karaoke bars

“‘Wish You Happy’ was selected as the album’s lead single and topped five major charts, including the TVB JSG Billboard Top 10, RTHK Chinese Pop Chart, Hong Kong Big Echo Karaoke Chart, Fairchild Radio Canadian Chinese Pop Music Chart, and Sinocast Radio New York Top Ten Chinese Gold Songs Chart.

“My Pet” was released as the album’s second single and topped seven major charts, including the TVB JSG Billboard Top 10, 997 Metro Hit Chart, RTHK Chinese Pop Chart, 903 Chart, Hong Kong Big Echo Karaoke Chart (where it recorded 298,900 karaoke requests within 20 days, ranking first across Hong Kong), Fairchild Radio Canadian Chinese Pop Music Chart, and Sinocast Radio New York Top Ten Chinese Gold Songs Chart.

“The Right Lover” (Heaven Version) was released as the album’s third single, peaking at number five on the TVB JSG Billboard Top 10.

“Loving You Is My Life's Ideal” was released as the album’s fourth single and final commercial single, topping the Fairchild Radio Canadian Chinese Pop Music Chart.

== Accolades ==
Award	Year	Recipient(s) and nominee(s)	Category	Notes	Ref.
1998 JSG Selections 4th Quarter	1998	"Wish You Happy" (祝你快樂)	Top 10 Songs (十大金曲)		
1998 Jade Solid Gold Best Ten Music Awards Presentation	January 24, 1999	"Wish You Happy" (祝你快樂)	Top 10 Songs (十大金曲)		
1999 JSG Selections Ist Quarter	1999	"My Pet" (寵物)	Top 10 Songs (十大金曲)		
1999 RTHK Top 10 Gold Songs Awards	January 23, 2000	Herself	Runner-up for the Best-Selling Music Artist (全年最高銷量歌手大獎銀獎)		
IFPI Hong Kong Top Sales Music Award	2000	Herself	The Best Sales Local Female Vocalist (全年最高銷量本地女歌手)		
Sinocast Radio 1999 New York Top Ten Chinese Gold Songs Award	February 2000	"My Pet" (寵物)	top ten Chinese Song (金榜題名:十大金曲)		
Sinocast Radio 1999 New York Top Ten Chinese Gold Songs Award	February 2000	Herself	Best Female Artist (最佳女歌手)		

== Chart performance ==
“Listen To Sammi” debuted at number one on IFPI (Hong Kong Group), maintained that position for one week. It stayed on the chart for 10 weeks. In Malaysia, the album debuted at number 6 on RIM chart, later reaching number one for two weeks, and stayed on the chart for fifteen weeks in total.In Singapore, the album debuted at number two on SPVA Top 10 Albums of the Week.

== Track listing ==
Credits adapted from the album's liner notes.

Listen To Sammi – Hong Kong Standard edition
No.	Title	Length
1.	"Couldn't Care Less"
2.	"My Pet"
3.	"You Only"
4.	"Not Tonight"
5.	"No Medicine Can Help"
6.	"Wish You Happy"
7.	"The Right Lover"
8.	"Loving You Is My Life's Ideal"
9.	"Make An Exception"
10.	"Globetrotting"
11.	"The Right Lover（Heaven Version）"
12.	"My One And Only （Mandarin）"
Total length:		45:41

== Charts ==
Chart (1999)	Peak position
Hong Kong Albums (IFPI)	1
Malaysian Albums (RIM)	1
Singaporean Albums(SPVA)	2

== Sales and certifications ==
Region	Certification	Certified units/sales
Hong Kong (IFPI Hong Kong)	2× Platinum	110,000

== Release history ==
List of formats and editions of the album being released in each country, along with the date of the release
Country	Date	Format	Label	Edition	Ref.
Hong Kong	5 January 1999	CD	Warner Music Hong Kong	Hong Kong edition	
Hong Kong	5 January 1999	MD	Warner Music Hong Kong	Hong Kong edition	
Hong Kong	5 January 1999	Cassette tape	Warner Music Hong Kong	Hong Kong edition	
Canada	5 January 1999	CD	Warner Music	Hong Kong Import	
Hong Kong	12 January 1999	CD	Warner Music Hong Kong	Hong Kong Second edition	
Taiwan	12 January 1999	CD	Warner Music Taiwan	Taiwanese edition	
Taiwan	12 January 1999	Cassette tape	Warner Music Taiwan	Taiwanese edition	
Singapore	12 January 1999	CD	Warner Music Singapore	Singaporean Deluxe edition	
Malaysia	12 January 1999	CD	Warner Music Malaysia	Malaysian Edition	
Malaysia	12 January 1999	Cassette tape	Warner Music Malaysia	Malaysian Edition	
Indonesia	12 January 1999	CD	Warner Music Indonesia	Malaysian Import	
Indonesia	12 January 1999	Cassette tape	Warner Music Indonesia	Malaysian Import	
Singapore	February 1999	CD	Warner Music Singapore	Singaporean Standard edition	
Taiwan	15 January 2002	CD	Warner Music Taiwan	Reissue	
