= Never Want to Give You Up =

Studio album by Sammi Cheng
- Released: 29 May 1996
- Recorded: December 1995 – March 1996
- Genre: Pop; dance-pop; ballad; synth-pop
- Length: 40:28
- Language: Cantonese
- Label: Warner Music Hong Kong
- Producer: Alvin Leong, Mahmood Rumjahn, Stanley Leung

Sammi Cheng chronology
| Can't Let You Go (1995) | Never Want to Give You Up (1996) | Worth It (1996) |

Singles from Never Want to Give You Up
- 1. "Beware of Woman"; 2. "Never Want to Give You Up"; 3. "Owe You Nothing"; 4. "Colour ... Scent"; 5. "Asking Me"; 6. "Disagreement"

Never Want to Give You Up (Cantonese: 放不低) is the ninth Cantonese studio album by Hong Kong singer Sammi Cheng. Released on 29 May 1996, by Warner Music Hong Kong, the album features a mix of dance tracks and ballads. In Hong Kong, the album was a commercial success, achieving double platinum status shortly after its release. After three months, it was certified triple platinum. As of November 1996, the album sold 175,000 copies, making it the best-selling Cantonese album by female artist that year.

== Composition ==
The album incorporates a range of contemporary Cantopop styles, blending sentimental ballads, dance-pop with up-tempo tracks. Cheng worked with several producers and songwriters, including Alvin Leong, Mark Lui, Mahmood Rumjahn, Stanley Leung, Vicky Fung, C.Y. Kong and Andrew Lam.

== Promotion ==
Sammi Cheng promoted the album through various live performances, including events and TV appearances. She conducted various interviews and features in magazines and newspapers. Additionally, a giant outdoor billboard of the album was hung on the HMV building in Tsim Sha Tsui, Hong Kong.

The title track "Never Want to Give You Up" was used as the theme song for the TV drama "When a Woman Loves a Man" and was also featured in a commercial for Panasonic Discman, which helped it reach a wider audience. Additionally, "Disagreement" served as the interlude for the same TV drama.

Shortly thereafter, the film Feel 100% starring Sammi Cheng as the female lead was released and became highly popular. The film's theme song "Owe You Nothing" and the interludes "Asking Me" and "Colour... Scent", were performed by Cheng.

=== Autograph show ===
Warner Music Hong Kong organized two autograph sessions to promote the album, an unusual practice at the time as few singers held more than one signing event for a single release. To celebrate the album reaching double platinum status within its first week of release, the first session was held on 8 June 1996 from 2:00 to 3:00 pm at the Warner Bros Loves Hong Kong boutique (華納兄弟片埸精品店) in Tsim Sha Tsui. Following the album’s sales surpassing triple platinum, a second autograph session took place on 17 August 1996 at 11:00 am at HMV in Tsim Sha Tsui, where attendees were given a second edition of the promotional single ‘Never Want to Give You Up’ (Panasonic Special Version).”

== Singles ==
In Hong Kong, six singles were released from the album. The first three, "Beware Of Woman", "Never Want to Give You Up", and "Owe You Nothing", (from Feel 100%), are commercial singles intended for radios, TVs, and karaoke bars. The last three, "Asking Me" (from Feel 100% 1), "Colour ... Scent" and "Disagreement" are promotional singles intended solely for karaoke bars.

"Beware of Woman" was chosen as the album's lead single, topping four major charts. "Never Want to Give You Up" was released as the second single, peaking at number one on three major charts. "Owe You Nothing" (from Feel 100%) was released as the third and final commercial single, reaching number one on one major chart. It was also so popular in karaoke bars that it shot straight to the top of the karaoke charts for eight weeks.

== Accolades ==
| Year | Organization | Category | Nominee | Result |
|---|---|---|---|---|
| 1996 | JSG Selections 2nd Quarter | Top 10 Songs | "Beware of Woman" | Won |
| 1996 | JSG Selections 3rd Quarter | Top 10 Songs | "Never Want to Give You Up" | Won |
| 1996 | Metro Radio Hits Music Awards | Most popular karaoke song | "Owe You Nothing" | Won |
| 1996 | Youth Music Channel Music Awards | Most popular Cantonese song | "Owe You Nothing" | Won |
| 1996 | Malaysia PWH Music Awards | Most popular Cantonese song | "Owe You Nothing" | Won |
| 1996 | RTHK Top 10 Gold Songs Awards | Top 10 Songs | "Never Want to Give You Up" | Won |
| 1996 | RTHK Top 10 Gold Songs Awards | Best-selling female artist | Sammi Cheng | Won |

== Chart performance ==
Never Want to Give You Up debuted at number one on IFPI (Hong Kong Group), maintained that position for one week. It stayed in the chart for 12 weeks.

== Track listing ==
Credits adapted from the album's liner notes.

Never Want To Give You Up – Hong Kong Standard edition
| No. | Title | Length |
|---|---|---|
| 1. | "Beware of Woman" | 3:31 |
| 2. | "Never Want to Give You Up" | 3:59 |
| 3. | "Space" | 4:30 |
| 4. | "Colour ... Scent" | 3:18 |
| 5. | "Goodbye Summer Love" | 3:25 |
| 6. | "Disagreement" | 4:29 |
| 7. | "Owe You Nothing (from Feel 100%)" | 4:18 |
| 8. | "Asking Me (from Feel 100%)" | 3:40 |
| 9. | "Red Wine, White Wine" | 5:07 |
| 10. | "To Live For You For One Night Only" | 4:21 |
| Total length: | | 40:28 |

Never Want To Give You Up – Taiwanese Edition/Singaporean Edition/Malaysian Edition (bonus track)
| No. | Title | Length |
|---|---|---|
| 11. | "I Was Your Baby" | 3:59 |

== Charts ==
| Chart (1996) | Peak position |
|---|---|
| Hong Kong Albums (IFPI) | 1 |

== Sales and certifications ==
| Region | Certification | Certified units/sales |
|---|---|---|
| Hong Kong (IFPI Hong Kong) | 3× Platinum | 175,000 |

== Release history ==
List of formats and editions of the album being released in each country, along with the date of the release
| Region | Date | Format | Label | Edition | Ref. |
|---|---|---|---|---|---|
| Asia | 29 May 1996 | CD, cassette | Warner Music Hong Kong | Standard | |
| Canada | 14 June 1996 | CD, cassette | Warner Music | Hong Kong import | |
| South Korea | 24 June 1996 | CD, cassette | Warner Music Korea | Korean edition | |
| Hong Kong | 28 February 2001 | CD | Warner Music Hong Kong | Best Sound of Warner Music HDCD remaster series | |
| Taiwan | 15 January 2002 | CD | Warner Music Taiwan | Reissue | |
| Hong Kong | 21 December 2010 | CD | Warner Music Hong Kong | Golden reissue series | |
| Taiwan | 14 February 2014 | CD | Warner Music Taiwan | Golden reissue series | |
