= Yes! (Hong Kong magazine) =

Hong Kong teen lifestyle magazine

- Categories: Teen lifestyle
- Frequency: Weekly
- Founder: Joe Nieh (倪震); Simon Siu (邵國華)
- First issue: 20 November 1990
- Final issue: 25 July 2014
- Company: Megalink International Communications Ltd.
- Country: Hong Kong
- Based in: Hong Kong
- Language: Traditional Chinese
- Website: yesmagazine.com.hk
- ISSN: 1560-6058

Yes! was a Hong Kong teen lifestyle magazine (ISSN 1560-6058) with a slogan "All-weather Youth Magazine" (Chinese: 全天候年輕人雜誌). Founded by Joe Nieh (Chinese: 倪震) and Simon Siu (Chinese: 邵國華) on 20 November 1990, it was originally a semimonthly magazine published on every 5th and 20th of each month and priced at HK$10. Later it was changed to be published on every Friday (officially published on Friday, but usually sold in various bookstalls and convenience stores on Thursday, depending on area) and priced at HK$12. It was mainly published with double cover, sometimes with triple cover (e.g. issues 965, 974), issues 975 and 1000 are with quadruple cover, and, rarely, with single cover (e.g., issue 971, 983, 984). Every issue is sold with an idol product as a gift (e.g. issue 953 and 966 are sold with an idol A4 folder). It ceased publication on 25 July 2014 (issue 1219).
