= Emily Wong (singer) =

Chinese Cantopop singer and actress (born 1990)

- Born: 10 May 1990 (age 35); Hangzhou, Hangzhou, China
- Origin: Hangzhou, China
- Genres: Cantopop
- Occupation(s): Singer, actress
- Years active: 2006–present
- Labels: A Music
- Website: www.amusic.com.hk

Emily Wong (Chinese: 王歌慧; born 10 May 1990) is a Chinese Cantopop singer and actress signed to Amusic.

In 2006, Wong made her debut in the Hong Kong musical film A Melody Looking, directed by Leon Lai. Her first song, "I hear of..." (聽說), was featured in the film. She also sang "I'll Never Fall in Love Again" with Lai, Chapman To, Janice Vidal, Jill Vidal, and Charles Ying. Her first public appearance was on A Johnnie Walker Music Show.

On 2 July 2007, she released her first Cantonese single, "Liar" (大話精), through Amusic.

== Filmography ==
Television
Year	English title	Chinese title	Role	Notes
2014–2015	The Election	選戰	Anchor	
2014–2015	To Be or Not to Be	來生不做香港人	Lennon Ching	
2015	Second Life	第二人生	Angel	
2015	Karma	驚異世紀		
2017	Married but Available	我瞞結婚了	Shirley (畢莎莉)	
2017	My Dearly Sinful Mind	心理追兇	Hana	
2018	Stealing Seconds	棟仁的時光	Viola	

Film
Year	English title	Chinese title	Role	Notes
2006	A Melody Looking	缘邀之音	Emily	

== Discography ==
=== Singles ===
Year	Single Title	Label
2007	Liar	Amusic
