= A Melody Looking =

2008 Hong Kong musical film by Leon Lai

- Directed by: Leon Lai
- Written by: Leon Lai; Maggie To; Leung Tin Yin; Eric Lau
- Produced by: Joseph Chan; Michael Wehrhahn
- Starring: Leon Lai; Chapman To; Janice Vidal; Charles Ying; Jill Vidal; Emily Wong
- Music by: Mark Lui
- Release date: 18 November 2008
- Running time: 78 minutes
- Country: Hong Kong
- Languages: Cantonese; English

A Melody Looking is a Hong Kong musical film written and directed by Leon Lai, released on 18 November 2006.

== Synopsis ==
Sixteen-year-old Jill is a girl searching for her sister Janice, who reportedly possesses the perfect voice. She seeks assistance from a detective named Leon. During their search, Leon and his assistant Charles mix up the twin sisters, leading to a series of unexpected twists.

== Cast ==
- Leon Lai as Leon
- Chapman To as Chapman
- Janice Vidal as Janice
- Charles Ying as Charles
- Jill Vidal as Jill
- Emily Wong as Emily

== Background ==
The film, which cost about HK$ 10 million to produce, was shot entirely in New York City and marks the directorial debut of singer Leon Lai. It marks Leon debut as a director.

== See also ==
- Cinema of Hong Kong
