= ATV Miss Asia Pageant 2011 =

- Date: 19 January 2012
- Presenters: Kenneth Chan, Gilbert Lam, Jin Ling
- Entertainment: Eric Suen, Charles Ying, Alisa Teng
- Venue: Hainan Province Theatre, Haikou, Hainan, China
- Broadcaster: ATV
- Entrants: 20
- Placements: 12
- Winner: Michelle Feng; Beijing, China
- Congeniality: Vasinee Veeraphong; Thailand

ATV Miss Asia Pageant 2011, was the 23rd Miss Asia Pageant, which began on 19 January 2012. The pageant slogan was "Beauties, Gathered in the Water." For the first time, the organizers created a separate event for all contestants of Chinese descent from mainland China, Hong Kong, Canada, the US, and Brazil into a semi-final, the results of whom competed with ten contestants of other Asian races. Michelle Feng of Beijing, China, was the winner.

== Background ==
The pageant was originally scheduled for fall 2011, but was delayed until early 2012 by the organizers. As in previous years, there was no upper age limit for the contestants. For the first time, the organizers created a separate event for all contestants of Chinese descent who represented different nations, ATV Miss Asia Pageant Greater China Finals 2011. It narrowed down the original 20 contestants to ten from China, Hong Kong, Canada, the US, and Brazil for another set of finals to compete with ten contestants of other Asian races.

== Results ==
Placement	Contestant	Region Represented
ATV Miss Asia 2011	Michelle Feng	China (Beijing)
1st Runner-up	Koey Wong	Hong Kong
2nd Runner-up	Yi Joo Hong	Korea
3rd Runner-up	Crystal Yang	China (Sichuan)
Other semi-finalists	Monica Lin; Shelly Inoue; Shuang Zhou; Jolene Berube; Mico Chang; Daria Pechurina; Arlene Liang; Tiffany Feng	Taiwan; Japan; China (Hainan); Canada (Toronto); Taiwan; Russia; USA (New York City); China (Sichuan)

=== Special awards (Finals) ===
- Miss Friendship: Vasinee Veeraphong (Thailand)
- Miss Photogenic: Yi Joo Hong (Korea)
- Gorgeous Award: Shuang Zhou (Hainan, China)
- Perfect Figure Award: Michelle Feng (Beijing, China)
- Fascinating Leggy Award: Shelly Inoue (Japan)

=== Special awards (Greater China Finals) ===
- Greater China Miss Photogenic: Jolene Berube (Toronto, Canada)
- Greater China Miss Cosmopolitan: Monica Lin (Taiwan)
- Greater China Miss Goodwill: Samansa Hu (Brazil)

== List of contestants ==
No.	Contestant Name (English)	Contestant Name (Chinese)	Region Represented	Age
1	Yi Joo HONG	洪利朱	Korea	30
2	Monica Chien An LIN	林汧安	Taiwan	27
3	Shelly INOUE	井上雪莉	Japan	18
4	Judy LIM	林茱迪	Cambodia	18
5	Shuang ZHOU	周爽	China (Hainan)	21
6	Jolene Dong Yu BERUBE	裘琳	Canada (Toronto)	18
7	Amelia Huann Ran LIEW	劉煥妍	Malaysia	27
8	Mico Wai Chun CHANG	張瑋純	Taiwan	27
9	Nataliia BASENKO	娜塔莉婭‧巴新高	Kazakhstan	19
10	Jodi LEE	李思婷	Singapore	27
11	Maggie Yi Di CHEN	陳一荻	China (Jilin)	19
12	Elizabeth NGUYEN	阮艾娟	Vietnam	22
13	Daria PECHURINA	達雲娜‧皮察雲娜	Russia	19
14	Samansa HU	胡主莉	Brazil	29
15	Arlene LIANG	梁樂思	USA (New York City)	23
16	Vasinee VEERAPHONG	陳思恩	Thailand	25
17	Tiffany Yu Xuan FENG	馮虞軒	China (Sichuan)	23
18	Koey Ka Man WONG	王家敏	Hong Kong	27
19	Michelle Xue Bing FENG	馮雪冰	China (Beijing)	24
20	Crystal Xin Ting YANG	楊鑫婷	China (Sichuan)	22
