= Aarif Rahman =

Hong Kong actor, singer, and songwriter

- Born: Aarif Rahman; 26 February 1987 (age 39); British Hong Kong
- Education: Imperial College London (Bachelor of Science in Physics); King George V School
- Occupations: Actor; singer; songwriter
- Years active: 2009–present
- Height: 1.75 m (5 ft 9 in)
- Awards: Hong Kong Film Awards – Best New Performer; 2010 Echoes of the Rainbow – Desmond Law Best Original Song; 2010 Echoes of the Rainbow
- Musical career
- Also known as: Aarif Lee; Lee Chi-ting
- Genres: Mandopop; Cantopop
- Instruments: Vocals; guitar; bass guitar; drums
- Labels: Echelon Talent Management, Inc.

Chinese name
- Chinese: 李治廷
Transcriptions
Standard Mandarin
- Hanyu Pinyin: Lǐ Zhìtíng
Yue: Cantonese
- Jyutping: Lei5 Zi6-ting4

Aarif Rahman (Chinese: 李治廷; pinyin: Lǐ Zhìtíng; Jyutping: lei5 zi6 ting4, born 26 February 1987), also known as Aarif Lee Zhi-ting, is a Hong Kong actor, singer and songwriter.

== Early life ==
Born in Hong Kong, Aarif Rahman is of mixed Arab, Malay and Chinese descent. He grew up in Hong Kong and attended King George V School, where he discovered his penchant for music and started playing drums, guitar and the piano, as well as dabbling in song-writing.

After graduating with a physics degree from the Imperial College London, Rahman signed with East Asia Record Production company.

Aarif is paternal first cousins to noted tech entrepreneurs, the Handley brothers - Shanghai based Geoffrey Handley, New Zealand based Derek Handley and NYC based Calum Handley.

== Career ==
Rahman first gained the interest of the Hong Kong music scene when he was exposed as the writer who penned all the lyrics in Janice Vidal's 2009 English album Morning. Following this, in 2009 he released his debut album Starting from Today, which won him the Best Newcomer award at the Metro Radio Music Awards.

Rahman then made his film debut in the movie Echoes of the Rainbow (2010), which won him the Hong Kong Film Award for Best New Performer and Hong Kong Film Directors' Guild for Best New Actor of the Year – Silver Award. The theme song which he sang also won the Hong Kong Film Award for Best Original Song. He then starred as Bruce Lee in the dramatic biopic film Bruce Lee, My Brother (2010) and as a ICAC principal investigator in the crime thriller Cold War (2012).

In 2013, Rahman starred in the Mainland romantic comedy One Night Surprise. The low-budget film unexpectedly became a commercial success, and received positive reviews. Rahman won the Best New Actor award at the 1st China International Film Festival London and Outstanding Performance award at the Chinese Film Media Awards for his performance. Rahman then starred in historical drama The Empress of China, where he played the role of Li Zhi. The 82-episode TV series was broadcast on Hunan Television from 21 December 2014 to 5 February 2015, and earned increased recognition for Rahman in the Mainland region. He won the Best Actor in the Ancient Drama category at the Huading Awards for his performance.

In 2016, Rahman starred alongside Korean actress Kim Ha-neul in the family film Making Family. He also featured in Guo Jingming's fantasy animated motion capture L.O.R.D: Legend of Ravaging Dynasties, and reprised his role in the sequel of Cold War.

In 2017, Rahman starred alongside Jackie Chan in the action comedy film Kung Fu Yoga. The same year, he starred in Tsui Hark's science fiction wuxia film The Thousand Faces of Dunjia.

In 2019, Rahman starred in the historical romance drama Princess Silver as the male lead.

In 2026, Rahman plays the character Tony Wang in the film Once Upon a Time in the Middle East.

== Filmography ==
=== Film ===
| Year | English title | Chinese title | Role | Notes/Ref. |
|---|---|---|---|---|
| 2010 | Echoes of the Rainbow | 歲月神偷 | Luo Jinyi | |
| 2010 | Frozen | 為你鍾情 | Cheung Wai-kit | |
| 2010 | Bruce Lee, My Brother | 李小龍我的兄弟 | Bruce Lee | |
| 2011 | I Love Hong Kong | 我爱HK开心万岁 | Wu Ming | |
| 2011 | The Allure of Tears | 傾城之淚 | You Le | |
| 2011 | Dear Enemy | 親密敵人 | Heng Lima | |
| 2012 | Cold War | 寒戰 | Billy K.B. Cheung | |
| 2013 | One Night Surprise | 一夜驚喜 | Tony | |
| 2014 | South of the Clouds | 北迴歸線 | Li Ming | |
| 2015 | Tales of Mystery | 怪談 | Zi Liang | |
| 2016 | Cold War 2 | 寒戰2 | Billy K.B. Cheung | |
| 2016 | L.O.R.D: Legend of Ravaging Dynasties | 爵跡 | Ni Hong | |
| 2016 | Making Family | 非常父子檔 | Zhou Liyan | |
| 2017 | Kung Fu Yoga | 功夫瑜伽 | Jones | |
| 2017 | The Thousand Faces of Dunjia | 奇門遁甲 | Dao Yizhang | |
| 2020 | Special Couple | 合法伴侣 | Gu Dabai | |
| 2026 | Once Upon a Time in the Middle East | 欢迎来龙餐馆 | Tony Wang | |

=== Television series ===
| Year | English title | Chinese title | Role | Notes/Ref. |
|---|---|---|---|---|
| 2014 | The Empress of China | 武媚娘傳奇 | Li Zhi | |
| 2018 | Swords of Legends 2 | 古劍奇譚二 | Xia Yize | |
| 2019 | Princess Silver | 白髮 | Zongzheng Wuyou | |
| 2020 | Two Sisters In the Chaos | 浮世雙嬌傳 | Xue Rong | |
| TBA | The Geek Is on the Run | 極客江湖 | Bo Xian | |
| TBA | Ivy Monsters | 藤科動物也兇猛 | Zhuo Peng | |

== Discography ==
=== Studio albums ===
| Release date | Title | Track listing | Label |
|---|---|---|---|
| 26 November 2009 | Starting from Today | Track listing: 1. 今天開始; 2. 獨行俠; 3. Fly Away; 4. 想我吧; 5. Best I'll Ever Be; 6. 不堪設想; 7. 光速; 8. Another Day; 9. 歲月輕狂; 10. Echoes of the Rainbow | Amusic |
| 5 February 2010 | Starting from Today 2nd Version | Track listing: 1. Best I'll Ever Be (英); 2. Echoes of the Rainbow (英); 3. Way back into love (feat. Janice Vidal) | Amusic |
| 16 August 2011 | Everything | Track listing: 1. 尼古拉; 2. You Are My Everything; 3. 鵝毛; 4. 誰能代替 (國); 5. 奇蹟等不到; 6. 一片痴; 7. Craziness; 8. 速度對比; 9. Still (英); 10. Just the Way You Are (英); 11. 不是不愛才分開 (國) | Amusic |
| 14 March 2014 | Aarif's Love | Track listing: 1. 飞 2. 不可思议; 3. 一夜惊喜 (feat. Fan Bingbing); 4. 以苦为乐; 5. 睡蔷薇; 6. Porcelain Princess’ Palace (陶瓷公主的宝殿) | Amusic |

=== Singles ===
| Year | English title | Chinese title | Album | Notes |
|---|---|---|---|---|
| 2010 | "Never Know" | 回家路上 | —N/a | with Janice Vidal |
| 2010 | "Growing Love For You" | 為你鍾情 | Frozen OST | with Janice Vidal |
| 2011 | "I love Hong Kong" | —N/a | I Love Hong Kong OST | with Mag Lam |
| 2012 | "Our Starting Line" | 我們的起跑線 | —N/a | |
| 2012 | "Happy Together" | —N/a | —N/a | with Angelababy |
| 2013 | "One Night Surprise" | 一夜驚喜 | One Night Surprise OST | with Fan Bingbing |
| 2014 | "Eagles Fly in September" | 九月鷹飛 | South of the Clouds OST | with Isabelle Huang |
| 2015 | "GODAGODA" | —N/a | —N/a | Theme song of Sisters Over Flowers |
| 2015 | "Fighting For Dreams" | 為夢而戰 | —N/a | Theme song of Yes！Coach |
| 2016 | "Gentlemanly" | 紳士作風 | —N/a | |
| 2017 | "Coming Home" | 回家路上 | —N/a | |
| 2017 | "Who is the Biggest" | 誰是老大 | The Thousand Faces of Dunjia OST | with Da Peng and Wu Bai |
| 2017 | "Director Xu Ke I Have A Problem" | 徐克導演我有問題 | The Thousand Faces of Dunjia OST | |
| 2019 | "Xiao Zhi" | 小至 | Princess Silver OST | with Yisa Yu |
| 2019 | "If Snow" | 若雪 | Princess Silver OST | |
| 2019 | "I Know You Know" | —N/a | My True Friend OST | |
| 2020 | "Won't You Be Mine" | N/A | N/A | |
| 2020 | "Loser"" | N/A | N/A | |
| 2021 | "One and Only" | N/A | N/A | |

== Awards ==
=== Music ===
| Year | Award | Category | Nominated work | Ref. |
|---|---|---|---|---|
| 2009 | Metro Radio Hits Awards | New Singer Award | Starting From Today | |
| 2009 | Metro Radio Hits Awards | Best Singer Songwriter Album Award | Starting From Today | |
| 2009 | Ultimate Song Chart Awards Presentation | Best Male Newcomer – Gold Award | Starting From Today | |
| 2010 | IFPI Music Sales Awards | Best Selling Male Newcomer | Starting From Today | |
| 2010 | 10th Chinese Music Media Awards | Best Cantopop Male Newcomer | Starting From Today | |
| 2010 | 29th Hong Kong Film Awards | Best Original Film Song | Sui Yue Qing Kuang | |
| 2010 | Metro Radio Mandarin Hits Music Awards Presentation | Most Popular Winning Song Award | Sui Yue Qing Kuang | |
| 2010 | Metro Radio Mandarin Hits Music Awards Presentation | Mandarin Hit Songs | Sui Yue Qing Kuang | |
| 2010 | 7th CNTV's Music King Hit Global Chinese Music Award | Film Golden Song Award | Sui Yue Qing Kuang | |
| 2011 | 8th CNTV's Music King Hit Global Chinese Music Award | All-Rounded Artist Award (Hong Kong/Taiwan) | —N/a | |
| 2011 | 8th CNTV's Music King Hit Global Chinese Music Award | Singer-Song Writer Award | —N/a | |
| 2011 | 8th CNTV's Music King Hit Global Chinese Music Award | Golden Song Award | "Ni Gu La" | |
| 2013 | 9th CNTV's Music King Hit Global Chinese Music Award | All-Rounded Artist Award | —N/a | |
| 2013 | 9th CNTV's Music King Hit Global Chinese Music Award | Singer-Song Writer Award | —N/a | |
| 2013 | 1st China International Film Festival London | Best Original Film Song | "One Night Surprise" | |
| 2013 | 9+2 Music Pioneer Awards | Most Popular Duet Song | "One Night Surprise" | |
| 2013 | 9+2 Music Pioneer Awards | Best Film Singer | —N/a | |
| 2014 | 2nd V Chart Awards | Best Collaboration | "One Night Surprise" | |
| 2014 | 2nd V Chart Awards | Top Social Singer | —N/a | |
| 2014 | Metro Radio Mandarin Hits Music Awards Presentation | Hit Singer-Songwriter Award | —N/a | |
| 2014 | Metro Radio Mandarin Hits Music Awards Presentation | Mandarin Hit Songs | "Shui Qi Wei" | |
| 2014 | 9+2 Music Pioneer Awards | Best Trendy Singer-Songwriter | —N/a | |
| 2014 | 9+2 Music Pioneer Awards | Best Global Premiere Song | "Bu Ke Si Yi" | |
| 2015 | V Chart Awards | Hot Trend Artist of the Year (Hong Kong/Taiwan) | —N/a | |
| 2015 | 19th China Music Awards | Best Singer-Songwriter | —N/a | |
| 2015 | 19th China Music Awards | Best Golden Song (Hong Kong/Taiwan) | "Fly" | |
| 2015 | KU Music Asian Music Awards | Most Popular Crossover Artist | —N/a | |

=== Film and television ===
| Year | Award | Category | Nominated work | Result/Ref. |
|---|---|---|---|---|
| 2010 | 29th Hong Kong Film Awards | Best New Performer | Echoes of the Rainbow | Won |
| 2010 | 29th Hong Kong Film Awards | Best Original Film Song (with: Lowell Lo (composer), Alex Law (lyricist)) | Echoes of the Rainbow | Won |
| 2010 | Hong Kong Film Directors' Guild Award | Best Newcomer – Silver Award | Echoes of the Rainbow | Won |
| 2010 | 31st Hundred Flowers Awards | Best Supporting Actor | Echoes of the Rainbow | Nominated |
| 2011 | 11th Chinese Film Media Awards | Best New Performer | Echoes of the Rainbow | Nominated |
| 2011 | 5th Asian Film Awards | Best Newcomer | Echoes of the Rainbow | Nominated |
| 2013 | 1st China International Film Festival London | Best New Actor | One Night Surprise | Won |
| 2014 | 14th Chinese Film Media Awards | Outstanding Performance | One Night Surprise | Won |
| 2015 | 17th Huading Awards | Best Actor – Ancient Drama | The Empress of China | Won |
