= Frozen (2010 Hong Kong film) =

2010 Hong Kong film by Derek Kwok

- Theatrical release poster
- Traditional Chinese: 為你鍾情
- Jyutping: Wai^{6} Nei^{5} Zung^{1} Cing^{4}
- Directed by: Derek Kwok
- Written by: Derek Kwok; Yim Ka-yee
- Produced by: Joe Chan
- Starring: Janice Man; Janice Vidal; Aarif Rahman
- Cinematography: O Sing-pui; Derek Wan
- Edited by: Matthew Hui
- Music by: Mark Lui; Clement Fung
- Production company: Paciwood Picture
- Distributed by: Media Asia
- Release date: 2 September 2010
- Running time: 100 minutes
- Country: Hong Kong
- Language: Cantonese

Frozen (Chinese: 為你鍾情) is a 2010 Hong Kong romance film written and directed by Derek Kwok. Starring Janice Man, Janice Vidal, and Aarif Rahman, the film revolves around a pair of high school lovers (Man and Rahman) who elope and have a daughter. The film themes on the late Hong Kong singer Leslie Cheung and includes several of his songs as soundtracks. The film was theatrically released in Hong Kong on 2 September 2010.

== Plot ==
The film tells the story of Gigi and Kit who meet in high school and fall in love against her father's wishes. They elope when Gigi discovers she is pregnant with their child. However, their lives change when Gigi gets into a car accident and gives birth to their daughter.

== Cast ==
- Janice Man as Gigi, Wing's mother and Kit's girlfriend who is comatose for 20 years following the accident on the day her daughter was born
- Janice Vidal as Wing, daughter of Gigi and Kit who is raised by her grandfather after her mother fell into a coma
- Aarif Rahman as Kit, boyfriend of Gigi and Wing's father who falls in love with Gigi and impregnates her with his child
  - Leon Lai makes a cameo appearance as the older version of Kit
- Wilfred Lau as Leslie
- Alfred Cheung as Yin, Wing's step-father
- Ti Lung as Gigi's father and a scientist
- Siu Yam-yam as Kit's mother

== Production ==
Director Derek Kwok set the film in the 1980s, inspired by the era in which he grew up. The opening scene featured Leslie Cheung's final concert Final Encounter and several of Cheung's songs were included in the film, including "For Your Heart Only", "Monica", and "Craziness", in order to "recreate the cassette-tape era". Aarif Rahman was cast in the film before winning the Hong Kong Film Award for Best New Performer for Echoes of the Rainbow (2010), and the film's investor, Leon Lai, made a cameo appearance.

== Release ==
The film had its premiere at Tsim Sha Tsui, Hong Kong, on 30 August 2010, and received a theatrical release on 2 September 2010. It was also screened at the 4th Chungmuro International Film Festival in the same month.

== Reception ==
Cecilia Wong of the Hong Kong Film Critics Society wrote that Frozen carries a "more distinctive significance" than other coming-of-age films because it "connects actors from the older, middle, and younger generations" and "engages not only with the contemporary era but also with the 1980s", serving more as "a reflection of director Derek Kwok's personal nostalgia than as an element that resonates with that generation of viewers". Ellis Yip of AV Magazine praised the cameo appearance of Leon Lai as "full of surprises", particularly his "energetic Michael Jackson-style dance performance" and his cover of "Monica" by Leslie Cheung, but criticized the film's excessive branding of Lai's appearance, arguing that Lai "did not deliver a particularly remarkable performance and was not a legendary actor who warranted such extravagant publicity".
