= Kelvin Kwan =

Hong Kong Cantopop singer (born 1983)

Kelvin Kwan Cho-yiu
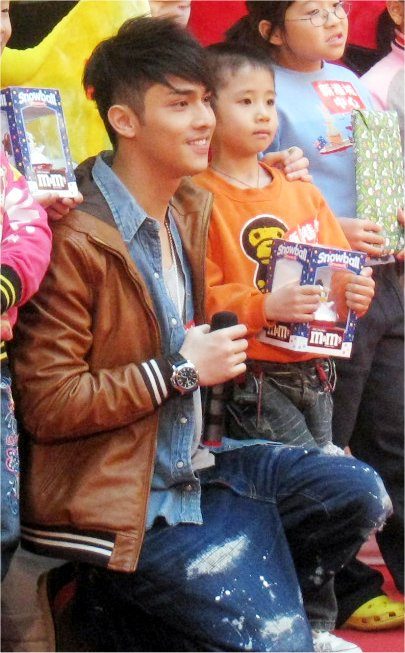
- Kwan in 2008
- Born: Kelvin Kwan; 24 March 1983 (age 43); Canada
- Occupation: Singer
- Years active: 2006–present

Chinese name
- Traditional Chinese: 關楚耀
- Simplified Chinese: 关楚耀
Transcriptions
Standard Mandarin
- Hanyu Pinyin: Guān Chǔyào
Yue: Cantonese
- Jyutping: Gwaan^{1} Co^{2} Jiu^{3}
- Musical career
- Origin: Hong Kong, China
- Genre: Cantopop
- Instrument: Singing
- Label: Go East

Kelvin Kwan Cho-yiu (born 24 March 1983) is a Canadian-born Hong Kong Cantopop singer signed to Go East, a subdivision of Universal Music.

== Family background ==
Born into a wealthy family, Kwan was raised in Canada. His father is Hong Kong record producer William Kwan, an executive for the Hong Kong division of PolyGram, who played in the band Teddy Robin and the Playboys with his brother Teddy Robin in his youth. Due to the elder Kwan's close relationship with Hong Kong singer Alan Tam, Tam became Kelvin Kwan's godfather. Kwan and Jill Vidal shot to stardom by filming anti-drug commercials in Hong Kong.

== Career ==
=== Music ===
In 2004, during the summer vacation after his first year of university in Toronto, Kwan went on a trip to Taiwan; after a night of karaoke with his father's ex-coworkers, Kwan was offered an audition, and was signed to Universal Music's Taiwan division. A year later, he moved to Hong Kong. Tam immediately took Kwan under his wing, teaching him how to face the media and deal with their queries about his personal life, which began to arise in July 2006 after he was seen attending a concert with fellow Universal Music singer Gia Lin. Tam's relationship with Kwan continued to be a boost to Kwan's career; in August 2006, the pair recorded a music video of the duet "Big Cry Baby (大喊包)", which secured Kwan's popularity in the Hong Kong music industry. However, Tam has not been reticent in pointing out Kwan's flaws and errors publicly; in an interview with the Sing Tao Daily in September 2006, he criticised Kwan's public speaking abilities and suggested he concentrate harder on singing during performances; Kwan reportedly felt awkward and hurt by Tam's words. Regardless, Kwan still credits a great deal of his success to Tam claiming that he would not be where he is today without his help and guidance.

Kwan's self-titled debut album was released on 11 October 2006. Among the songs on the album was Big Cry Baby, which only 5 days after the album's release was ranked as China's 4th most popular duet by China Central Television.

=== Community service ===
Kwan and Jill Vidal participated in a number of community service activities aimed at preventing drug use and shoplifting. They were the spokespersons for the "Say no to drugs" campaign (向毒品說不), a program aimed to prevent the younger generation to avoid drugs. In 2006 and 2008, Kwan and Jill Vidal took part in an "anti-drug promotion" (禁毒滅罪耀北區) in Hong Kong's north district.

=== Arrest ===
On 3 March 2009, Kelvin Kwan and his girlfriend Jill Vidal were arrested in Tokyo over alleged possession of marijuana during an investigation into shoplifting, despite both were aforementioned anti-drug ambassadors in 2008. The drugs were alleged to have been brought in from Hong Kong. Kwan's godfather, Alan Tam, expressed disappointment with Kwan. On 28 March, he was released and he returned to Hong Kong On 2 April, he delivered a prepared speech where he expressed his "regret and remorse".

"I hope the younger generation can learn from my mistakes and be law-abiding citizens, and most importantly, cherish their health, value their life and stay away from drugs."

Kwan announced he would temporarily set aside his entertainment career. Baptist University journalism professor To Yiu-ming remarked that Kwan's press conference was a leaf out of Edison Chen's playbook, and that both "failed to show their courage and sincerity" by refusing to answer public questions.

Kwan would not return to the entertainment industry until more than a year later when he released his next album, Here I Am on 22 September 2010.

== Discography ==
- 2006-10-11: 關楚耀 首張同名專輯 (Self-titled Debut)
- 2007-11-20: 你當我什麼 (What Do You Take Me For)
- 2008-10-22: Hello...My Name Is
- 2010-09-22: Here I Am

== Filmography ==
- The Stunt (2018) (TV series)
- With Prisoners (2017)
- Wong Ka Yan (2015)
- Paranormal Mind (2015) (TV series)
- One Night in Taipei (2015)
- ATM (2015)
- 12 Golden Ducks (2015)
- Once Upon a Song (2015) (TV series)
- Sifu vs Vampire (2014)
- Enthralled (2014)
- Doomsday Party (2013)
- Kick Ass Girls (2013)
- Hardcore Comedy (2013)
- Tales from the Dark 2 (2013)
- Lan Kwai Fong 2 (2012)
- Nobody's Perfect (2008)
- Forgive and Forget (2008)
- Magic Boy (2007)
