= Second Life (TV series) =

- Starring: Wilfred Lau; Terence Yin; Bondy Chiu; Ann Ho; Patrick Lui; Joey Tang; Nick Chong; Kwok Fung; Bonnie Wong; Maria Chen; Rocky Chan; Emily Wong
- Opening theme: "再任我唱" by Wilfred Lau, Joey Tang, Patrick Lui and Terence Yin
- Country of origin: Hong Kong
- Original language: Cantonese
- No. of episodes: 11

Production
- Production location: Hong Kong
- Camera setup: Multi-camera
- Running time: 41–45 minutes
- Production company: Hong Kong Television Network

Original release
- Release: February 23 – March 9, 2015

Second Life (Chinese: 第二人生), is a 2015 television series produced by Hong Kong Television Network. The first episode premiered on February 23, 2015.

== Cast ==
- Wilfred Lau as Cheung Yuk-jit
  - Chiu Sin-hang as young Cheung Yuk-jit
- Terence Yin as Owen Gin
- Bondy Chiu as Joyce Chu
  - Maggie Wong as young Joyce Chu
- Ann Ho as Yue Yue
  - Cherry Pau as young Yue Yue
- Patrick Lui as Ho Zin-hou
- Joey Tang as Leung Ka-bou
  - Ricksen Tam as young Leung Ka-bou
- Nick Chong as Brandon Cheung
- Kwok Fung as Cheung Kai-gam
- Bonnie Wong as Wong Lai-fan
- Maria Chen as Chan Sau-han
- Rocky Chan as Will Leung
- Emily Wong as Angel
- Anita Chan as Charlie Kwan
- Wong Ching as Chu Bak-gin
- Mannor Chan as Sam Mei-jan
- Lo Hoi-pang as Hung Fung
- Luvin Ho as reporter, episode 5

== Song list ==
- "伴妳一生" by Terence Yin
- "知錯" by Wilfred Lau
