= Wilfred Lau =

Hong Kong singer and actor

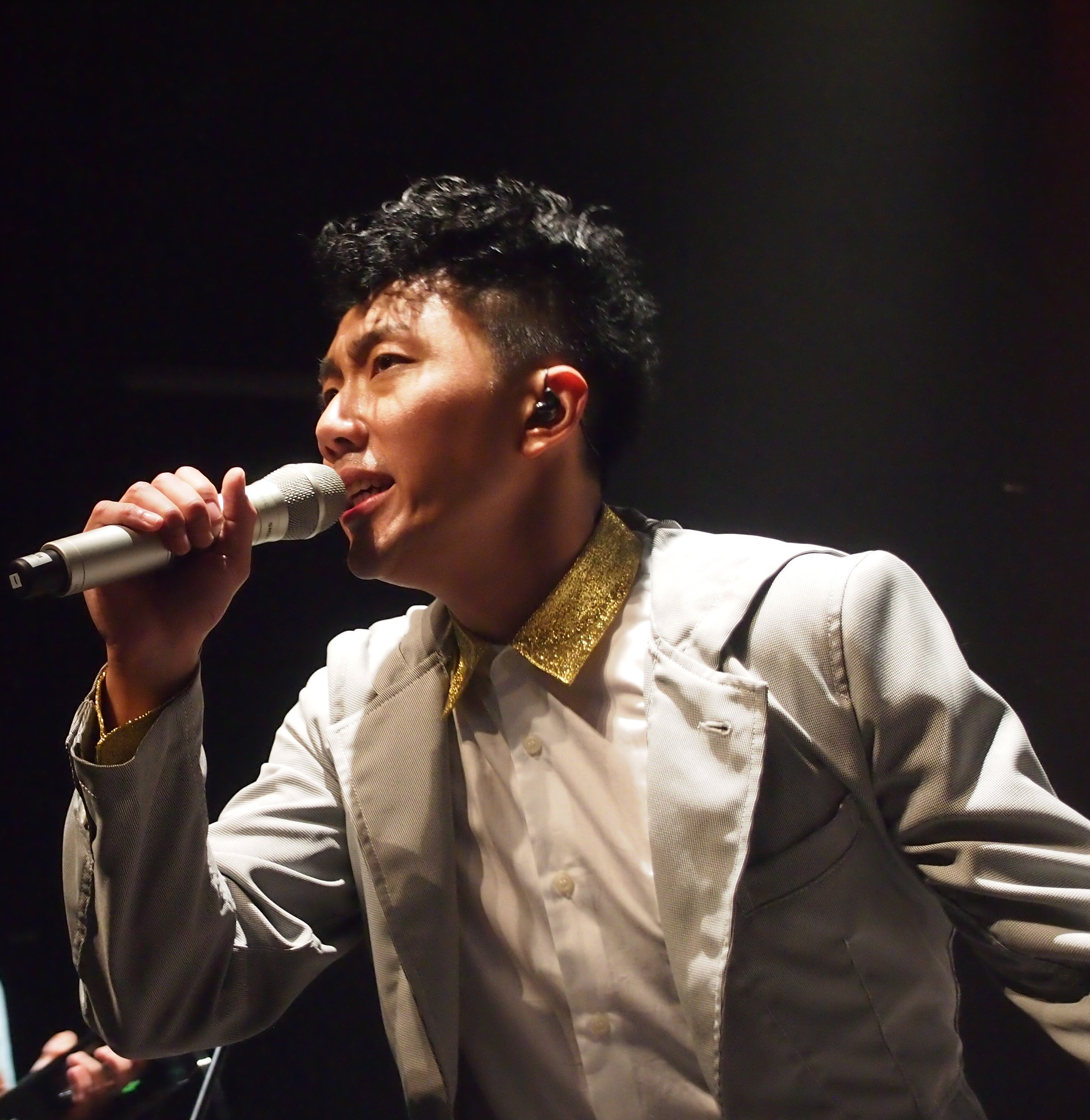
- Lau in 2012
- Born: Lau Ho-Lung (劉浩龍); 13 August 1976 (age 50); Hong Kong
- Occupations: Singer; actor
- Years active: 2004—present

Chinese name
- Traditional Chinese: 劉浩龍
- Simplified Chinese: 刘浩龙
Transcriptions
Standard Mandarin
- Hanyu Pinyin: liu2 hao4 long2
Yue: Cantonese
- Jyutping: lau4 hou5 lung4
- Musical career
- Also known as: C-Hing
- Origin: Hong Kong, China
- Genres: Cantopop, C-rock
- Instruments: Vocals, guitar, harmonica
- Labels: Go East Entertainment (2004–2006); Amusic (2007-present)

Wilfred Lau Ho-Lung is a Hong Kong singer and actor. He is also known as "師兄" (C-Hing, Senpai) in the entertainment industry because he was the winner of the 16th annual New Talent Singing Awards International Finals in 1997, despite not actually becoming a singer until 2004. Many have compared his voice to the voice of Eason Chan.

Wilfred attended St. Joseph's Primary School (聖若瑟小學), a boys' school for his primary education, which he was schoolmate of Priscilla Chan's younger brother. He graduated from Kiangsu-Chekiang College. As a child, he had always wanted to become a singer due to seeing Priscilla's awards while he visited her brother's home, but his teacher made him give up his dream. At age 21, after seeing the concerts of Anita Mui and Andy Hui, he finally had enough courage to enter the 1997 New Talent Singing Awards International Finals where he won first place (the Gold award), the Best Performance Award (最佳演繹大獎), and the Best Performance Art Potential Award (最具演藝潛質獎).

== Career ==
As the winner, Wilfred was signed to Capital Artists. His first job in Capital Artists was to appear as a guest in TVB's version of Edmond Leung's music video for the song 好朋友 (Good Friend). In the following 4 years, he hosted television shows on TVB. The company did not arrange Wilfred to record albums or songs.

In 2001, Capital Artists withdrew its business in Hong Kong. Wilfred searched for other record companies but most of them turned him down. With the help from Eddie Ng who gave him the song "舊人" to save him time from finding and recording a demo, and after three years of searching, Go East Entertainment Co. Ltd, a subsidiary of Universal Music Group, signed him and arranged for him to record his debut album Start Up, which was released in 2004. His contract with Go East ended in October 2006. He is now signed to East Asia Music.

== Personal life ==
Joey Yung and Lau publicly announced their relationship in 2012. On April 28, they announced that they broke up and will continue being friends, supporting each other.

== Discography ==
- Start Up (2004)
- Singing in the Ring (2004)
- Past & Present (CD+VCD) (2005)
- All The Best 新歌+精選 (CD+VCD) (2006)
- All The Best 新歌+精選 (CD+Live Karaoke DVD) (2006)
- Le Nouvel Album (EP) (2008)

Other Compilations

- Love 06 (2006)
- Perfect Match (2005)
- 細聽... 細說 (2006)

=== Select songs ===
- 記得
- 思覺失調
- 緋聞男友
- 跳水
- 恢復自由
- 錯定離手
- 94340634
- 二等天使
- 斷尾
- 戰友

== Performances ==
- Special guest of the New Talent Singing Awards Vancouver Audition (2005).
- Guest starred in Eason Chan's Wrestling with God (人神鬥) musical (19 August 2005).

== Concerts ==
- 2005 - Wilfred Lau 903 Hit 4 On Fire 0813 Concert (劉浩龍 加州紅903熱火樂團音樂會).
- J.A.W.S. (Justin Lo, Alex Fong, Wilfred Lau, Stephy Tang) at the Sydney Entertainment Centre and Melbourne Arts Centre on the 19th and 21st, respectively, of May 2006.

== Achievements ==
- 1997 New Talent Singing Awards International Finals - Gold Award, Best Performance Award, Best Performance Art Potential Award
- Golden Hit for New Star TVB Jade Solid Gold Award
- Metro Radio Hits for the Princes and Princesses Best Newcomers Category (2004).

== Filmography ==
- Moments of Love (2005)
- Lady Cop & Papa Crook (大搜查之女) (2008)
- The Sniper (2009)
- Split Second Murders (2009)
- Fire of Conscience (火龍) (2010)
- Once a Gangster (飛砂風中轉) (2010)
- Frozen (2010)
- Merry-Go-Round (2010)
- Bruce Lee, My Brother (2010)
- Overheard 2 (2011)
- Romancing in Thin Air (2012)
- All's Well, Ends Well 2012 (2012)
- Motorway (2012)
- Diva (2012)
- Doomsday Party (2013)
- Overheard 3 (2014)
- 12 Golden Ducks (2015)
- Second Life (2015) (TV series)
- Full Strike (2015)
- Guia in Love (2015)
- Nessun Dorma (2016)
- Chasing the Dragon (2017)
- Keep Calm and Be a Superstar (2018)
- The Leaker (2018)
- The Cursed (2018)
- A Home with a View (2019)
- Shock Wave 2 (2020)
- G Storm (2021)
- The Heir to the Throne (2024)
