= Bullets of Love =

2001 Hong Kong film by Andrew Lau

- DVD cover
- Traditional Chinese: 不死情謎
- Simplified Chinese: 不死情谜
- Hanyu Pinyin: Bù Sǐ Qíng Mí
- Jyutping: Bat1 Sei2 Cing6 Mai6
- Directed by: Andrew Lau
- Screenplay by: Thirteen Chan
- Produced by: Andrew Lau; Takashige Ichise
- Starring: Leon Lai; Asaka Seto
- Cinematography: Andrew Lau; Lai Yiu-fai
- Edited by: Danny Pang Phat
- Music by: Chan Kwong-wing
- Production companies: Film Power Company; OZ Co.
- Distributed by: Deltamac Films
- Release date: 27 September 2001
- Running time: 115 minutes
- Country: Hong Kong
- Languages: Cantonese; Japanese; English
- Budget: HK$25 million
- Box office: HK$3,587,266

Bullets of Love is a 2001 Hong Kong action thriller film produced and directed by Andrew Lau and starring Leon Lai and Asaka Seto.

== Plot ==
Hong Kong Regional Crime Unit inspector Sam Lam (Leon Lai) rapidly raids a transnational criminal organisation and capturing its leader, Night (Terence Yin). Although his crimes were heinous, Night spends a huge sum a team of clever lawyers to defend him, causing the efforts Sam's fiancé, Ann (Asaka Seto), who is the prosecutor of the case, coming to no avail. Eventually, Night received a light sentence of five years imprisonment. Holding a grudge against Sam and Ann for putting him in prison, Night schemes with his older brother, Day (Richard Sun), to orchestrate a plan for revenge.

After the conclusion of the case, Ann and Sam takes a vacation to Paris. Unexpected to them, Day sends a killer who shoots and kills Ann, who was riding an elevator, but does not kill Sam. Ann's death causes Sam to grieve abnormally. Sam decides to quit his job in the police force and opens a bar in Tai O, leading a reclusive life.

Two years later, Sam meets You (Asaka Seto), a Japanese tourist who looks exactly like Ann. Sam cannot help but fall in love with her. One day, Sam accidentally discovers a secret about You, while on the other hand, Night, who won an appeal on his case, was released early and is determined to get back at Sam.

== Cast ==
- Leon Lai as Inspector Sam Lam
- Asaka Seto as Ann / You
  - Sandy Lam as the voice of Ann
- Terence Yin as Night / Wong Po
- Michael Chan as Uncle Ox
- Frankie Ng as Uncle Tiger
- Hayawaka Saki as The Assassin
- Richard Sun as Day / Wong Fung
- Ronald Cheng as Ma
- Alexander Chan as Ho Ma
- Tony Ho as Band Member
- Yu Ka-ho as Band Member
- Benjamin Yuen as Band Member
- Alan Ko
- Michael Tse as Cop shot in the street
- Poon Hang-sang
- Gary Mak
- Ankee Leung
- Danny Chan
- Ho Ka-fai as Policeman
- Law Shu-kei as Judge
- Prudence Kao as Jojo
- Chow Mei-shing as Mao
- Ben Yuen as Night's lawyer
- Vincent Chik
- Luk Oi-ling
- Pauline Yeung

== Reception ==
=== Critical response ===
Earl Cresssey of DVD Talk rated the film a score of 3.5 out of 5 stars and praises the developed characters, action sequences and suspenseful storyline, while also noting a few logic problems. LoveHKFilm gave the film a mixed review criticizing its emotional hooks and Leon Lai's performances, but praising the performances of Asaka Seto and the supporting cast.

=== Box office ===
The film grossed HK$3,587,266 at the Hong Kong box office during its theatrical run from 27 September to 17 October 2001.
