= Madame Tussauds Hong Kong =

Wax museum

Coordinates: 22°16′17.49″N 114°8′59.45″E

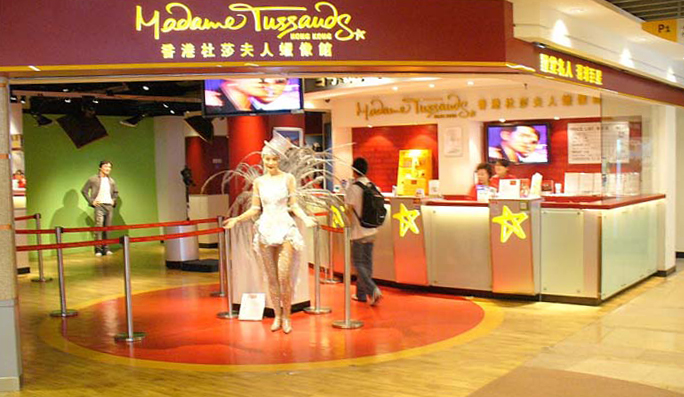
- The entrance to Madame Tussauds Hong Kong
- Traditional Chinese: 香港杜莎夫人蠟像館
- Simplified Chinese: 香港杜莎夫人蜡像馆
Transcriptions
Standard Mandarin
- Hanyu Pinyin: Xiānggǎng Dùshā Fūrén Làxiàngguǎn
Yue: Cantonese
- Yale Romanization: Hēung góng douh sāa fū yàhn laahp jeuhng gún
- Jyutping: Hoeng1 gong2 dou6 saa1 fu1 jan4 laap6 zoeng6 gun2

Madame Tussauds Hong Kong is a wax museum situated in the Peak Tower on Hong Kong Island. It opened in 2000 and was the first branch of the Madame Tussauds museum to be established in Asia. The museum features approximately 100 wax figures, including a substantial number representing Asian personalities, with sixteen figures originating from Hong Kong. The exhibits are arranged into themed zones, such as Hong Kong Glamour, Music Icons, Historical and National Heroes, The Champions, and World Premiere.

== History ==
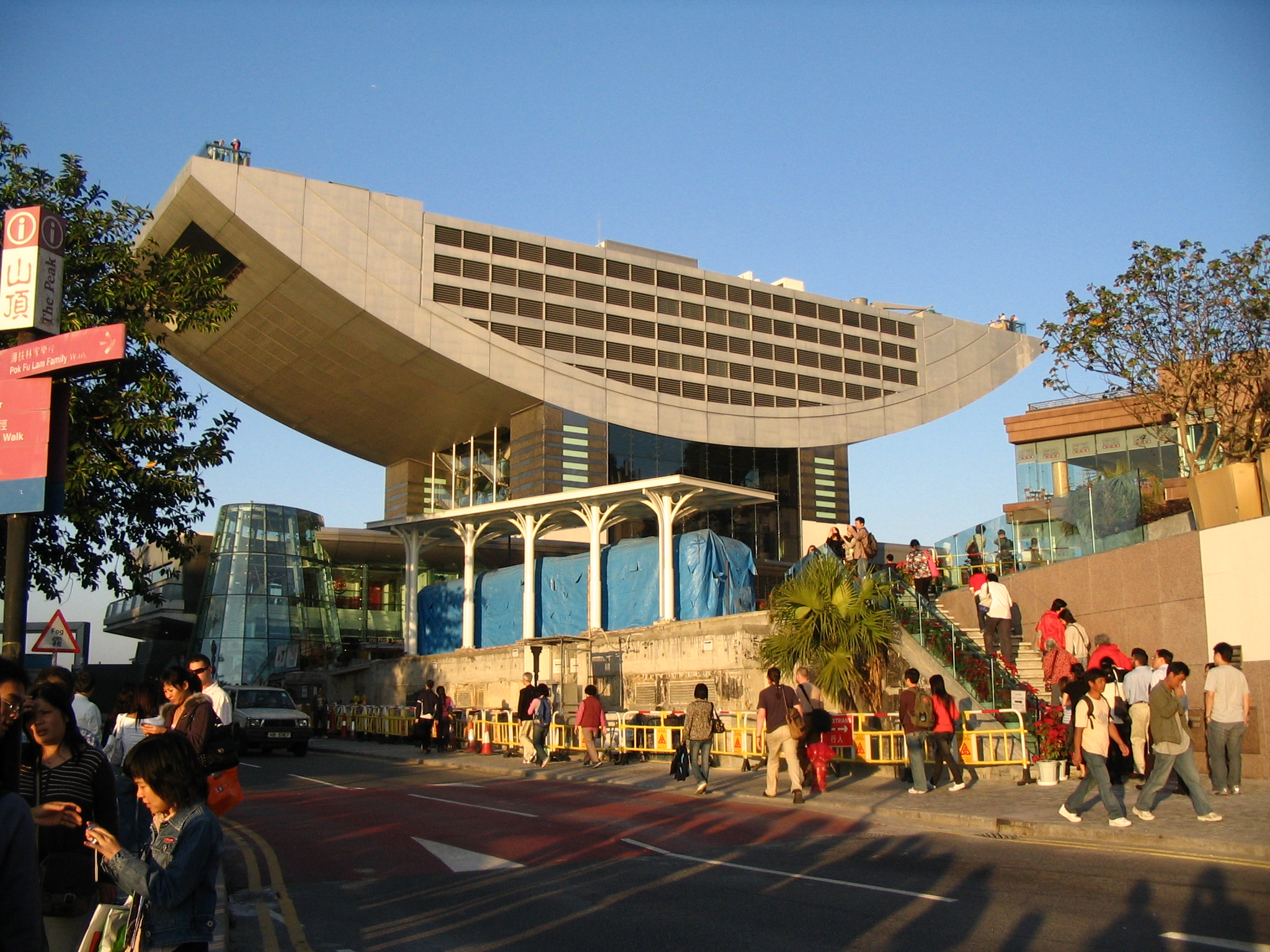
The Peak Tower at Victoria Peak, Hong Kong.

In the late 1990s, Madame Tussauds operated museums in several major cities, including London, Amsterdam and Las Vegas. However, the Asia–Pacific region remained unrepresented. In response, the Tussauds Group launched a touring exhibition titled Madame Tussaud's Touring Attraction, which visited Singapore and Australia and received a positive public response. Encouraged by the reception, the Group selected Hong Kong as the location for its first permanent venue in Asia, citing its strategic proximity to regional markets.

Madame Tussauds Hong Kong opened in 2000 at The Peak, with a large collection of wax figures representing notable individuals from around the world, as well as prominent Hong Kong celebrities. More than one-third of the exhibits portray Asian personalities. The museum has regularly hosted figure unveiling ceremonies, often attended by the celebrities themselves and their fans. In 2005, the venue underwent a significant renovation costing 20 million Hong Kong dollars (US$2.6 million). The facility reopened on 18 May 2006, with the renovation having the exhibition area by 700 square metres (7,500 sq ft) across three floors and introduced five themed zones. These include Hong Kong Glamour, Music Icons, Historical and National Heroes, The Champions, and World Premiere, where visitors can interact with figures in immersive settings.

As of 2008, the museum is managed by Bret Pidgeon, who also oversees the Shanghai branch. Pidgeon previously served at Madame Tussauds New York for eight years. The Hong Kong location is accessible by minibus, taxi, or the Peak Tram from Central. It operates daily from 10:30 AM to 9:30 PM.

== Wax figure making process ==
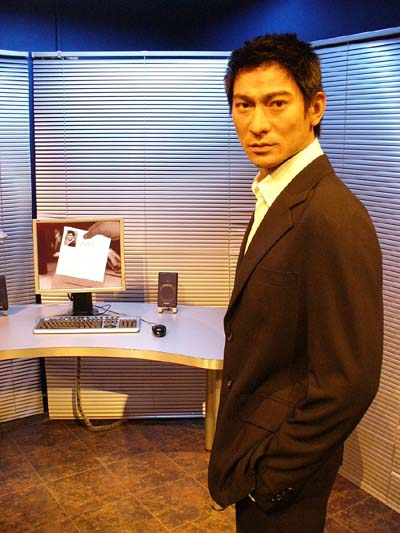
The wax likeness of singer and movie star Andy Lau

Creating a wax figure involves multiple sittings with the celebrity, during which a sculptor from Madame Tussauds Studios records details such as hair and eye colour and takes over 500 body measurements. The primary objective is to capture the subject's likeness and personality accurately. A clay model is initially sculpted and used to create a mould. Wax casts of the head and hands are produced, into which hand-painted acrylic eyes are inserted. Real human hair is applied strand by strand for realism.

The figure is then coloured using a mixture of oil, water, and acrylic. The body is cast in fibreglass, to which the wax head and hands are attached. Clothing is often donated by the celebrity, and the pose, facial expression, and styling aim to ensure maximum authenticity. Each figure takes approximately six months to complete and involves a team of around 20 artists. The cost per figure is estimated at HK$1 million.

== Unique figures ==
Several figures at Madame Tussauds Hong Kong are notable for their innovation or cultural significance:

- The figure of Miriam Yeung (unveiled November 2006) – the first wax figure globally to feature built-in sensors that allow it to giggle, reflecting Yeung's well-known lively personality.
- The figure of Connie Chan (unveiled August 2006) – the first figure dressed in full traditional Chinese regalia. The costume was inspired by her role in the musical Only You, set in the Yuan Dynasty.
- The figure of Bae Yong-joon (unveiled May 2006) – the first Korean celebrity to be represented in a Madame Tussauds museum.
- The figure of Andy Lau (unveiled April 2005) – the museum's first animatronic figure, made from silicone rather than wax. Lau's model features a heartbeat mechanism inspired by a similar animatronic installed for Brad Pitt in the Madame Tussauds Amsterdam.

== Featured personalities ==
The list of featured celebrities sorted according to on-site themes are:

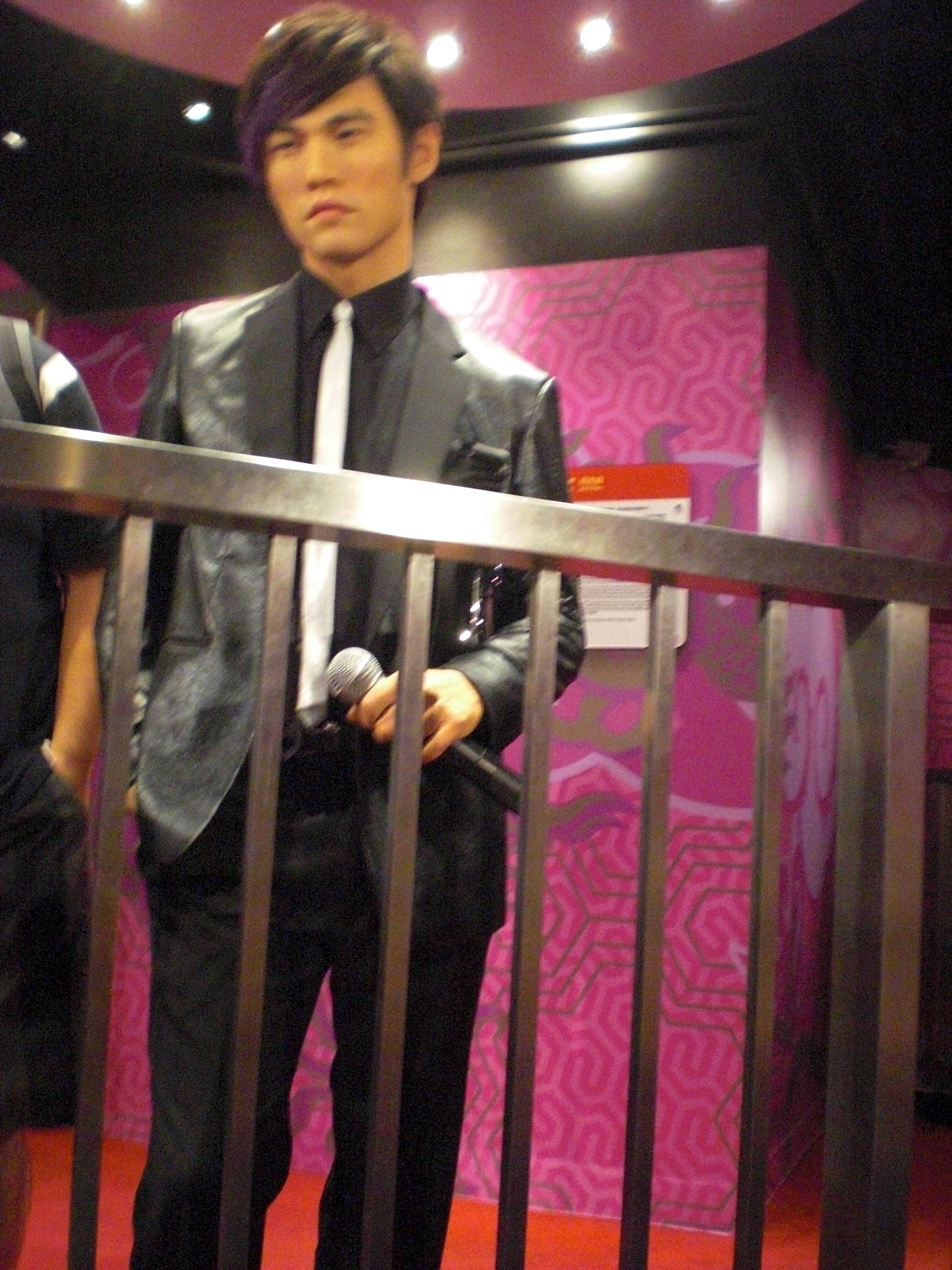
Jay Chou (周杰倫)

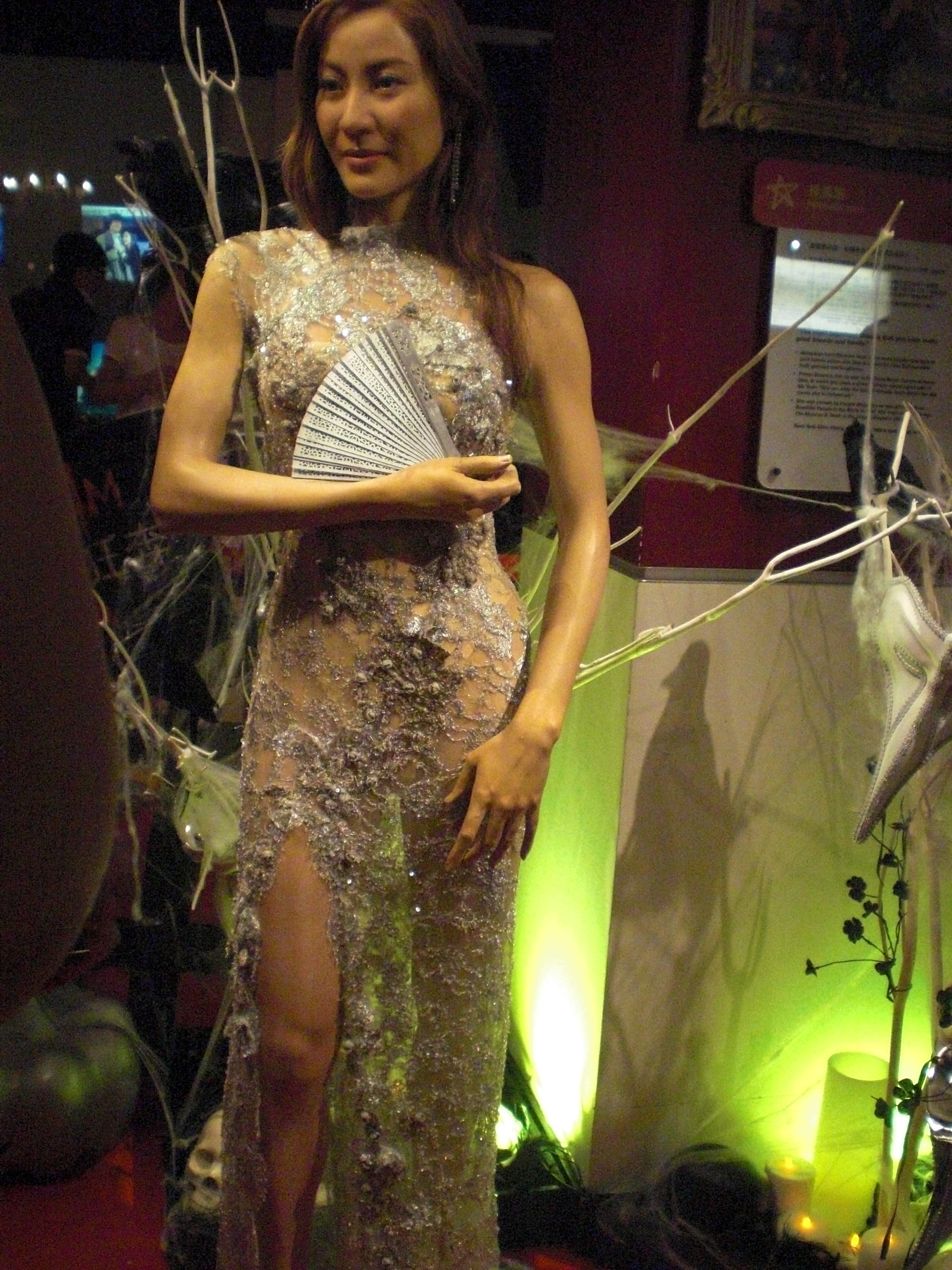
Michelle Yeoh (楊紫瓊)

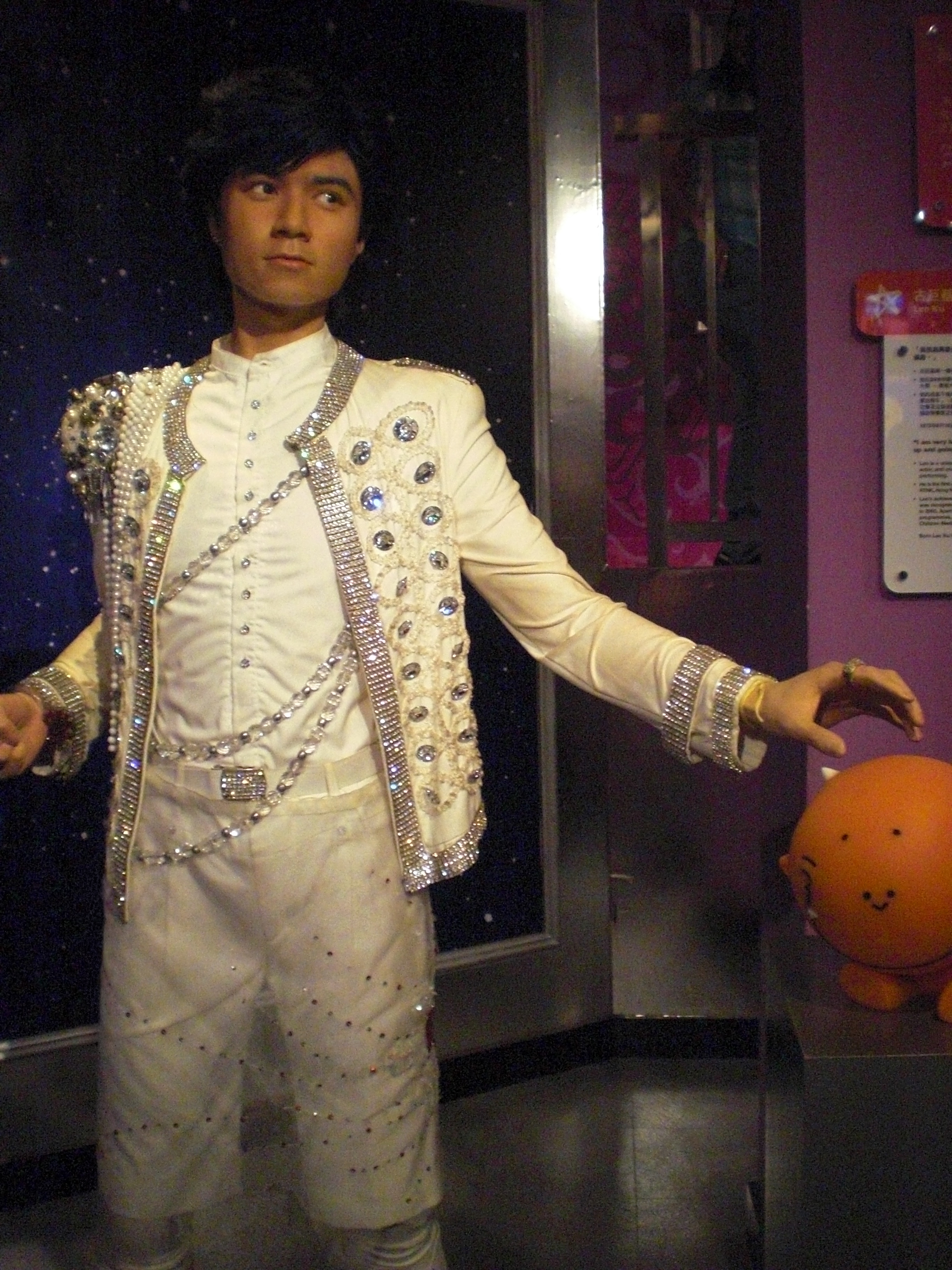
Leo Ku (古巨基)

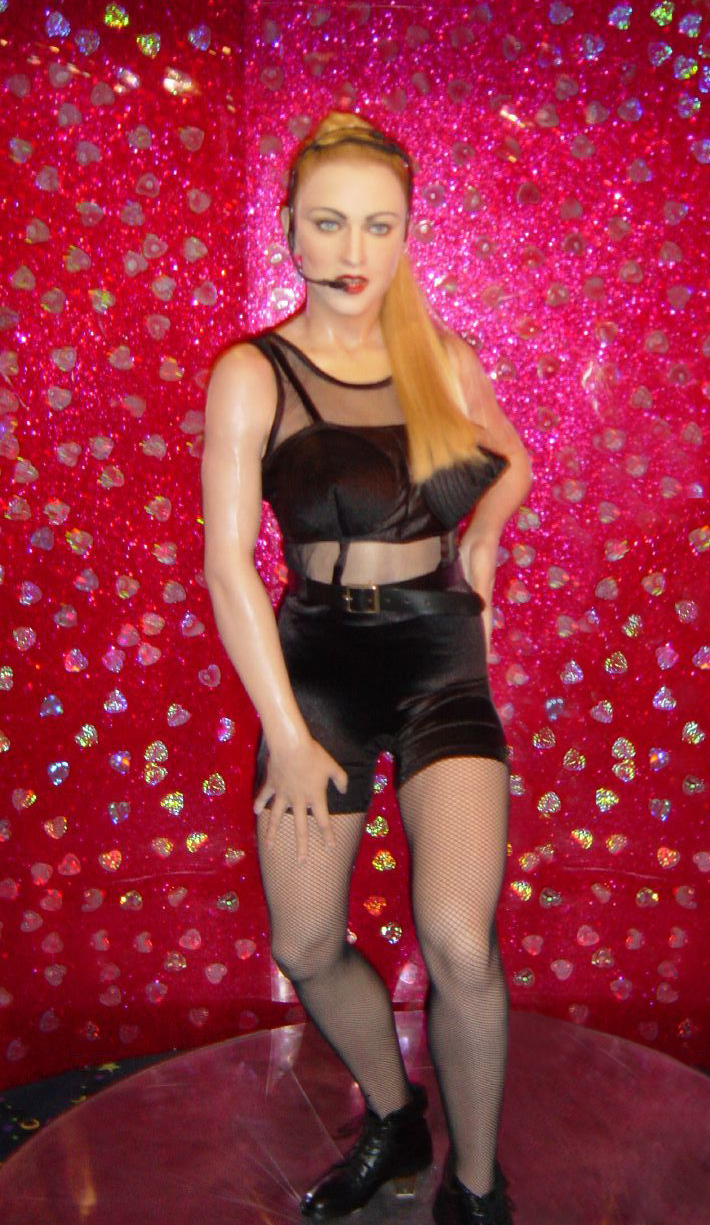
Madonna

=== Hong Kong Glamour ===
1. Jackie Chan
2. Jay Chou
3. Bruce Lee
4. Michelle Yeoh
5. Ayumi Hamasaki
6. Brad Pitt
7. Cher
8. Eddie Murphy
9. Elle Macpherson
10. Gérard Depardieu
11. Hugh Grant
12. Joanna Lumley
13. Kelly Chen
14. Mel Gibson
15. Meryl Streep
16. Naomi Campbell
17. Cecilia Cheung
18. Aaron Kwok
19. Angelababy
20. Johnny Depp
21. Carina Lau
22. Li Bingbing
23. Kendall Jenner
24. Hu Ge
25. Leo Wu
26. Huang Xiaoming
27. Leo Ku (added on 4 April 2007)
28. Janice Vidal (added on 18 July 2007)
29. Angelina Jolie (added on 27 Sep 2007)
30. Donnie Yen (added on 30 April 2010)
31. Jet Li (added on 28 Sep 2010)
32. Louis Koo (added on 28 January 2011)
33. Kim Woo-bin (added on 22 Sep 2018)
34. Pia Wurtzbach (the first Filipino wax figure to join the list on 25 March 2019)
35. Jackson Wang (added on 29 July 2019)
36. Zhu Yilong (added on 20 September 2021)
37. Cate Blanchett (added on 10 August 2022)
38. Catriona Gray (the third Filipino celebrity wax figure added on 7 September 2023)
39. Chris Hemsworth (added on 23 October 2023)
40. Elon Musk (added on 25 April 2024)
41. Anne Curtis (the fourth Filipino celebrity wax figure added on 9 December 2024)

=== The Sports Champions ===
1. David Beckham
2. Lee Lai Shan
3. Muhammad Ali
4. Yao Ming
5. Chiyonofuji Mitsugu
6. Liu Xiang
7. Tiger Woods
8. Ronaldinho (added in December 2007)
9. Stephen Curry
10. Maria Sharapova
11. Wayne Rooney
12. Alexander Ovechkin
13. Li Na
14. Su Yiming
15. Lee Chong Wei
16. Sun Yang
17. Cristiano Ronaldo
18. Manny Pacquiao (the second Filipino celebrity wax figure added on 24 November 2021)

=== Historical figures and national heroes ===
1. Diana, Princess of Wales
2. Luciano Pavarotti
3. Mahatma Gandhi
4. Nelson Mandela
5. Bill Clinton
6. George W. Bush
7. Barack Obama (added on 20 January 2009)
8. Mikhail Gorbachev
9. Saddam Hussein
10. Yasser Arafat
11. Tony Blair
12. The Duke of Edinburgh
13. Elizabeth II
14. Charles III
15. Camilla
16. The Princess Royal
17. Prince of Wales (added on 7 Aug 2007)
18. Princess of Wales (added on 5 Oct 2013)
19. Adolf Hitler
20. Sir Winston Churchill
21. Julia Gillard
22. Yayoi Kusama (added on 19 October 2016)
23. Rembrandt van Rijn
24. Pablo Picasso
25. Wolfgang Amadeus Mozart
26. Deng Xiaoping
27. Jiang Zemin
28. Li Ka Shing
29. Lee Kuan Yew
30. Shigeru Yoshida
31. Hu Jintao
32. Albert Einstein
33. John Howard
34. Marie Tussaud
35. Sun Yat-sen (added in July 2007)
36. Mao Zedong (added in July 2007)
37. Yang Liwei (added in July 2007)
38. Donald Tsang (added on 7 April 2008)
39. Narendra Modi
40. Sukarno (became the second statue of Sukarno, the first statue of Sukarno was in Madame Tussauds Bangkok, added on 5 June 2014)
41. Joko Widodo (added on 1 May 2017)
42. William Shakespeare
43. Donald Trump (added on 26 April 2018)
44. Leonardo da Vinci
45. Steve Jobs
46. Bill Gates
47. Xi Jinping (added on 16 September 2017)
48. Peng Liyuan (added on 16 September 2017)

=== World Premiere ===
1. Elizabeth Taylor
2. Benny Hill
3. Pierce Brosnan
4. Andy Lau
5. Leon Lai
6. Anthony Hopkins
7. Jodie Foster
8. Harrison Ford
9. Hyun Bin
10. Charlie Chaplin
11. Humphrey Bogart
12. Macaulay Culkin
13. Marilyn Monroe
14. Alfred Hitchcock
15. Kim Hyun-joong
16. Bae Yong-joon
17. Connie Chan
18. Kim Soo-hyun
19. Amitabh Bachchan
20. Bruce Lee
21. Lee Jong-suk
22. Suzy
23. Leon Lai Yi
24. Mark Chao
25. Benedict Cumberbatch
26. Emma Watson
27. Robert Pattinson
28. James Dean
29. Audrey Hepburn
30. Nicole Kidman
31. Liam Hemsworth
32. Yim Si Wan
33. Jennifer Aniston
34. Varun Dhawan
35. Kareena Kapoor Khan
36. Joe Chen
37. Salman Khan
38. Katrina Kaif

=== Musicians ===
1. Lee Min-ho
2. Leslie Cheung
3. Anita Mui
4. Elvis Presley
5. Freddie Mercury
6. Lady Gaga
7. Madonna
8. Michael Jackson
9. Harry Styles
10. Rihanna
11. Kylie Minogue
12. Cai Xukun
13. Lang Lang
14. Mick Jagger
15. Miriam Yeung
16. Teresa Teng
17. The Beatles
18. Siwon Choi
19. Zhang Yixing
20. Nichkhun Horvejkul
21. Tina Turner
22. Wong Ka Kui
23. Twins
24. Joey Yung
25. William Chan
26. Z.Tao
27. Jam Hsiao
28. Jackson Yee
29. G.E.M.
30. TVXQ
31. Taylor Swift
32. Ariana Grande
33. Shawn Mendes
34. Justin Bieber
35. Ed Sheeran
36. Hua Chenyu
37. Agnez Mo
38. Jacky Cheung

== Madame Tussauds Shanghai ==
Madame Tussauds' second Asian location was established in Shanghai following the city's growing status as a cultural and tourist hub in East Asia. In early 2004, the Tussauds Group entered discussions with local authorities, resulting in an agreement to open a new museum. Madame Tussauds Shanghai (Chinese: 上海杜莎夫人臘像館) opened on 1 May 2006 on the 10th floor of the New World Department Store on West Nanjing Road.

The Shanghai venue currently features approximately 75 wax figures of both Chinese and international celebrities, with additional expansion phases planned. The museum is divided into seven themed zones: Glamour, Behind the Scenes, History and Heroes, Music, Film, Speed, and Sport. It operates daily from 10:00 AM to 10:00 PM. Admission is 135 Renminbi (US$20) for adults and students. Shanghai became the sixth Madame Tussauds museum worldwide, following those in London, Amsterdam, Las Vegas, New York, and Hong Kong.

== See also ==
- Peak Galleria
- Tourism in Hong Kong
