= Doomsday Party =

2013 Hong Kong film by Ho Hong

- Film poster
- Directed by: Ho Hong
- Written by: Ruby Law; Joe Chan; Grace Mak; Ho Hong
- Produced by: Teddy Robin; Ho Hong; Roddy Wong
- Starring: Paul Wong; Kay Tse; Kelvin Kwan; Teddy Robin; Wilfred Lau
- Cinematography: Cheng Siu-Keung
- Edited by: Wenders Li
- Music by: Teddy Robin; Tommy Wai
- Production company: Film Plus Plus Production
- Release date: 28 November 2013
- Running time: 97 minutes
- Country: Hong Kong
- Language: Cantonese

Doomsday Party is a 2013 Hong Kong drama film directed by newcomer Ho Hong and featuring an ensemble cast including Paul Wong, Kay Tse, Kelvin Kwan, Teddy Robin and Wilfred Lau.

== Plot ==
The film opens with scenes of angry protests in front of Hong Kong's LegCo building. Following a double bomb scare, police attempt to disperse the crowd, only to fuel further rage. A few blocks away, Lang (Kelvin Kwan) and his acolyte Fish (Fish Liew) take advantage of the surrounding chaos to hold up a bank. Armed with a pistol and makeshift bombs, they threaten employees and customers, among whom police detective Kin-Ho (Paul Wong), celebrity English tutor Victor Lo (Wilfred Lau), bank clerk Wan Yee (Kay Tse), councillor Ho (KK Cheung), his mistress Rebecca (Maggie Chan), and an old man clinging to a mysterious envelope (Teddy Robin).

After the opening credits, the action goes back in time to follow the intertwining lives of these eight characters.

== Cast ==
- Goon Chung Wong as Ho (as Paul Wong)
- Kay Tse as Wan-yee
- Teddy Robin Kwan
- Kelvin Kwan as Lang
- Wilfred Lau as Victor
- Maggie Chan as Rebecca
- Kwok-Keung Cheung
- Ka-Wah Ho

== Reception ==
In the South China Morning Post, Yvette Leh rated the film 3/5, stating "Ho, who directed, wrote and co-produced the film, is to be commended for an ambitious work packed with substantive content and believable characters." Clarence Tsui of The Hollywood Reporter showed less enthusiasm: "the initial rage against Hong Kong's ruling machine ... quickly dissipates to reveal clichéd romantic or familial melodrama".
