= Gaile Lok =

Hong Kong actress and model (born 1980)

- 樂基兒
- Born: Lok Ga Yi; 22 August 1980 (age 46); Macau
- Occupations: Actress; model
- Spouses: Leon Lai (m. 2008; div. 2012) Ian Chu (m. 2017; div. 2022)
- Children: 1

Chinese name
- Traditional Chinese: 樂基兒
- Simplified Chinese: 乐基儿
Transcriptions
Standard Mandarin
- Hanyu Pinyin: Lè Jīér
Yue: Cantonese
- Yale Romanization: Lok^{6} Gei^{1} Yan^{4}

Lai Ga Yi
- Traditional Chinese: 黎嘉儀
- Simplified Chinese: 黎嘉仪
Transcriptions
Standard Mandarin
- Hanyu Pinyin: Lí Jiāyí
Yue: Cantonese
- Yale Romanization: Lai^{4} Ga^{1} Yi^{4}

Gaile Lai (simplified Chinese: 乐基儿; traditional Chinese: 樂基兒; pinyin: Lè Jīér), born Lai Ga Yi (simplified Chinese: 黎嘉仪; traditional Chinese: 黎嘉儀; pinyin: Lí Jiāyí) on 22 August 1980, better known as Gaile Lok, is a Hong Kong actress and model. She was born in Macau to a Chinese father and a Vietnamese mother.

== Early life ==
Gaile Lok is of Chinese-Vietnamese descent; her mother is Kinh Vietnamese. She was born in Macau but was raised in the United States. She made her film debut starring in the 2000 romantic film, I Do, and subsequently appeared in another film entitled My Sweetie in 2004.

== Personal life ==
In 2006, Gaile began dating Leon Lai, a Hong Kong actor and singer. Their relationship led to Gaile becoming a target of paparazzi and the media. In 2006, a magazine published an article with intimate photographs of her and Lai at the latter's residence, prompting the Hong Kong Actors Guild to protest "irresponsibility" on the part of the magazine. In 2009, Lok and Lai secretly married in Las Vegas at the Wynn Hotel, with his manager and assistant acting as witnesses. On 3 October 2012, the couple announced the end of their marriage. Their joint statement stated that the divorce was due to "different philosophies in life".

Lok married businessman Ian Chu in 2017. Their son was born on 29 April 2019.
