= One Night Surprise =

- Directed by: Eva Jin
- Screenplay by: Eva Jin
- Produced by: Peter Lam; Pu Shu Lin; Eva Jin
- Starring: Fan Bingbing; Aarif Rahman; Pace Wu; Jiang Jinfu; Daniel Henney; Leon Lai; Xu Zheng; Eva Jin
- Cinematography: Michael Bonvillain
- Edited by: John L. Roberts
- Music by: Joey Newman
- Distributed by: Cathay Media Group; Media Asia; Draw and Shoot Film
- Release date: 9 August 2013
- Running time: 106 minutes
- Country: China
- Languages: Mandarin; English
- Box office: $26.9 million

One Night Surprise (Chinese: 一夜惊喜) is a 2013 romantic-comedy film directed and written by Eva Jin and starring Fan Bingbing, Aarif Rahman, Pace Wu, Jiang Jinfu and Daniel Henney.

== Plot ==
At her Marie Antoinette-themed birthday bash, Michelle loses her head after a few drinks and wakes up dishevelled in a hotel room. Forty days later, she discovers she's pregnant and sets about finding the culprit. Michelle narrows it down to three suspects who turned up at her shindig: figure-skating teenager Jeb (Jiang Jingfu); seafood-sauce tycoon Tiger (Leon Lai); and her Harvard-educated Chinese-American boss, Bill (Daniel Henney). Their confrontations provide ample opportunities for overdone slapstick and naughty sexual innuendo, but there's also the matter of her incompatibility with any of them, poignantly addressing the harsh reality that she's not exactly long-term relationship material in their eyes. Michelle is sure Bill is the baby's father. Her assistant, Tony Zhang, tries to explain to her that Bill doesn't really love her after they go out to dinner and see Bill eating with his new girlfriend. They end up having a fight, and Tony unexpectedly quits the job at the company, most likely either because he is irritated at Michelle or he doesn't want to annoy her anymore. However, Michelle ends up realizing that Tony is an important part of her life, and is upset when he didn't appear to see her. Tony suddenly decides to go to Africa to photograph animals. He gives Michelle Daisy Jo (her cat) and a turtle. Michelle quits the job at the company and moves to Malaysia and opens her own shop, Michelle's Surprises. Tony comes to see her and reveals he is the one that got her pregnant. Michelle screams because her water broke. Tony proposes. Michelle says "yes." They married with their Chinese friends, and their new daughter Felicity.

== Cast ==
- Fan Bingbing as Michelle
- Aarif Rahman Lee as Tony
- Pace Wu as Weiwei
- Jiang Jinfu as Zhibo
- Daniel Henney as Bill
- Leon Lai as Tiger
- Xu Zheng as He Fengfeng
- Ni Hongjie
- Eva Jin

== Filming ==
The shoot began on 6 September 2012, and lasted three months. The filming locations include Beijing, Tianjin, Nanjing and Penang (Malaysia).

It had to mention that, during the promotion period of the film, Fan got an almost-40-degree fever, but she still finished the roadshows in Shanghai, Chengdu, Changsha, Shenzhen, Changchun, Chongqing. In addition, Fan, the director, Aarif, and Jiang Jinfu also involved in some variety shows and media interviews for the promotion.

== Reception ==
=== Box office ===
As of 25 August, the film has grossed more than $26,930,000, and this is a huge financial success, compared with the budget less than $3 million.

=== Critical reception ===
This film received positive reviews. The Los Angeles Times wrote that "though Jin set One Night Surprise in Beijing, it's a sexy, cosmopolitan tale whose bilingual characters could just as easily be going to clubs with pole dancers and driving their Mercedes-Benzes in Seoul, Paris or L.A." Variety said this film was a "remixing ideas from dude-centric Hollywood laffers like The Hangover and Knocked Up, but retooled for China’s distaff demographic, this date movie is at once sweetly whimsical and full of ballsy sexual wisecracks. Sleek filmmaking, dollhouse visuals and Fan’s international profile could parlay the pic into niche release overseas" and "the film’s lightly comic tone also conceals a fair measure of insight into the social stigma facing single career women in their 30s (nicknamed "leftover women" in China)".
