= Jill Vidal =

Hong Kong singer (born 1982)

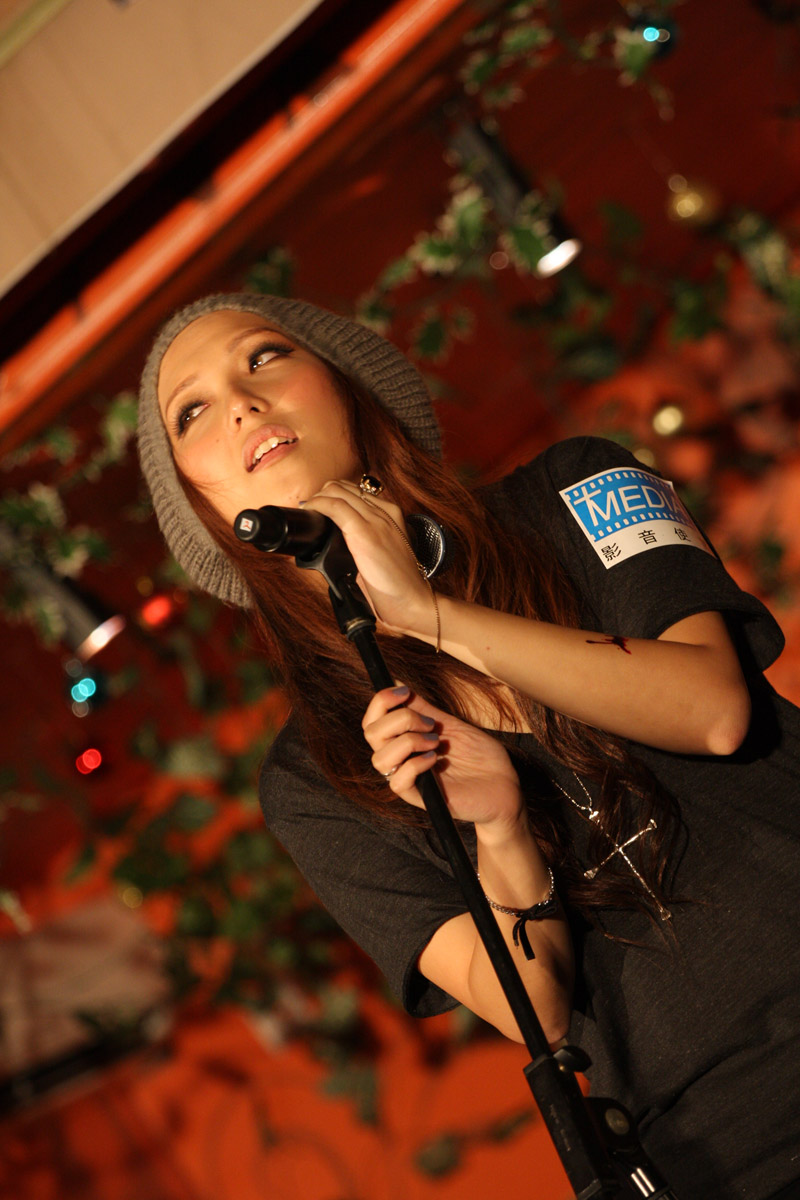
- Vidal in 2010
- Born: 13 April 1982 (age 44); Hong Kong
- Occupations: Singer; actress
- Years active: 2006–present

Chinese name
- Traditional Chinese: 衛詩
- Simplified Chinese: 卫诗
- Jyutping: wai^{6} si^{1}
Transcriptions
Standard Mandarin
- Hanyu Pinyin: Wèi Shī
Yue: Cantonese
- Jyutping: wai^{6} si^{1}
- Musical career
- Also known as: Wei Si
- Genres: Cantopop; contemporary R&B; urban pop; urban contemporary
- Instruments: Vocal; guitar; piano
- Label: Warner Music Hong Kong

Jill Vidal (Chinese: 衛詩) often referred to as Wei Si or simply as Jill, is a Hong Kong–based urban pop singer and actress. She is of Filipino, Korean, and Chinese ethnicity. Her twin sister, Janice Vidal, is also a singer in Hong Kong.

== Career ==
=== Music ===
In 2005, Jill Vidal entered the music industry by signing with Amusic, a subsidiary of East Asia Record Production. She released her first song, "Lonely", in December 2005, and her debut album, Hit Me, came out in 2006.

In 2015, she joined Warner Music Hong Kong, along with her twin sister, Janice Vidal. Her first single under the label, "Fulfilled Love" (被滿足的愛) (feat. San E), was released on 16 May 2016. An English version, "I Can See" (feat. San E), came out on 24 June. On 17 October of the same year, Vidal's second single, "Need for Love" (感情需要), came out. On 12 December, she published her third single, "Lonely Christmas", originally by Eason Chan.

On 10 April 2017, Vidal's fourth single, "Tattoo" (刺青), was released and climbed to the No. 1 spot on Metro Radio FM 99.7. On 27 November of the same year, she issued the song "Suffocate" (缺氧).

=== Acting ===
Vidal made her film debut in 2006 in the musical film A Melody Looking directed by Leon Lai.

=== Theatre ===
In August 2014, Vidal starred in the African theatre production TELEMA! Awaken the Dream, celebrating the 51st anniversary of Martin Luther King Jr.'s 1963 "I Have a Dream" speech.

=== Advertising ===
In 2006, Vidal and her sister starred in a McDonald's commercial involving Chinese tongue twisters.

=== Reborn book release ===
On 23 July 2011, Vidal published her autobiography, Reborn, which emphasizes her adoption of Christianity.

=== Vidal jewellery ===
In November 2016, Vidal launched her own jewellery label, "Vidal", in collaboration with the charity organisation and international jewellery label Eden Ministry, which employs former sex workers.

== Personal life ==
=== Arrest ===
Vidal and her singer boyfriend Kelvin Kwan were arrested in Tokyo on 24 February 2009 over allegations of cannabis possession. Police were summoned when the pair were caught shoplifting in the district of Shibuya, and the illicit drug was subsequently found in a cigarette in their possession. Kwan confessed to the police that it had been given to him by a friend in Hong Kong, while Vidal said that she was not aware the cigarette contained cannabis. Urine tests later returned positive results for cannabis for Kwan, and the police allegedly found another banned substance in the pair's luggage. Kwan was released without charge after 32 days in jail. Local newspapers later reported that Vidal was being held for heroin possession.

On 24 April, Vidal pleaded guilty to heroin possession in a Tokyo court and was sentenced to two years' imprisonment, suspended for three years. She was deported back to Hong Kong and did not serve any prison time.

== Discography ==
- Hit Me (2006)
- Diamond Love (2006)
- Jillympics (New + Best Selection) (2008)
- Stages (2022)

== Filmography ==
Release date	Title	Chinese Title	Role
2006	A Melody Looking	緣邀之音	Jill
2012	A Dream Team	翻身奇兵	Eve
