= Amusic =

Hong Kong record label

- Parent company: eSun Holdings, a subsidiary of Lai Sun Development: East Asia Record Production Ltd.; Paciwood Music & Entertainment Ltd
- Founded: 2004; 21 years ago
- Founder: Peter Lam, Leon Lai, Mark Lui
- Status: Active
- Distributor(s): Media Asia Music
- Genre: Cantopop, Hong Kong English pop
- Country of origin: Hong Kong
- Location: Kwun Tong, Kowloon, Hong Kong
- Official website: www.amusic.hk

Amusic is the record label of East Asia Record Production Co., Ltd., a subsidiary of Paciwood Music & Entertainment Ltd. It was founded by businessman Peter Lam and singer Leon Lai on 28 July 2004.

Its purpose is developing artists with potential and strength to produce music with quality and diversity so as to reward music lovers. Its sister company is East Asia Record Group Co., Ltd.

The first artist to be signed by the company was Leon Lai and the first album, "Dawn" was released by the company in 2004.

On 20 December 2005, Amusic released a Christmas compilation album consisting of songs of Leon Lai, Janice Vidal, Charles Ying, Jill Vidal and Chapman To. The album purpose was to promote Jill and let the people to know more about her. At the same time, Leon participated in the vocals of Chapman R&B style song "Joy till dawn".

In November 2006, Amusic caused a stir when it announced it would release 4 new albums on the same day, 21 November. The albums were by Leon Lai, Janice Vidal, her twin sister Jill Vidal, and Chapman To.

== Artists ==
=== Amusic ===
The artists currently under the record labels are:

==== Current ====
- Leon Lai (2004–present)
- JC (2016–present)
- Michael Wong (2005–present)
- Kwon Bo Young (2007–present)
- Aarif Rahman (2009–present)

==== Former ====
- Janice Vidal (2004–2015)
- Jill Vidal (2005–2009)
- Emily Wong (2004–2015)
- Charles Ying (2005–2014)
- Miriam Yeung (2007–2009)
- Janice Man (2009–2014)
- JW (2010–2015)

=== East Asia Music ===
The artists currently under its sister company are:

- Andy Lau (2007 – present)
- Sammi Cheng (2005 – present)
- Andy Hui (2006 – present)
- Denise Ho (2004 – present)
- Wilfred Lau (2007 – 2010)
- Ivana Wong (2007 – present)
- Richie Ren (2008 – present)
- Bosco Wong
- Josie Ho
- Charmaine Fong (2006 – present)
- Stephanie Cheng (2006 – 2007)
- Monie Dong
- Alex Lau
- Vincent Wang
- Rene Liu
- Yu Xian Zhong
- Soler (2005 – present)
- Ivan Wang (2006 – present)
- Sandy Lam (2007 – present)
- Joey Tang (2005 – present)

In late 2008, eSun Holdings bought Capital Artists, and renamed Amusic. It has now been turned into Amusic + Capital Artists. Capital Artists closed down in 2001, due to financial problems, and was said not to produce music. In the early of 2009, it opens back and produces music again. Miriam Yeung was the first singer to sign back to Capital Artists in 2010.

=== Capital Artists ===
- Miriam Yeung (2010 – present)
- Wilfred Lau (2010 – present)
- William So (2011–present)

== See also ==
- List of record labels
