= Once Upon a Song =

- Written by: Leung Man-wah
- Directed by: Wong Kwok-keung
- Starring: Evelyn Choi; Kelvin Kwan; Kate Yeung; Jason Chan; William So; Bernice Liu; Zac Kao; Shek Sau; Mimi Kung; Rain Lau
- Opening theme: "做場好戲" by William So, Charles Ying, Kate Yeung, Jason Chan, Lesley Chiang, Benji Chiang
- Ending theme: "隻字不提" by Kelvin Kwan
- Country of origin: Hong Kong
- Original language: Cantonese
- No. of episodes: 16

Production
- Production locations: Hong Kong; Japan
- Camera setup: Multi-camera
- Running time: 39–44 minutes
- Production company: Hong Kong Television Network

Original release
- Release: January 16 – February 6, 2015

Once Upon a Song (Chinese: 童話戀曲201314), is a 2015 musical drama television series produced by Hong Kong Television Network. The first episode premiered on January 16, 2015.

== Cast ==
- Evelyn Choi as Yan Chi-ching
- Kelvin Kwan as Keith
- Kate Yeung as Jade
- Jason Chan as Handsome
- William So as Simon
- Bernice Liu as Agnes
- Zac Kao as Calvin
- Shek Sau as Jonathan
- Mimi Kung as Julie
- Rain Lau as Lee Mei-ha
- Lesley Chiang as Karlie
- Charles Ying as Sky
- Lisa Lui as Cheung Hiu-wan
- Savio Tsang as Yip Ming
- Benji Chiang as Alex
- Karen Lee as Heidi
- Leung Kin-ping as Wilson
- Wilson Tsui as Jade's biological father
- Yau Biu as Do
- Sin Ho-ying as Re
- Wong Man-piu as Mi
- Dexter Young as Dr. Charles Kwok, episode 6 and 9
- Mark Lui as mysterious traffic officer, episode 15 and 16

== Song list ==
- "做場好戲" by William So, Charles Ying, Kate Yeung, Jason Chan, Lesley Chiang, Benji Chiang (Opening theme song)
- "隻字不提" by Kelvin Kwan (Ending theme song)
- "得天獨厚" by Jade (Kate Yeung) (Music video for Kate Yeung's character Jade on episode 1)
- "即使不再是朋友" by Simon (William So) (Music video for William So's character Simon on episode 3)
- "追蹤彩虹" by Evelyn Choi (Ending theme song on episode 3)
- "Forever" by Lesley Chiang (Karlie's audition on episode 4)
- "得而復失" by Evelyn Choi (Ending theme song on episode 6)
- "愛即是遊戲" by Charles Ying (Dance-off on episode 8)
- "一字一淚" by Jason Chan (Episode 11)
- "奇蹟" by Kate Yeung (Ending theme song on episode 11)
