= Charles Ying =

Hong Kong singer

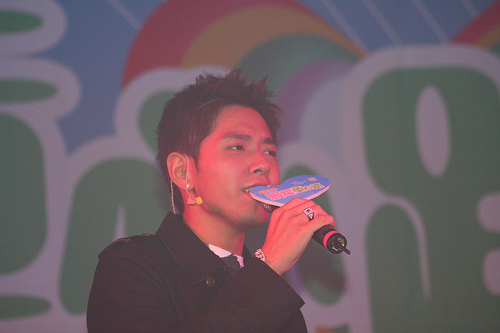
- Born: Ying Cheung Yau; 2 April 1979 (age 47); British Hong Kong
- Education: Rhode Island School of Design
- Occupations: singer, actor
- Years active: 2004–present
- Spouse: Mandy Foo (m. 2012)
- Children: Travis Ying (son); Alison Ying (daughter)

Chinese name
- Traditional Chinese: 應昌佑
- Simplified Chinese: 应昌佑
Transcriptions
Standard Mandarin
- Hanyu Pinyin: Yīng Chāng yòu
Yue: Cantonese
- Jyutping: jing1 coeng1 jau6
- Musical career
- Genres: Cantopop
- Instruments: vocal, piano
- Labels: Amusic (2005–2014); TL Entertainment (2015–present); Star Entertainment (2015–present)

Charles Ying is a Cantopop singer and actor from Hong Kong. After singing the theme song Do I Still Love You of the film Leaving me, Loving you, he was signed by Leon Lai of East Asia Record Production and became one of the new hotly promoted new artists in 2005.

After receiving a degree from the Rhode Island School of Design, he became a Hong Kong–based Nike, Inc. designer. According to HK01, his songs largely have to do with "bitter love", including "Do I Still Love You", "How Can I Lose My Love", "It's My Bad", "Thank You for Lonely".

== Discography ==
=== Cantonese albums ===
Released date	Album title	Music label
28 November 2005	Charles	East Asia Music

== Filmography ==
- Fire of Conscience (2010)
- Bruce Lee, My Brother (2010)
- ICAC Investigators 2011 (2011)
- Once Upon a Song (2015)
- Beyond the Rainbow (2015)
- Love in Time (2015)
