= Janice Vidal =

Hong Kong pop singer

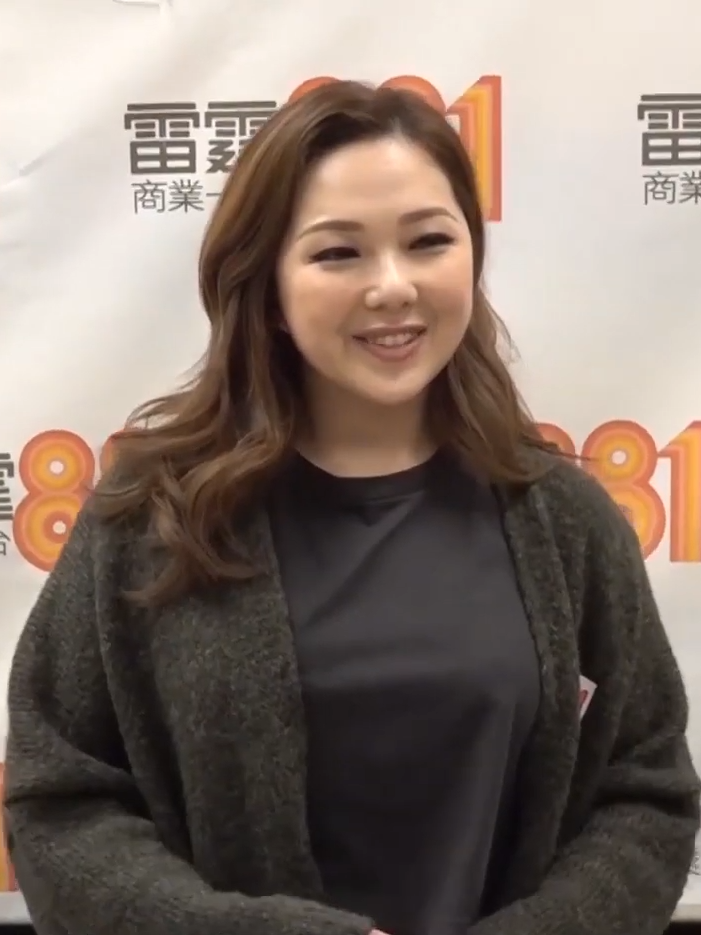
- Vidal in 2020

Background information
- Born: British Hong Kong
- Genres: Cantopop
- Occupations: Singer; actress
- Instruments: Vocals
- Years active: 2005–present
- Labels: Amusic (2004–2015); Warner Music (2015–2023)

Chinese name
- Traditional Chinese: 衛蘭
- Simplified Chinese: 卫兰
Transcriptions
Standard Mandarin
- Hanyu Pinyin: Wèi Lán
Yue: Cantonese
- Jyutping: Wai6 Laan4

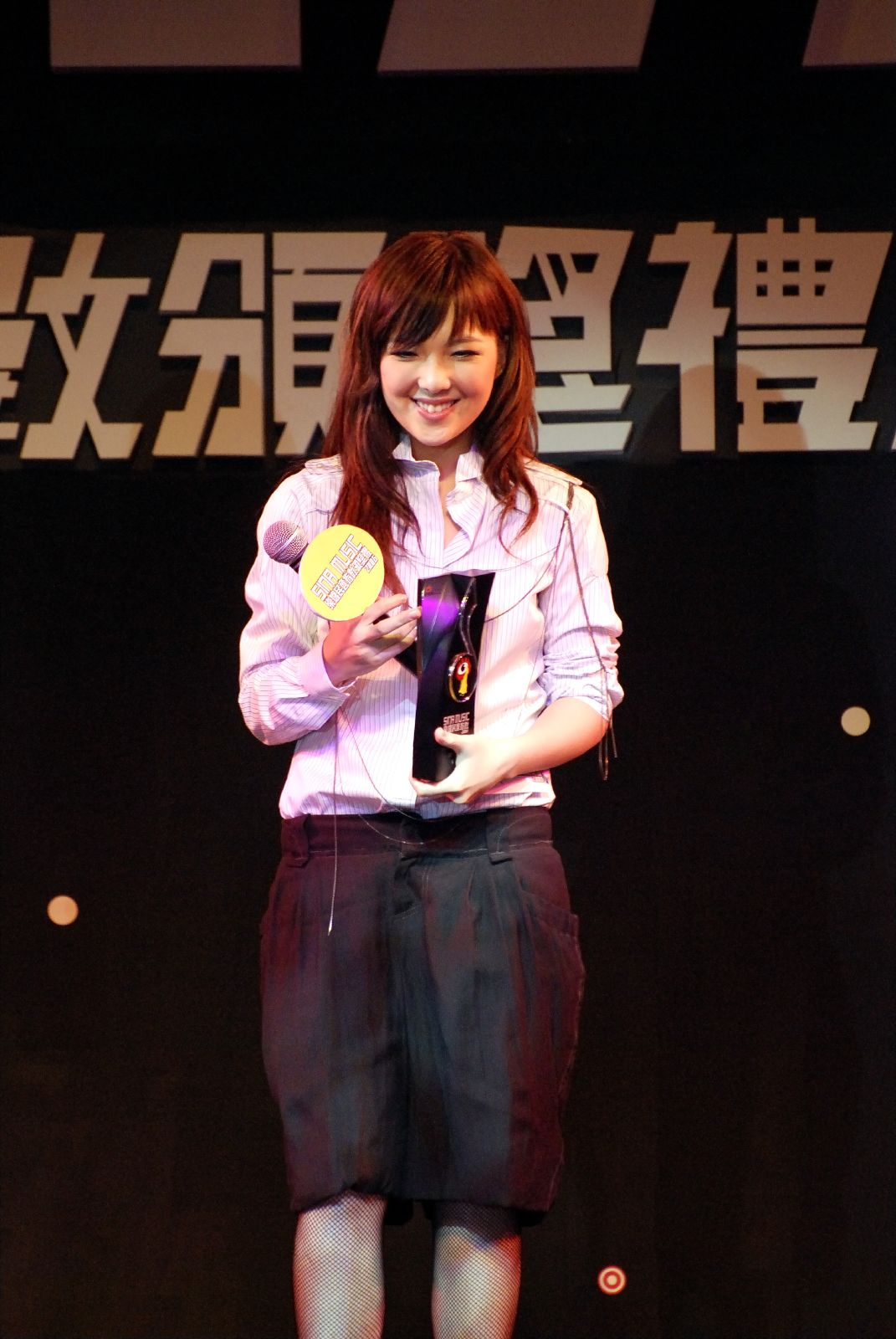
Vidal in 2007

Janice M. Vidal is a Hong Kong Cantopop singer and actress. She was discovered by music producer Mark Lui and initially began her career as a back-up singer for Leon Lai. She debuted as a solo artist in 2004 under Lai's label, Amusic, where she remained until signing with Warner Music in 2015.

She is of mixed Filipino, Chinese, and Korean descent, and she has a twin sister, Jill Vidal, who also sings.

== Biography ==
=== Early life and singing ===
Vidal was born in Kowloon, Hong Kong, to a Filipino father and a mother of mixed Chinese and Korean descent. She worked as a bar singer under the name Renee and joined the 2000 New Talent Singing Awards as Ming Lok Tai (明樂蒂), before adopting her current Chinese name, Wei Lan (衛蘭).

=== Music career ===
In December 2004, Vidal attracted media attention by covering one of Leon Lai's hits, "Long Distance" (情深說話未曾講), in English. She soon followed it with a Christmas version of another Lai song, "Bu Ke Yi Shi" (不可一世), sung in Cantonese. Vidal was signed to Lai's label, Amusic, the same year, and she released her debut album, Day & Night, in April 2005. Her second album, My Love, followed in November 2005.

Vidal issued her third studio album, Do U Know, in 2006, and she held her first concert series from 29 March to 1 April 2007, as part of a four-night stint at the Hong Kong Coliseum; it was called "My First Concert". A year later, she published her fourth album, Serving You. Her first English-language record, Morning, came out in 2009.

From 28 April 2007 to 13 May 2007, Madame Tussauds Hong Kong organised the "Madame Tussauds – Your Celebrity Choice for This Summer" competition, with the aim of selecting a new wax portrayal to be displayed in the museum. Vidal won the competition, and her wax portrayal went on display in the glamour section on 18 July 2007. The statue is dressed in a green ballet dress, which she wore during "My First Concert".

In November 2009, Vidal released her first greatest hits album, titled Wish (New + Best Selection). She returned with a new Cantonese album, Love Diaries, in 2010. She followed it with Imagine (2012), E11 (2014), and Love and Other Things (2017). Also in 2017, she published her first Mandarin-language album, simply titled 衛蘭 (Vidal's Chinese name). Two further Cantonese records followed: In His Name in 2019 and Daughter in 2022.

=== Acting ===
Vidal appeared in the 2008 Leon Lai-led musical film A Melody Looking, alongside her sister.

=== Personal life ===
In a 2009 interview with South China Morning Post, Vidal stated that she had become Buddhist about six years prior. She has since converted to Christianity, together with her sister.

== Discography ==
=== Studio albums ===
Year	Album	Language
2005	Day & Night	Cantonese
2005	My Love	Cantonese
2006	Do U Know	Cantonese
2008	Serving You	Cantonese
2009	Morning	English
2009	Wish (New + Best Selection)	Cantonese
2010	Love Diaries	Cantonese
2012	Imagine	Cantonese
2014	E11	Cantonese
2017	Love and Other Things	Cantonese
2017	Janice Vidal Mandarin Album	Mandarin
2019	In His Name	Cantonese
2022	Daughter	Cantonese

=== Live albums ===
- Fairy Concert 2010 (2010)
- 3000 Day and Night Concert 2012 (2012)

== Awards ==
Year	Ceremony	Category	Result	Ref.
2005		Metro Radio		
2006		Commercial Radio Female Newbies of the Year – Gold		
2006		TVB Best New Female Singer – Gold		
2006		TVB Top 10 Song: "Run Away from Home"		
2006		TVB Best Performance – Silver		
2006		TVB Four Media Best Performance Award – Gold		
2006		RTHK Best New Female Singer – Gold		
2006		Sina Music Best Female Newbies – Gold		
2006		Sina Most Listened Duets – "24"		
2006		IFPI Hong Kong – 2005 Ten Best Sales Local Artists		
2006		IFPI Hong Kong – 2005 Most Sales Female Newbies		
2007		Commercial Radio Best Female Singer – Bronze		
2007		Metro Radio Best Female Singer		
2007		Metro Radio Karaoke Hit Song: "My Love My Fate"		
2007		Metro Radio Hit Song: "Run Away from Home"		
2007		29th (2008) RTHK Top Ten Singers 2007		
2007		Sina Music No 3 Most Listened – "離家出走" ("Run Away from Home")		
2007		Sina Music Direct Most Listened Program – Janice x Jill new album		
2008		30th (2009) RTHK Top Ten Singers 2008		
2008		Metro Radio My Most Admired Female Singer		
2008		Metro Radio Hit Song: "Doesn't Matter"		
2010		32nd (2009) RTHK Top 10 Song Award – "就算世界無童話" ("If the World Has No Fairy Tales")		
2010		32nd (2009) RTHK Vocalist Award (Commonly known as Top 10 Singer, was awarded to more than 10 singers in 2009)		
2010		2009 Sina Music Most Listened 20 – "就算世界無童話" ("If the World Has No Fairy Tales")		
2010		2009 Sina Music Most Listened Album – Wish		
2010		IFPI Hong Kong – 2009 Ten Best Sales Releases, Cantonese – Serving You		
2010		IFPI Hong Kong – 2009 Ten Best Sales Releases, Cantonese – Wish		
2010		IFPI Hong Kong – 2009 Ten Best Sales Local Artists		
2010		IFPI Hong Kong – 2009 Ten Best Sales Local Female Vocalists		
2010		Metro Radio Hit Song: "愛在天地動搖時" ("Love While the World Is Shaking")		
2010		Metro Radio Hit Duet Song: "男人信甚麼" ("What Men Believe") – with JW		
2010		Metro Radio Best Female Singer		
2010		Metro Radio Best Song: "男人信甚麼" ("What Men Believe") – with JW		
