= Leon Lai =

Hong Kong singer and actor (born 1966)

Leon Lai SBS BBS MH
- 黎明
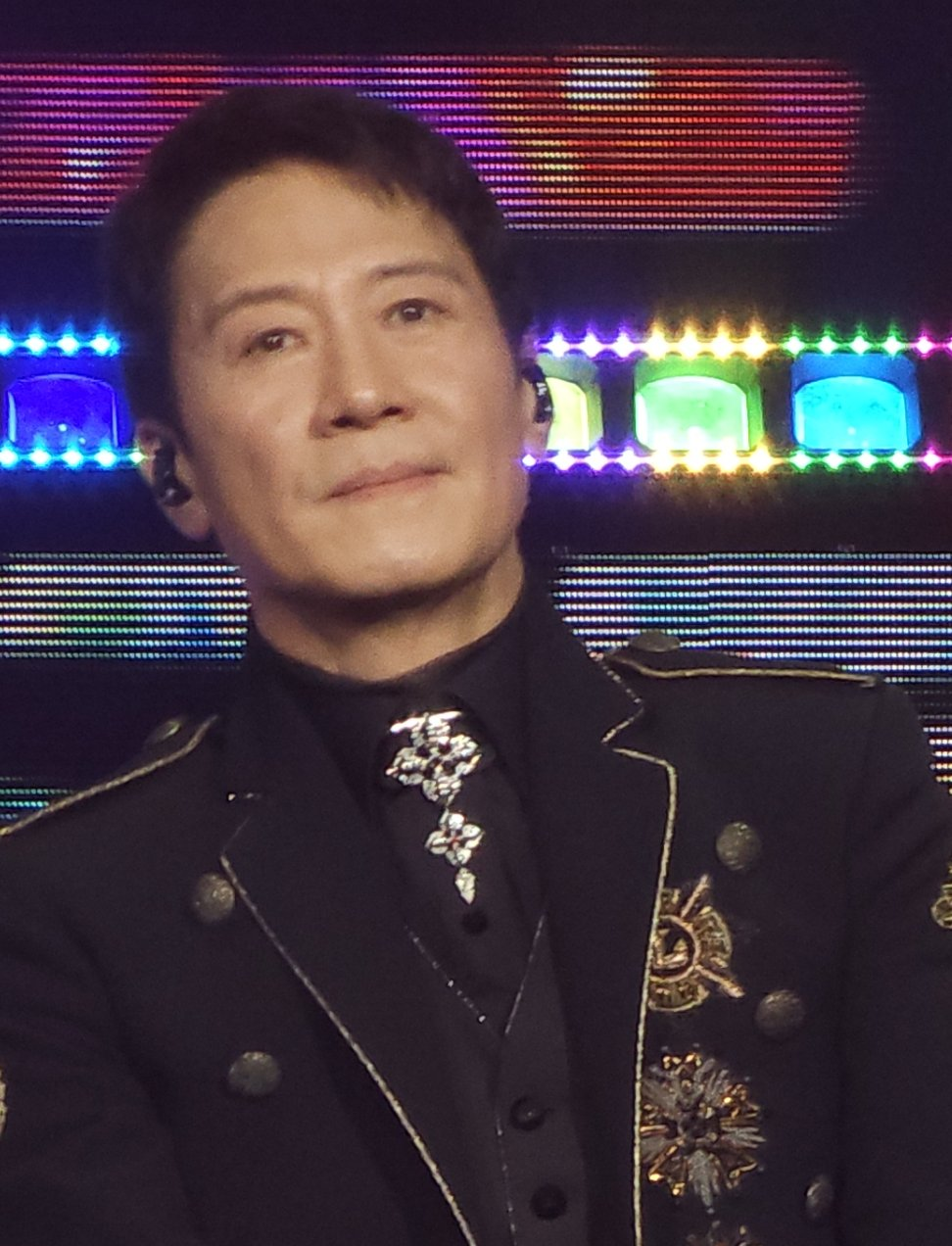
- Lai in 2026
- Born: 11 December 1966 (age 59); Beijing, China
- Education: Kingsway Princeton College
- Occupations: Singer; actor; record company manager; businessman
- Years active: 1985–present
- Spouse: Gaile Lok (m. 2008; div. 2012)
- Children: 1
- Awards: Full list
- Musical career
- Origin: Hong Kong
- Genres: Cantopop; Mandopop
- Instruments: Vocals; guitar; piano
- Labels: PolyGram (1990–1998); Sony Music (1998–2004); Amusic (2004–present)

Chinese name
- Chinese: 黎明
- Hanyu Pinyin: Lí Míng
- Jyutping: Lai4 Ming4

Leon Lai Ming SBS BBS MH (Chinese: 黎明; born 11 December 1966), is a Hong Kong actor, singer, film director, and businessman. He is one of the "Four Heavenly Kings" of Hong Kong pop music.

== Early life ==
Lai was born in Beijing, China. His family, of Hakka ancestry, was from Meixian. He migrated with his father to Hong Kong at the age of four, following his parents' separation when he was one year old. At the age of 15, he attended Christ College in the United Kingdom, but returned to Hong Kong at 18 in 1984.

== Career ==
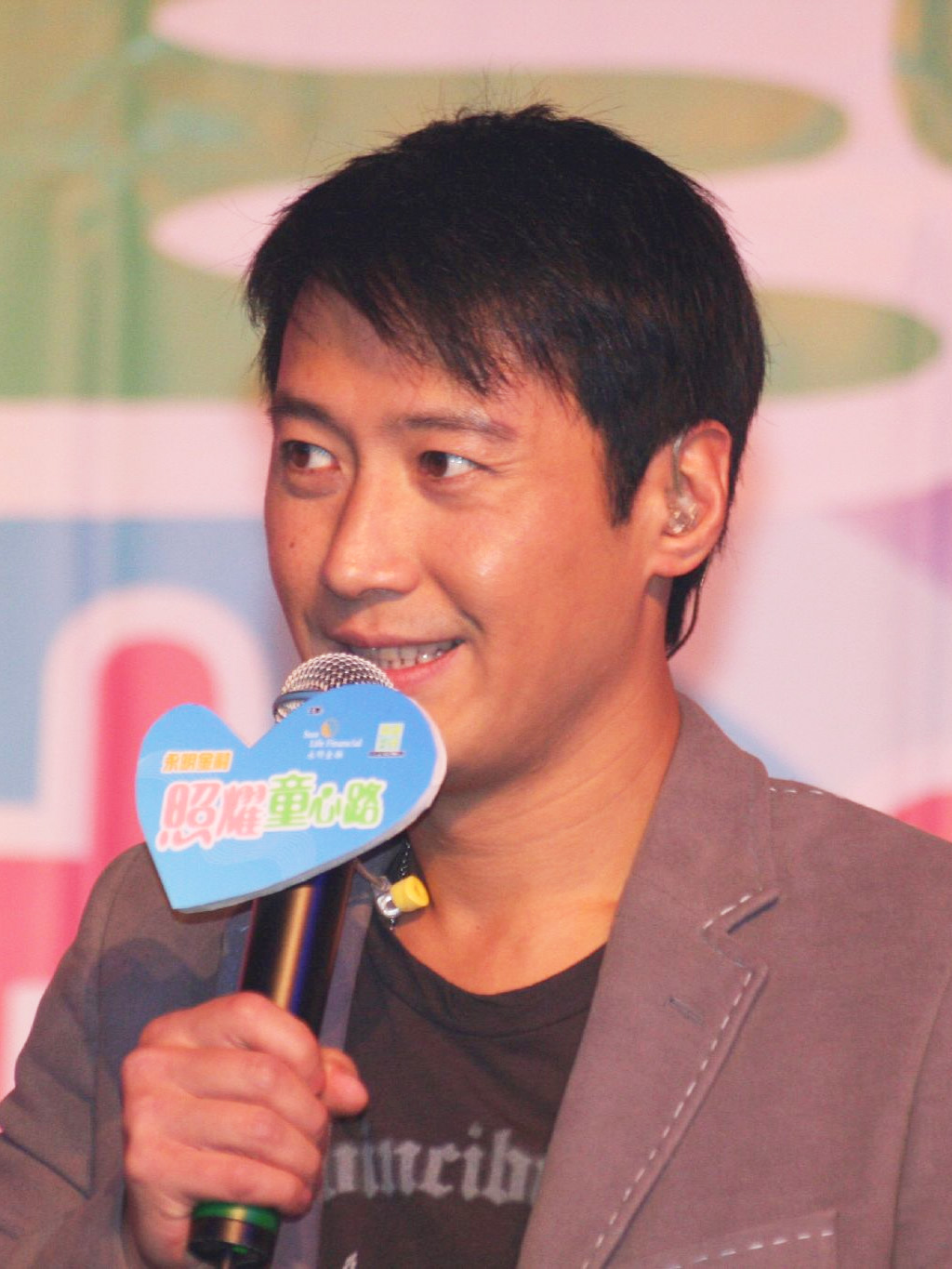
Lai in 2006

=== Early years ===
Lai initially worked as a salesperson for a mobile phone company. After being awarded second-runner-up in the 1986 New Talent Singing Awards, Lai received vocal coaching from Dai Sicong (戴思聰). In the same year he signed with Capital Artists. He did not release any albums for four years. As a result, his teacher Dai arranged to have him signed a contract with Polygram, later known as Universal Music.

=== Music ===
In Polygram, he released his first album Leon and subsequent album Meet in the Rain. His debut album went gold.

In 1990 he won his first 1990 Jade Solid Gold Top 10 Awards and 1990 RTHK Top 10 Gold Songs Awards. He followed up to win the "Most Popular Male Singer" award in 1993 and 1995 for TVB Jade Solid Gold. In 1996, he collaborated with composer-producer Steve Barakatt on his album Feel. Two years later in 1998, he became the first Hong Kong singer to reach the Top 10 K-pop chart with the song "After Loving You."

In 2000, Lai's song "All Day Love" (全日愛) got him into trouble with the Chinese authorities for drawing passages from the Chinese National Anthem, "March of the Volunteers". The starting tune was accused of plagiarism from the anthem. Lai was warned against using the song for commercial purposes.

In 2002 he was selected to sing "Charged Up", the 2002 FIFA World Cup theme song for the Greater China region. In 2004, he became the first Hong Kong singer to represent the territory at the first Asia Song Festival held in South Korea.

In 2004, Lai formed a new record label Amusic with Peter Lam. The first album produced by the company, Dawn, was released in September of that year. The album was released with minimum promotion as Lai went to Mainland China for a movie shoot on the day of the album's release.

In 2005, Lai invited Taiwanese music producer Jonathan Lee to produce his new Mandarin album A Story. However, by doing so he had to give up the opportunity for a lead role in a big budget Taiwan movie Silk due to conflicts in his schedules.

He performed at the Hong Kong Coliseum on 13 April 2007 for his one night only Leon 4 in Love Concert, where he performed not only his own hits but also hits from the other three Heavenly Kings. He performed a total of 18 songs, all of which are newly arranged by Mark Lui. He subsequently released an album titled 4 in Love on 3 May 2007, comprising 16 of the 18 songs he had performed at the concert.

Lai was selected to be the ambassador of the 6th Winter Asian Games to be held Changchun in 2007. He sang the Games' theme song and took part in the torch relay. He then joined Michael Wong and Janice Vidal and held a three-day Magic Live charity concert at Star Hall, Hong Kong from 9 to 11 November 2008.

Lai holds his concert at the Hong Kong Coliseum, titled Leon Lai Talk & Sing 2021 Concert, from 10 July 2021, for 9 shows.

==== Duets ====
Apart from being a solo artist, Lai has collaborated with other artists. Some of his better known collaborations are "Love Until the End" and "A Happy Family" with Vivian Chow, "Really Wish to Be Like This Forever" and "It's Still You" with Priscilla Chan, "Song of the Star" with Alan Tam, "Never Give Up" with Jacky Cheung, "Why did I let you go?" with Janice Vidal.

=== Acting career ===
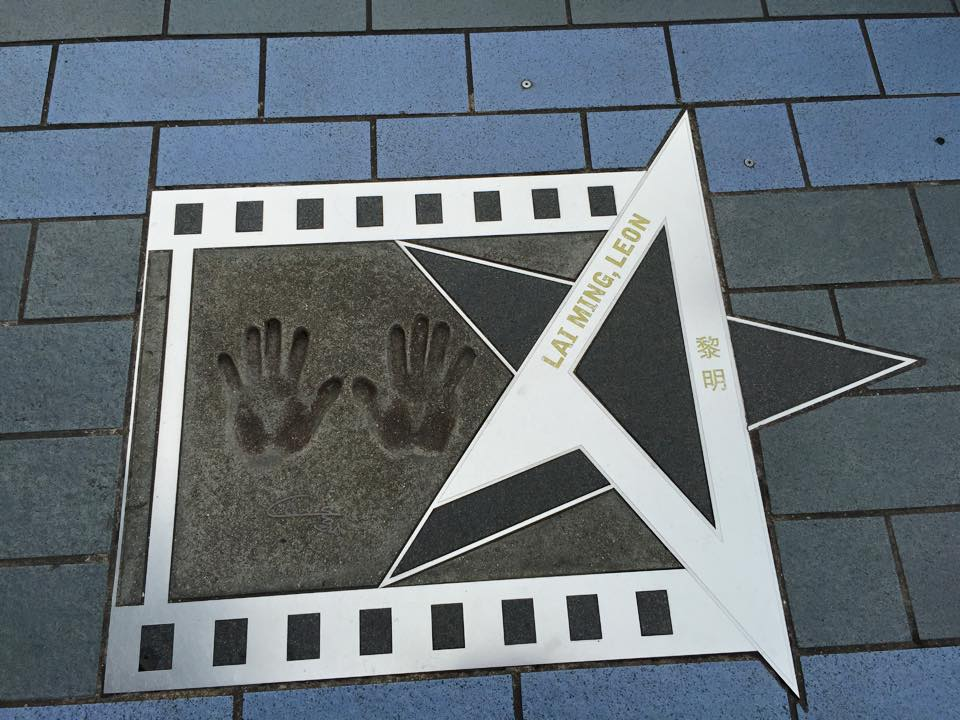
2015 HK TST Promenade Avenue of Stars

After the New Talent Singing Awards, he had some opportunities to star in a few TV series. On one occasion, he went for the filming of a romantic serials titled Fengyun Era (風雲時代) in Taiwan. There was a stark contrast in height between Lai and the popular lead actress who is only 160 cm tall. The actress then demanded that Lai squat while filming so as to make up for the height differences. Lai had to act through all the scenes with the actress while squatting, but he had to endure it as he was not popular at the time. Not long afterwards, his new TVB series The Breaking Point turned out to be a resounding success and propelled him to widespread fame in Hong Kong and Taiwan.

In 1996, Lai was nominated for the Best Actor award at the 16th Hong Kong Film Awards for the film Comrades: Almost a Love Story. The following year in 1997, he won the award of Best Original Song for the film Eighteen Springs both at the Golden Horse Film Festival and Hong Kong Film Awards. He was again nominated for the Best Actor and Best Original Film Song award for the film City of Glass in 1999, but he only won the award for the latter, which he shared with Albert Leung and Dick Lee.

Lai was considered by Lee Ang to act as Li Mu Bai in the film Crouching Tiger, Hidden Dragon, but he had to turn down the offer as he had an advertising contract and live concert about to start, which would not match his shaven head look as was required for the role.

He collaborated with Cecilia Cheung in 2001 for the first time in the Wong Jing directed romantic comedy film, Everyday Is Valentine. In the film, Lai played a serial liar.

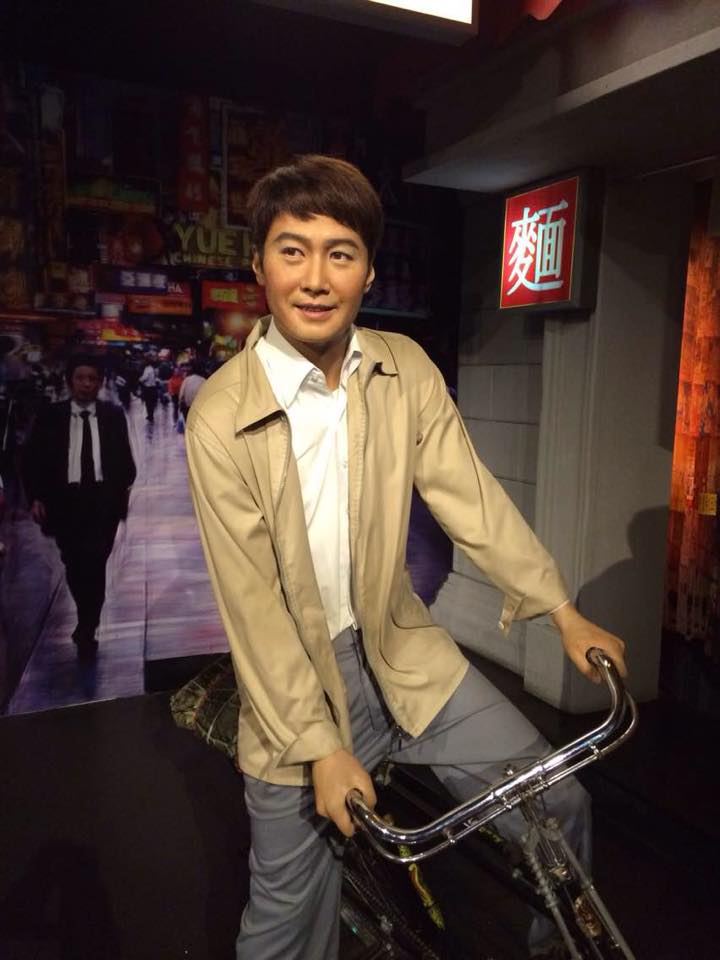
Lai in Madame Tussauds Hong Kong

In 2002, Lai took the spotlight at the Golden Horse Awards, the Chinese-language version of the Oscars in Taiwan. He won Best Actor for Three: Going Home. Lai played a minor role as Superintendent Yeung Kam Wing in Infernal Affairs III in 2003. In 2004, he starred with Faye Wong in the romantic film Leaving Me, Loving You, the story of which he co-wrote with Wilson Yip and he was also the creative/production controller of the film. However, the movie was a flop as it raked in HK$10,529,501 at the box office. Still in that same year he was ranked 8th on the China Celebrity 100 list released by the Chinese edition of Forbes.

In 2005, Lai acted as one of the seven warriors in the Tsui Hark directed wuxia film Seven Swords. In the same year in the film Moonlight in Tokyo, he played a developmentally challenged Chinese man who pretends to be a Korean gigolo in Japan.

In 2006, Lai starred alongside Fan Bingbing and Rene Liu in a love and horror, thriller film titled The Matrimony where he played a cinematographer Shen Junchu. The film was released on 8 February 2007.

In 2007, Lai starred alongside Kelly Chen, Donnie Yen and Guo Xiaodong in the Ching Siu-tung film An Empress and the Warriors. He acted as a woodland medicine man who has a romantic relationship with a princess. Lai and Kelly Chen sang the theme song, "Fly With Your Dreams" written by Albert Leung and composed by Mark Lui.

He underwent training in Peking Opera for playing the lead role as Mei Lanfang in the biographical film Forever Enthralled which was directed by Chen Kaige. He directed the music video for the film where he and Zhang Ziyi sang the theme song, "You Understand My Love". For the first time in his career, Lai played the role of a beggar in the Peter Chan directed film Bodyguards and Assassins. For his success, a wax figure of Lai was revealed at Madame Tussauds Hong Kong.

=== Community ===
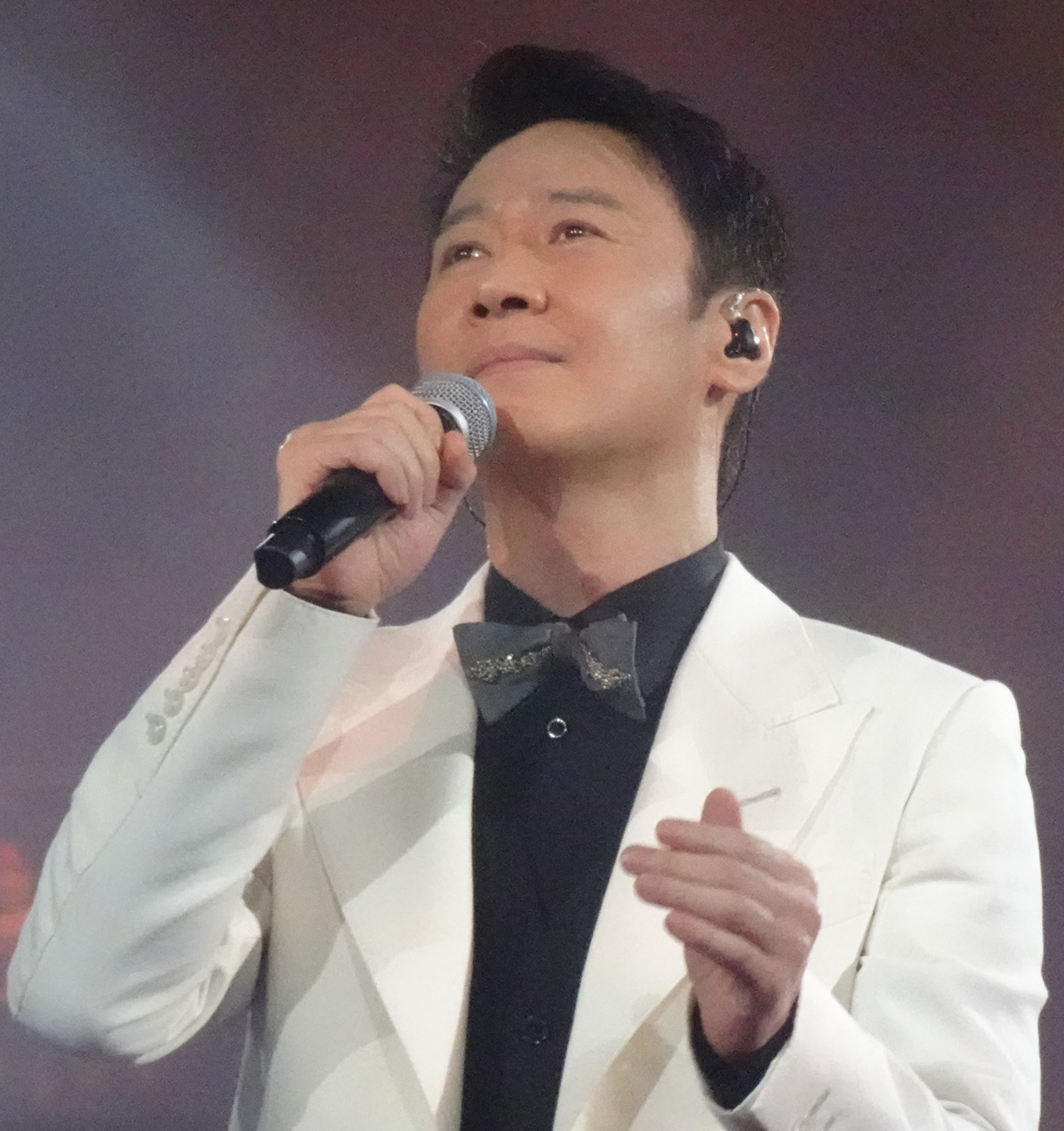
Lai in 2021

Apart from being an actor and singer, Lai is actively involved in the Community Chest. In the 1990s, he began serious charity work when his father was diagnosed with rectal cancer. The doctors said it was incurable. After the surgical operation, his father survived. When the Cancer Research Foundation and the UN organization approached him for help, he started getting actively involved in charity work.

His first work with UNICEF was a China polio eradication project in 1993. He raised substantial funds accruing from his supporters, fans, and concert ticket sales. In July 1994, he was appointed the International UNICEF Goodwill Ambassador, thus becoming the first Hong Kong citizen to be given this position. Since 1994, he has been involved in various fundraising activities of The Hong Kong Committee for UNICEF (HKCU). These activities include seven charity concerts, three charity chocolate sales, and charity walkathons. Lai, along with HKCU representatives, visited Rwanda, Gansu of China, and Brazil to study the work of UNICEF and to help promote public awareness to help children. In December 1995, he was appointed as "UNICEF Special Representative to Youth" at the New York headquarters recognizing his contributions for the welfare of the children.

Lai has also been elected as one of The Ten Outstanding Young Persons (TOYP) in 1997, giving him a formal recognition of his professional endeavors and commitment to the community. He bought the first donation ticket, numbered 000001, at a "Children's Education Fund Raising Campaign" launch event at Tsuen Wan PARKnSHOP's Skyline Superstore in 2001 to encourage people to contribute to a meaningful social cause. The funds raised were donated to the Community Chest.

He was awarded the Medal of Honour (M.H.) on 12 October 2003 by Tung Chee-Hwa, the Chief Executive of Hong Kong.

Since his decision not to receive any music award in Hong Kong, he has not appeared on the TVB Jade Gold Solid Awards ceremony even as a guest, but to secure more funds for charity, he agreed to perform in the ceremony as a guest performer on 8 January 2005. On 13 May the same year, Lai collaborated with Mark Lui to compose the song "8858". The song was used as the promotional song for the China Children and Teenagers' Fund (CCTF). The title of song means "Help Me (which sounds like 'bang bang wo ba' in Putonghua)" and the number "8858" represents the SMS number people can use to donate the money.

In December 2005, Lai appeared in a Hong Kong government television advertisement in support of a gradual political reform package tabled by the ruling government rather than rapid political reform. This was the first time he got himself involved in a politically motivated advertisement.

== Personal life ==
In 2008, Lai secretly married model Gaile Lok at the Wynn Hotel, Las Vegas with his manager and assistant acting as witnesses. On 3 October 2012, the couple announced the end of their four-year marriage. Their joint statement stated that there were "different philosophies in life" which caused the divorce.

In 2017, Lai formed a relationship with his label assistant and later sales manager Chan Wing-yee (陳泳儀), who is 19 years his junior and also a divorcee. On 22 April 2018, Chan gave birth to their daughter.

== Discography ==
(# Literal translation)

Year	English title	Original title	Label
2011	X U		Amusic
2010	Leon Lai New + Best Selections: Fireworks	烟火	Amusic
2008	It's Me	是我	Amusic
2007	4 in Love		Amusic
2006	Looking		Amusic
2005	Long Lasting Love#	長情	Amusic
2005	A Story	一个故事	Amusic
2005	Love & Promises (2004/2005 Special Edition)	愛與承諾#	Amusic
2004	Leon Dawn		Amusic
2004	Leaving Me Loving You OST	大城小事原聲大碟	Amusic
2002	Homework		Sony Music Entertainment (HK)
2002	Leon Charged Up	2002世界盃衝鋒陷陣	Sony Music Entertainment (HK)
2001	The Red Shoes	紅鞋	Sony Music Entertainment (HK)
2001	Hey	喜	Sony Music Entertainment (HK)
2001	The Red Shoes...Evolution	紅鞋...進化#	Sony Music Entertainment (HK)
2000	Beijing Station	北京站	Sony Music Entertainment (HK)
2000	You Are My Friend (Korean Version)		Sony Music Entertainment (HK)
2000	Hot & Cool (Japanese Version)		Sony Music Entertainment (HK)
2000	Leon Club Sandwich		Sony Music Entertainment (HK)
1999	Eyes Want to Travel#	眼睛想旅行	Sony Music Entertainment (HK)
1999	Leon Now		Sony Music Entertainment (HK)
1999	Never Ever (Korean Version)		Sony Music Entertainment (HK)
1999	None But Me	非我莫屬	Sony Music Entertainment (HK)
1999	Leon Now (Korean Version)		Sony Music Entertainment (HK)
1998	I Love You Like This	我這樣愛你	Sony Music Entertainment (HK)
1998	City of Glass OST	玻璃之城電影原聲大碟	Sony Music Entertainment (HK)
1998	If I Can See You Again	如果可以再見你	Sony Music Entertainment (HK)
1998	If I Can See You Again (Japanese Version)	如果可以再見你	Sony Music Entertainment (HK)
1998	Korean Soundtrack		Sony Music Entertainment (HK)
1998	City of Glass OST (Korean Version)	玻璃之城電影原聲大碟	Sony Music Entertainment (HK)
1998	If I Can See You Again (Korean Version)	如果可以再見你	Sony Music Entertainment (HK)
1998	Longing	嚮往	Polygram (HK)
1997	If	假如#	Polygram (HK)
1997	Disagreement of Words and Thoughts	口不對心	Polygram (HK)
1997	DNA Gone Wrong	DNA出錯	Polygram (HK)
1997	I Love You So Much (Korean Version)	我這樣愛你	Polygram (HK)
1997	The World of Leon Lai (Korean Version)		Polygram (HK)
1997	Leons		Polygram (HK)
1997	Leon Sound		Polygram (HK)
1996	Perhaps		Polygram (HK)
1996	Why Aren't You My Future	為何你不是我的未來	Polygram (HK)
1996	Feel	感應	Polygram (HK)
1995	Great Passion Between Sky and Earth	天地豪情	Polygram (HK)
1995	Dream Chase	夢.追蹤	Polygram (HK)
1995	Love is Hard to Get	愛難求	Polygram (HK)
1994	Love Between Sky and Earth	天地情緣	Polygram (HK)
1994	Stay For Me	為我停留	Polygram (HK)
1994	My True Heart is Presented to You	我的真心獻給你	Polygram (HK)
1994	Destined Love + Compilation	情緣	Polygram (HK)
1994	Red Hot Fire Dance	火舞艷陽	Polygram (HK)
1993	My Other Half	我的另一半	Polygram (HK)
1993	Summer of Love	夏日傾情	Polygram (HK)
1993	Autumn Dawn	深秋的黎明	Polygram (HK)
1993	Chateau de Reve	夢幻古堡	Polygram (HK)
1992	Hope We Are Not Just Friends	但願不只是朋友	Polygram (HK)
1992	Accumulating All My Love	堆積情感	Polygram (HK)
1992	The Most Charming Person Compilation	傾城之最	Polygram (HK)
1992	I Love You, OK?		Polygram (HK)
1991	Just Wanna Be Close to You	親近你	Polygram (HK)
1991	Its Love. Its Destiny	是愛是緣	Polygram (HK)
1991	Personal Feeling	我的感覺	Polygram (HK)
1991	Will You Come Tonight	今夜你會不會來	Polygram (HK)
1990	Meet in Rain	相逢在雨中	Polygram (HK)
1990	Leon		Polygram (HK)

== Filmography ==
=== Film ===
Year	English title	Original title	Role	Notes
2019	Old Men			
2018	Wine War	搶紅	Wei-li	
2016	The Choice: A Story of the Old Shanghai			
2016	Night Peacock	夜孔雀		
2016	The Guest	不速之客		
2016	The Secret	消失愛人		
2015	Lady of the Dynasty	王朝的女人·杨贵妃	Emperor Xuanzong of Tang	
2013	One Night Surprise	一夜惊喜	Tiger	
2011	White Vengeance	鴻門宴	Lau Bong	
2010	Frozen	為你鍾情	Cheung Wai-kit	
2010	Fire of Conscience	火龍		
2009	The Magic Aster			
2009	The Founding of a Republic	建國大業	Cai Tingkai	
2009	Bodyguards and Assassins	十月圍城	Liu Yubai	
2008	Forever Enthralled	梅蘭芳	Mei Lanfang	
2008	An Empress and the Warriors	江山美人	Dun Lan Fong	
2007	The Matrimony	心中有鬼	Shen Junchu	
2006	A Melody Looking	緣邀知音	Leon	
2005	Moonlight in Tokyo	情義我心知	Li Tze-Jun	
2005	Seven Swords	七劍	Yang Yuncong	
2004	Leaving Me, Loving You	大城小事	Chow Chang/Zhou Qian	
2003	Infernal Affairs III	無間道	Yeung Kam-wing	
2003	Golden Chicken 2	金雞2	Doctor Chow Man Kwong	
2003	Heroic Duo	雙雄	Jack Lai	
2002	Three: Going Home	三更	Yu Fai	Golden Horse Award for Best Actor; Nominated—Hong Kong Film Award for Best Actor; Nominated—Golden Bauhinia Awards for Best Actor
2001	Bullets of Love	不死情謎	Sam	
2001	Everyday Is Valentine	情迷大話王	OK Lai	
2001	Dream of a Warrior	天士梦	Song Chen	
2000	Skyline Cruisers	神偷次世代	Mac	
2000	Sausalito	一見鍾情	Mike	
1998	A Hero Never Dies	真心英雄	Jack	
1998	City of Glass	玻璃之城	Hui Kong Shen	Nominated—Golden Horse Award for Best Actor; Nominated—Hong Kong Film Award for Best Actor
1998	Love Generation Hong Kong	新戀愛世紀	Bill	
1997	God of Gamblers 3: The Early Stage	賭神3之少年賭神	Ko Chun	
1997	Killing Me Tenderly	愛你愛到殺死你	Lai Su-Kan	
1997	Eighteen Springs	半生緣	Chen Shijun	
1996	Comrades: Almost a Love Story	甜蜜蜜	Lai Siu Kwan	Nominated—Hong Kong Film Award for Best Actor
1995	Fallen Angels	墮落天使	Wong Chiming	
1994	Love and the City	都市情緣	Liang Zhi-wu	
1994	Run	仙人掌	Lam Man-fai	
1993	City Hunter	城市獵人	Kôtetsu/Gundam	
1992	The Sword of Many Loves	飛狐外傳	Wu Fei	
1992	Gun n' Rose	龍騰四海	Siu Lam	
1992	The Magic Touch	神算	Yau Ho-Kay	
1992	The Wicked City	妖獸都市	Renzaburô Taki (dragon)	
1992	With or Without You	明月照尖東	Ming	
1992	Shogun and Little Kitchen	伙頭福星	Lam Fung	
1991	Fun & Fury	痴情快婿	Wai Hon	
1991	The Banquet	豪門夜宴	Cook	
1991	Fruit Punch	Yes一族	Ming	
1989	Four Loves	四千金	Dongni	
1989	Hearts, No Flowers	少女心		
1989	Missing Man	都市獵人	Simon	
1987	Mr. Handsome	美男子	Johnny	

=== Television series ===
Year	English title	Original title
2018	Ever Night	将夜
1994	Class of Distinction	阿SIR早晨
1993	The Legendary Ranger	原振俠
1991	The Breaking Point	今生無悔
1991	Challenge of Life	人在邊緣
1990	Cherished Moments	回到未嫁時(挑戰未來)
1989	Song Bird	天涯歌女
1989	Chun Mun Kong Chuen Kei	晋文公傳奇
1989	Period of Glory	風雲時代
1988	Bing Kuen	兵權
1988	Yankee Boy	回到唐山
1987	A Friend in Need	飛越霓裳
1987	The Foundling's Progress	男兒本色

== Concerts ==
At Hong Kong Coliseum:

Year	Date	English title	Chinese title	No. of Shows	Sponsor
2021	10-18 July	Leon Talk & Sing 2021 Concert		9	AXA
2009	16–19 July	Leon Dream Wedding Live		4	Chow Tai Fook
2007	13 Apr	Leon 4 in Love Concert		1	3
2005	10–15 Oct	Leon Crazy Classic Concert		6	Johnnie Walker Black Label
2001	14–16; 21–25; 28–31 Dec	Leon Live Is Live Concert		12	CitiBank
1999	20 Nov – 12 Dec	Leon Live 99		23	AXA
1997–98	20 Dec – 8 Jan	Leon Lai Live 97		20	G Sushi 元祿壽司
1995	2–27 Nov	Neon Leon Live 95	那一夜我們在霓虹下起舞	26	Hang Seng Bank Credit Card
1993	8–25 Aug	Summer of Love Concert	夏日傾情演唱會	20	Saab
1992	7–14 Oct	Night Devotion Live #	一夜傾情演唱會	10	Kao

(Note: # indicate literal translation)

At Central Harbourfront Event Space, Central Harbourfront:

Year	Date	English title	No. of shows
2022	17-18 December	Drive in Ultra: LOVFINITY Vivienne Tam x Leon Lai Fashion Concert	2
2017	24 February	Penguins in Live 2017	1
2016	29 Apr - 7 May	Leon 30th Anniversary Random Love Songs 4D Live	7

== Awards and nominations ==
Lai was rewarded for his loyalty to the Hong Kong Government in July 2019 by the award of its second highest honour, the Silver Bauhinia Star. The award highlighted particular mention of "his participation in the promotional footage for the Hong Kong Mortgage Corporation Annuity Plan in 2018".

Lai's industry awards and nominations are listed in the tables below.

IFPI
Year	Awards	Albums
2001	IFPI HK Top 10 Sales Album	Leon Club Sandwich
2001	IFPI HK Top 10 Sales Mandarin Album	The Red Shoes
2001	IFPI HK Top Sales Male Artist	
1998	IFPI HK Platinum Disc	I Love You Like This
1997	IFPI HK Platinum Disc	IF
1997	IFPI HK Platinum Disc	Feel
1997	IFPI HK Gold Disc	Leon's ...
1997	IFPI HK Gold Disc	Leon Sound

Commercial Radio
Year	Awards	Songs
1998	Best Male Artist:Silver	
1998	Favourite Male Artist	
1998	No.3 professional recommendation	Jin Shen Bu Zai
1998	Best Co-operation	Leon Lai and Hutchison Telecom
1997	Best Male Artist:Gold	
1997	Favourite Male Artist	
1997	Top 10 Songs professional recommendation	Only if you love me for a day
1997	Favourite Song	Only if you love me for a day
1997	10th anniversary Top 10 Artists	
1996	Best Male Artist:Gold	
1996	Best Ads Song	Unspoken words of sentiment
1996	Four Media IFPI Top award	Perhaps
1995	Best Male Artist:Bronze	
1995	Top 10 Songs professional recommendation	Danger tracking
1994	Most Played Artist:Bronze	
1994	Top 10 Songs	Not one day I don't think of you
1994	Favourite Song	Not one day I don't think of you
1994	Most Favourite Live Performance	Not one day I don't think of you
1994	Top Composed Song	Not one day I don't think of you
1993	Best Male Artist:Bronze	
1993	Favourite Songs	Not willing to leave you tonight Summer Devotion; Summer is burning
1992	Most Played Artist:Bronze	
1992	Favourite Song	My Love; Wish We Are Not Just Friend
1991	Most Played Artist:Bronze	
1990	Most Played Artist:Silver	

== Sources ==
- Yiu-Wai, Chu (2017). Hong Kong Cantopop: A Concise History. Hong Kong: Hong Kong University Press. pp. 112–114. ISBN 9789888390588.
