= Sammi Cheng discography =

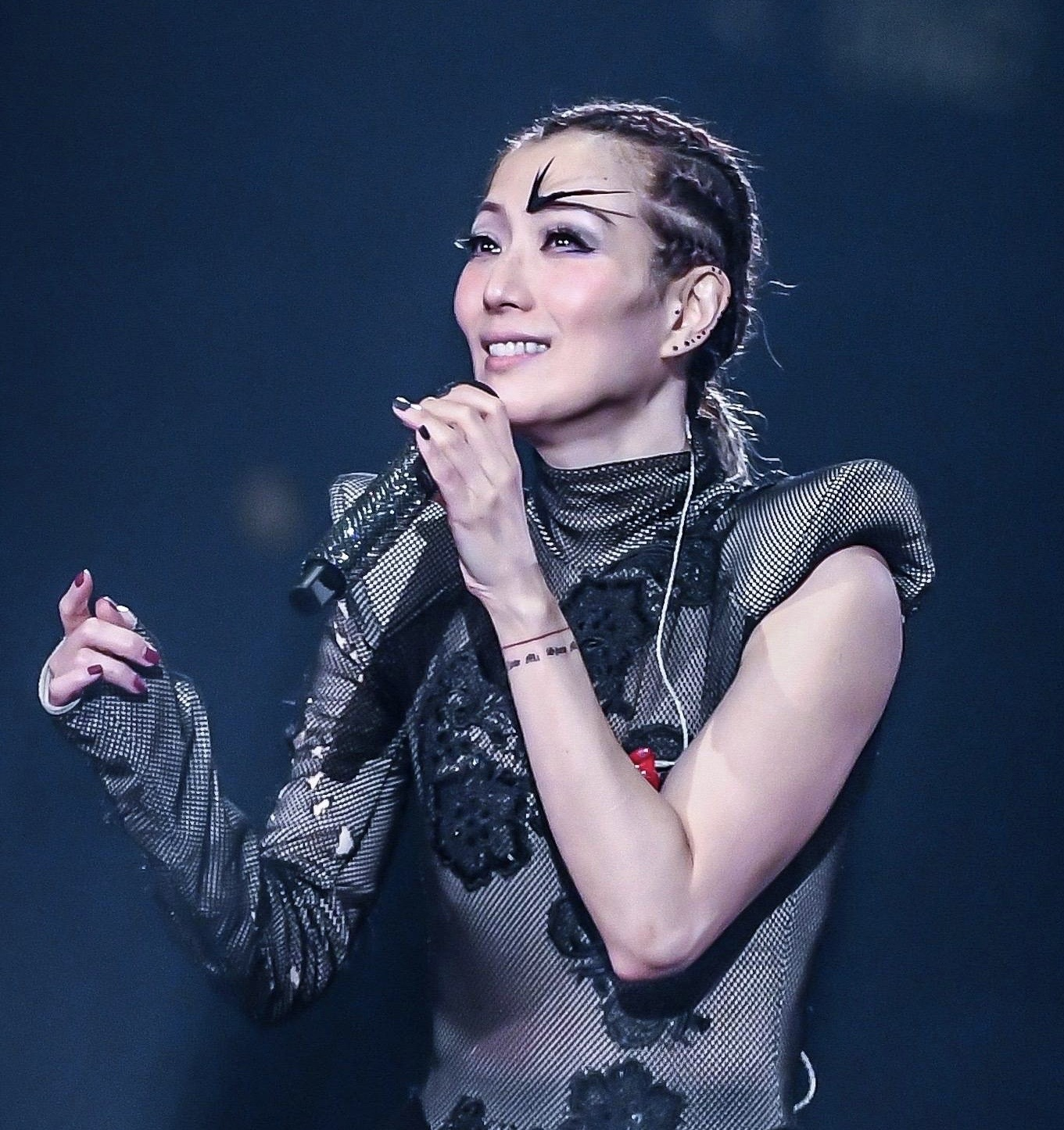
- Cheng in 2019
- Studio albums: 36
- Extended plays: 2
- Live albums: 9
- Compilation albums: 30

The discography of Hong Kong singer Sammi Cheng (鄭秀文) consists of 36 studio albums recorded in Cantonese and Mandarin, 30 compilation albums, 2 extended plays, and 9 live albums. She has sold over 25 million copies of her albums throughout Asia.

In September 1990, Sammi Cheng released her debut album, Sammi, which sold 30,000 copies in Hong Kong. Her sophomore album Holiday was released in June 1991, which topped the Hong Kong album charts and sold over 70,000 copies. Her eighth Cantonese album, Can't Let You Go, sold over 300,000 copies in the territory.

== Studio albums ==
English translations adapted from Tidal.

=== Cantonese-language albums ===
Title	Album details	Peak chart positions		Sales	Certifications
Title	Album details	HK	MLY	Sales	Certifications
Sammi	Released: 14 September 1990; Label: Capital Artists	—	—	HK: 30,000	
Holiday	Released: 18 June 1991; Label: Capital Artists	1	—	HK: 70,000	
Never Too Late	Released: 13 April 1992; Label: Capital Artists	—	—	HK: 60,000	
Happy Maze (鄭秀文的快樂迷宮)	Released: 16 June 1993; Label: Capital Artists	—	—	HK: 100,000	IFPI HK: 2× Platinum
Ten Commandments (十誡)	Released: 7 July 1994; Label: Capital Artists	2	—		
Sammi (Lost Memory)	Released: 20 December 1994; Label: Capital Artists	5	—		
After (其後)	Released: August 1995; Label: Capital Artists	2	—		
Can't Let You Go (捨不得你)	Released: 23 November 1995; Label: Warner Music Hong Kong	1	—	HK: 300,000	IFPI HK: 6× Platinum
Never Want to Give You Up (放不低)	Released: 29 May 1996; Label: Warner Music Hong Kong	1	—	HK: 175,000	IFPI HK: 3× Platinum
Passion (濃情)	Released: 22 November 1996; Label: Warner Music Hong Kong	1	—	HK: 200,000	IFPI HK: 2× Platinum (1997); IFPI HK: 2× Platinum (1998)
Our Theme Song (我們的主題曲)	Released: July 1997; Label: Warner Music Hong Kong	1	—	HK: 145,000	IFPI HK: 2× Platinum
Living Language (生活語言)	Released: November 1997; Label: Warner Music Hong Kong	1	—		IFPI HK: Platinum
Feel So Good	Released: July 1998; Label: Warner Music Hong Kong	1	7	HK: 100,000	IFPI HK: 2× Platinum
Listen to Sammi (聽聞)	Released: January 1999; Label: Warner Music Hong Kong	1	6	HK: 110,000	
Love You So Much (很愛很愛)	Released: September 1999; Label: Warner Music Hong Kong	1	8	HK: 100,000	
Ladies First	Released: August 2000; Label: Warner Music Hong Kong	1	2	HK: 130,000	
Love Is...	Released: 28 December 2000; Label: Warner Music Hong Kong	1	—	HK: 140,000	
Shocking Pink	Released: 20 July 2001; Label: Warner Music Hong Kong	1	—	HK: 160,000	IFPI HK: 3× Platinum
Tender (溫柔)	Released: December 2001; Label: Warner Music Hong Kong	1	—	HK: 130,000	
Becoming Sammi	Released: July 2002; Label: Warner Music Hong Kong	1	—		
Wonder Woman	Released: November 2002; Label: Warner Music Hong Kong	—	—		
La La La	Released: February 2004; Label: Warner Music Hong Kong	—	—		
Sammi vs. Sammi	Released: August 2004; Label: Warner Music Hong Kong	1	—		
Faith (信)	Released: December 2009; Label: East Asia Music	1	—	HK: 150,000	
Love is Love	Released: 23 December 2013; Label: Media Asia Music	1	—		
Fabulous	Released: 15 September 2016; Label: Media Asia Music	1	—		
Listen To Mi	Released: 18 August 2021; Label: Media Asia Music	1	—		

=== Mandarin-language studio albums ===
Title	Album details	Peak chart positions	Sales	Certifications
Title	Album details	TWN	Sales	Certifications
Worth It (值得)	Released: 2 September 1996; Label: Warner Music Hong Kong	1	TWN: 700,000; HK: 30,000	RIT: Platinum+Gold
Waiting for You (為你等)	Released: 22 April 1997; Label: Warner Music Hong Kong	3		IFPI HK: Gold
I Deserved (我應該得到)	Released: 10 May 1999; Label: Warner Music Hong Kong	3	Asia: 1,900,000; TWN: 550,000	
To Love (去愛吧)	Released: 5 May 2000; Label: Warner Music Hong Kong	3	Asia: 450,000; HK: 40,000	
Complete (完整)	Released: 7 May 2001; Label: Warner Music Hong Kong	1	TWN: 200,000; HK: 100,000	
Letting Go (捨得)	Released: 12 March 2002; Label: Warner Music Hong Kong	1		
Beautiful Misunderstanding (美麗的誤會)	Released: 31 October 2003; Label: Warner Music Hong Kong	2		
Faith (信者得愛)	Released: 23 June 2010; Label: East Asia Music	1	TWN: 20,000	
Nude (裸)	Released: 14 February 2017; Label: Media Asia Music	1		

== Extended plays ==
Title	Album details
Sammi Cheng 2007 Hong Kong Concert Souvenir Album (鄭秀文Show Mi 07演唱會紀念精裝專輯)	Released: May 2007; Label: East Asia Entertainment
Water of Love (水舞間)	Released: September 2010; Label: East Asia Entertainment

== Compilation albums ==
Title	Album details	Peak chart positions	Sales	Certifications
Title	Album details	HK	Sales	Certifications
The Big Revenge	Released: December 1993; Label: Capital Artists; Language: Cantonese	2		
Time, Location, People	Released: October 1994; Label: Capital Artists; Language: Cantonese	2		
It's time:18 Songs, Old and New	Released:25 October 1995; Label: Capital Artists; Language: Cantonese	1		
Don't Want:17 Songs, Old and New	Released: January 1996; Label: Capital Artists; Language: Cantonese	4		
It's Time@Don't Want:35 Songs, Old and New	Released: March 1996; Label: Capital Artists; Language: Cantonese	—		
Warner Music 24k Compilation Volume One	Released: January 1997; Label: Warner Music Hong Kong; Language: Cantonese/Mandarin	1		IFPI HK: 2× Platinum
Warner Music 24k Compilation Volume Two	Released: January 1998; Label: Warner Music Hong Kong; Language: Cantonese/Mandarin	1		
Dear Sammi Cheng Compilation	Released: July 1998; Label: Warner Music Hong Kong; Language: Cantonese/Mandarin	—		
The Best Remix Compilation	Released: October 1998; Label: Warner Music Hong Kong; Language: Cantonese	—		
Sammi Cheng Compilation	Released: 1999; Label: Warner Music Hong Kong; Language: Cantonese/Mandarin	—		
Arigatou	Released: December 1999; Label: Warner Music Hong Kong; Language: Cantonese	2		
Love Story Compilation	Released: December 1999; Label: Warner Music Hong Kong; Language: Mandarin	—	Asia: 1,200,000	
Overjoyed Mandarin Compilation	Released: November 2000; Label: Warner Music Hong Kong; Language: Mandarin	—		
Warner Music Mastersonic HDCD 34 Songs Essential Collection	Released: May 2001; Label: Warner Music Hong Kong; Language: Cantonese	—		
Personal Selections	Released: August 2001; Label: Capital Arists; Language: Cantonese	—		
Songs and I	Released: 2001; Label: Capital Arists; Language: Cantonese	—		
Sammi Movie Theme Songs Collection	Released: April 18, 2002; Label: Warner Music Hong Kong; Language: Cantonese	—		
Complete Own Sammi Cheng	Released: June 2003; Label: Warner Music Hong Kong; Language: Cantonese/Mandarin	1		
Mi Century: At the Peak – Best of Sammi Cheng	Released: 2004; Label: Warner Music Hong Kong; Language: Mandarin	1		
Sammi Ultimate Collection	Released: September 2006; Label: Warner Music Hong Kong; Language: Cantonese/Mandarin	1		
Sammi Cheng LPCD Mastering Collection	Released: 2008; Label: East Asia Entertainment; Language: Cantonese	20		
True Legend	Released: March 2013; Label: East Asia Entertainment; Language: Mandarin	4		
Miracle Best Collection	Released: December 2014; Label: East Asia Entertainment; Language: Cantonese/Mandarin/English	1		
Unforgettable	Released: April 2016; Label: Warner Music Hong Kong; Language: Cantonese	—		
Believe In Mi	Released: August 2018; Label: Media Asia Music; Language: Cantonese	1		
Concert 96-19 Theme Song Collection	Released: July 2019; Label: Media Asia Music; Language: Cantonese	1		

== Greatest hits albums ==
Title	Album details
Red Hot Hits	Released: September 1992; Label: Capital Artists
Red Hot Hits - '93	Released: October 1993; Label: Capital Artists
Love Hits La La La	Released: 1993; Label: Capital Artists
Made in Heaven	Released: 1997; Label: Capital Artists

== Remix albums ==
Title	Album details
Missing You Remix	Released: 1995; Label: Warner Music Hong Kong; Language: Cantonese
Beware of Women (Kara EP)	Released: 1996; Label: Warner Music Hong Kong; Language: Cantonese
Deep Passion Kara EP Remix	Released: 1996; Label: Warner Music Hong Kong; Language: Cantonese
X Party Remix Kara EP	Released: 1996; Label: Warner Music Hong Kong; Language: Cantonese
SammiX Dance Collection 19 Songs Compilation	Released: 2001; Label: Warner Music Hong Kong; Language: Mandarin
Electricity Party	Released: 2002; Label: Warner Music Hong Kong; Language: Mandarin

== Video albums ==
Title	Album details
捨不捨得	Released: 1996; Label: Warner Music Hong Kong
捨不捨得 Part 2	Released: 1996; Label: Warner Music Hong Kong
Cannot Let Go Karaoke	Released: 1996; Label: Warner Music Hong Kong
Our Theme Song Karaoke Compilation	Released: 1997; Label: Warner Music Hong Kong
The Language of Living Karaoke Compilation	Released: 1998; Label: Warner Music Hong Kong
Heard of Karaoke Compilation	Released: 1999; Label: Warner Music Hong Kong
Arigatou Karaoke Compilation	Released: 2000; Label: Warner Music Hong Kong
Sammi Cheng Karaoke Golden Songs	Released: 2001; Label: Warner Music Hong Kong
Sammi Karaoke Chart-Topping Hits	Released: November 13, 2001; Label: Warner Music Taiwan

== Concert albums ==
Title	Album details	Certifications
Sammi X Live '96	Released: 1997; Label: Warner Music Hong Kong	IFPI HK: Platinum
Sammi Star Show 1997	Released: 1998; Label: Warner Music Hong Kong	IFPI HK: Gold
Sammi i Concert '99	Released: 2000; Label: Warner Music Hong Kong	
Sammi Cheng Live in Taipei	Released: 2001; Label: Warner Music Hong Kong	
Sammi CR903 Music is Live 2001	Released: 2001; Label: Warner Music Hong Kong	
Sammi Shocking Colours 2001 Concert Live	Released: 2002; Label: Warner Music Hong Kong	
Let's Talk About Love Charity Concert	Released: 2002; Label: Warner Music Hong Kong	
Sammi vs Sammi 2004 Concert	Released: 2004; Label: Warner Music Hong Kong	
Show Mi Live	Released: 2007; Label: East Asia Entertainment	
East Asia Capital Artists Concert	Released: 2009; Label: East Asia Entertainment	
Love Mi Live	Released: 2010; Label: East Asia Entertainment	
Sammi Cheng Touch Mi World Tour Live	Released: 2015; Label: Media Asia Entertainment	
Sammi Cheng Touch Mi 2 Live 2016	Released: 2017; Label: Media Asia Entertainment	
Sammi Cheng By My Side Birthday Gig Live	Released: 2018; Label: Media Asia Entertainment	
#FOLLOWMi Live 2019	Released: 2019; Label: Media Asia Entertainment	
Sammi Cheng Listen to Mi Birthday Gig Live	Released: 2022; Label: Media Asia Entertainment	
You & Mi World Tour Live	Released: 2024; Label: Media Asia Entertainment	

== Singles ==
This is a list of all her singles throughout her music career.

Year of album	Album title	Single(s)
1990	Sammi	1. 仍是你; 2. 思念; 3. 離別
1991	Holiday	1. 不來的季節; 2. Valentino; 3. 醉鄉
1992	Never Too Late	1. Say U'll Be Mine; 2. 娃娃看天下; 3. 這夜我不願離開; 4. 2gether
1993	快樂迷宮	1. Chotto等等; 2. 痴心等待; 3. 一水隔天涯; 4. 總算為情認真過; 5. 衝動點唱
1993	大報復	1. 大報復; 2. 叮噹
1994	十誡	1. 十誡; 2. 熱愛島; 3. 薩拉熱窩的羅密歐與茱麗葉; 4. 非一般愛火
1994	時間地點人物	1. 其實心裡有沒有我 (duet with Andy Hui)
1994	失憶	1. 失憶; 2. 苦戀; 3. 給最傷心的人; 4. 達文西的情人
1995	其後	1. 折翼天使; 2. 內心戲; 3. 再見
1995	捨不得你	1. 男仕今天你很好; 2. 捨不得你; 3. 愛的輓歌
1996	放不低	1. 小心女人; 2. 放不低; 3. 不拖不欠
1996	值得	1. 值得
1996	濃情	1. X派對; 2. 默契; 3. 猶豫
1997	為你等	1. 癡癡為你等; 2. 承諾; 3. 念念不忘
1997	我們的主題曲	1. 非男非女; 2. 我們的主題曲
1997	生活語言	1. 星「秀」傳說 (Everyone is a superstar); 2. 親密關係; 3. 表演時間; 4. 忘記巴黎
1998	Feel So Good	1. Feel So Good; 2. 理想對象; 3. 哭泣遊戲
1998	聽聞	1. 祝你快樂; 2. 寵物
1999	我應該得到	1. 缺席; 2. 我應該得到; 3. 出界
1999	很愛很愛	1. 發熱發亮; 2. 插曲; 3. 宿命主義
2000	多謝	1. Arigatou; 2. 失戀有根據
2000	去愛吧	1. 至理名言; 2. 不准哭
2000	眉飛色舞	1. 眉飛色舞
2000	Ladies First	1. 感情線上; 2. Ladies First; 3. 煞科
2000	Ladies First (Taiwan/Singapore Edition)	1. 不傷心; 2. 可能不可能
2000	Love Is...	1. 如何掉眼淚; 2. 獨家試唱; 3. 愛是...
2000	Love Is... Wu Yen Soundtrack AVCD	1. 情無獨鍾
2001	粉紅	1. 醫生與我; 2. 終身美麗; 3. 螢光粉紅
2001	完整	1. 獨一無二; 2. 魅力燃燒
2001	溫柔	1. 交換溫柔; 2. 跳傘; 3. 玻璃鞋
2002	捨得	1. 天衣無縫; 2. 捨得
2002	Becoming	1. 上一次流淚; 2. 心肝命椗
2002	My Left Eye Sees Ghosts Soundtrack	1. 回來我身邊
2002	Wonder Woman	1. 相信自己; 2. 實不相瞞; 3. 神奇女俠
2003	完全擁有鄭秀文	1. 落錯車; 2. 戀上你的床; 3. 大暴走
2003	美麗的誤會	1. 每天愛你少一些; 2. 美麗的誤會
2004	La La La	1. 調情; 2. 世界之最(你願意); 3. 傷
2004	Sammi Vs Sammi	1. 多得他; 2. 喜歡戀愛
2007	鄭秀文07香港演唱會紀念精裝專輯	1. 愛情萬歲; 2. Mi
2008	劍雪	1. 劍雪
2009	Faith 信	1. 有一種快樂; 2. 罪與罰 (Featuring 24HERBS); 3. 信者得愛 (Featuring MC仁); 4. Forgiveness (英) (Featuring 24Herbs)
2009	Hope 望	1. 叮叮噹; 2. 捉迷藏
2010	信者得愛	1. 信者得愛 (國) (Featuring MC HotDog); 2. 罪與罰 (國) (Featuring 吳建豪); 3. 愛 4. 不要驚動愛情 (國); 5. 一步一步愛 (Featuring 陳奐仁)
2011	Feels Like It's Natural	1. Feels Like It's Natural
2011	高海拔之戀II	1.Do Re Mi (國); 2.Do Re Mi (粵)
2014	Miracle Best Collection	1. Bang Bang Bang
2016	Fabulous	1.衝過去; 2.犀利; 3.八公里; 4.我不是歌手; 5.浮雕; 6.Fabulous
2017	裸	1.我就是愛你不害怕

== Cover songs ==
This is a list of all Sammi Cheng's cover songs.

Year of album	Album title	Song title	Original Song	Original Artist
1990	Sammi	思念	夢醒時分	Sarah Chen
1992	Never too late	It's Too Late	It's too late	Carole King
1993	大報復	叮噹	Ding Dong	サザンオールスターズ
1993	快樂迷宮	1. Chotto等等; 2. 衝動點唱	1. チョット; 2. 世界中の誰よりきっと	1. 大黒 摩季; 2. 中山美穗
1994	十誡	1. 十誡; 2. 薩拉熱窩的羅密歐與茱麗葉	1. Shining In The Night; 2. With	1. Katsumi; 2. 中島みゆき
1994	時間地點人物	其實心裡有沒有我 (duet with Andy Hui)	誰說我不在乎	高明駿 / 陳艾湄
1994	失憶	1. 失憶; 2. 苦戀	1. Jewelry Angel; 2. 留什麼給你	1. Access; 2. Sun Nan
1995	捨不得你	愛的輓歌	孤獨の肖像1st	中島みゆき
1997	我們的主題曲	唉聲嘆氣	Un Giorno Senza Te	Laura Pausini
1997	生活語言	纏綿	Move Closer	Phyllis Nelson
1999	聽聞	愛你是我一生中理想	愛妳是我一生的理想	吳國敬
1999	我應該得到	永遠都不夠	Love Springs Eternal	Kurt Darren
1999	很愛很愛	不可多得	I could not ask for more	Edwin McCain
2000	多謝	Arigatou	ありがとう	Kokia
2000	Ladies First	煞科/眉飛色舞	바꿔	Lee Jung Hyun
2001	完整	獨一無二/獨家試唱	와	Lee Jung Hyun
2001	粉紅	She's a Lady	She's a Lady	Tom Jones
2001	溫柔	神化/天衣無縫	너	Lee Jung Hyun
2002	捨得	808	첫사랑	임현정
2002	真的用了心	愛了就算	愛了就算	Jackie Chan / Tarcy Su
2004	Sammi vs Sammi	1. 多得他; 2. 喜歡戀愛(More Than One Words Version); 3. 灰色	1. Superwoman/多得他; 2. 喜歡戀愛; 3. 灰色	1. Karyn White/Faye Wong; 2. Candy Lo; 3. Sandy Lam
2009	Faith 信	1. 信者得愛 (Featuring MC仁); 2. 不要驚動愛情	1. Life Is Good (인생은 즐거워); 2. 不要驚動愛情	1. Jessica H.O. (제시카 H.O.); 2. 高皓正
2013	Love is Love	與神對話	Одиночество	Слава
2018	Believe In Mi	Creo en Mi	Creo en Mi	Natalie Jiménez
