= It's Time: 18 Songs, Old and New =

Compilation album by Sammi Cheng
- Released: 26 October 1995
- Recorded: 1990–1995
- Genre: Pop; dance-pop; ballad
- Length: 1:18:24
- Language: Cantonese
- Label: Capital Artists
- Producer: Mahmood Rumjahn

Sammi Cheng chronology
After (1995)	It's Time: 18 Songs, Old and New (1995)	Can't Let You Go (1995)

Singles from It's time:18 Songs, Old and New
- 1. "Finally Beginning"

It's Time: 18 Songs, Old and New (Cantonese: 是時候新舊對照18首) is the third Cantonese-language compilation album by Hong Kong singer Sammi Cheng, released on 26 October 1995 by Capital Artists, Initially priced at HK$88, The album features 18 tracks in total, including two previously unreleased songs and sixteen singles that had been promoted to radios, TVs, and karaoke bars between 1990 and 1995. The release was met with strong response, debuting at number one on the IFPI Top 10 Albums Sales Chart and ultimately accumulating sales surpassing double platinum. In November 1996, Capital Artists’ general manager Ng Yu acknowledged that although Cheng had already left Capital Artists,her compilations had generated substantial revenue.

== Background and promotion ==
In September 1995, Cheng officially signed with Warner Music Group . One month after Cheng's departure from Capital Artists, Capital Artists’ general manager Ng Yu, noting her renewed surge in popularity. In response, the label released It's time:18 Songs, Old and New.On the day of the album's release, promotional advertisements appeared in major newspapers and magazines.

== Singles ==
In Hong Kong,"Finally Beginning" was chosen as the album's promotional single,It intended solely for karaoke bars.

== Accolades ==
Publication	Accolade	Ref.
Apple Daily	Top Ten Best‑Selling Albums Selected by Record Distributors	

== Commercial performance ==
It's time:18 Songs, Old and New debuted at number one on IFPI (Hong Kong Group), and stayed there for six weeks.

== Track listing ==
Credits adapted from the album's liner notes.

It's time:18 Songs, Old and New – Hong Kong Standard edition
No.	Title	Music	Original album	Length
1.	"Finally Beginning"	Mahmood Rumjahn	Previously unreleased	4:36
2.	"It's Time to End"	Mahmood Rumjahn	Previously unreleased	4:16
3.	"Memory loss"		Sammi（1994）	4:43
4.	"Love Hurt So Much"		Sammi（1994）	4:11
5.	"Time, Place, Person"		Time, Place, Person	3:51
6.	"Romeo and Juliet in Sarajevo"		Ten Commandments	4:23
7.	"The Fire Island"		Ten Commandments	4:07
8.	"Ten Commandments"		Ten Commandments	4:03
9.	"Big Revenge"	C. Y. Kong	Big Revenge	3:23
10.	"Ding Dong"		Big Revenge	4:12
11.	"At Last, I’ve Taken Love Seriously"		Sammi Cheng's Happy Maze	4:12
12.	"Devotedly Waiting"		Sammi Cheng's Happy Maze	4:20
13.	"Doll's View of the World"		Never Too Late	4:28
14.	"Say U'll Be Mine"	Dave Pickel; John Dexter	Never Too Late	4:23
15.	"Love Lost in Vienna"	Gary Benson; Frank Wildhorn	Holiday	5:37
16.	"The Season That Never Came"		Holiday	4:54
17.	"Miss You"		Sammi（1990）	4:06
18.	"Goodbye"		After	4:40
Total length:				1:18:24

== Charts ==
Chart (1995)	Peak position
Hong Kong Albums (IFPI)	1

== Release history ==
List of formats and editions of the album being released in each country, along with the date of the release
Country	Date	Format	Catalogue no./Barcode and Other Identifiers	Label	Edition	Ref.
Hong Kong	26 October 1995	CD	CD-22-1194	Capital Artists	Hong Kong Edition	
Hong Kong	26 October 1995	cassette	CAL-22-1194C	Capital Artists	Hong Kong Edition	
Malaysia	November 1995	CD		Capital Artists	Malaysian Edition	
Malaysia	November 1995	cassette		Capital Artists	Malaysian Edition	
