= Lori Chow =

Hong Kong-Canadian model, actress, and singer (born 1988)

- Born: Lorretta Chow; 10 July 1988 (age 38); Vancouver, British Columbia, Canada
- Citizenship: Canada
- Occupations: Actress; fashion model; singer
- Years active: 2007–present

Chinese name
Transcriptions
Standard Mandarin
- Hanyu Pinyin: Zhōu Měixīn
Yue: Cantonese
- Jyutping: Zau1 Mei5 Jan1

Lorretta "Lori" Chow (born 10 July 1988) is a Hong Kong-Canadian fashion model, actress and singer active in the Hong Kong entertainment industry. She was the second runner-up at the 2007 Miss Hong Kong Pageant and a former managed TVB artist. She released her debut single, "Discreet" (不失禮) in August 2013.

In 2015, she was picked to be a contestant on the third season of Asia's Next Top Model.

== Filmography ==
Film
Year	Film	Role	Notes
2009	Turning Point	Brother One's girlfriend	
2013	Selling Memories		
2018	A Beautiful Moment		
Television
Year	Title	Role	Notes
2010	Fly with Me	Model	Cameo
2010	Every Move You Make	Wu Hau-ying	Supporting Actress
2015	Asia's Next Top Model (season 3)	Herself	Contestant; finished 11th/10th place

== Singing ==
Chow won the Fairchild TV New Talent Singing Awards Vancouver Audition in 2005 and represented Vancouver at the New Talent Singing Awards International Championship that year and garnered the "Most Trendy Image Award". She sang the ending theme song, "You Are My Angel" for Forensic Heroes II.

Chow has also participated in the Composers and Authors Society of Hong Kong (CASH) Song Writers Quest in both 2009, 2010, and 2012 as an Artist Singer. She was an Artist Singer for 風的期待 in 2009 and was awarded 2nd runner up, for 癡呆 in 2010, and 假使有日被忘記 for which she was awarded 1st runner up in 2012.

== Awards ==
- 2005 New Talent Singing Awards Vancouver Audition–Winner
- 2005 TVB8 International Chinese New Talent Singing Championship–Best Image Award
- 2007 Miss Hong Kong Pageant–Second runner-up
- 2007 Miss Hong Kong Pageant–Most Attractive Legs Award

Awards and achievements
Miss Hong Kong
Preceded by Koni Lui 呂慧儀	Miss Hong Kong 2nd Runner-Up; 2007	Succeeded by Sire Ma 馬賽
