= Sammi (album) =

Studio album by Sammi Cheng
- Released: October 1990
- Recorded: March 1990 – August 1990
- Genres: Pop; Canto-pop; ballad
- Length: 42:03
- Language: Cantonese
- Label: Capital Artists
- Producers: Alvin Kwok, C.Y. Kong

Sammi Cheng chronology
| Sammi (1990) | Holiday (1991) |

Singles from Sammi
- 1. "Miss You"; 2. "Loving You Still"; 3. "Fascination"

Sammi (Cantonese: 鄭秀文) is the debut Cantonese-language studio album by Hong Kong singer Sammi Cheng, released in October 1990 by Capital Artists. The album marked Cheng’s official entry into the Hong Kong music industry and showcased her fresh image and vocal talent. It blends of heartfelt ballads and pop tracks laid the foundation for her future success. Shortly after its release, the album was certified Gold, with total sales reaching 30,000 copies—a respectable achievement for a newcomer. In addition, this album earned Cheng the "Outstanding Newcomer" award at the 1990 RTHK Top 10 Gold Songs Awards.

== Background ==
In 1988, at the age of fifteen and a half, Sammi Cheng participated in the 7th New Talent Singing Awards organized by TVB, where she won the bronze prize and subsequently signed a contract with Capital Artists. At the time, Cheng was still a Form 4 student and thus had no immediate plans to release an album, instead recording the radio drama "We Grew This Way" for Commercial Radio Hong Kong. In December 1988, she was arranged to record two songs—"Cherish This Moment" (珍惜這一刻) and "Chrysanthemum Tears" (菊花淚)—with David Lui for the television drama series Deadly Secret.In 1990, Cheng officially began her solo music career, releasing her debut single "Miss You" (思念) in May of the same year. The song received a positive response and became popular at karaoke bars. Her self-titled debut album was then released in October 1990.

== Composition ==
Sammi Cheng's debut 1990 album mainly features Canto-pop with a mix of pop ballads and mid-tempo tracks, including some covers of English and Japanese songs. At the time, there was a shortage of musical talent in Hong Kong, so most of the songs were adaptations. The only original composition was "Fascination," composed by Peter Lam, which is considered Sammi Cheng’s first true solo work.

== Promotion ==
Due to being a newcomer, there was no significant budget or resources. Only a small number of album advertisements appeared in magazines and newspapers, or through magazine interviews such as Hong Kong’s "Music Bus," to promote the album. Sammi mainly promoted it on television programs. For singles, promotion was primarily carried out on several TV shows or events . In June 1990, Sammi Cheng promoted her debut single "Miss You" on the Hong Kong TV program "Enjoy Yourself Tonight." In October of the same year, she promoted her third single "Fascination" on the same show, receiving encouragement and praise from the hosts for her attractive appearance and sweet voice.

== Singles ==
In Hong Kong, three singles were released from the album. The lead single, "Miss You" (思念), peaked at number eight on a major chart and reached number one on the karaoke bar chart. The second single was "Loving You Still" (仍是你), followed by the third single, "Fascination" (迷情), which peaked at number seven on a major chart.

=== Singles charts ===
the highest rank achieved by the released single
| Single | 903 | RTHK | 997 | TVB |
| Miss You | 16 | — | / | 8 |
| Loving You Still | 20 | — | / | — |
| Fascination | — | — | / | 7 |

== Accolades ==
| Publication | Accolade | Ref. |
|---|---|---|
| 1990 RTHK Top 10 Gold Songs Awards | Outstanding Newcomer | |

== Track listing ==
Credits adapted from the album's liner notes.

Sammi – Hong Kong Standard edition
| No. | Title | Writer(s) | Length |
|---|---|---|---|
| 1. | "Loving You Still" | | 3:26 |
| 2. | "Vibrant Dance Song" | | 4:34 |
| 3. | "Miss You" | | 4:09 |
| 4. | "Burning Dreams" | | 5:29 |
| 5. | "Disillusion" | | 3:25 |
| 6. | "Fascination" | Peter Lam | 4:25 |
| 7. | "Farewell" | | 4:09 |
| 8. | "The Most Beautiful Moment" | | 3:56 |
| 9. | "Awaited Promise" | | 4:25 |
| 10. | "Youthful Visitor" | | 4:07 |
| Total length: | | | 42:03 |

== Release history ==
List of formats and editions of the album being released in each country, along with the date of the release
| Country | Date | Format | Catalogue no./Barcode and other identifiers | Label | Edition | Ref. |
|---|---|---|---|---|---|---|
| Hong Kong | October 1990 | CD | CD-22-1098 | Capital Artists | Hong Kong Edition | |
| Hong Kong | October 1990 | cassette | CAL-22-1098C | Capital Artists | Hong Kong Edition | |
| Hong Kong | October 1990 | Vinyl | CAL-22-1098 | Capital Artists | Hong Kong Edition | |
| Malaysia | October 1990 | cassette | | | Malaysian Edition | |
| Singapore | October 1990 | cassette | | | Singaporean Edition | |
| Taiwan | 1990 | cassette | CAL-22-1098C | Fancy Pie | Taiwanese Edition | |
| Hong Kong | 1994 | CD | | Capital Artists | Reissue | |
| Hong Kong | July 15, 2011 | CD | EACD659 | East Asia Music | Capital Artists 40th Anniversary Reissue Series (Gold Disc) | |
