= Cindy Cheung =

Cindy Cheung may refer to:

- Cindy Cheung (actress) (born 1970), Chinese American actress
- Cindy Cheung (television presenter) (born 1984), Chinese Canadian TV host
