= Benny Yau =

Chinese actor and singer

- Born: Benny Shui Hang Yau; 8 May 1980 (age 45); Hong Kong
- Occupation(s): television presenter, singer, actor, cruise director
- Years active: 1999–present
- Awards: New Talent Singing Awards – Vancouver Audition 2000 First Runner-up

Chinese name
- Traditional Chinese: 邱穟恆
- Simplified Chinese: 邱穟恒
Transcriptions
Standard Mandarin
- Hanyu Pinyin: Qiū Suìhéng
Yue: Cantonese
- Jyutping: Jau1 Seoi6 Hang4
- Musical career
- Origin: Vancouver, British Columbia, Canada
- Genres: Pop, Classical, Dance
- Member of: The WestCoast Players (2015–)

Benny Yau (Traditional Chinese: 邱穟恆), born 8 May 1980 is a Canadian television presenter, singer, and actor known for hosting What's On on Fairchild TV, and as the lead singer of the band The WestCoast Players.

== Career ==
Yau entered a DJ competition in May 1999 for a Vancouver Chinese radio station CHMB AM 1320 (華僑之聲) and placed fourth. He then entered the station in hopes of becoming a successful radio DJ. He was set to host a weekly late night music program in September 1999. However, within weeks of those plans being made, they were put on hold by the station indefinitely.

Yau entered the New Talent Singing Awards Vancouver Audition 2000 (新秀歌唱大賽溫哥華選拔賽2000) organized by Fairchild Television, and was garnered first runner-up with the songs Palm (掌心) by No Name Brand (無印良品) and Con te partirò by Andrea Bocelli. He was later approached by Fairchild Television producers to co-host the infotainment program, "What's On (熒幕八爪娛)". Since then, Yau has gone on to become Master of Ceremonies at many of Fairchild Television's live events. In 2007, Yau was part of the judging panel at the auditions and semi-finals of the New Talent Singing Awards Vancouver Audition, coming full circle from contestant to judge of the same contest.

In December 2009, Yau announced on his Twitter account that he is no longer affiliated with Fairchild TV. Since then, Yau can be seen hosting live events for charities such as Canadian Cancer Society. In 2011, he was invited to co-host The Price Is Right Live! with Joey Fatone at River Rock Casino Resort.

In 2015, Yau became one of the frontpersons of the dance music band The WestCoast Players. And in 2016, Yau became an entertainment host for Princess Cruises on board their Asian cruise line, later becoming a cruise director.

== Personal life ==
Yau was born in Hong Kong, and immigrated with his family to Vancouver, Canada in 1988. Yau is a graduate of Eric Hamber Secondary School in 1998 with the distinction of Top Music Department Graduate. He later studied Classical Voice at Vancouver Community College under the instruction of Bruce Pullan. During his high school days, Yau was a competitive swimmer. Yau is an avid collector of Amiibo figurines, and is a fan of the Pokémon franchise.

== Selected works ==
=== Television ===
- Princess Cruises The Wake Show – Presenter/Host (2016–present)
- BC Children's Hospital Miracle Weekend Telethon – Master of Ceremonies (2004, 2007, 2008, 2009)
- Mr. Sing Searches For Stars (Sing仔尋星) – Sing仔 (2006)
- New Talent Singing Awards Vancouver Audition – Semi-finals Master of Ceremonies (2005, 2006)
- Angling Unlimited (漁樂無窮) – Host (2001)
- What's On – Host (2000–2002)

=== Live events ===
- Canadian Cancer Society's The Monopoly Affair – Vancouver – Master of Ceremonies (2016, 2019)
- The Price Is Right Live! – Co-Host (2011)
- Canadian Cancer Society Galaxy of Hope Fundraising Gala – Master of Ceremonies (2005, 2010)
- Hong Kong TVB Fans Party – Vancouver Stop – Master of Ceremonies (2008)
- New Talent Singing Awards Vancouver Audition – Semi-finals Judge (2007, 2008)
- Miss Chinese (Vancouver) Pageant – Guest performer (2002, 2007)
