= Vincy Chan =

Hong Kong-Singaporean musical artist (born 1982)

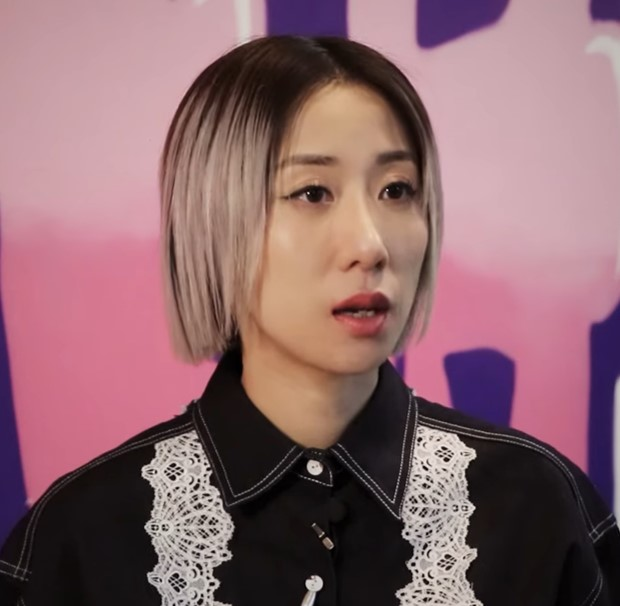
- Chan interviewing by am730 in February 2022.
- Born: Chan Ka Yan (陳家欣); 16 October 1982 (age 43); Hong Kong
- Education: Dunman High School, Nanyang Technological University
- Occupation: Singer
- Years active: 2006 - Present

Chinese name
- Traditional Chinese: 泳兒
- Simplified Chinese: 泳儿
Transcriptions
Standard Mandarin
- Hanyu Pinyin: Yǒng'ér
Yue: Cantonese
- Yale Romanization: Wihng Yì
- Jyutping: Wing6 Ji4

Chan Ka Yan
- Traditional Chinese: 陳家欣
- Simplified Chinese: 陈家欣
Transcriptions
Standard Mandarin
- Hanyu Pinyin: Chén Jiāxīn
- Musical career
- Origin: Hong Kong
- Genres: Cantopop
- Instrument: Vocals
- Label: Emperor Entertainment Group
- Website: Vincy Chan's Official Website

Chan Ka Yan (born 16 October 1982), better known as Vincy Chan is a Hong Kong-Singaporean Cantopop singer. She began her singing career after winning 1st runner up at the 2005 New Talent Singing Awards and has since been signed with Emperor Entertainment Group. Her best known songs include "Feeling" (感應) and "My Memories are Not My Own" (我的回憶不是我的).

== Biography ==
Born in Hong Kong, Chan immigrated with her family to Singapore in 1990. She attended Dunman High School in her teens and graduated from Nanyang Technological University with a degree in accounting in 2005. Upon graduating, Chan entered Project Superstar, a singing competition in Singapore and was placed among the top 24 contestants. More substantially, she returned to Hong Kong and won first runner-up and the award for "Best Style" at the 2005 New Talent Singing Awards which led to her being signed by Emperor Entertainment Group.

== Career ==
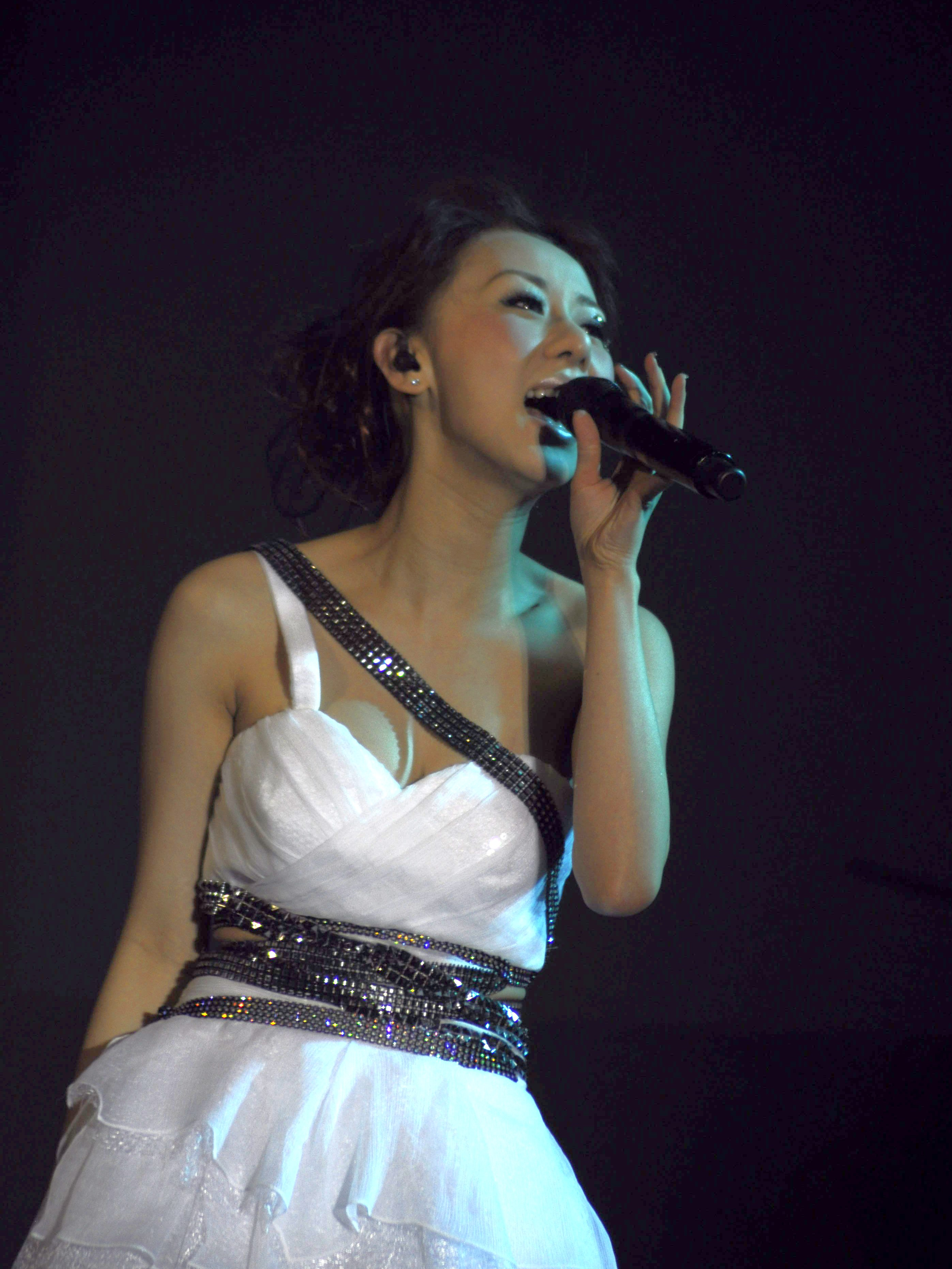
Chan attending her solo concert at Hall 3G of the Hong Kong Convention and Exhibition Centre on 25 June 2009

Chan launched her solo career in 2006 with the debut single, "Feeling" (感應), for which she quickly gained popularity. She was promoted by her record company early on as a "successor to Joey Yung" and her vocals often drew her comparisons to early R&B era Faye Wong. She was widely successful as a newcomer, sweeping awards at all 4 major year-end music award shows. This included a Top 10 Gold Song Award at RTHK for "Feeling," which remains one of her signature tunes to this day.

In 2012-13, Chan released a couple of electronic albums collaborating with People Mountain Sea, the music production company founded by Anthony Wong, who was among her earliest champions. "Electrify" (通電), the lead single to the album I am Free (我自在), was widely praised by DJs at Commercial Radio Hong Kong at the time, and reached number 2 on their singles chart.

On February 14, 2015, her first ticket-purchasing concert "Love. Love Song Swimming Er Concert" was held at the Opera House of the Hong Kong Academy for Performing Arts. A large number of people from entertainment industry were invited to view the event. In the same year, the second solo cover HI-FI audiophile disc "Feng·Love Song" was released, leading Vincy Chan to win the "IFPI Hong Kong Record Sales Award" and "Top Ten Selling Mandarin Records" for the second time. Due to the disc she won the "Best Performing Female Singer" and "New Town Madden Awards Ceremony" and "New Town Madden Asian Singer" for the first time.

Vincy Chan released a new Cantonese song at the end of 2015. She sang OST for "Wu Shuangpu" named "Unique", YouTube views up to more than 1 million, extremely Word-of-mouth recognition has enabled Vincy Chan to win the "Jing Ge Golden Melody Award" for the third time.

In 2016, Vincy Chan finally released the new title song "Four Not Like" in February, becoming Vincy Chan's third "Three Channel Champion Song". The number of YouTube views reached more than 2 million and the response was satisfactory. The new album "Mirror Image" included new songs. And cover singing, the new song part will still be recorded with the equipment used to make the cover album. In the end, Yong Er won the "Best Performing Female Singer" in the "Golden Song Awards Ceremony".

In 2017, Vincy Chan launched her first solo EP "Short Stories" since she joined the industry for 12 years. The first title "A Little Pig" and the second title "Lullaby" (sung with Li Ruien) were both composed by Christopher Chak. The third major hit "Habits to Love You" made Wing Er win the "Golden Song Award" for the fourth time in the "Golden Song Award Ceremony". The English song "You Are My Sunshine" launched at the end of the year has over 1 million YouTube views.

In 2018, Vincy Chan released her third solo cover HI-FI fever disc "Fever". In April, she released the new title song "Riding a Horse", winning the eighth time of "New Town Madden Awards Ceremony" and "New Town Madden Songs" and the fifth time "Arena Golden Melody Awards Ceremony" ". In the end, she won the "Fifth Cantonese Song Ranking Award Ceremony" "Most Popular Female Singer".

In 2019, Vincy Chan launched 3 new Guangdong title songs with the theme of "Flower Series", among which, "Wild Mulan" won Yong Er the "Jing Ge Golden Melody Award" for the sixth time in the "Jing Ge Golden Melody Award". In addition to holding his first mainland solo concert "Re-sensing Vincy Chan Concert" in Dongguan on June 22, Vincy Chan also held "Renewal" on October 16 at KITEC StarHall, Kowloon Bay International Exhibition and Trade Center, Hong Kong. Induction Swimming's Concert. Finally, with the excellent reputation of the concert, she won the "New Town Madden Awards Ceremony" for the first time and "The Madden I Support Singer". In the same year, she invested in a six-figure small business and cooperated with a Swedish brand to launch her own brand of earrings.

== Discography ==
=== Studio albums ===
- 2006: Vincy (感應)
- 2007: Flowers without Snow (花無雪)
- 2007: Close to You
- 2008: Really Want To Know You (多想認識你)
- 2008: Pieces of V
- 2009: More Vincy (多一點 泳兒)
- 2009: Vincy's Precious (私人珍藏)
- 2010: Foresee?... Encountered (預見? ...遇見。)
- 2011: Happy Tears (快樂眼淚)
- 2011: Almost An Open Secret (半公開的秘密)
- 2012: Where I Touch The Sky (接近天空的地方)
- 2013: Free (我自在)
- 2014: Love & Love Songs (愛.情歌)
- 2015: Love In The Wind (風.情歌)
- 2016: Mirror Reflection (鏡像)
- 2018: Fever
- 2022: Dark Light of the Soul

=== EPs ===
- 2017: Short Stories

=== Compilations ===
- 2010: Vin'Selection (New + Best Selections)

=== Live albums ===
- 2008: Vincy, Close to You Live (泳兒 Close To You Live 音樂會)
- 2009: (Vincy唱泳音樂世界Live)
- 2012: Neway Music Live x Vincy (Neway Music Live X 泳兒音樂會)
- 2015: Love Songs, Vincy Live 2015 (愛情歌 泳兒音樂會)

== Concerts ==
Concerts	Date	Venue & Location	No. of Shows	Notes
S.U.C.C.E.S.S. Charity Gala	25 February 2007	Vancouver, BC	1	
Vincy Close to You Live Concert (泳兒 Close To You Live 音樂會)	27 November 2007	Star Hall, Hong Kong	1	
New Talent Singing Awards Auditions	21–22 June 2008	Toronto, ON & Calgary, AB	2	
Neway Music Live x Vincy (Neway Music Live X 泳兒)	30 October 2011	KITEC, Hong Kong	1	
Vincy Live 2015 (愛.情歌 泳兒音樂會)	14 February 2015	HKAPA Lyric Theatre, Hong Kong	1	
Love Chapter Concert (泳兒10周年LOVE CHAPTER演唱會)	27 October 2016	KITEC, Hong Kong	1	10th Anniversary Concert
VINCY CHAN BREAKING LIVE 2022	02 October 2022	STAR HALL @ KITEC	1	

== Filmography ==
=== Films ===
- A Beautiful Moment (2018)
- The Midas Touch (2013)
- 72 Tenants of Prosperity (2010)
- Split Second Murders (2009)
- Naraka 19 (2007)

=== Television series ===
- Stars Academy (2021–2022)
- The Sound of Talents (2025)

== Awards ==
- 2005
  - New Talent Singing Awards - 1st Runner-up
  - New Talent Singing Awards - Best Style Award
- 2006
  - TVB8 Mandarin Music On Demand Awards Presentation - Best Female Newcomers (Bronze)
  - Metro Radio Hit Music Awards 2006 - Hit Female Newcomers
  - Metro Radio Hit Music Awards 2006 - Hit Songs: "Feeling" (感應)
  - Jade Solid Gold Best 10 Awards Presentation - Most Popular Newcomers (Gold)
  - Ultimate Song Chart Awards 2006 - Ultimate Newcomers (Gold)
  - RTHK 29th Top Ten Chinese Gold Songs Award - Top 10 Gold Songs: "Feeling" (感應)
  - RTHK 29th Top Ten Chinese Gold Songs Award - Most Promising Newcomers (Gold)
- 2007
  - Four Stations Joint Media Awards - Breakthrough Artists (Gold)
  - Metro Radio Hit Music Awards 2007 - Hit Songs: "Flowers without Snow" (花無雪)
  - Metro Radio Hit Music Awards 2007 - Hit Favourite Singers
  - Jade Solid Gold Best 10 Awards Presentation - Gold Song Award: "No Heart for Singing" (無心戀唱)
- 2008
  - Metro Radio Hit Music Awards 2008 - Hit Songs: "Let the World Look at Me" (世界請看着我)
  - Metro Radio Hit Music Awards 2008 - Hit Vocal Performances
  - Four Stations Joint Media Awards - Breakthrough Artists (Silver)
  - RTHK 31st Top Ten Chinese Gold Songs Award - Excellent Mandarin Song Award: (喜歡一個人好累)
- 2009
  - TVB8 Mandarin Music On Demand Awards Presentation - Gold Song Award: (你的承諾) with Ocean Hai
  - Metro Radio Hit Music Awards 2009 - Hit Songs: "A Single Stroke" (一撇)
  - Metro Radio Hit Music Awards 2009 - Hit Karaoke Songs: "A Single Stroke" (一撇)
  - Metro Radio Hit Music Awards 2009 - Hit Choral Songs: "My Memories are not Mine" (我的回憶不是我的) with Ocean Hai
  - Jade Solid Gold Best 10 Awards Presentation - Most Popular Chinese Song Award (Bronze): (明天以後) with Raymond Lam
  - Jade Solid Gold Best 10 Awards Presentation - Most Popular Choral Song Award (Gold): "My Memories are not Mine" (我的回憶不是我的) with Ocean Hai
  - RTHK 32nd Top Ten Chinese Gold Songs Award - Top 10 Gold Songs: "My Memories are not Mine" (我的回憶不是我的) with Ocean Hai
- 2010
  - Metro Radio Hit Music Awards 2010 - Hit Songs: (無緣罪)
  - Metro Radio Hit Music Awards 2010 - Hit Karaoke Songs: (無緣罪)
- 2011
  - Metro Radio Hit Music Awards 2011 - Hit Songs: "Who Will Love Me?" (有誰來愛我)
- 2012
  - Metro Radio Hit Music Awards 2012 - The Most Breakthrough Singer Voted By Music Fans Across The Country Award
- 2013
  - Metro Radio Hit Music Awards 2013 - Hit Songs: "Electrify" (通電)
- 2014
  - Metro Radio Hit Music Awards 2014 - Hit Mandarin Karaoke Songs: "Wishing Upon a Star" (星語心願)
  - Metro Radio Hit Music Awards 2014 - Hit Vocal Performances
  - Metro Radio Hit Music Awards 2014 - Hit Popular Jazz Singers
  - RTHK 37th Top Ten Chinese Gold Songs Award - Excellent Mandarin Song Award (Silver): "Ordinary Friends" (普通朋友)
  - Jade Solid Gold Best 10 Awards Presentation - Best Adapted Songs Award: "Wishing Upon a Star" (星語心願)
  - Jade Solid Gold Best 10 Awards Presentation - Gold Song Award: "Wishing Upon a Star" (星語心願)
- 2015
  - Jade Solid Gold Best 10 Awards Presentation - Best Female Vocal Performance Award
  - Metro Radio Hit Music Awards 2015 - Hit Asia Singers
  - Metro Radio Hit Music Awards 2015 - Hit Hi-Fi Music Album: "Wind·Love Songs" (風·情歌)
  - Metro Radio Hit Music Awards 2015 - Hit Jazz Singers
- 2016
  - Jade Solid Gold Best 10 Awards Presentation - Best Female Vocal Performance Award
  - Jade Solid Gold Best 10 Awards Presentation - Gold Song Award: "One & Only" (獨一無二)
- 2017
  - Jade Solid Gold Best 10 Awards Presentation - Gold Song Award: (習慣愛你)
- 2018
  - Jade Solid Gold Best 10 Awards Presentation - Gold Song Award: (騎膊馬)
  - Metro Radio Hit Music Awards 2018 - Hit Songs: "Bloody Warmth" (騎膊馬)
- 2019
  - Jade Solid Gold Best 10 Awards Presentation - Gold Song Award: "Wild Magnolia" (野木蘭)
  - Metro Radio Hit Music Awards 2019 - Hit "I Support" Singers
- 2020
  - Jade Solid Gold Best 10 Awards Presentation - Gold Song Award: "Gutters" (溝渠暢泳)
  - Jade Solid Gold Best 10 Awards Presentation - Outstanding Singer of the Year
  - Metro Radio Hit Music Awards 2020 - Hit Vocal Performances: "Gutters" (溝渠暢泳)
  - RTHK 43th Top Ten Chinese Gold Songs Award - Top 10 Gold Songs: "Gutters" (溝渠暢泳)
- 2021
  - ViuTV Chill Club Music Awards Presentation - Top 10 songs: "Gutters" (溝渠暢泳)
  - Metro Radio Hit Music Awards 2021 - Hit Songs: "Sea of Thorns" (荊棘海)
  - Metro Radio Hit Music Awards 2021 - Metro Hit Female Singers
  - Ultimate Song Chart Awards 2021 - Top 10 Songs of the Year (10th): "Sea of Thorns" (荊棘海)
  - Hong Kong Gold Songs Award Presentation Ceremony 2021/2022 - Top 10 Gold Songs: "Sea of Thorns" (荊棘海)
- 2022
  - Metro Radio Hit Music Awards 2022 - Hit Songs: "Bloody Warmth" (早上37.2度)
  - Metro Radio Hit Music Awards 2022 - Metro Hit Female Singers
  - Ultimate Song Chart Awards 2022 - Ultimate Female Singers (Silver)
  - RTHK 95th Anniversary Top Ten Chinese Gold Songs Award - Top 10 Gold Songs: "Glacier" (葉落冰川)
  - RTHK 95th Anniversary Top Ten Chinese Gold Songs Award - Outstanding Singer Award
  - RTHK 95th Anniversary Top Ten Chinese Gold Songs Award - Best Chinese Album Award (Female Singer): Dark Light Of The Soul
- 2023
  - Metro Radio Hit Music Awards 2023 - Hit Songs: "Once and for all" (一了百了)
  - Metro Radio Hit Music Awards 2023 - Metro Hit Female Singers
  - RTHK 45th Top Ten Chinese Gold Songs Award - Outstanding Singer Award
- 2024
  - Metro Radio Hit Music Awards 2024 - Hit Songs: "Ride It Out"
  - Metro Radio Hit Music Awards 2024 - Metro Hit Female Singers (Bronze)
  - RTHK 46th Top Ten Chinese Gold Songs Award - Outstanding Singer Award
- 2025
  - Metro Radio Hit Music Awards 2025 - Hit Mandarin Songs (Bronze): "The Old Man and the Sea" (老人與海) with Ocean Hai
  - Metro Radio Hit Music Awards 2025 - Hit Songs: "Sugar Free" (無糖可樂)
  - Metro Radio Hit Music Awards 2025 - Metro Hit Female Singers (Bronze)
  - Ultimate Song Chart Awards 2025 - Top 10 Songs of the Year (4th): "Sugar Free" (無糖可樂)
  - RTHK 47th Top Ten Chinese Gold Songs Award - Outstanding Singer Award
