= New Talent Singing Awards Vancouver Audition =

New Talent Singing Awards Vancouver Audition (Chinese: 新秀歌唱大賽溫哥華選拔賽) or NTSA Vancouver for short, is an annual singing contest organized by Fairchild Television in Vancouver, held every July. The winner of the contest will represent the city of Vancouver in the NTSA International Finals, usually held in Hong Kong, organized by TVB.

== Contest format ==
=== Original Format: Regional - North America - Hong Kong ===
From its start in 1994, 15 finalists (12 finalists from 1996 onwards) competed in NTSA Vancouver for the top 2 spots. Those two contestants will then enter the NTSA North American Finals. 12 to 15 regional winners (and some runners-up) from Canada and the US would compete for the title of North American champion. The North American champion would then compete as the "overseas contestant" in the NTSA Finals in Hong Kong.

=== International Event: Regional - Canada - International ===
With the emergence of several Australian, European and Asian cities like Melbourne, London, Amsterdam and Shanghai wanting to be included in the event, in 1997, TVB Hong Kong created the NTSA International Finals. Instead of having one "overseas contestant" from North America competing in the NTSA Finals (now renamed the NTSA Hong Kong Regional Finals), now each participating country would send regional representatives to compete in the NTSA International Finals (much like an international beauty pageant would).

With that, the North American Finals were cancelled starting that year. Fairchild TV continued to host the NTSA Canadian Finals to search for National representatives while the American cities just sent their regional winners directly to the NTSA International Finals.

In the NTSA Canadian Finals, representatives from 7 Canadian cities (Toronto and Vancouver always sent two representatives while other cities: Calgary, Edmonton, Winnipeg, Victoria and either Ottawa or Montreal sent one) would compete for the top 3 places, which would give them the opportunity to represent Canada and their city in the NTSA International Finals.

=== New Century, New Format: Regional - International ===
In 2000, Fairchild TV decided to scrap the NTSA Canadian Finals, and have one representative from each of the three cities that Fairchild TV is based in: Vancouver, Toronto, and Calgary (although sometimes Calgary and Edmonton would combine to produce one contestant representing Alberta) to compete in the NTSA International Finals. Since this was the case, the winner of the regional competitions in those cities would directly enter the International Finals. The same year, Fairchild TV Vancouver decided to reduce the number of finalists from 12 to 8, making the competition extremely intense. The number of finalists temporarily increased back to 12 in 2007, but dropped back to 8 finalists in 2008.

== Contest venues ==
NTSA Vancouver is one of the two big annual productions for Fairchild Television Vancouver (the other being Miss Chinese (Vancouver) Pageant) and has been held at many state-of-the-art venues.

- 1994 Orpheum Theatre
- 1995 Gateway Theatre
- 1996 Plaza of Nations Outdoor Stage
- 1997 Tom Lee Music Theatre
- 1998 Plaza of Nations Indoor Glass Dome
- 1999 Radisson Hotel Ballroom
- 2000 Plaza of Nations Indoor Glass Dome
- 2001 Plaza of Nations Indoor Glass Dome
- 2002 Plaza of Nations Outdoor Stage
- 2003 The Centre in Vancouver for Performing Arts
- 2004 The Centre in Vancouver for Performing Arts
- 2005 The Centre in Vancouver for Performing Arts
- 2006 Chan Shun Concert Hall at Chan Centre for the Performing Arts
- 2007 The Centre in Vancouver for Performing Arts
- 2008 The Centre in Vancouver for Performing Arts
- 2009 The Centre in Vancouver for Performing Arts
- 2010 River Rock Show Theatre at River Rock Casino Resort
- 2011 River Rock Show Theatre at River Rock Casino Resort
- 2012 River Rock Show Theatre at River Rock Casino Resort

== Special performing guests ==
Faichild TV would sometimes hire Asian singers or local artists to be the Special Guest(s) performing in the finals.

- 1994 No Special Guest
- 1995 Liz Kong 江希文
- 1996 Karen Tong 湯寶如 (1991 NTSA Top 5)
- 1997 No Special Guest
- 1998 Kenneth Wong 黃君諾 (1995 NTSA Vancouver Winner), Daniel Kwan 關浩正 (1996 NTSA Vancouver Winner), Phillip Lau 劉健濤 (1997 NTSA Vancouver Winner)
- 1999 No Special Guest
- 2000 Gabriel Harrison 海俊傑 (1994 NTSA Winner)
- 2001 Fei Fei Ding 丁菲飛
- 2002 JanaJana
- 2003 Brenda Lo 盧業瑂, Annabelle Louie 雷安娜, Albert Lui 雷有曜 (of the band 太極 Tai Chi)
- 2004 Pansy Lau 劉鳳屏, Thelma Leung 梁聖子, William Ho 何活權
- 2005 Wilfred Lau 劉浩龍 (1997 NTSA International Winner)
- 2006 Niki Chow 周麗淇
- 2007 Stephanie Cheng 鄭融
- 2008 Kay Tse 謝安琪
- 2009 Tat Dik 狄易達, JJ Jia 賈曉晨
- 2010 Prince@Lollipop 邱勝翊（王子）, Xiao Jie@Lollipop 廖俊傑（小傑）
- 2011 Jonathan Wong 王梓軒
- 2012 Ivana Wong 王菀之

== Major award winners ==
Year	Winner	1st Runner-Up	2nd Runner-Up	Golden Voice Award	Best Stage Performance Award
1994	13. Angus Ting 丁文俊	6. Stacia Lau 劉思瑤	Hang-Kit Leung 梁恆傑	No Award	Man-Kit Lee 李文傑
1995	15. Kenneth Wong 黃君諾	Info Not Available	Info Not Available	No Award	9. James Chu 祝鏘鎛
1996	4. Daniel Kwan 關浩正	6. Victor Chow 仇耀斌	12. Chiu-Yue Huang 黃秋月	No Award	7. Lily Cosnos 邱莉莉
1997	6. Phillip Lau 劉健濤	3. Aaron Wong 黃敏豪	Info Not Available	No Award	Info Not Available
1998	6. Jacky Chu 祝釩剛	12. Ruby Lu 盧春如	3. Gladys Yu 于 蘭	No Award	12. Ruby Lu 盧春如
1999	6. Chantel Wang 王亞文	7. Jade Kwan 關惠文 (關心妍)	10. Alex Chen 陳維屏	No Award	Info Not Available
2000	6. Jordan Lin 林裕翁	7. Benny Yau 邱穟恆	3. Suzanne Chung 鍾煥燊 (鍾依澄)	No Award	6. Jordan Lin 林裕翁
2001	4. Cindy Cheung 張瑋恩	8. Rebecca Yang 楊詠薇	2. Jenny Chang 張聖伶	8. Rebecca Yang 楊詠薇	2. Jenny Chang 張聖伶
2002	3. Rita Leung 梁璟裕	1. Kitty Bao 鮑 芳	2. Gerald Kwok 郭嘉豪	No Award	3. Rita Leung 梁璟裕
2003	4. Warren Lo 盧韋綸	8. Jimmy Huang 黃鈞麟	3. Bella Chen 陳 薇	4. Warren Lo 盧韋綸	5. Reika Li 李 佳
2004	8. Michael Lee 李今平	1. Min Zhang 張 敏	4. Sicy Tam 譚詩詩	8. Michael Lee 李今平	4. Sicy Tam 譚詩詩
2005	8. Lorretta Chow 周美欣	7. Aaron Chan 陳佑綜	6. Clara Au-Yeung 歐陽梓珊	6. Clara Au-Yeung 歐陽梓珊	7. Aaron Chan 陳佑綜
2006	1. John Lam 林子康	2. Sharon Hung 熊惠芳	7. Raymond Seen 冼棨豪	No Award	2. Sharon Hung 熊惠芳
2007	2. Phil Lam 林漢輝	6. Derek Chiu 趙子恆	3. Kristie Yung 翁可欣	2. Phil Lam 林漢輝	3. Kristie Yung 翁可欣
2008	4. Dionne Phillips 余迪安	8. Laura Tang 湯有麗	7. Micky Tang 鄧佑剛	4. Dionne Phillips 余迪安	3. Dylan Luo 羅迪龍
2009	2. Alvin Man 文思惟	6. Fox Chao 趙文博	7. Jane Yang 楊 箏	6. Fox Chao 趙文博	2. Alvin Man 文思惟
2010	2. Andy Wu 吳彥德	1. David Zhang 張 緯	8. Amelie So 蘇敏儀	1. David Zhang 張 緯	8. Amelie So 蘇敏儀
2011	6. Crystal Leung 粱皓筠	7. Richard Sin 單澤宇	5. Grace Hsu 許恩婷	6. Crystal Leung 粱皓筠	5. Grace Hsu 許恩婷
2012	3. Henry Chan 陳家強	6. Byron Cheung 張可永	1. Harry Yang 楊子翾	6. Byron Cheung 張可永	3. Henry Chan 陳家強

=== Contestant careers ===
- 1994 Winner Angus Ting (丁文俊) returned to Hong Kong and formed the band A-dAY. With the song, "Portrait (寫真)", his band won the 19th Annual CASH Song Writers Quest organized by the Composers and Authors Society of Hong Kong in 2007.
- 1995 Best Stage Performance Award Winner James Chu (祝鏘鎛) went to Taiwan and was signed by Forward Music, a subsidiary of BMG Entertainment Taiwan. He released an album in 1998 under the stage name 楊軒. However, that album was ill-received, and he was dropped from his label. Since then, he has joined Jungiery (a talent company in Taiwan) and now makes up one half of songwriting duo VJ (who writes for popular groups such as 5566, 183 Club, and K One).
- 1996 Winner Daniel Kwan (關浩正) entered Fairchild Television and become a popular host for several years before deciding to go back to Hong Kong.
- 1996 First Runner-Up Victor Chow (仇耀斌) also became a host with Fairchild Television for a couple of years, often partnered with 1996 Best Stage Performance Award winner Lily Cosnos (邱莉莉). The two were later rumoured to be dating.
- 1997 First Runner-Up Aaron Wong (黃敏豪) later entered Fairchild TV and has hosted various programs until 2001 including a guest stint on What's On in 2000.
- 1998 Winner Jacky Chu (祝釩剛) (brother of James Chu) went on to capture First Runner-Up in the NTSA International Finals. He signed with Universal Music Taiwan in 2002 and released a solo album. That album did not sell very well and just like his brother, Jacky was dropped from his label. However, he then joined the Warner Music Taiwan musical quintet, 183 Club, as their lead singer, finally finding fame in 2005. He has also acted in several Taiwanese dramas since 2004. In 2007, he was dismissed from 183 Club and their management company due to his incessant partying and nightlife.
- 1998 Second Runner-Up Ruby Lu (盧春如) was signed to EMI Taiwan and released an album in 1999. However, the album received minimal promotion, which led to poor sales. She then turned to radio and is now a popular radio host in Taiwan.
- 1998 Finalist Elva Hsiao (蕭雅之) signed to Virgin Records in Taiwan and released her self-titled début in 2000 under the stage name 蕭亞軒. She is one of the first NTSA Vancouver contestants to succeed in the Asian music industry and is now a bonafide Asian diva.
- 1998 Finalist Michelle Hsu (徐佳期) was signed to Sony BMG Entertainment in Taiwan. She was paired up with another girl to form the popular musical duo, 蜜雪薇琪 (Michelle*Vickie).
- 1999 Winner Jade Kwan (關惠文) went on to win the NTSA Canada Finals and won the Best Potential Newcomer Award in the NTSA International Finals. She signed a record deal with Hong Kong label BMA Music under the stage name 關心妍 and is now a popular Cantopop singer in Hong Kong.
- 2000 First Runner-Up Benny Yau (邱穟恆) was approached by Fairchild TV right after he competed to host What's On, which he hosted for the next 2 plus years. Currently, he still remains affiliated with Fairchild, performing and presenting various programs for the station. He is one of the judges at the NTSA Vancouver 2007 Auditions and Semi-Finals.
- 2000 Second Runner-Up Suzanne Chung (鍾煥燊) was signed to the management company owned by Hong Kong superstar Andy Lau. She had a bit part in the 2002 movie, Dance of a Dream and also sang duets with Lau on the soundtrack under the stage name 鍾依澄. However, she has dropped off the radar since.
- 2000 Finalist Leslie Tsang (曽穎妍) was approached by Fairchild TV at the same time as Benny and became a host for them for the next 3 years. She is currently in Hong Kong.
- 2000 Finalist Alex Lee (李崗霖) signed with Virgin Records Taiwan and released his solo album in November 2005.
- 2001 Winner Cindy Cheung (張瑋恩) was a host for What's On for Fairchild TV, and has hosted the NTSA Vancouver Finals from 2003 - 2006. She ended her contract with Fairchild TV in November 2006 and have since returned to Hong Kong.
- 2001 Second Runner-Up Jenny Chang (張聖伶) went on to sing the song "Lights Out", which won the Best Arrangement Award at the 11th Annual Canadian Chinese Songwriter's Quest (第十屆加拿大中文歌曲創作大賽) in 2006.
- 2001 Finalist Abraham Siu (蕭正中) hosted What's On for Fairchild TV for 2 years and has now formed a rap duo with 2005 First Runner-Up, Aaron Chan (陳佑綜) called Am3ition in early 2007.
- 2002 Winner Rita Leung (梁璟裕) will be releasing her first published book in 2007.
- 2002 First Runner-Up Kitty Bao (鮑芳) is currently a host for Fairchild TV's mandarin channel, Talentvision.
- 2002 Finalist April Li (李江歌) is currently a DJ for Fairchild Radio in Vancouver.
- 2002 Finalist Sandy Cheung (張梓欣) currently hosts Leisure Talk on Fairchild TV.
- 2002 Finalist Stanley Cheung (張景淳) returned to Hong Kong and joined the band, Cheers. In late 2006, he entered The TVbeople Contest held by TVB and was signed as a "TVbeople", who are artistes that appear in television ads promoting various TVB programs.
- 2002 Finalist Jessica Yu (余宛綺) returned to Taiwan to pursue a singing career, following her parents' footsteps in the music industry.
- 2003 Best Stage Performance Award Winner Reika Li (李佳) hosted programs for Talentvision and was an MC at the NTSA Vancouver Finals 2004.
- 2003 Finalist Eunice Ho (何詠雯) originally entered Fairchild TV as a host for What's On but later became a Promotion Executive for the station as well until March 2006. She is currently a presenter for Hong Kong TVB's entertainment news channel.
- 2003 Finalists Kevin Chiu (趙啟榮) and Scarlet Wong (黃心美) both hosted What's On for Fairchild TV until late 2004.
- 2004 Winner Michael Lee (李今平) entered the 12th Annual Canadian Chinese Songwriter's Quest (第十二屆加拿大中文歌曲創作大賽) organized by Fairchild Radio and won First Place and Best Song Arrangement with the song "Shine In Love", which he wrote and performed.
- 2004 First Runner-Up Min Zhang (張敏) entered the 10th Annual Canadian Chinese Songwriter's Quest (第十屆加拿大中文歌曲創作大賽) organized by Fairchild Radio and won with the song "未完之旅程" ("Unfinished Journey"), which she co-wrote and sang as a duet with her friend Susan Chen.
- 2004 Finalist Ming Fai (Michael) Lee (李明輝) currently hosts What's On for Fairchild TV.
- 2005 Winner Lorretta Chow (周美欣) participated Miss Hong Kong 2007 & won 2nd Runner Up.
- 2005 First Runner-Up, Aaron Chan (陳佑綜) formed a hip-hop group called Am3ition with 2001 Finalist, Abraham Siu (蕭正中) in early 2007 and had released an album locally. He also was one of the Masters of Ceremonies at NTSA Vancouver 2007 and was part of the coaching team for finalists in 2007 and 2008. In August 2008, Chan was involved in a bar brawl and was murdered outside of Atlantis nightclub in downtown Vancouver. He was 25 years old.
- 2005 Finalist Jessica Cheung (張葆頤) currently hosts What's On for Fairchild TV.
- 2005 Finalist Dickson Chu (朱健榮) hosted programs in the spring of 2006 for Fairchild TV.
- 2006 Finalist Seena Zhang (章穎) entered a singing contest organized by Fairchild TV rival, CHMB AM 1320 and won.
- 2008 Finalists Gary Yan (甄嘉亮) and Cherry Kwok (郭鈺淳) currently host What's On for Fairchild TV.

== Vancouver success in NTSA International ==
Here is the list of Vancouver representatives who have won awards in the NTSA International Finals.

- Daniel Kwan 關浩正: NTSA International 1996 First Runner-Up
- Jacky Chu 祝釩剛: NTSA International 1998 First Runner-Up
- Jade Kwan 關惠文 (關心妍): NTSA International 1999 Best Potential Newcomer Award 最具潛質新人獎
- Lorretta Chow 周美欣: NTSA International 2005 Trendy Image Award 時尚形象大獎
- Phil Lam 林漢輝: NTSA International 2007 One-Minute Stage Explosion Award 火爆舞台一分鐘大獎 & Top 4 Finalist
- Dionne Phillips 余迪安: NTSA International 2008 Trendy Style Award 時尚型格大奬 & Top 10 Finalist

== See also ==
- New Talent Singing Awards
- New Talent Singing Awards Toronto Audition
- New Talent Singing Awards Calgary Audition
