= Cindy Cheung (television presenter) =

Chinese actress (born 1984)

Cindy Cheung (張瑋恩)
- Born: Cindy Wai Yan Cheung; 1984 (age 41–42); Hong Kong
- Occupation: TV presenter
- Agent: Fairchild Television (2001-2006)
- Notable credit: What's On (Fairchild Television)
- Website: www.fairchildtv.com/hosts/hosts.php?type=f&id=3

Cindy Cheung (Traditional Chinese: 張瑋恩), born 1984 is a TV presenter, most recently affiliated with Fairchild Television.

== Biography ==
Cindy entered the New Talent Singing Awards Vancouver Audition 2001 and won first place. She then represented Vancouver in the NTSA International Finals in Shanghai, China. She did not place in the top three in the contest.

Upon return from the contest, she started to host live mall shows for Fairchild Television. Finally in 2003, she was placed as a permanent host on the long-running program, What's On and has been with the show until November 2006. Her other credits include hosting the NTSA Vancouver Finals from 2003 to 2006.

Cindy is a graduate at the University of British Columbia studying in economics.

She recently moved back to Hong Kong to pursue another career, ending her contract with Fairchild Television after five years.

== Selected TV filmography ==
- New Talent Singing Awards Vancouver Audition 新秀歌唱大賽溫哥華選拔賽 - Master of Ceremonies (2003–2006)
- What's On 熒幕八爪娛 - Host ( 2003–2006 )
