= Holiday (Sammi Cheng album) =

Studio album by Sammi Cheng
- Released: 18 June 1991
- Recorded: March 1991
- Genres: Pop; Canto-pop; dance-pop; synth-pop; cha-cha-chá; sophisti-pop; new jack swing; ballad
- Length: 45:48
- Language: Cantonese
- Label: Capital Artists
- Producer: C.Y. Kong

Sammi Cheng chronology
Sammi (1990)	Holiday (1991)	Never Too Late (1992)

Singles from Holiday
- 1. "The Season That Never Came"; 2. "Love Lost in Vienna"; 3. "Friends"; 4. "Valentino"; 5. "The Land of Intoxication " [From "A Life of His Own"]"

Holiday (Cantonese: 假期) is the second Cantonese-language studio album by Hong Kong singer Sammi Cheng, released on 18 June 1991 by Capital Artists. The album is noted for its central motif of a beautiful girl journeying through exotic holiday landscapes, and for its distinctive fusion of Hong Kong pop with rich folk influences from across the globe. Its success was further propelled by Cheng’s appearance in the TV drama "A Life of His Own", which helped amplify her popularity and increase her visibility across Asia.

The album achieved platinum certification in Hong Kong, with total sales reaching 70,000 copies. Its popularity was further enhanced by Cheng’s rising fame and media coverage, especially in Taiwan and Singapore, where critics praised her vocal ability and emotional delivery.

== Background and production ==
After the release of her debut album in 1990, Sammi Cheng began to gain recognition for her fresh image and distinctive voice. Building on this momentum, Holiday was recorded by Capital Artists under the guidance of producer C.Y. Kong, with several Hong Kong songwriters contributing to the project. Due to the limited number of musical prodigies in Hong Kong at the time, the album primarily featured adapted songs, although it included more original compositions than her previous album Sammi. Emphasizing sincerity and artistic value, the album was meticulously crafted over ten months, with over 400 hours dedicated to recording and mixing. The team aimed to create a high-quality release that would help revitalize the Hong Kong music scene.

== Composition ==
The album features a mix of pop, dance, cha-cha-chá, and folk elements, representing a wide range of musical influences. The lyrics use the motif of an exotic journey to explore themes of youth, love, friendship, self-discovery and emotional connection.Listeners are encouraged to immerse themselves in the album’s 50-minute journey, evoking the feeling of traveling through a world filled with the fragrance of youth.

== Concept and imagery ==
Holiday is a concept album that incorporates musical elements from various regions. Centered on the idea of sharing a soul-stirring holiday with Sammi Cheng, the album evokes a cosmopolitan atmosphere and allows listeners to experience exotic journeys through music.

The album features Sammi Cheng portraying a beautiful girl on holiday, dressed in simple village attire and embarking on a journey from innocence to maturity. The music blends Western pop influences with Eastern flair and draws on elements from Southeast Asia, the Middle East, and Hong Kong, resulting in a unique and vibrant soundscape.

== Promotion ==
The promotional strategy for this album was more comprehensive than that of Sammi Cheng's debut album Sammi. In addition to television commercials, the album received exposure through various magazine advertisements and feature interviews in local Hong Kong publications such as "100 Marks", "Music Bus", and "Top". The campaign also included product placement in a Fujitsu General air-conditioner commercial, which incorporated the album title. In the advertisement, Sammi naturally mentioned the title of the lead single, "The Season That Never Came".

For the singles, Sammi promoted the lead single "The Season That Never Came" on the television program Enjoy Yourself Tonight on August 7, 1991. She returned to the same show on August 19, 1991, to perform the final single, "Valentino ". That day also marked Sammi’s birthday, and after the performance, the hosts surprised her with a birthday cake to celebrate the occasion

== Singles ==
In Hong Kong, five singles were released from the album. The first four, "The Season That Never Came", "Valentino", "Friends" and "Love Lost in Vienna" were commercial singles intended for play on radio, TVs, and karaoke bars. The last one, "The Land of Intoxication" [from "A Life of His Own"] was a promotional single intended solely for TV Drama. "The Season That Never Came (不來的季節)" was chosen as the album's lead single and reached No. 1 on the 903 chart and TVB's Jade Solid Gold Billboard. "Love Lost in Vienna (情斷維也納)" was released as the second single, peaking at No. 30 on the 903 chart. "Friends" was released as the third single, peaking at No. 5 on the 903 chart. The fourth single and final commercial single, "Valentino", was featured as a recommended song on the TV program Jade Solid Gold, and reached No. 6 on TVB's Jade Solid Gold Billboard.

=== Singles charts ===
Highest rank achieved by the released single
Single	903	RTHK	997	TVB
The Season That Never Came	1	—	/	1
Love Lost in Vienna	30	—	/	—
Friends	5	—	/	—
Valentino	—	—	/	6

== Commercial performance ==
The album topped the HKRMA chart, selling 70,000 copies in Hong Kong, and further expanding Cheng's fan base. It was certified Platinum in Hong Kong.

== Track listing ==
Credits adapted from the album's liner notes.

Sammi – Hong Kong Standard edition
No.	Title	Length
1.	"The Season That Never Came"	4:59
2.	"A Break in Love"	4:24
3.	"Time Passes, Love Fades"	4:03
4.	"Go Go Adiós"	4:46
5.	"The Land of Intoxication " [From "A Life of His Own"]"	3:35
6.	"Love Lost in Vienna"	5:44
7.	"Valentino"	4:24
8.	"Friends"	4:48
9.	"Situationship"	4:25
10.	"Goodbye, Sheltered Life"	4:40
Total length:		45:48

== Charts ==
Chart (1991)	Peak position
Hong Kong Albums (HKRMA)	1

== Release history ==
List of formats and editions of the album being released in each country, along with the date of the release
Country	Date	Format	Catalogue no./Barcode and Other Identifiers	Label	Edition	Ref.
Hong Kong	18 June 1991	CD	CD-22-1111	Capital Artists	Hong Kong Deluxe Edition	
Hong Kong	18 June 1991	CD	CD-22-1111	Capital Artists	Hong Kong Standard Edition	
Hong Kong	18 June 1991	cassette	CAL-22-1111C	Capital Artists		
Malaysia	June 1991	cassette			Malaysian Edition	
Malaysia	June 1991	cassette			Malaysian Second Edition	
Singapore	June 1991	cassette			Singaporean Edition	
Taiwan	1991	cassette	CAL-22-1111C	Fancy Pie	Taiwanese Edition	
Hong Kong	September 20, 2011	CD	EACD678	East Asia Music	Capital Artists 40th Anniversary Reissue Series (Gold Disc)	
