= Ocean Hai =

- Born: 10 July 1982 (age 43); Guangzhou, Guangdong, China
- Occupation: Singer
- Years active: 2006–present

Chinese name
- Traditional Chinese: 海鳴威
- Simplified Chinese: 海鸣威
Transcriptions
Standard Mandarin
- Hanyu Pinyin: Hǎi Míngwēi
- Musical career
- Origin: Guangzhou, Guangdong
- Labels: Emperor Entertainment Group (China)
- Website: Baidu Ocean

Hai Mingwei (Chinese: 海鸣威; pinyin: Hǎi Míngwēi; born 10 July 1982), Ocean Hai, is a Chinese musical artist.

== Biography ==
He came in first place in the singing contest "New Idol" in 2000, then was champion of the National Hip-Hop contest in 2002. In 2005, he was invited by Jacky Cheung as a special guest to the music drama "Xue Lang Hu", in which, he himself played seven roles. Finally in 2006, he signed a contract with EEG after he came second in the CCTV program "Meng Xiang Zhong Guo" . On May 19, 2007, he released his first album "Dance Dance Dance", of which the main song is called "Lao Ren Yu Hai". His Chinese name is similar to Hemingway (Chinese: 海明威). Ocean Hai is managed by the Emperor Entertainment Group.
