= Never Too Late (Sammi Cheng album) =

Studio album by Sammi Cheng
- Released: July 1992
- Recorded: March 1992
- Genres: Pop; jazz; contemporary R&B
- Length: 43:50
- Language: Cantonese
- Label: Capital Artists
- Producer: C.Y. Kong

Sammi Cheng chronology
Holiday (1991)	Never Too Late (1992)	Sammi Cheng's Happy Maze (1993)

Singles from Never Too Late
- 1. "Say U’ll Be Mine"; 2. "Doll's View of the World"; 3. "I Don’t Want To Leave Tonight"; 4. "2gether [from "Rookie Cops"]"; 5. "If You Love Me [from "The File of Justice"]"

Never Too Late (Cantonese: 為時未晚) is the third Cantonese-language studio album by Hong Kong singer Sammi Cheng, released in July 1992 through Capital Artists. Marking a major shift in Cheng’s image and musical direction, the album showcases her transformation from a youthful idol to a more mature and self-assured artist. It features a blend of upbeat pop and mid-tempo ballads, reflecting themes of growth, love, and self-acceptance.

The album achieved commercial success, being certified platinum with total sales surpassing 60,000 copies in Hong Kong. However, its singles did not perform as well on the pop charts as those from her previous album, Holiday, with critics noting that the more sophisticated style lacked mainstream appeal and resulted in a lukewarm chart response. Despite this, the track "Doll's View of the World" was recognized as one of Cheng's signature songs after becoming a karaoke hit. In addition, Cheng received the "Best Youthful Female Artist" award at Metro Radio’s "Beauty Awards” for this album, and was seen by many industry insiders as a strong contender to become the next diva of the Hong Kong music industry.

== Background and development ==
Following the success of her second album, Holiday, Sammi Cheng emerged as the most promising young female singer of her generation, widely regarded as a top contender to become the next diva of the Hong Kong music industry. Never Too Late was recorded under the guidance of producer C.Y. Kong for Capital Artists, with contributions from several Hong Kong and Japanese songwriters.

Cheng took over a year to release the album, using this extended break to develop a more mature image and sound. According to promotional interviews at the time, recording sessions were postponed due to her busy schedule filming the movie Best of the Best and the television drama File of Justice; her label sought to prevent any negative impact on her vocal quality from fatigue. Cheng supported this approach, believing that taking more time would lead to a higher-quality record, and chose to follow the label’s strategy. She also noted that taking a step back to observe and absorb life experiences helped her grow as an artist and approach the new album with increased confidence. Meanwhile, Capital Artists was undergoing restructuring, providing Cheng and her peers greater freedom to move beyond the traditional young idol image.

== Composition ==
The album mainly features Canto-pop with a mix of pop ballads, jazz, contemporary R&B, adult contemporary, new jack swing, and mid-tempo tracks. Most tracks on the album are adaptations of foreign songs, with a smaller proportion of original compositions compared to Cheng’s previous album, Holiday. In addition to works by Hong Kong musicians, the album includes a jazz track composed by Japanese musician EPO, specifically commissioned by Capital Artists. Main themes of the songs revolve around self-discovery, reflection, and relationships, presenting Cheng in a more sophisticated light

== Concept and imagery ==
For the release of Never Too Late, Cheng adopted a new, sophisticated look featuring short, voluminous curly hair and minimalist, elegant styling. The album photoshoots incorporate a soft pastel color palette and a light, dreamy atmosphere. She is depicted with natural makeup and understated outfits, emphasizing a fresh yet mature image. This aesthetic highlights her transformation from a youthful idol to a mature artist, and bold poses underscore her "grown-up teen” transition and inner confidence. According to magazine interviews, Cheng shared that as someone energetic and youthful, it took her some time to accept a more mature image. At first, she felt a bit awkward dressing in a mature style. However, she eventually embraced this change, expressing that it is important to make timely changes, because singers sometimes need to bring freshness to their fans. The album’s title was inspired by its release more than a year after Holiday. The song selection leans toward more mature and technically demanding pieces.

== Promotion ==
A press conference was held on the day of the album's release, and an autograph session took place after the album achieved platinum sales status. In addition to television appearances, the album received exposure through magazine advertisements and feature interviews in local Hong Kong publications such as 100 Marks, Oriental Sunday, and Yes. For the singles, Cheng appeared on the travel segment "Yangtze River Voyage" of the variety show Enjoy Yourself Tonight, where she promoted the album's second single, "Doll's View of the World." She also promoted it through an interview with Hong Kong magazine 100 Marks.

== Singles ==
In Hong Kong, five singles were released from the album. The first three, "Say U’ll Be Mine", "Doll's View of the World" and "I Don’t Want To Leave Tonight" were commercial singles intended for play on radio, TVs, and karaoke bars. The last two, "2gether" [from "Rookie Cops"] and "If You Love Me" [from "The File of Justice"] were promotional singles intended solely for TV Drama.

"Say U’ll Be Mine" was chosen as the album's lead single, reaching No. 6 on the 903 chart and No. 9 on the RTHK Chinese Pop Chart."Doll's View of the World (娃娃看天下)" was released as the second single, peaking at No. 10 on the 903 chart, No. 4 on the RTHK Chinese Pop Chart, and No. 8 on TVB's Jade Solid Gold Billboard. "I Don’t Want To Leave Tonight" (這夜我不願離開) was released as the third and final commercial single, peaking at No. 24 on the 903 chart.

== Accolades ==
Publication	Accolade	Ref.
Metro Radio’s "Beauty Awards”	Best Youthful Female Artist	

== Track listing ==
Credits adapted from the album's liner notes.

Sammi – Hong Kong Standard edition
No.	Title	Length
1.	"Why"	3:48
2.	"Say U’ll Be Mine"	4:26
3.	"2gether [from "Rookie Cops"]"	4:32
4.	"If You Love Me [from "The File of Justice"]"	4:45
5.	"Love Leads Us Across a Thousand Miles"	4:59
6.	"It’s Too Late"	4:08
7.	"I Don’t Want To Leave Tonight"	5:18
8.	"Doll's View of the World"	4:32
9.	"The Nighttime Passion"	4:35
10.	"If Only You..."	3:49
Total length:		43:50

== Release history ==
List of formats and editions of the album being released in each country, along with the date of the release
Country	Date	Format	Label	Edition	Ref.
Hong Kong	July 1992	CD	Capital Artists	Standard edition	
Hong Kong	July 1992	CD	Capital Artists	Deluxe edition	
Malaysia	July 1992	Cassette	Capital Artists	Malaysian edition	
Malaysia	July 1992	Cassette	Capital Artists	Malaysian second edition	
Singapore	July 1992	Cassette	Capital Artists	Singaporean edition	
Taiwan	July 1992	Cassette	Fancy Pie	Taiwanese edition	
Hong Kong	September 23, 2011	CD	East Asia Music	Capital Artists 40th Anniversary Reissue Series (Gold Disc)	
