= 1990 RTHK Top 10 Gold Songs Awards =

Hong Kong music awards ceremony

The 1990 RTHK Top 10 Gold Songs Awards (Chinese: 第十三屆十大中文金曲頒獎音樂會) was held in 1991 for the 1990 music season.

== Top 10 song awards ==
The top 10 songs (十大中文金曲) of 1990 are as follows.

Song name in Chinese	Artist	Composer	Lyricist
俾面派對	Beyond	Wong Ka Kui	Paul Wong
一千零一夜	Hacken Lee	Kōji Tamaki	Jolland Chan Kim Wo (向雪懷)
相逢何必曾相識	Ram Chiang; Rita Carpio	Ram Chiang	Ram Chiang
你知道我在等你嗎	Jeremy Chang (張洪量)	Jeremy Chang (張洪量)	Jeremy Chang (張洪量)
前塵	Sandy Lam	Dick Lee	Thomas Chow (周禮茂)
失戀	Grasshopper	Chatri Kongsowan	Pun Wai-yun (潘偉源)
夕陽醉了	Jacky Cheung	Angus Tung	Siu mei (小美)
特別的愛給特別的你	Sky Wu (伍思凱)	Sky Wu (伍思凱)	Chan Ga-lai (陳家麗)
焚心以火	Sally Yeh	Wong Jim; Joseph Koo	Wong Jim
可不可以	Andy Lau	Tony Tam	Gan ning (簡寧)

== Other awards ==
Award	Song or album (if available)	Recipient
Best commercial song award (最佳中文廣告歌曲獎)	–	(gold) Anthony Lun, Richard Lam (silver) Luk Gwan-leon (陸崑崙), Leong Gwok-biu (梁國標) (bronze) Mahmood Rumjahn (林慕德), Au Coek-San (區焯申)
Best karaoke song award (最愛歡迎卡拉ok歌曲獎)	無言的結局	Li Mau-saan (李茂山) Lam Suk-jung (林淑蓉)
Best new prospect award (最有前途新人獎)	–	(gold) Tsang Hong-saang (曾航生) (silver) Leon Lai (bronze) Raymond Choi (蔡濟文), Harlem Yu (Exceptional award) May Ng (吳婉芳), Sammi Cheng, Face to Face
Best record producer award (最佳唱片監製獎)	Faces & Places	Hui Yun (許願) for Sandy Lam
Best musical arrangements (最佳編曲獎)	前塵	Anthony Lun
Best record design award (最佳唱片封套設計獎)	All The Best	Joe Chu
Best C-pop song award (最佳中文流行歌曲獎)	天間	Tats Lau
Best C-pop lyrics award (最佳中文流行歌詞獎)	滄海一聲笑	Wong Jim
Outstanding Mandarin song award (優秀國語歌曲獎)	把根留住	Angus Tung Wong Hing-yun (黃慶元)
RTHK Golden needle award (金針獎)	–	Wong Jim
