= Sammi Movie Theme Songs Collection =

Compilation album by Sammi Cheng
- Released: April 18, 2002
- Recorded: 1996–2002
- Genres: Pop; ballad
- Length: 1:06:10
- Languages: Cantonese,Mandarin
- Label: Warner Music Hong Kong

Sammi Cheng chronology
Tender (2001)	Sammi Movie Theme Songs Collection (2002)	Letting Go (2002)

Alternative cover
- Taiwanese Special Edition artwork

The Best of Sammi Movie Theme Songs

Singles from Sammi Movie Theme Songs Collection
- 1. "Beautiful Life [From "Love on a Diet"]"

Sammi Movie Theme Songs Collection (Cantonese: 鄭秀文電影金曲精選); released in Malaysia as The Best of Sammi Movie Theme Songs is the first soundtrack compilation album by Hong Kong singer and actress Sammi Cheng, released by Warner Music Hong Kong on April 18, 2002. the album features 17 film theme songs and insert songs from films in which Cheng starred as the leading actress. Although the album was originally issued with the grammatically unusual English title Sammi Movie Theme Songs Collections, major digital platforms such as Apple Music, AllMusic, and Amazon list the album as Sammi Movie Theme Songs Collection. The album achieved commercial success in Hong Kong, Singapore, and Malaysia, and contributed to Cheng receiving the IFPI (Hong Kong Group) Top Sales Music Award for Best-Selling Female Artist of 2002. In Taiwan and Singapore, alternative editions were issued that replaced seven of the Cantonese film songs with Mandarin-language versions recorded by Cheng.

== Background ==
The compilation was released to celebrate the success of Cheng's film song Beautiful Life [From "Love on a Diet"] (終生美麗), which won Best Original Film Song at the 21st Hong Kong Film Awards.

Cheng made her film debut in 1992 with Best of the Best (飛虎精英之人間有情), for which she received a Best New Performer nomination at the 12th Hong Kong Film Awards. She first emerged as a popular film actress in 1996 with the romantic comedy Feel 100% (百分百感覺), which established her as a leading actress and attracted industry attention. Her performances were endorsed by established stars such as Stephen Chow and Josephine Siao, who predicted her strong potential for future success. By the early 2000s, Cheng had become Hong Kong's box office queen and was recognized as one of the territory's leading actresses. In 2000, she earned a Best Leading Actress nomination at the 37th Golden Horse Awards for Needing You... (孤男寡女) and was also nominated for Best Actress at the 20th Hong Kong Film Awards. In 2002, Cheng received three further Best Actress nominations at the 21st Hong Kong Film Awards for Wu Yen (鍾無艷), Love on a Diet (瘦身男女), and Fighting for Love (同居密友). On 20 January 2002, Sammi Cheng won Best Actress at the Hong Kong Film Critics Society Award for her acclaimed performance in Wu Yen (鍾無艷). Against this backdrop of simultaneous achievements in film and music, Warner Music Hong Kong issued Sammi Movie Theme Songs Collection to highlight her crossover appeal as both a Cantopop diva and a film star.

== Promotion ==
To promote the album, Warner Music Hong Kong launched a campaign that included posters in magazines and newspapers, as well as television advertisements. The promotional materials emphasized Cheng's dual status as a leading actress with billion-dollar box office records and as a Cantopop singer with million-selling albums, positioning the compilation as a crossover success in both film and music markets. These efforts reinforced the album's visibility in Hong Kong and overseas markets such as Singapore and Malaysia.

== Singles ==
"Beautiful Life " [From "Love on a Diet"] peaked at number one on four Music charts. It maintained that position for one week on the RTHK Chinese pop chart,and also maintained that position for four consecutive weeks on Metro Radio 1834997.com On-line Chart. Additionally, it was also so popular in karaoke bars that it shot straight to the top of the karaoke charts for a few weeks.

== Accolades ==
Year	Publication	Recipient(s) and nominee(s)	Accolade	Ref.
2001	21st Hong Kong Film Awards	Beautiful Life [From "Love on a Diet"] (終生美麗)	Best Original Film Song	
2003	Hong Kong Top Sales Music Award presented 2002	Herself	The Best Sales Local Female Vocalist (全年最高銷量本地女歌手)	

== Track listing ==
Credits adapted from the album's liner notes

Sammi Movie Theme Songs Collection –Hong Kong Standard edition
No.	Title	Length
1.	"Beautiful Life [From "Love on a Diet"]"	3:26
2.	"Emotion Line [From "Needing You"]"	4:06
3.	"Love Is Not Exclusive [From "Wu Yen"]"	4:23
4.	"Searching for Love [From "Wu Yen"]"	4:08
5.	"Doctor and I [From "Fighting for Love"]"	3:05
6.	"Feel Happy That Day? [From "Fighting for Love"]"	3:23
7.	"Glass Shoe [From "Marry a Rich Man"]"	4:12
8.	"Parachute [From "Marry a Rich Man"]"	3:24
9.	"Summer Holiday [From "Summer Holiday"] [Mandarin]"	4:45
10.	"If We Don't See Each Other [From "Summer Holiday"]"	4:15
11.	"Our Close Relationship [From "The Lucky Guy"]"	4:06
12.	"Making The Same Mistakes [From "The Lucky Guy"]"	4:11
13.	"Our Theme Song [From "Killing Me Tenderly"]"	3:36
14.	"One Last Time [From "Killing Me Tenderly"]"	3:50
15.	"Owe You Nothing [From "Feel 100% 1"]"	4:18
16.	"Asking Me [From "Feel 100% 1"]"	3:40
17.	"Tacit Moment [From "Feel 100% 2"]"	3:41
Total length:		1:06:10

Sammi Movie Theme Songs Collection –Malaysian second edition bonus tracks
No.	Title	Producer(s)	Length
18.	"Loving Someone [From "My Left Eye See Ghosts"]"	'	3:23
19.	"Roller Coaster [From "My Left Eye See Ghosts"]"		3:06

Sammi Movie Theme Songs Collection –Singaporean/Taiwanese Special Edition
No.	Title	Length
1.	"Unbearable Touch [From "Love on a Diet"][Mandarin]"	3:26
2.	"Glass Shoe [From "Marry a Rich Man"][Mandarin]"
3.	"Owe You Nothing [From "Feel 100% 1"]"
4.	"Our Theme Song [From "Killing Me Tenderly"] [Mandarin]"
5.	"Summer Holiday [From "Summer Holiday"] [Mandarin]"
6.	"Don’t Be Sad [From "Needing You"] [Mandarin]"
7.	"Our Close Relationship [From "The Lucky Guy"]"
8.	"Asking Me [From "Feel 100% 1"]"
9.	"If A Woman [From "Wu Yen"] [Mandarin]"
10.	"Doctor and I [From "Fighting for Love"]"
11.	"Is It Possible [From "Summer Holiday"] [Mandarin]"
12.	"One Last Time [From "Killing Me Tenderly"]"
13.	"Making The Same Mistakes [From "The Lucky Guy"]"
14.	"Date With Three People [From "Wu Yen"][Mandarin]"
15.	"Feel Happy That Day? [From "Fighting for Love"]"
16.	"Parachute [From "Marry a Rich Man"]"
17.	"Tacit Moment [From "Feel 100% 2"]"
Total length:		1:06:10

== Commercial performance ==
“Sammi Movie Theme Songs Collection“was commercially successful in Singapore and Malaysia, where it remained on the official sales charts for more than ten consecutive weeks. In Hong Kong, the album also performed well, with the initial pressing selling 50,000 copies and overall sales later surpassing 100,000 units.It became one of the key releases that contributed to Cheng receiving the IFPI (Hong Kong Group) Top Sales Music Award for Best-Selling Female Artist of 2002.

== Release history ==
List of formats and editions of the album being released in each country, along with the date of the release
Country	Date	Format	Edition	Label	Ref.
Hong Kong	April 18, 2002	HDCD	Hong Kong edition (Gold compact disc)	Warner Music Hong Kong	
Canada	April 18, 2002	HDCD	Hong Kong import	Warner Music	
Malaysia	April 18, 2002	CD	Malaysian edition	Warner Music Malaysia	
Hong Kong	July 2002	HDCD	Hong Kong edition (Silver compact disc)	Warner Music Hong Kong	
Taiwan	July 9, 2002	HDCD	Taiwanese Special Edition	Warner Music Taiwan	
Singapore	July 9, 2002	HDCD	Singaporean Special Edition	Warner Music Singapore	
Malaysia	July 2002	CD	Malaysian second edition	Warner Music Malaysia	
Hong Kong	June 8, 2017	SACD	The Warner Premium Sound series (Hong Kong Limited Edition)	Warner Music Hong Kong	
Taiwan	June 8, 2017	SACD	The Warner Premium Sound series (Hong Kong import)	Warner Music Taiwan	
