= New Talent Singing Awards =

Annual singing competition in Hong Kong

Current logo of NTSA International Finals, in use since 2005.

New Talent Singing Awards (Chinese: 新秀歌唱大賽) or NTSA for short, later re-organised into New Talent Singing Awards International Finals (Chinese: 全球華人新秀歌唱大賽 or NTSA International Finals for short), and most currently renamed TVB8 International Chinese New Talent Singing Championship (Chinese: TVB8全球華人新秀歌唱大賽) is an annual singing competition organised by TVB that searches out new singers to enter the Asian music industry.

== History ==
=== Beginning (1982–1992) ===
Logo of NTSA from 1982 to 1996.

Held in Hong Kong only, contestants are required to compete through multiple rounds to display their vocal talent through different genres of songs and/or vocal challenges such as singing cappellas or in a different language etc. The winner is guaranteed a recording contract with Capital Artists Recording Company.

=== Overseas addition (1993–1996) ===
With increased Hong Kong Chinese emigrated to North America, TVB opened "Overseas Contestant" category to attract contestants and held the contest in cities such as Vancouver, Calgary, Toronto, New York, Los Angeles and San Francisco.

=== International affair (1997–2004) ===
Logo of NTSA International Finals from 1997 to 2004.

With the emergence of several Asian, Australian and European cities like Shanghai, Melbourne, London, and Amsterdam wanting to be included in the event, in 1997, TVB Hong Kong created the New Talent Singing Awards International Finals 全球華人新秀歌唱大賽. Instead of having one "overseas contestant" from North America competing in the NTSA Finals (now renamed the New Talent Singing Awards Hong Kong Regional Finals 全球華人新秀歌唱大賽香港區選拔賽), now each participating country would send regional representatives to compete in the NTSA International Finals (much like an international beauty pageant would). Also, due to the downsizing of Capital Artists, Emperor Entertainment Group (EEG) took over organising the contest with TVB.

=== EEG & Mandarin dominance (2005–present) ===
The international finals and the Hong Kong regional finals changed their names and logos once again in 2005. Because of the heavy influence of co-organiser Emperor Entertainment Group (EEG), the Hong Kong regional finals is now simply called EEG Singing Contest 英皇新秀歌唱大賽, completely discarding the "New Talent" part of the English title. As for the International Finals, since TVB has decided to move the contest to its mandarin channel, TVB8, the international finals changed its name into TVB8 International Chinese New Talent Singing Championship TVB8全球華人新秀歌唱大賽. Because of the move, there have been many more contestants representing different regions of Mainland China since 2005. In 2006, spots for several "Internet Region Representatives" are devoted solely to Mainland Chinese contestants who does not live in an area where a NTSA Regional contest is held.

Starting in 2009, TVB has stopped organising EEG Singing Contest and instead has its new reality-show style singing competition, The Voice 超級巨聲 select Hong Kong's representative for the International Finals. Because the 2009 NTSA International Finals was held during the run of season one of The Voice, the show selected the contestant with the highest average score thus far, Hong Kin Chan to represent Hong Kong. However, a day before the International Finals he pulled out due to sickness, marking it the first time Hong Kong was not represented in the history of the competition.

== Cities hosted NTSA regional contests (past and/or present) ==
- Amsterdam, the Netherlands
- Auckland, New Zealand
- Brisbane, Australia
- Calgary, Alberta, Canada
- Chicago, United States
- Guangzhou, China
- Hong Kong
- Houston, Texas United States
- Jiangsu, China
- Johor, Malaysia
- Kuala Lumpur, Malaysia
- London, England
- Los Angeles, United States
- Melbourne, Australia
- New York City, United States
- Pahang, Malaysia
- Penang, Malaysia
- Rotterdam, The Netherlands
- Sabah, Malaysia
- San Francisco, United States
- Shanghai, China
- Sichuan, China
- Sydney, Australia
- Toronto, Ontario, Canada
- Tianjin, China
- Vancouver, British Columbia, Canada
- Winnipeg, Manitoba, Canada
- Zhejiang, China

== Past winners and notable contestants ==
NTSA has been the start of many Asian celebrities today. Some have stayed in the music business and have become popular performers, while some have become actors and TV presenters. Below is a list of winners as well as past contestants who have made a contribution to the entertainment business after competing in NTSA.

| Year | Contestant | Representing Region (1997 Onwards) | Placement and Award(s) | Ref. |
|---|---|---|---|---|
| 1982 | Anita Mui (梅艷芳) | --- | Winner | |
| 1982 | Rita Carpio (韋綺姍) | --- | First runner-up | |
| 1983 | David Lui (呂方) | --- | Winner | |
| 1983 | Samey Fong (方心美) | --- | Top 10 Finalist | |
| 1983 | Deric Wan (溫兆倫) | --- | Finalist | |
| 1984 | Dicky Cheung (張衛健) | --- | Winner | |
| 1984 | Gallen Lo (羅嘉良) | --- | Finalist | |
| 1985 | Alex To (杜德偉) | --- | Winner | |
| 1985 | William So (蘇永康) | --- | First runner-up | |
| 1985 | Gina Lam (林楚麒) | --- | Second runner-up | |
| 1985 | Grasshopper (草蜢) | --- | Finalist | |
| 1985 | Eddie Ng (吳國敬) | --- | Finalist | |
| 1985 | Elvina Kong (江欣燕) | --- | Finalist | |
| 1985 | Hacken Lee (李克勤) | --- | Semi-finalist | |
| 1985 | Vivian Chow (周慧敏) | --- | Semi-finalist | |
| 1985 | Derek Kok (郭政鴻) | --- | Semi-finalist | |
| 1985 | Sarah Wong (黃寶欣) | --- | | |
| 1986 | Pui Ling Man (文佩玲) | --- | Winner | |
| 1986 | Andy Hui (許志安) | --- | First runner-up | |
| 1986 | Leon Lai (黎明) | --- | Second runner-up | |
| 1986 | Shirley Kwan (關淑怡) | --- | Finalist | |
| 1987 | Hui Hong Fong (方曉紅) | --- | Winner | |
| 1987 | Canti Lau (劉錫明) | --- | First runner-up | |
| 1988 | Patrick Tam (譚耀文) | --- | Winner | |
| 1988 | Sammi Cheng (鄭秀文) | --- | Second runner-up | |
| 1988 | Ekin Cheng (鄭伊健) | --- | Finalist | |
| 1988 | Bondy Chiu (趙學而) | --- | Finalist | |
| 1989 | Mei Kwan Tong (湯美君) | --- | Winner | |
| 1989 | Edmond Leung (梁漢文) | --- | Finalist | |
| 1990 | Chun Tung Tsui (徐鎮東) | --- | Winner | |
| 1991 | Lee Ka Keung (李家強) | --- | Winner | |
| 1991 | Karen Tong (湯寶如) | --- | Top 5 Finalist | |
| 1992 | Stephanie Che (車婉婉) | --- | Winner | |
| 1993 | Andrew Cheung (張崇基) Peter Cheung (張崇德) | --- | Winner | |
| 1993 | Coco Lee (李玟) | --- | First runner-up | |
| 1994 | Gabriel Harrison (海俊傑) | --- | Winner | |
| 1995 | Eason Chan (陳奕迅) | --- | Winner | |
| 1995 | Miriam Yeung (楊千嬅) | --- | First runner-up | |
| 1995 | Joyce Tang (滕麗名) | --- | Finalist | |
| 1996 | Denise Ho (何韻詩) | --- | Winner | |
| 1996 | Cindy Au (歐倩怡) | --- | Second runner-up | |
| 1996 | Patrick Tang (鄧健泓) | Overseas Contestant (Calgary, Alberta, Canada) | Finalist | |
| 1997 | Wilfred Lau (劉浩龍) | Hong Kong | Winner | |
| 1998 | Jacky Chu (祝釩剛) | Vancouver, British Columbia, Canada | First runner-up | |
| 1999 | Noella Choi (蔡瑋瑜) | Toronto, Ontario, Canada | Finalist | |
| 1999 | Jade Kwan (關心妍) | Vancouver, British Columbia, Canada | Best Potential Newcomer | |
| 1999 | Emma Yiu | London, England | Finalist | |
| 2000 | Kit Wan Liu (廖潔韻) | New York City, USA | Winner | |
| 2000 | (林凯璇) | Malaysia | First runner-up, Best Stage Performance Award, Best Potential Newcomer | |
| 2001 | Ling Xia Kuo (郭凌霞) | Shanghai, China | Winner | |
| 2002 | BE4 | Shanghai, China | Winner | |
| 2002 | Deep Ng (吳浩康) | Hong Kong | Second runner-up, Winner (Hong Kong Regional Contest) | |
| 2003 | Nga Ming Tong (唐雅明) | San Francisco, USA | Winner | |
| 2003 | William Chan (陳偉霆) | Hong Kong | Finalist | |
| 2004 | Ming Li Wang (王明麗) | Johor, Malaysia | Winner | |
| 2004 | Fayse Goh (吳國菲) | Penang, Malaysia | First runner-up | |
| 2004 | Keith Wong (王琪) (王凱駿) | Hong Kong | Second runner-up | |
| 2004 | Dennis Mak (麥子豪) | Hong Kong | Finalist (Hong Kong Regional Contest) | |
| 2005 | Wei Liu (劉維) | Shanghai, China | Winner | |
| 2005 | Meeia Foo (符琼音) | Malaysia | First runner-up, Perfect Tone Award | |
| 2005 | Lorretta Chow (周美欣) | Vancouver, British Columbia, Canada | Trendy Image Award | |
| 2005 | Sherman Chung (鍾舒漫) | Hong Kong | Finalist Winner (Hong Kong Regional Contest) | |
| 2005 | Vincy Chan (陳家欣 (泳兒)) | Hong Kong | First runner (Hong Kong Regional Contest) | |
| 2006 | Andrew Tan (陳世安) | Penang, Malaysia | Winner | |
| 2006 | Ken Hung (洪卓立) | Hong Kong | First runner (Hong Kong Regional Contest) | |
| 2006 | Laiying Wang (王來穎) | Rotterdam, The Netherlands | Best Stage Performance Award | |
| 2007 | Hau Yian Or (柯皓燃) | Zhejiang, China | Winner | |
| 2007 | Thor Lok (駱振偉) | Hong Kong | Winner (Hong Kong Regional Contest) | |
| 2008 | Xu Pan (潘旭) | Jilin, China | Winner | |
| 2008 | Celia Liang (梁曉珺) | Sydney, Australia | First runner-up | |
| 2009 | Keat Yoke, Chen (曾洁钰) | Pahang, Malaysia | Winner, Perfect Tone Award | |
| 2009 | Melissa Seow (蕭麗施) | Melbourne, Australia | First runner-up | |
| 2010 | Hubert Wu (胡鴻鈞) | Hong Kong | Winner | |
| 2010 | Peace Teo (張詒博) | Johor, Malaysia | First runner-up | |
| 2011 | James Li (利健森) | Brisbane, Australia | Winner | |
| 2011 | Rachel Chua (蔡艾珈) | Singapore | First runner-up | |
| 2011 | Jerry Liu (廖仲謙) | Hong Kong | Second runner-up | |
| 2012 | Sheldon Lo (羅孝勇) | Hong Kong | Winner | |
| 2012 | YingLong Wang (王應龍) | Sichuan, China | First runner-up | |
| 2012 | Emily Hui (許家欣) | Toronto, Ontario, Canada | Second runner-up | |
| 2013 | Zheng Xinqi (郑兴琦) | Sichuan, China | Winner | |
| 2014 | Uriah See (徐凯) | Johor, Malaysia | Winner | |
| 2015 | Jacqueline Ng (黄裔媁) | Penang, Malaysia | Winner | |
| 2016 | Brian Chew (周奕斌) | Penang, Malaysia | Winner | |

== See also ==
- New Talent Singing Awards Vancouver Audition
- New Talent Singing Awards Toronto Audition
- Calgary New Talent Singing Awards
- Jade Solid Gold Top 10 Awards
- RTHK Top 10 Gold Songs Awards
- The Voice
