= Capital Artists =

Hong Kong–based record label

- Parent company: eSun Holdings, a subsidiary of Lai Sun Development
- Founded: 1971; 55 years ago
- Status: stopped recording music in 2001; acquired by eSun Holdings in 2008; relabeled in 2010
- Distributors: Media Asia Music, since 2012
- Genre: Various, predeominantly: Cantopop; Mandopop; Chinese opera Chinese children's songs
- Country of origin: Colonial Hong Kong
- Location: Hong Kong

Capital Artists
- Traditional Chinese: 華星唱片出版有限公司
- Simplified Chinese: 华星唱片出版有限公司
Transcriptions
Standard Mandarin
- Hanyu Pinyin: Huá Xīng Chàngpiàn Chūbǎn Yǒuxiàn Gōngsī
Yue: Cantonese
- Yale Romanization: Wa^{4} Sing^{1} Cheung^{3} Pin^{3} Cheut^{1} Baan^{2} Yau^{5} Haan^{6} Gung^{1} Si^{1}
- Jyutping: Waa^{4} Sing^{1} Coeng^{3} Pin^{3} Ceot^{1} Baan^{2} Jau^{5} Haan^{6} Gung^{1} Si^{1}

Capital Artists is a Hong Kong–based record label owned by eSun Holdings, a subsidiary of Lai Sun Development. Founded in 1971, Capital Artists signed some of the biggest names in the Cantopop industry, including Roman Tam, Anita Mui, and Leslie Cheung, among many others. During its prime in the 1970s and 1980s, Capital had dozens of artists under contract and was one of the biggest labels in Hong Kong.

In early 1996, Capital Artists was purchased by SCMP Group. In 2001, after four years of poor sales, Capital Artists ceased music production and dismissed most of its staff, staying in business solely to collect copyright revenue and issue compilations. In late 2008, it was purchased by eSun Holdings.

The Capital Artists logo is a lower-case "c" merged into a lower-case, slightly larger, "a".

== History ==
Capital Artists is officially established in 1971.

In 1972, Capital Artists began hosting concerts and placed music producers Chan Suk-fan (Chinese: 陳淑芬) and Chan Lau-chyun (Chinese: 陳柳泉) in charge of the events. In 1975, a records division was established.

Throughout the 1970s, Capital Artists focused primarily on producing music for television dramas.

In 1982, Capital Artists signed Agnes Chan and Leslie Cheung.

In 1982, however, Capital Artists shifted their focus to the Hong Kong–based television network TVB and began taking part in TVB's newly created singing competition, New Talent Singing Awards (NTSA). The winner of the contest was guaranteed a recording contract with the record label. The singing competition would be renamed New Talent Singing Awards International Finals and then New Talent Singing Awards Hong Kong Regional Finals with the record label continuing to give recording contracts till 2004 where it stopped its involvement. In the inaugural singing competition, Anita Mui won the competition and subsequently signed with the company.

Capital Artists has claimed many music superstars, and for a time, it was one of the top five record labels in Hong Kong, along with BMG, PolyGram, Warner Bros. Records, and EMI.

== Chronology ==
- 1974 - Roman Tam joins, making many well-known songs over the next twelve years.
- 1991 - At the tenth NTSA, Anita Mui is both an adjudicator and the guest performer. She steps on stage to perform her anthem, "Sunset Melody", but turns around and stops the musicians in the background abruptly during the music break. She then proceeds to give a speech, live on TV, imploring Capital Artists to take better care of the singers discovered through the singing competition, as many previous contestants signed to Capital Artists have languished without any releases to their names.
- 1994 - Anita Mui releases her first new album after resuming her career full-time. Her album, It's Like This (是這樣的), reaches double-platinum upon initial release, with four different tracks topping the charts. The first song, "Where'd My Love Go?" (情歸何處), breaks several records by leaping to #1 on all four of Hong Kong's Chinese pop charts immediately upon release on the airwaves, which is unprecedented. Capital Artists holds a press conference to also announce that Mui's cumulative album sales throughout her career has surpassed 10 million, a record for a female Asian artist at the time. The Capital Artists also produces 5,000 gold-plated commemorative copies of It's Like This to mark the album's success. Later, one company executive will reveal that sales from this album enabled the company to award a bonus of one month's salary to each of its employees.
- 1995 - Anita Mui releases her last album with Capital Artists under her contract at the time. There are rumors that Mui is not happy with the amount of promotions done for this album.
- 1995 - In order to boost record sales, Capital reduces all record prices to HKD 88 (US$11).
- 1996 - Capital Artists is officially purchased by the SCMP Group, and with the exception of the hiring of Ng Sui-wan (吳瑞雲) as general manager, nothing is changed.
- 1997 - After a brief hiatus, Anita Mui renews her contract with Capital Artists for an annual price of HKD 20 million (US$2.6 million). Capital Artists pledges to redouble their promotional efforts for her upcoming album, Illusions (鏡花水月). "Illusions" tops the sales chart.
- 2000 - Anita Mui releases her last album with Capital Artists, I'm So Happy (also known by its original name, Mui Mui S/S 2000), to fulfill her final contract (which was supposed to expire in 1998 were it not for Capital Artists delaying production and release of her last two albums under contract). Capital Artists indicated that the company would spend HKD 2 million (US$260,000) to promote this last album but never delivered. Afterwards, Mui, in a magazine interview, discloses that she decided to leave Capital Artists because she was tired of the constant personnel turnover at the company, and she felt new management did not respect her. Mui goes on to form her own music production company, and partners with Go East Entertainment and Music Nation to release her forthcoming albums. With Mui's departure, Capital Artists officially goes on life support as a company.
- October 20, 2001 - Capital Artists dismisses fifteen of its employees, retaining only three. Capital discontinues music production, and remains in operation solely to collect copyright revenue and issue compilations. All contracts are nullified and the singers asked to find representation elsewhere.
- 2003 - One of Capital Artists' remaining employees discloses that continued sales of two compilation albums—Anita Mui's Love Songs (情歌), released in 1998, and an album by Eason Chan—have managed to bring in over HKD 1 million for the company, integral in keeping the company afloat. Notably, Mui's Love Songs continues to outsell other singers' original new releases at the time, five years after its initial release.
- 2004 - According to the SCMP Group's 2004 annual report, Capital Artists makes a net profit of HKD 9.4 million (US$1.2 million).
- 2004–2005 - Capital Artists releases several albums featuring songs of Leslie Cheung and Anita Mui. Among these releases are: Hits for Kidults (成人兒歌); Tribute to Anita Mui (梅 憶錄); Timeless Soundtracks (影視紅聲); and Leslie Cheung: History, His Story (張國榮/History - His Story). The recording of Mui's final concert, Classic Moment Live, becomes the year's best-selling Cantonese album, according to IFPI. Tribute to Anita Mui also makes the Top Ten. Revenue from both Tribute to Anita Mui and History, His Story is donated to two Hong Kong–based organizations, AIDS Concern and Children's Cancer Foundation.
- 2005 - According to the SCMP Group's 2005 annual report, Capital Artists makes a net profit of HKD 1.5 million (US$193,000). The Hong Kong music industry feels the effects of illegal music downloads and piracy, and many other music labels record deficits.
- April 2006 - Jacqueline Chan, Publishing Manager of Capital Artists since 2003, announces an advertisement campaign promoting previously unreleased audio tracks sung by Anita Mui. It is later revealed to be a newly restored version of Anita Mui's "final" concert in 1991–1992 when she temporarily decided to retire from concert performances. The concert was never released in her lifetime, in accordance with her wishes, and previously, only some members of her fan club received a VHS copy of the concert as a memento.
- 2008 - Lai Sun Development chairman Peter Lam announces that he will purchase Capital Artists on behalf of eSun Holdings, a subsidiary of Lai Sun Development, for the price of HKD 88 million (US$11 million). Some Old Song collections album are released in the entity will be called "東亞+華星", a combination of the names for East Asia Music (東亞唱片) and Capital Artists (華星唱片). In this form, Capital Artists will once again create music.
- December 2008 - Peter Lam puts on a concert in celebration of the recent merger, the East Asia Capital Artists Concert (東亞華星演唱會), at AsiaWorld–Expo, one of the major convention centers in Hong Kong. The concert, dedicated to deceased Capital Artists singers Anita Mui, Leslie Cheung, and Roman Tam, features the talents of many singers previously under contract with Capital, as well as some of the biggest names at Amusic. In conjunction with the concert, the new company releases a three-CD, one-DVD compilation of Anita Mui's biggest hits. The compilation box-set, titled Faithfully, sells over 40,000 copies within two weeks. (As a point of reference, Hong Kong's best-selling album for 2008 sold 58,000 copies during the entire year.) The album remains on the Top Ten list for over 11 weeks. IFPI reported later that "Faithfully" and Leslie Cheung's compilation box set both made it to the top 10 in sales for the year.
- May 2010 - Capital Artists is relabeled.

== List of singers ==
=== Male singers ===
List of male Capital Artists singers
Singer	Year signed	Year separated	Reason for separation	New company	Notes
Bill Chan	1971	[Unknown]	†	Crown Records (娛樂唱片)	Signed with Crown in 1977
Roman Tam	1974	1989	†	EMI	
Leslie Cheung	1982	1986	†	PolyGram	
David Lui 呂方	1984	1990	†	Warner Music	
Andy Lau	1985	1985	†	EMI	Signed with EMI in 1986
Tony Leung Chiu-wai	1985	1992	†	Music Impact (藝能動音)	Signed with Music Impact in 1994
Jackie Chan	1986	1989	†	Rock Records	
Alex To	1986	1990	†	Rock Records	
Andy Hui	1986	1997	†	Go East (正東唱片)	
Adam Cheng	1987	1987	†	Crown Records	
Leon Lai	1987	1990	†	PolyGram	
William So	1987	1987	†	Time Record (時代唱片)	Signed with Time in 1988; Rejoined Capital Artists in 2011
Anthony Lun	1988	1990	†	Golden Pony (嘉音唱片)	
Patrick Tam Yiu Man	1989	1994	Dissolved contract with Capital	Colorway Records (力圖唱片)	Signed with Colorway in 1996
Edmond Leung	1989	2001	Capital stopped recording music	Gold Label Records	Signed with Gold Label in 2003
Tsui Chun Tung 徐鎮東	1990	1993	Retired from music industry	-	
Aaron Kwok	1991	1993	†	Warner Music	
Chang Kuan 常寬	1992	1992	Retired from music industry	-	Retired in 1993
Phil Chang	1993	1994	†	EMI Taiwan (科藝百代)	Signed with EMI Taiwan in 1995
Michael Tong Man Lung 唐文龍	1994	1996	†	Pony Canyon	
Gabriel Harrison 海俊傑	1994	1997	Retired from music industry	-	
Eason Chan	1995	2000	†	EEG	
Cheung Ming-man	1997	1997	Retired from music industry	-	
Wilfred Lau	1997	2001	Capital stopped recording music	Go East	Signed with Go East in 2004
Louis Koo	1998	2001	†	MusicNationGroup (大國文化)	
Patrick Tang	1998	2001	†	Go East	
Ho Yin Leung 梁浩賢	2000	2001	Retired from music industry	Snazz (潮藝娛樂)	Retired 2002-2006; Signed with Snazz in 2006
William So					
Edmond Leung					

=== Female singers ===
List of female Capital Artists singers
Singer	Year signed	Year separated	Reason for separation	New company	Notes
Lydia Shum	1971	1971	†	Life Records (麗風唱片)	Deceased
Lydia Shum	1982	1983	†	Crown Records (娛樂唱片)	Deceased
Angie Chiu	1971	Unknown	Unknown	Unknown	
Louise Lee	1971	Unknown	†	Unknown	
Agnes Chan	1982	1984	Retired from music industry	-	
Anita Mui	1982	1997	†	Music Impact (藝能動音) (for Mandarin albums)	Deceased
Anita Mui	1982	2001	†	MusicNationGroup (大國文化) (for Cantonese albums)	Deceased
Elisa Chan 陳潔靈	1982	1986	†	Warner Music	
Liza Wang	1983	1984	†	Crown Records	
Susanna Kwan	1985	1987	Retired from music industry	-	
Pui Ling Man 文佩玲	1986	1988	†	EMI	
Jenny Tseng	1987	1988	†	Sony Music Hong Kong (新力音樂 (香港))	
Elvina Kong	1988	1990	Retired from music industry	-	
Gina Lam 林楚麒	1988	1990	Retired from music industry	Go East (正東唱片)	Came out of retirement in 1996
Sammi Cheng	1989	1995	†	Warner Music	
Sandy Lam	1992	1994	†	Rock Records	
Stephanie Che	1992	1995	Dissolved contract with Capital	Music Impact	Signed with Music Impact in 1996
Bak Ka-Sin 白嘉倩	1993	1993	Dissolved contract with Capital	-	
Mao A Min	1993	1994	Retired from music industry	-	
Coco Lee	1993	1996	†	Sony Music Hong Kong	Deceased
Tai Yan Ling 戴恩玲	1994	1996	Retired from music industry	-	
Kathy Chow Hoi-Mei	1995	1997	Retired from music industry	-	Capital contract applied only to Hong Kong. Forward Music (豐華唱片) acted as agent and record label in Taiwan. Deceased
Donna Chu 朱潔儀	1995	1997	Retired from music industry	-	
Chen Yi 陳奕	1995	1997		-	
Miriam Yeung	1996	2001	†	Cinepoly	
Miriam Yeung	2010				
Josie Ho	1996	1997	Dissolved contract with Capital	Amusic	
Denise Ho	1996	2001	†	EMI	
Cindy Au	1997	2001	Capital stopped recording music	-	

=== Singing groups ===
List of Capital Artists singing groups
Chinese	English	Year signed	Year separated	Reason for separation	New company	Notes
小虎隊	Little Tiger Squad ‡	1982	1984	Retired from music industry	-	
張崇基 張崇德	Cheung Shung-Kei Cheung Shung-Tak	1993	1995	Dissolved contract with Capital	Pony Canyon	Signed with Pony Canyon in 2001

† Artist signed with a different label.

‡ No official English name could be found. This is a direct translation.
