= Fan Bingbing filmography =

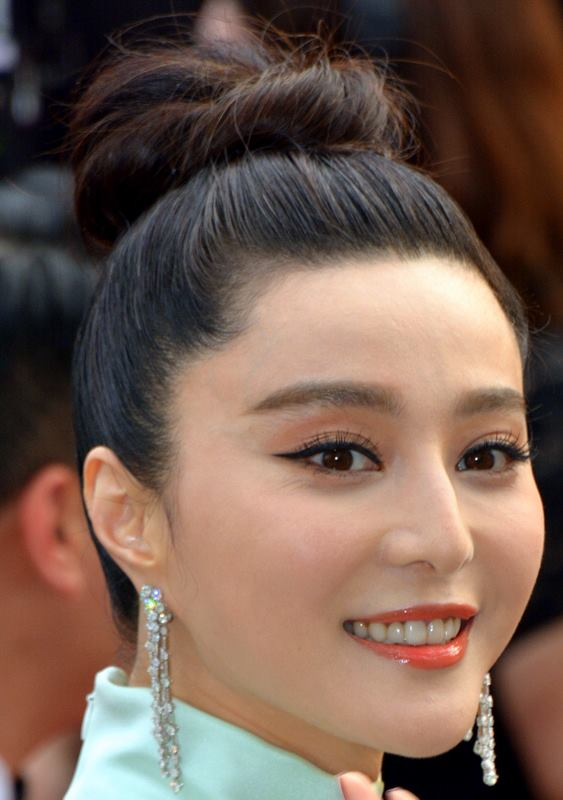
- Fan in 2017
- Film: 50
- Television series: 45

Fan Bingbing is a Chinese actress and producer.

== Film ==
Year	Title	Role	Notes	Ref.
2001	Reunion 手足情	Zhang Yanqing		
2002	Fall in Love at First Sight 一见钟情	Jiu Jiu		
2002	The Lion Roars	Princess Ping'an		
2003	Dragon Laws I: The Undercover 卧底威龙	Yu Feng		
2003	Cell Phone	Wu Yue		
2004	The Twins Effect II	Red Vulture		
2005	A Chinese Tall Story	Princess Xiaoshan		
2006	A Battle of Wits	Yiyue		
2007	The Matrimony	Xu Manli		
2007	Call for Love	Chen Xiaoyu	Cameo	
2007	Sweet Revenge 寄生人	Cheung Yung		
2007	Lost in Beijing	Liu Pingguo		
2007	Flash Point	Julie		
2007	Contract Lover 合约情人	Liu Zao		
2007	Crossed Lines	Ning Can/Xin Ran		
2008	Kung Fu Hip-Hop 精舞门	Tina		
2008	Home Run 回家的路	Tian Cong		
2008	Desires of the Heart	Zhang Ying	Cameo	
2009	Shinjuku Incident	Lily		
2009	Sophie's Revenge	Joanna Wang Jingjing		
2009	Wheat	Li		
2009	Bodyguards and Assassins	Yueru		
2010	Future X-Cops	Meili / Milie	Cameo	
2010	East Wind Rain 东风雨	Huanyan		
2010	Chongqing Blues	Zhu Qing	Cameo	
2010	Sacrifice	Princess Zhuang		
2011	Stretch	Pamsy		
2011	Shaolin	Yan Xi	Co-producer	
2011	Buddha Mountain	Nan Feng		
2011	The Founding of a Party	Empress Dowager Longyu	Cameo	
2011	My Way	Shi-rai		
2012	Double Xposure	Song Qi		
2012	Lost in Thailand	Fan Bingbing	Cameo	
2013	Iron Man 3	Wu Jiaqi	Cameo	
2013	One Night Surprise	Michelle		
2014	X-Men: Days of Future Past	Clarice Fong / Blink		
2014	The White Haired Witch of Lunar Kingdom	Lian Nishang		
2015	Ever Since We Love	Liu Qing		
2015	Lady of the Dynasty	Yang Guifei		
2016	Skiptrace	Bai		
2016	League of Gods	Daji		
2016	I Am Not Madame Bovary	Li Xuelian		
2016	L.O.R.D: Legend of Ravaging Dynasties	Guishan Lianquan		
2017	Sky Hunter	Zhao Yali		
2017	The Lady in the Portrait 画框女人	Empress Ula Nara		
2018	The Faces of My Gene		Cameo	
2018	Air Strike	Ye Peixuan	Cameo	
2022	The 355	Lin Mi Sheng		
2022	The King's Daughter	The Mermaid		
2023	Green Night 绿夜	Jinsha		
2025	Ice Road: Vengeance	Dhani		
2025	Mother Bhumi	Hong Im		
2026	Diary of a Mad Old Man			
TBA	The Perfect Blue 她杀	Liu Mei		

== Television ==
Year	Title	Role	Notes	Ref.
1996	Powerful Woman 女强人	Zhao Bin's fiancé		
1998	Master Ma	Bai Xiaodie; Ma Suzhen		
1998	My Fair Princess	Jin Suo		
1998	The Scary Folktales - Black Moth 乡野传奇之大黑蛾	Huniu	Alternative Chinese title: Strange Talk (聊斋怪谈)	
1998	The Act of the Youngs 青春出动	Huang Xiaoduo		
1999	Master of Zen 达摩祖师	A'si		
1999	My Fair Princess II	Jin Suo		
1999	Legend of Dagger Li 小李飞刀	Xing'er		
2000	Storm in Zhongguan Village 中关村风云	Su Xue'er	Alternative Chinese title: Heihun (黑魂)	
2001	The Book of Love 爱情宝典之救风尘	Song Yinzhang		
2001	The Story of the Past 风雨步高苑	Lin Siyuan	Alternative Chinese title: Hongchen Wangshi (红尘往事)	
2001	Floating in Chaos 乱世飘萍	Fenghuang Nü; Run Ge'er; Run Tianhong		
2001	The Kitchen God 人间灶王	Princess Hongyan		
2002	Young Justice Bao II 少年包青天2	Little Dragonfly		
2002	Homeward Bound 情缘的天空	Ma Jiahui	Alternative Chinese title: Geiwo Yige Ma (给我一个妈)	
2002	The Great Qing Empire	Lü Siniang	Guest appearance Alternative Chinese title: Da Qing Diguo (大清帝国)	
2002	Sweetheart of the Palace 皇宫宝贝	Shangguan Xueru	Guest appearance	
2003	Flying Dragon - the Special Unit 特警飞龙	Yu Feng		
2003	Famous Catcher in Kanto 名捕镇关东	Princess Ning'an		
2003	The Legend of the Treasure Basin 聚宝盆	Zhao Xue'er	Guest appearance	
2004	Heroic Legend 萍踪侠影	Yunlei		
2004	Lucky Zhu Bajie 福星高照猪八戒之老鼠爱上猪	Hued Rat		
2004	Red Poppies 尘埃落定	Tana		
2004	Princess Enuo 婀娜公主	Princess Enuo		
2004	No. 4 Female Prison 四号女监	Chen Yu	Alternative Chinese title: Di San Ke Zidan (第三颗子弹)	
2004	Mu Guiying 巾帼英雄穆桂英	Wang Lijun		
2005	Soaring Ambition Justice Bao 凌云壮志包青天	Yelü Aoxue	Alternative Chinese title: Jianlin Tianxia (剑临天下)	
2005	The Proud Twins	Tie Xinlan		
2006	Eight Heroes	Chu Xiangxiang	Guest appearance	
2006	The Legend and the Hero	Daji		
2006	Library 天一生水	Fan Yunlian		
2006	A Beautiful New World 美丽新天地	Cheng Lin		
2006	Explosion 大爆炸	Luo Xiao	Alternative Chinese title: Tufa Shijian (突发事件)	
2006	Qin Shi Huang	Princess A'ruo		
2007	Da Tang Fu Rong Yuan	Yang Guifei		
2007	The Legend and the Hero	Daji		
2007	War and Destiny	Jin Nuannuan	Guest appearance	
2008	Rouge Snow 胭脂雪	Wen Yuhe	Also producer	
2008	An Angel Will Love You for Me 会有天使替我爱你	Fan Wenxing	Guest appearance	
2009	Human Love 人间情缘	Gan Lu	Guest appearance	
2009	The Last Night of Madam Chin 金大班的最后一夜	Jin Zhaoli	Also producer Alternative Chinese title: Madam Chin (金大班)	
2014	The Empress of China	Wu Zetian	Also producer	
2015	Diors Man 屌丝男士4	Beauty	Cameo	
2022	Insider	Lam	Special appearance; Korean drama	
TBA	The Legend of Ba Qing 巴清传	Ba Qing		
