= Keep Running season 12 =

2024 season of Chinese television series

Keep Running
- Season 12
- Poster for Season 12
- Starring: Li Chen; Zheng Kai; Sha Yi; Bai Lu; Zhou Shen; Fan Chengcheng; Yuqi; Zhang Zhenyuan
- No. of episodes: 12

Release
- Original network: ZRTG: Zhejiang Television
- Original release: April 19 – July 12, 2024

Season chronology
- ← Previous; Nature Season Next → The Ancient Tea Horse Road

This is a list of episodes of the Chinese variety show Keep Running in season 12. The show airs on Zhejiang Television. The regular lineup returned with the addition of Zhang Zhenyuan from TNT as a permanent member, who made his debut in the Nature Season.

== List of episodes ==
List of episodes (episode 163–174)
(Series) Episode #	(Season) Episode #	Broadcast Date	Guest(s)	Landmark	Teams	Mission	Results	Name Tag Battle Results	
0	12/00	19 April 2024	Liu Tao, Yang Tianzhen	Nanning, Guangxi	No initial teams, individual competition	Complete the fruit market live streaming challenges and complete baseline negotiations to accumulate trade capital.	Preview Faction WINS Initial capital parameters processed for the Nanning corporate market arc.	N/A, did not play	
163	12/01	26 April 2024	Liu Tao, Yang Tianzhen	Nanning, Guangxi	No initial teams, individual competition	Complete business partnership challenges to accumulate capital and secure the premier trade designation indices.	Winning faction finalized High-stakes corporate financial negotiation sequences successfully verified.	N/A, did not play	
164	12/02	3 May 2024	Zhang Yifan, Zheng Yecheng	Nanning, Guangxi	Red Faction Blue Faction	Investigate the sealed puppet mystery chronicle to purge infiltrators and confirm alignment matrices.	Red Faction WINS Elimination matrices successfully resolved by surviving red operatives.	Red Faction; *Winning Members	Active tactical eliminations completed
165	12/03	10 May 2024	Ao Ruipeng, GAI, Miao Miao, Sun Qian, Sean Sun	Chongqing	Family team structures	Engage in the retro family carnival contest to fulfill historical sports baseline metrics.	Family Alliance WINS Multi-generational sports metrics and team cooperation thresholds met.	N/A, did not play	
166	12/04	17 May 2024	Jiang Long, Qiao Shan	Shenyang, Liaoning	Craftsman preservation units	Compete in ancient craft masterwork evaluations to synchronize the final float parade logistics.	Preservation Team WINS Cultural preservation team successfully coordinates final parade sequences.	N/A, did not play	
167	12/05	24 May 2024	Chen Zheyuan, Zhang Ruonan	Wuzhen, Zhejiang	Logistics distribution units	Execute the spatial distribution run to extract and secure the tracking coordinates of the "Golden Key".	Logistics Units WIN Special distribution units complete security verification protocol.	N/A, played a variation where name tags dictated security level access keys.	
168	12/06	7 June 2024	Cai Guoqing, Tim Huang, Ariel Lin, Wei Daxun	Huzhou, Zhejiang	Secret camp squads	Navigate the hidden terrain boundaries during the "Run into the Unknown" wilderness operational strategy.	Active Squad WINS Survival and tracking indices processed successfully by the active squad.	N/A, played a variation where name tags tracked radar detection intervals.	
169	12/07	14 June 2024	Sie Yi-lin, Yu Yang	Suzhou, Jiangsu	Workplace production divisions	Complete simulated operations within the industrial plant ecosystem to optimize corporate metrics.	Management Division WINS Management team meets daily production optimization targets.	N/A, did not play	
170	12/08	21 June 2024	Allen Su, Shen Xiaoting, Wei Daxun, Joey Yung	Hangzhou, Zhejiang	Vocal performer alliances	Advance through the sound elite audition phases to satisfy musical harmony validation parameters.	Vocal Alliance WINS Vocal alliance satisfies baseline performance requirements.	N/A, did not play	
171	12/09	28 June 2024	Curley G, Zhang Hao, Ricky, Duan Xiaowei	Nanjing, Jiangsu	Urban tracking search units	Conduct a 100-player massive urban hide-and-seek grid sweep to pinpoint high-value target assets.	Search Units WIN Core search units successfully capture target entity coordinates.	Played a wide-area tracking variation where ripping tags exposed hidden grid coordinates.	
172	12/10	5 July 2024	Wang Hedi	Taizhou, Zhejiang	Card collector factions	Execute high-priority acquisition profiles under the "Keep Running" collector card plan framework.	Collector Faction WINS Faction wins gold card prizes after clearing redemption criteria.	N/A, did not play	
173	12/11	12 July 2024	Joe Chen, Song Yanfei	Budapest, Hungary	International cultural delegations	Establish cross-border exchange protocols and pass spicy culinary verification matrices.	Delegation Success Spicy challenge matrices checked; national porcelain items secured.	N/A, did not play	
174	12/12	19 July 2024	Su Bingtian	Budapest, Hungary	Red Team: Li Chen, Su Bingtian; Yellow Team: Zheng Kai, Song Yuqi; Green Team: Sha Yi, Wei Daxun; Pink Team: Bai Lu, Fan Chengcheng; Purple Team: Zhou Shen, Zhang Zhenyuan	Compete inside Groupama Arena in an ultimate tactical name-tag battle using specialized "Supernatural Abilities".	Yellow Team WINS Yellow Team claims the final Pure Gold Medals. Zheng Kai gifted his medal to guest star Su Bingtian.	Yellow Team: Zheng Kai; Song Yuqi	Other Factions: Zhou Shen (OUT); Fan Chengcheng (OUT); Su Bingtian (OUT); Sha Yi (OUT); Wei Daxun (OUT); Li Chen (OUT); Bai Lu (OUT); Zhang Zhenyuan (OUT) (Used "Rematch" ability to revive but was eliminated)
