= Hongfu =

Ancient Chinese female singer

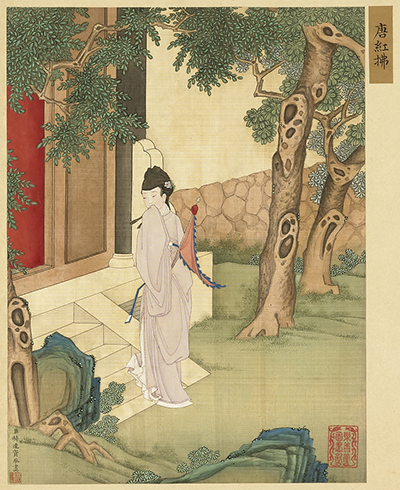
- Hongfu as depicted in the album Gathering Gems of Beauty (畫麗珠萃秀), Qing dynasty
- Born: Zhang Chuchen
- Died: 640
- Occupation(s): courtesan, warrior
- Partner: Li Jing

Hongfu (simplified Chinese: 红拂; traditional Chinese: 紅拂; pinyin: Hóngfú; lit. 'Red Sleeves') is a legendary Chinese folk heroine from imperial China whose birth name was Zhang Chuchen (張出塵, alternatively 張初塵). She was purported to have lived during the Transition from Sui to Tang and was originally described in Biography of the Dragon-Beard Man from the Tang dynasty. She was a courtesan in the family of Sui dynasty minister Yang Su and eloped with Li Jing, an ally and future general of future Tang emperor Li Shimin. Hongfu, along with Li Jing and the "Dragon Beard Man," Qiu Ranke, are known as the "Three Heroes of the Wind and Dust" (風塵三俠). She was one of the few female martial arts masters.

== Legend ==
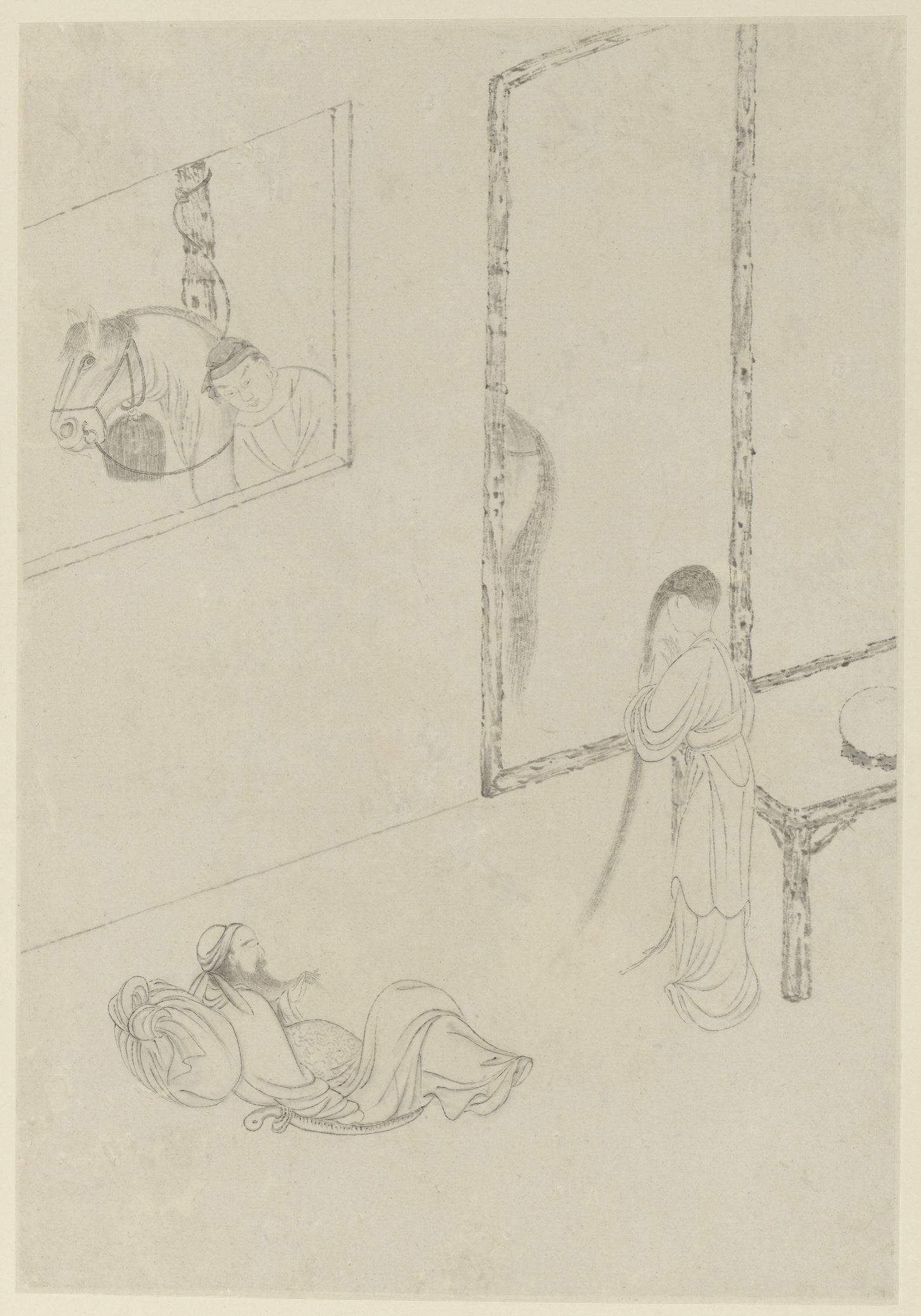
As depicted in the album Famous Woman (列女圖), 1799

Born Zhang Chuchen, her parents were from southern China who migrated north to Chang'an in the unification wars of the Sui dynasty. Zhang became a courtesan in the family of Sui minister Yang Su, where she specialized in song and dance. Because she often wore red, she became known as Hongfu, or Red Sleeves. According to legend, she saw Li Jing when he came to petition Yang Su to address the grievances of the common people. Zhang fell in love with Li and eloped with him.

Hongfu and Li Jing first allied themselves with Qiu Ranke to overthrow the Sui dynasty, becoming the Three Heroes of the Wind and Dust. After meeting future emperor Li Shimin, Qiu Ranke forsook this ambition. Hongfu and Li Jing allied themselves with Li Shimin and helped Li Shimin and his father Li Yuan establish the Tang dynasty. Qiu Ranke on went to establish his own kingdom of Fusu (alternatively, Fuyu) to the southeast.

Hongfu and Li Jing lived together as wife and husband until she died of illness in AD 640. Li Jing, then 70 years of age, survived her by nine years.

== In popular culture ==
The story of Hongfu first appears in the Tang dynasty book Biography of the Dragon-Beard Man by Du Guangting. She is also alluded to in Dream of the Red Chamber when Lin Daiyu is compared to Hongfu.

Hongfu is also one of the main characters in the 1966 novel Heroes of the Red Dust (風塵三俠) by author Gao Yang.

In 1998, actress Angela Pan portrayed Hongfu in the television series, Qiu Ranke and Hong Fu Nü.

In 2006, Taiwanese actress Shu Qi portrayed Hongfu in the television series Romance of Red Dust (風塵三俠之紅拂女).

== Bibliography ==
- Du, Shanshan; Chen, Ya-chen (2013). Women and Gender in Contemporary Chinese Societies: Beyond Han Patriarchy. Lexington Books. ISBN 9780739145821.
