= 34th Singapore International Film Festival =

2023 film festival

- Opening film: Tiger Stripes by Amanda Nell Eu
- Location: Singapore
- No. of films: 105
- Festival date: 30 November–10 December 2023
- Website: sgiff.com

Singapore International Film Festival
- 35th 33rd

The 34th annual Singapore International Film Festival was held from 30 November to 10 December 2023 in Singapore. A total of 101 films from 50 countries were screened during the festival. With two co-productions and three feature films, this year broke the record for the highest number of films selected in competition by Singaporean directors since 1997. Amanda Nell Eu's feature directorial debut Tiger Stripes opened the festival. Drama film Inside the Yellow Cocoon Shell won the festival's main award Silver Screen Award for Best Asian Film.

== Official selection ==
=== Opening film ===
English title	Original title	Director(s)	Production countrie(s)
Tiger Stripes		Amanda Nell Eu	Malaysia, Taiwan, Singapore, France, Germany, Netherlands, Indonesia, Qatar

=== Icon In Focus: Fan Bingbing ===
English title	Original title	Director(s)	Production countrie(s)
Buddha Mountain (2010)	观音山	Li Yu	China
Double Xposure (2012)	二次曝光	Li Yu	China
Green Night (2023)		Han Shuai	Hong Kong

=== Asian Feature Film Competition ===
English title	Original title	Director(s)	Production countrie(s)
A Journey In Spring	春行	Tzu-Hui Peng, Ping-Wen Wang	Taiwan
Critical Zone	منطقه بحرانی	Ali Ahmadzadeh	Iran, Germany
Dreaming & Dying	好久不见	Nelson Yeo	Singapore, Indonesia
Hesitation Wound	Tereddüt Çizgisi	Selman Nacar	Turkey, France, Romania, Spain
Inside the Yellow Cocoon Shell	Bên trong vỏ kén vàng	Phạm Thiên Ân	Vietnam, Singapore, France, Spain
Last Shadow at First Light		Nicole Midori Woodford	Singapore, Japan, Philippines, Slovenia, Indonesia
Monisme		Riar Rizaldi	Indonesia, Qatar
Morrison		Phuttiphong Aroonpheng	Thailand, France
Snow in Midsummer	五月雪	Chong Keat Aun	Malaysia, Singapore, Taiwan
The Tenants	세입자	Yoon Eun-kyung	South Korea
Tomorrow Is a Long Time	明天比昨天长久	Jow Zhi Wei	Singapore, Taiwan, France, Portugal
Valli		Manoj Shinde	India

=== Singapore Panorama ===
English title	Original title	Director(s)	Production countrie(s)
My Endless Numbered Days	まだまだ	Shaun Neo	Japan, Singapore
The Road Less Travelled (1997)	轨道	Lim Suat Yen	Singapore
Sunday		Sean Ng	Singapore
Wonderland	乐园	Chai Yee Wei	Singapore
A Year of No Significance	大风吹	Kelvin Tong	Singapore, Malaysia

=== Foreground ===
English title	Original title	Director(s)	Production countrie(s)
24 Hours with Gaspar	24 Jam Bersama Gaspar	Yosep Anggi Noen	Indonesia
A Normal Family	보통의 가족	Hur Jin-ho	South Korea
All of Us Strangers		Andrew Haigh	United Kingdom
Art College 1994	艺术学院1994	Liu Jiang	China
La chimera		Alice Rohrwacher	Italy, France, Switzerland
Poor Things		Yorgos Lanthimos	United States, United Kingdom, Ireland

=== Altitude ===
English title	Original title	Director(s)	Production countrie(s)
About Dry Grasses	Kuru Otlar Üstüne	Nuri Bilge Ceylan	Turkey, France, Germany
Afire	Roter Himmel	Christian Petzold	Germany
Essential Truths of the Lake		Lav Diaz	Philippines, France, Portugal, Italy, Switzerland, United Kingdom, Singapore
Evil Does Not Exist	悪は存在しない	Ryusuke Hamaguchi	Japan
Fallen Leaves	Kuolleet lehdet	Aki Kaurismäki	Finland
Music		Angela Schanelec	Germany, France, Serbia
The Shadowless Tower	白塔之光	Zhang Lü	China
Youth (Spring)	青春	Wang Bing	France, Luxembourg, Netherlands

=== Horizon ===
English title	Original title	Director(s)	Production countrie(s)
The Delinquents	Los delincuentes	Rodrigo Moreno	Argentina, Brazil, Chile, Luxembourg
Drift		Anthony Chen	France, United Kingdom, Greece
The Feeling That the Time for Doing Something Has Passed		Joanna Arnow	United States
Goodbye Julia	وداعا جوليا	Mohamed Kordofani	Sudan, Egypt, Germany, France, Saudi Arabia, Sweden
Hours of Ours	รอวัน	Komtouch Napattaloong	Thailand
In the Blind Spot	Im toten Winkel	Ayşe Polat	Germany
Nowhere Near		Miko Revereza	Philippines, Mexico
Omen	Augure	Baloji	Democratic Republic of the Congo, Netherlands, France, Belgium, Germany, South Africa
Slow	Tu man nieko neprimeni	Marija Kavtaradzė	Lithuania, Spain, Sweden
Stolen		Karan Tejpal	India
Tótem		Lila Avilés	Mexico, Denmark, France

=== Standpoint ===
English title	Original title	Director(s)	Production countrie(s)
Ghosts of Kalantiaw		Chuck Escasa	Philippines
Maryam	Maryam Pagi Ke Malam	Badrul Hisham Ismail	Malaysia
The Mother of All Lies	كذب أبيض	Asmae El Moudir	Morocco, Egypt, Qatar, Saudi Arabia
Our Body	Notre corps	Claire Simon	France
Rosinha and Other Wild Animals	Rosinha e Outros Bichos do Mato	Marta Pessoa	Portugal
Tedious Days and Nights	混乱与细雨	Guo Zhenming	China
Ten Years Myanmar		Thaiddhi, Nay Wunn Ni, Myo Thar Khin, Aung Min, Lamin Oo	Myanmar

=== Landmark ===
English title	Original title	Director(s)	Production countrie(s)
Ishanou (1991)		Aribam Syam Sharma	India
Mandabi (1968)		Ousmane Sembène	Senegal
The Stranger and the Fog (1974)	غریبه و مه	Bahram Beyzai	Iran
Twin Peaks: Fire Walk with Me (1992)		David Lynch	United States
Werckmeister Harmonies (2000)	Werckmeister harmóniák	Béla Tarr, Ágnes Hranitzky	Hungary, France, Germany, Italy

== Awards ==
The following awards were presented at the festival:

Asian Feature Film Competition

- Best Asian Feature: Inside the Yellow Cocoon Shell by Phạm Thiên Ân
  - Special Mention: Dreaming & Dying by Nelson Yeo
- Best Performance: Yang Kuei-mei for A Journey In Spring
- Best Director: Yoon Eun-kyung for The Tenants
- Best Screenplay: Yu Yi-hsun for A Journey In Spring
- FIPRESCI Award: The Tenants

=== Cinema Icon Award ===
- Fan Bingbing

=== Outstanding Contribution to Southeast Asian Cinema Award ===
- White Light Post
