= Romance of Red Dust =

2006 Chinese TV series

- DVD cover art
- Also known as: The Three Musketeers; The Lady in Red
- 风尘三侠之红拂女
- Genre: Wuxia
- Based on: Qiuranke Zhuan by Du Guangting
- Directed by: Chui Po-chu; Hou Jiyuan; Ren Haitao
- Presented by: Zhang Xiaowu; Pu Shulin; Ma Zhongjun; Tie Fo
- Starring: Shu Qi; Wallace Huo; Yu Rongguang; Li Junfeng; Hou Yong; Kwong Wa; Kent Cheng; Yvonne Yao
- Opening theme: "Red Dust" (红尘) by Lee E-jun
- Ending theme: "Really" (真的) by Angela Chang
- Country of origin: China
- Original language: Mandarin
- No. of episodes: 30

Production
- Executive producer: Wang Ziming
- Producer: Lin Qiang
- Production location: China
- Running time: ≈45 minutes per episode
- Production companies: Beijing Dongwang Culture and Development; Beijing Ciwen Film Distribution; Beijing Huaxia Media Culture Development

Original release
- Network: CTV
- Release: 2006

Romance of Red Dust (风尘三侠之红拂女), also known as The Three Musketeers and The Lady in Red, is a 2006 Chinese wuxia television series based on the Tang dynasty short story Qiuranke Zhuan (虯髯客傳; The Man with the Curly Beard) by Du Guangting. The Chinese title refers to the three main characters in the story – Hongfu (Red Sleeves), Qiuranke (Curly-Bearded Man), and Li Jing – who are respectively portrayed by Shu Qi, Yu Rongguang, and Wallace Huo. The series was first broadcast on CTV in Taiwan in 2006.

== Synopsis ==
Hongfu, a beautiful and intelligent maiden dressed in red, is also a highly-skilled martial artist serving as a courtesan to Yang Su, the war minister of the Sui dynasty. Dugu Cheng was Hongfu's first love but he had betrayed her when he presented her to Yang Su, to whom she had lost her virginity, and Hongfu had never forgiven Dugu Cheng.

When Yang Su is recruiting talents to serve under him, Li Jing comes for the trials and passes them, gaining Hongfu's admiration. When Yang Su sees that Hongfu has affections for Li Jing, he orders her to assassinate Li Jing. However, Hongfu refuses to kill Li Jing and instead helps him escape, turning against Yang Su. The two of them gradually fall in love as they evade Dugu Cheng and Baoqin, who have been sent by Yang Su to hunt them down and kill them.

Hongfu and Li Jing meet Qiuranke, who becomes sworn siblings with Hongfu despite having slight romantic feelings for her. On their way to join the Wagang rebels, they encounter Dugu Cheng and Baoqin, and both sides clash. Li Jing and Hongfu fall off a cliff into a river during the fight. Li Jing is swept away by the current but saved by Pingyang, who is romantically attracted to him. Meanwhile, Hongfu is saved by a fisherman and later encounters Pingyang's brother, Li Shimin.

Li Jing and Hongfu are bound to go through tests of their love before they eventually get together.

== Cast ==
- Shu Qi as Hongfu
- Wallace Huo as Li Jing
- Yu Rongguang as Qiuranke
- Li Junfeng as Li Shimin
- Hou Yong as Li Yuan
- Kwong Wa as Dugu Cheng
- Kent Cheng as Yang Su
- Yvonne Yao as Pingyang
- Liu Yun as Chisu
- Jia Nailiang as Yang Xuangan
- Pang Yongzhi as Cheng Yaojin
- Dong Zhihua as Li Ke
- Si Guangmin as Madam Hua
- Wang Xingkai as Li Yuanji
- Luo Xiangjin as Baoqin
