= Fan Bingbing =

Chinese actress (born 1981)

Yang Berbahagia Datuk Fan Bingbing DPSM
- 范冰冰
- Fan at the 2026 Toronto International Film Festival
- Born: 16 September 1981 (age 45); Qingdao, Shandong, China
- Education: Shanghai Xie Jin-Hengtong Star School
- Occupations: Actress; model; television producer; singer
- Years active: 1996–present
- Agent(s): Chung Chieh (1997–1999) Wang Jinghua (2000); Huayi Brothers (2001–2007); Fan Bingbing Studio (2007–), under artist representation agreements with Talent Television & Film (2011–2015; 2016–2019) International: William Morris Endeavour (2012–2016) Creative Artists Agency (2016–)
- Relatives: Fan Chengcheng (brother)

Chinese name
- Chinese: 范冰冰
Transcriptions
Standard Mandarin
- Hanyu Pinyin: Fàn Bīngbīng
- IPA: [fân píŋ.píŋ]
Yue: Cantonese
- Jyutping: Faan^{6} Bing^{1}-bing^{1}
- IPA: [fan˨ pɪŋ˥.pɪŋ˥]

Fan Bingbing (Chinese: 范冰冰, born 16 September 1981) is a Chinese actress. After gaining recognition for the costume drama My Fair Princess (1998–1999), Fan's breakthrough came with Feng Xiaogang's film Cell Phone (2003), which won her the Hundred Flowers Award for Best Actress. She followed with television series such as The Proud Twins (2004), Eight Heroes (2006), and The Empress of China (2014) while collaborating with Li Yu on art-house films such as Lost in Beijing (2007), Buddha Mountain (2011), Double Xposure (2012), and Ever Since We Love (2015). She reunited with Feng in I Am Not Madame Bovary (2016), which won her the Silver Shell for Best Actress and the Golden Rooster Award for Best Actress. Fan's international credits include My Way (2011), X-Men: Days of Future Past (2014), The 355 (2022), Ice Road: Vengeance (2025), and Mother Bhumi (2025), for which she won the Golden Horse Award for Best Leading Actress.

From 2013 to 2017, Fan was the highest-paid celebrity in the Forbes China Celebrity 100 list after ranking in the top 10 every year since 2006. She appeared on Time magazine's list of the 100 most influential people in 2017. In 2018, Fan was involved in a tax evasion case, resulting in a CN¥883 million (US$127 million) tax liability and fine, as well as her blacklisting in mainland China. She has since shifted her focus in China to her brand Fan Beauty, while pursuing an acting career overseas.

== Early life ==
Fan was born in the coastal city of Qingdao, (Note: Fan's birthplace is disputed. While Fan and her parents stated that she was born in Qingdao, her maternal grandfather claimed she was born in Yantai. "走访童年旧居亲朋好友口述：范冰冰的那点事". Sohu (in Chinese). 31 August 2006. Archived from the original on 1 February 2024.) and moved to Yantai at 6 with her parents. Her paternal grandfather was a senior officer in the naval air force from Qingdao, stationed at the Yantai Laishan Airport division, while her grandmother gave her the Chinese character bing, or "ice," to honor the family's ties to the sea. Her father, Fan Tao, a former naval serviceman, was assigned to the Yantai Radio Factory after demobilization. After marrying Zhang Chuanmei (born Zhang Meili), one of eight sisters from a large family in Yantai, the couple were transferred to the Yantai Port Authority, where both worked as cadres in the cultural division. Following Zhang's layoff, Fan resigned, and the couple started a clothing business together. During Fan's childhood, her maternal grandfather, a carpenter, often cared for her while her parents were occupied with their business. Fan has a younger brother nineteen years her junior, Fan Chengcheng. Her parents were fined for violating China's one-child policy when he was born in 2000. He was a member of boy groups Nine Percent and NEXT before pursuing a solo career mainly as an actor.

Fan grew up watching her father sing at local competitions and cultural events, sometimes in bars to supplement the family income. Her mother, passionate about dance since childhood and a former member of the Red Guards propaganda troupe, was devoted to Fan's artistic education and arranged piano and flute lessons for her. Despite academic underperformance, Fan skipped a grade in her second year of middle school and was admitted to the music talent class of Yantai No. 1 High School for her outstanding musical performance, though some sources suggested that her admission was aided by her mother's connections with the school's staff. While in middle school, Fan lived for several years in the home of her flute teacher Zhang Chunqian, a close friend of her mother from their time in the Red Guards, as her parents were occupied with their clothing business. Zhang, who also served as the high school's wind-orchestra director, encouraged Fan's artistic talent and appointed her as the orchestra's conductor.

As a young girl, Fan was captivated by the Taiwanese television drama The Empress of the Dynasty, starring Angela Pan as Wu Zetian, which gave her the early dream of, if not becoming an actress, at least being like the star. In 1995, during her second year of high school, Fan was involved in a car accident. Her parents took her to Shanghai for surgery, and she spent three months recuperating in a hospital. Back to Yantai, she learned about Shanghai Xie Jin-Hengtong School of Arts in the local newspaper. Unable to advance to her senior year for the college entrance exam due to the accident, and unwilling to repeat her second year of high school, Fan applied to the performance school, and on the day of the entrance interviews, she was noticed in the crowd by the founder and director, Xie Jin, who advanced her past the preliminary and secondary auditions straight to the final round. At 15, she joined the school's third cohort as one of its youngest students.

== Career ==
=== 1996–2006: Early work and breakthrough ===
Fan debuted in the television series Powerful Woman (1997), where she met the lead actress Leanne Liu, who recommended her for the television series My Fair Princess (1998–1999). The two seasons of costume drama, in which she plays a supporting role as a princess's handmaiden, became a runaway success and brought her recognition across the Chinese-speaking world.

On the eve of the shooting of My Fair Princess in 1997, at the age of 16, Fan signed with Chiung Yao, the Taiwanese writer and showrunner. After Fan rose to fame with the costume drama, her parents closed their clothing business and moved to Beijing to support her acting career, becoming her early agents. Fan broke up with Chiung Yao in 1999, following a high-profile contractual dispute that arose after she signed on to Jia Yun's productions without going through her agency. Fan and her mother filed for termination with the agency, which countersued Fan for unilaterally terminating the contract and demanded a compensation fee of CN¥1 million. Through court mediation, Fan settled the contract termination with the agency by paying CN¥200,000 in compensation, reportedly the life savings of her parents at the time, who had just bought a house in Beijing.

In the same year, she was promised with five TV series in three years by Jia Yun, a family friend and founder of Zhejiang Pi Ka Wang Group, a leather and furniture manufacturer which later gained prominence in entertainment business. Jia became a key supporter during the early stage of Fan's career, though her slate of television projects under his company failed to gain traction. Their relationship apparently soured after rumors circulated about a romantic or "kept" relationship between them. When Fan's contract with him expired, her family publicly accused Jia of exploiting her for self-promotion. Jia was placed on a wanted list in 2007 for "illegally absorbing public deposits," and he turned himself in in 2015.

In 1999, while shooting TV series Qingchun Chudong produced by Jia, Fan was introduced by co-actors Li Bingbing and Ren Quan to their manager Wang Jinghua, one of China's earliest and most powerful managers. In June 2000, Fan signed with Wang, and followed her next year to join in Huayi Brothers, where Wang became the head of its talent management. In 2002, Fan established Huairou Fanbingbing Film & Television Art Training School and a production and publicity company, both in the charge of her mother. In 2003, Fan starred in Feng Xiaogang's Cell Phone, which became China's highest-grossing film of the year and earned her the Hundred Flowers Award for Best Actress. Fan also appeared in films such as The Lion Roars (2002), The Twins Effect II (2004), A Chinese Tall Story (2005), and A Battle of Wits (2006), for which she received a nomination for Best Actress at the 12th Golden Bauhinia Awards. In 2006, Forbes China awarded her the Star of the Year.

Fan's tenure at Huayi Brothers, China's leading entertainment conglomerate in the 2000s, was marked by tensions between her rapidly rising stardom and the corporate machinery. Although she benefited from Huayi's strong film production network, the company's lack of adequate public-relations support and personal attention left her frustrated, particularly after her role as a mistress in Cell Phone drew increasingly negative and often salacious publicity. In 2004, she faced her first public-relations crisis when Chongqing Business Daily published an article implying her "casting-couch" transaction. Fan urged Huayi to issue an immediate statement, but the company responded only days later, leading to a newspaper retraction that came well past the news cycle. In 2006, a viral post making similar allegations appeared on Tianya. This time Fan took the initiative with the help of Mu Xiaoguang (also known as Mou Enguang), a Taiwanese businessman with reputed ties with the Four Seas Gang, who befriended Fan when he was producer of the TV series The Legend and the Hero (2007). Mu identified the posters as two middle-school students in Shaanxi Province by tracing the IP address and registration data. The two teenagers admitted to acting on instructions from another actress and issued a public apology to Fan. Fan later stated that she had identified the actress involved but chose not to disclose her name.

In 2005, Fan's powerful manager Wang Jinghua left Huayi to co-found Chengtian Entertainment, triggering an exodus of talent and a shake-up across the industry. Fan chose to remain with Huayi, reportedly persuaded by the company's promise to cast her opposite Chow Yun-fat in the historical epic A Battle of Wits (2006), though the lead role ultimately went to Andy Lau. After Wang's departure, her protégé Li Xue, sister of Li Bingbing, who also remained with Huayi, took over as Huayi's head of talent management. The unfavorable internal competition facing Fan intensified as Zhou Xun joined Huayi. Amid rumors that her contractual negotiations had broken down, Fan largely skipped the promotion of her final project with Huayi, The Matrimony (2007), which was released around the same time her contract expired.

=== 2007–2017: Heyday ===
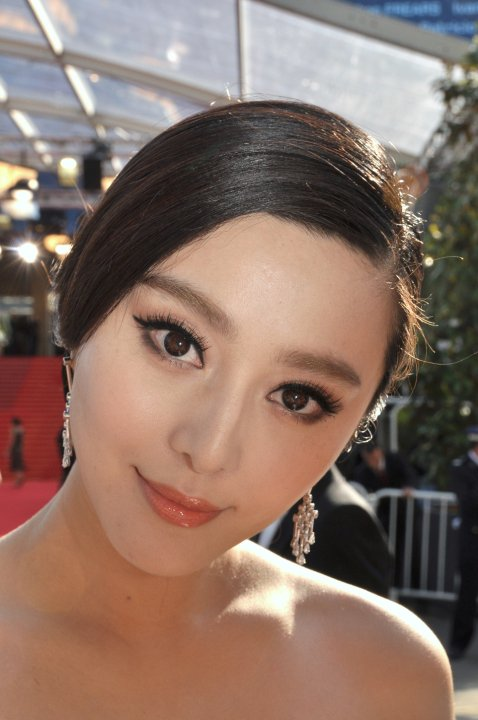
Fan in 2010

Fan left Huayi Brothers in February 2007 to establish her own Fan Bingbing Studio, a pioneering example of the one-person agency model in the Chinese entertainment industry, with Mu Xiaoguang as her manager and Yang Tianzhen as head of public relations. Fan starred in eight films in 2007, including Shinjuku Incident and Bodyguards and Assassins, the latter of which earned her a nomination for Best Supporting Actress at the 29th Hong Kong Film Awards.

Notably, Fan collaborated with director Li Yu for the first time in Lost in Beijing (2007), beginning a long-term artistic partnership and close friendship. The film, one of the most high-profile cases challenging Chinese film censorship, was selected for the main competition of the 57th Berlin International Film Festival. In response to the submission of its uncensored version to the festival without prior approval, Chinese authorities blocked its domestic release, which had originally been scheduled for May 2007. It was also submitted for consideration at the 44th Golden Horse Awards, but later withdrawn under pressure from Beijing, which that year barred films solely financed by mainland Chinese companies from competing for the Taiwanese awards. According to that year's Golden Horse chair, Peggy Chiao, Lost in Beijing would have received seven nominations had it not been withdrawn. Fan was still nominated for and won Best Supporting Actress for her role in The Matrimony, though she did not attend the ceremony. In late 2007, a censored version of Lost in Beijing was finally cleared for release in China, but it had only a brief theatrical run before being pulled from cinemas and banned in early 2008.

One of the prominent shifts in Fan's independent era was her team's painstaking effort to rebuild relations with the media, transforming her from one of China's most reviled—and often misogynistically targeted—celebrities into one of its most media-savvy figures. Mu Xiaoguang, known for his fiercely protective attitude toward Fan, financed two television dramas to repair her public image: Rouge Snow (2008), written by Yu Zheng, and Jintai-Pan (2009), adapted from Pai Hsien-yung's novel of the same name. Both were female-led stories centered on virtuous, resilient women. In Jintai-Pan, the morally complex nightclub dancer, one of Pai's best-known characters, was rewritten into a traditionally "positive" figure embodying chastity and perseverance. Though the change drew mixed reviews, it reflected Mu's determination to "set Fan straight." The two projects also marked the beginning of Fan's long-term collaboration with co-producer Talent Television & Film Co., Ltd., of which Zhao Wei was a founding member.

The year 2010 marked a leap forward in Fan's career. She earned the Best Actress Award for her performance in Buddha Mountain at the 23rd Tokyo International Film Festival. But most memorably, the year was defined by her appearance at the 63rd Cannes Film Festival, where she created a sensation in China with her red carpet gown inspired by a dragon robe, historically worn by Chinese emperors. The now-iconic ensemble not only cemented her image as an unapologetically ambitious and self-assured woman, but also heralded a new phase in her career, when she fully embraced the power of publicity and image-making. Throughout the 2010s, Fan maintained one of the highest public profiles in China, owing largely to her striking, fashion-forward appearances at international film festivals, often as a brand ambassador rather than for a competing film. Her unconventional path to success attracted both admiration and derision, with critics dubbing her a "carpet star" for a career built more on glamour than on work.

"You can love me to death, or hate me to death, but you can't say you feel nothing about me."

— Fan in 2012

In 2011, Fan starred in the martial arts film Shaolin alongside Andy Lau and Jackie Chan and The Founding of a Party, which was released to mark the 90th anniversary of the Chinese Communist Party. In May, she appeared at the 64th Cannes Film Festival to promote My Way. In October, she became a member of the International Competition Jury of the 24th Tokyo International Film Festival. That same year, Fan signed a four-year artist representation agreement with Talent Film and Television. Under the deal, Talent acted as Fan's exclusive agent for television projects, and Fan became a major shareholder of Talent.

For the first half of 2012, Fan attended many fashion shows in Paris. On 16 May, she attended the opening ceremony of the 65th Cannes Film Festival as the only East Asian global spokesperson on behalf of L'Oréal Paris. In the film Double Xposure, which was released in China on 29 September, she portrays a girl who, after suffering trauma during childhood, experiences visual hallucinations after witnessing her father kill her mother. Most film critics praised Fan's performance, and she won Best Actress at the 2013 Huading Awards. The film was a financial success, with a domestic gross of more than CN¥100 million, which broke the box office record for a domestic art film in China. On 12 December, Fan made an unpaid surprise cameo in Lost in Thailand in support her first-time filmmaker friend, Xu Zheng. The film broke the box office record for Chinese films in China.

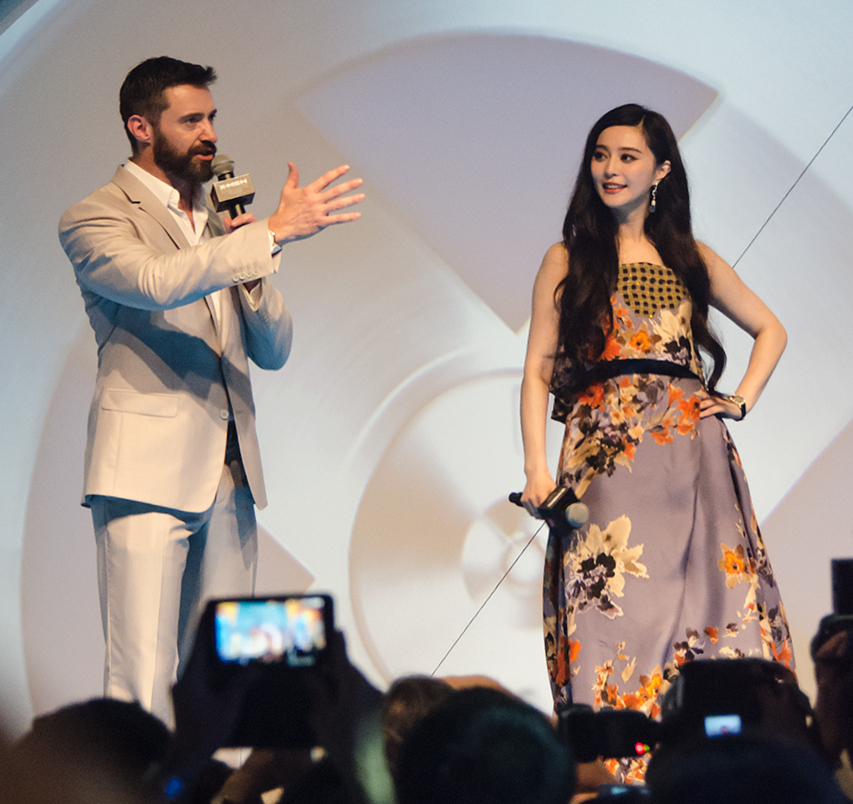
Fan and Hugh Jackman at the premiere for X-Men: Days of Future Past in 2014

In 2013, Fan appeared as Dr. Wu's assistant, Wu Jiaqi, in the mainland Chinese version of Iron Man 3, which was released on 1 May. The same year, she starred alongside Aarif Rahman in the romantic comedy One Night Surprise, which aired on Chinese Valentine's Day. The low-budget film became a commercial success and received positive reviews. On 9 December 2013, the Chinese e-commerce giant Alibaba Group's B2C business Taobao announced that Fan topped the list of the most valuable celebrities for boosting online business and said that Fan influenced approximately US$74 million in sales on its ecommerce website. On 22 December, Fan received the Best Actress Award and the Hottest Figure Award at the Baidu Hot Ceremony. In 2014, Fan portrayed the mutant Blink (Clarice Ferguson) in X-Men: Days of Future Past. She also announced that she has a four-film contract with 20th Century Fox, yet she has not appeared in another X-Men film since. On 31 May, Barbie announced the launch of the Fan Bingbing Celebrity Specialty doll in Shanghai. Louis Vuitton also chose Fan as the first Asian actress to be provided with a specially tailored dress for their red carpet.

The historical television drama The Empress of China (2014) marked the third time Fan served as both producer and lead actor. Across the 82-episode series, she plays the titular Wu Zetian, the only female emperor in Chinese history, from her teenage years to old age. As a pet project of Fan, inspired by her childhood crush on Angela Pan's Wu Zetian, the project took seven years to develop and eight months to film. It aired on Hunan Television from 21 December 2014 to 5 February 2015. The drama was briefly pulled off-air midway through its broadcast before being re-edited to remove cleavage-revealing costumes, though befitting of the Tang dynasty. It received mixed reviews but was a major commercial success. The same year, she starred in wuxia fantasy film The White Haired Witch of Lunar Kingdom. In 2015, Fan joined the China Central Television (CCTV) variety show as a judge in Amazing Chinese and as a contestant in the reality television show Challenger's Alliance. She was ranked fourth on Forbes World's Highest-Paid Actresses list for 2015.

Following the success of The Empress of China, which was co-produced by Talent, the company was listed on the ChiNext board of the Shenzhen Stock Exchange in 2015. Fan's 4-year representation contract with Talent ended in March 2015 without renewal, as part of a planned high-premium acquisition. She established a production company with a registered capital of CN¥3 million, packaging her ten-year personal contract rights into the entity. Talent planned to acquire 51% of Fan's company for approximately CN¥435 million in cash. However, after Chinese regulators tightened oversight of entertainment-industry mergers and acquisitions in 2016, Talent abandoned the purchase and instead co-founded a joint venture with Fan, with a total investment of CN¥30 million from both, to jointly manage her ten-year representation business.

In 2016, Fan, along with her then partner Li Chen, was invited as the final guest on the popular Taiwanese talk show Kangsi Coming before its closure. She was featured in the action comedy Skiptrace alongside Jackie Chan and Johnny Knoxville, which won her Best Supporting Actress at the 1st Golden Screen Awards. Fan then starred in Guo Jingming's L.O.R.D: Legend of Ravaging Dynasties. The all-star film, which was released on 30 September, is China's first computer-animated motion film, but performed poorly at the box office. Fan won the Silver Shell for Best Actress at the 64th San Sebastián International Film Festival and the Golden Rooster Award for Best Actress for her performance in I Am Not Madame Bovary, directed by Feng Xiaogang.

Fan was honored at the 2017 Time 100 Gala in Manhattan, recognized on Time magazine's list of the 100 most influential people. In April 2017, Fan was announced to serve as a jury member at the 2017 Cannes Film Festival. The same year, she starred in Sky Hunter, an aerial warfare film directed by her partner Li Chen. She also starred in the French film The Lady in the Portrait opposite Melvil Poupaud. In June 2017, Fan was invited to join the Academy of Motion Picture Arts and Sciences.

=== 2018–2021: Tax case and hiatus ===
On May 10, 2018, Feng Xiaogang posted on Weibo a concept poster for Cell Phone 2, a sequel to Fan's breakout film Cell Phone (2003). On May 27, former CCTV host Cui Yongyuan, who had a feud with the original film due to its alleged insinuations about his real life, posted on Weibo photos of Fan's contract for The Bombing (2018), where Cui had been credited as the producer before being replaced by his business partner Shi Jianixang, showing that Fan was paid CN¥10 million. On May 28, Cui further alleged that another actor had signed two contracts for a four-day film shoot—one for CN¥10 million and the other for CN¥50 million—pocketing a total of CN¥60 million. Due to the smaller contract's amount matching Fan's revealed contract from the previous day, many incorrectly believed Cui referred to the same person with two days' revelations and was thus accusing Fan of tax evasion through the dual contracts. On May 29, Fan's studio denied the accusation of tax evasion. On June 3, amid public outcry triggered by Cui's posts, China's tax authorities announced the launch of an investigation into Fan's suspected tax evasion. Cui offered his help to the investigation, but clarified that the CN¥60 million contract did not involve Fan, nor did he know whether she had evaded taxes. Instead, the yin-yang contracts he exposed involve a group of people, including Shi Jianxiang and Yang Zi, both behind The Bombing. Cui also apologized to Fan for subjecting her to the investigation, stating that his targets were Feng Xiaogang and Liu Zhenyun, the director and the writer of Cell Phone.

Questions, concerns, and rumors about Fan's whereabouts grew when she was not seen after a last public appearance on 1 July 2018, and a lack of activity on social media after 23 July. According to a later deleted Weibo post by Qiu Ziming, a former journalist for The Economic Observer, Fan was arrested while consulting a fortune-teller Shen Aixu, known by the epithet "Little Immortal," at Deji Plaza in Nanjing. The session, arranged by Deji founder and real estate tycoon Wu Tiejun, with Fan paying Shen CN¥2 million, was raided by the police, who detained Fan, Shen, and Wu on the spot. To maintain secrecy, they covered Fan's head, escorted her from the elevator to the parking garage, and transported her to Beijing by police car. When Fan requested to use the restroom during the transfer, officers cleared the area to prevent exposure. In 2021, the WeChat official account "Defenders," a society of defense lawyers, disclosed that Shen, the "Little Immortal" arrested alongside Fan, had been sentenced to 12 years in prison.

On June 9, Ma Yuan, an actor and nephew of Xi Jinping, wrote on Weibo, "Everyone, stop making wild guesses… He is not alone…," expressing support for Cui Yongyuan's exposé of the entertainment industry. Ma continued to voice support for Cui on social media and, on June 26, reposted a celebratory article titled "Cui Wins Big! Thousands of Chinese Film Companies Face Bankruptcy!"

In the first week of July 2018, Fan canceled a scheduled meeting with a production company, informing them that she had been placed under house arrest. In August, her international agent, Jersey Chong, denied reports that Fan had been arrested. According to the book Red Carpet: Hollywood, China, and the Global Battle for Cultural Supremacy by Erich Schwartzel, for months, Fan was secretly detained under "residential surveillance" at a vacation resort, a form of extrajudicial detention typically used against senior party members. "She was allowed no phone, pen, or paper. She was watched constantly, even while taking showers." Taiwanese television commentator Hsu Sheng-mei claimed, citing a friend of Fan's manager Mu Xiaoguang, that Fan, Mu, their accountant, administrative assistant, and the company's legal representative had all disappeared simultaneously from five different locations in July before being transferred to Beijing "to assist in the investigation." The Taiwanese triad Four Seas Gang, which had established a presence in mainland China following Taiwan's crackdown in the late 1990s, made efforts to rescue Mu, who had connections with the gang.

During Fan's disappearance, her fiancé Li Chen and brother Fan Chengcheng continued working. However, when Li made his first appearance on August 28, in a video recorded for Zhejiang Television's tenth-anniversary celebration, he did not wear his engagement ring. In September, Montblanc, Chopard, Swisse, and Thailand's King Power terminated their endorsement contracts with Fan, while other brands erased her image. On September 6, Securities Daily reposted an article from a WeChat self-media account, claiming that Fan "had been placed under control" and that the "yin-yang contracts" were "only the tip of the iceberg," alleging further involvement in "bank loan irregularities and corruption cases." The original post was later deleted by WeChat for "violating the Cybersecurity Law" following user complaints, though the article remained accessible on Securities Daily's official website.

On the evening of September 15, Fan's Weibo account briefly appeared online before going offline again within ten minutes. On September 16, her birthday, the account automatically generated a birthday post, which was immediately deleted. On September 16, Hu Xijin, editor-in-chief of Global Times, wrote on Weibo that Fan's studio and the authorities should disclose her whereabouts and the progress of the investigation to the public, emphasizing that "transparency is a necessary principle of a law-based society." He also stated that regardless of Cui's motives, his whistleblowing was "an act of courage." On September 17, Apple Daily reported that Fan had returned home after questioning and was barred from posting or contacting the outside world pending the results of the official investigation. On September 22, Securities Daily reported that the Jiangsu tax authorities were still investigating cases in the film and television industry, with final results to be announced later, though no individuals were named.

On October 3, Xinhua News Agency announced that Fan was ordered to pay about CN¥883 million in taxes and penalties for her tax evasion, while her long-time manager, Mu Xiaoguang, had been "subjected to compulsory measures by public security authorities" for destroying accounting records and obstructing the investigation. On the same day, Fan broke her months-long silence with an apology statement on social media. Meanwhile, Taiwan's Mainland Affairs Council protested that the Chinese government had not informed the Taiwanese government of the arrest of Mu, a Taiwanese citizen, as required under the Cross-Strait Joint Crime-Fighting and Judicial Mutual Assistance Agreement. Mu remained out of public view until March 2023, when he attended the funeral of his uncle, veteran actor Yun-Peng Shang, in Taipei. Several sources claimed that Mu had served four years in prison to protect Fan by taking the blame, but the Chinese authorities have never disclosed whether he was sentenced following his arrest.

Among other individuals connected to Fan's case, Cui Yongyuan alleged that during the investigation he was targeted by Shanghai police for tax evasion, whom he accused of having been bribed by Kuailu Group founded by Shi Jianxiang. In 2019, Cui was blacklisted in China after publicly accusing the Supreme People's Court of corruption, a claim denied by the authorities. Shi Jianxiang, producer of The Bombing and Cui's former business partner, left China for the US in March 2016 following an investigation by the China Film Administration into box office fraud involving Ip Man 3, which had been packaged by Shi's Kuailu Group as a financial investment product raising more than RMB 10 billion. In April 2024, Shi Peng, then director of the Jiangsu Taxation Bureau and the official who had overseen Fan's case, was placed under investigation for disciplinary and legal violations.

Fan's case triggered a sweeping tax-audit campaign and regulatory reforms across China's entertainment industry, leading to a prolonged downturn. In December 2018, a group of cultural and film industry representatives anonymously issued an open letter to Premier Li Keqiang, questioning the retroactive and punitive taxation methods of the State Taxation Administration. According to Xinhua News Agency, from October 2018 to the end of the year, taxpayers in the entertainment industry "conducted self-inspections," and CN¥11.747 billion in taxes were declared.

Since the tax case, Fan has been effectively blacklisted in mainland China. On October 17, 2018, The Bombing canceled its release in China. On October 26, the film was released as scheduled in North America, with Fan's scenes reduced to nine seconds. L.O.R.D.: Legend of Ravaging Dynasties 2 was canceled ten days before its originally slated premiere on July 6, 2018. A remade version of the film was released on Tencent Video on December 4, 2020. Fan was removed from the posters and credits, her character's face replaced with CGI and most of her scenes deleted, leaving only her voice.

Besides Cell Phone 2, which wrapped filming in July 2018, Fan's notable unreleased projects include the crime film, The Perfect Blue, and the historical drama, The Legend of Ba Qing (also known as Win the World). The Perfect Blue, directed by Cao Baoping, was reportedly reshot with Ni Ni in 2024. The Legend of Ba Qing, then the largest single investment in an Asian television series with a budget of CN¥500 million, nearly bankrupted its producer, Talent Television & Film, following Gao Yunxiang's sex scandal and Fan's tax case. Fan ceased to be a shareholder of Talent in 2019, cashing out at least CN¥36 million and ending 13 years of close collaboration. Talent spent over CN¥60 million using AI to alter the faces of the show's two leads and announced in 2020 that the series had been delivered to Alibaba Group's Tmall Technology, which paid CN¥450–480 million for the show's permanent exclusive distribution rights, with the AI-altered version reportedly featuring Li Chen and Wang Likun. However, in October 2025, Angela Pan said that the series remained banned.

Fan made attempts at a comeback in China with limited success, with her publicity usually censored or shadowbanned on the Chinese internet. From November 2018 to February 2019, Louis Vuitton held the exhibition Volez, Voguez, Voyagez in Shanghai. A gown previously worn by Fan, who had collaborated with the luxury brand since 2012, was displayed as part of the exhibition, and her image appeared on a large screen at the venue. On April 22, 2019, Fan attended the iQIYI Ninth Anniversary Gala in Beijing, with photos posted on her Instagram the next day. This was her first public event after the tax case; however, by the time she arrived, the media session had already ended. Her closed-door session included only industry VIPs, with no journalists present. In May 2019, Chen Lizhi, founder of MaxTimes and Fan's co-founder in the Heart Ali charity project for children with congenital heart disease in Tibet in 2010, revealed on WeChat Moments that Fan had traveled to Tibet for a charity event but fell ill due to altitude sickness. Shortly afterward, China.org.cn, the web portal of China Internet Information Center, published an article cautioning Fan against using charity as a means to "whitewash" her image or "salvage" her career. Fan was in attendance at the Shanghai Beauty Summit on 12 July and the 12th China Cosmetic Summit on 22 July. In September, Louis Vuitton released a set of promotional images on social media featuring several ambassadors, including Fan. The Weibo post received negative comments and was deleted within three hours, although the same content remained accessible on Instagram and Twitter.

Since June 2019, Fan appeared on the covers of international magazines, including Grazia Korea, Marie Claire Malaysia, L'Officiel Russia, and Harper's Bazaar Vietnam. In June 2020, Fan appeared on the cover of Lifestyle, her first Chinese magazine cover since the tax case. In August 2020, LVMH-owned Guerlain announced her as its global brand ambassador. On September 27, Fan posted photos on Weibo from a promotional event for the Hongqi E-HS9, but her name was absent from the list of celebrity guests in the car company's publicity; she later deleted the post. In October, Fan walked the red carpet at the 27th Huading Awards, where she had initially been scheduled to present an award but was omitted from the final ceremony lineup. On November 13, China's National Radio and Television Administration issued a notice prohibiting "law- and ethics-violating artists" from appearing or speaking publicly. On November 17, Fan appeared at the Ellemen Film Hero Awards to present an award for the animated film Legend of Deification, but she was excluded from the live broadcast on Youku.

In the two years following her tax case until the end of 2020, as part of her efforts to pay the penalty, Fan filed over 200 infringement lawsuits in China, the majority of which she won. Some defendants, after losing their cases, appealed for a second trial, claiming that as a scandal-hit public figure, her image no longer held commercial value. However, these appeals were also unsuccessful.

In April 2021, following Chinese actress Zheng Shuang's tax case, a Weibo user posted in defense of Fan: "I hope the authorities will release the full list of those who contributed to the CN¥11.7 billion in back taxes after Fan Bingbing's case. Don't single someone out and crush them completely—publish the entire list and rectify the issue systemically. Stop using the salary cap policy as a smokescreen to fool the audience. I believe exorbitant pay is a systemic issue, and solving it would be truly commendable." Fan liked the post in Weibo but later unliked it and posted: "This world has never been fair. When you feel something is unfair, you need to accept it as normal. When you feel something is fair, you should consider yourself lucky."

Unlike many other Chinese celebrities who were convicted of tax evasion after her trend-setting case, Fan was allowed to maintain a social media presence, which she parlayed into a successful career running her personal brand, Fan Beauty. Founded not long before her tax case, Fan Beauty's GMV surpassed CN¥300 million in 2021, CN¥800 million in 2022, and CN¥1.1 billion in 2023.

=== 2022–present: Overseas ventures ===
"A living flower can bloom in ten thousand ways."

— Fan in 2025

In January 2022, two Hollywood films starring Fan, The 355 and The King's Daughter, were released. Her participation in The 355 had been announced at the 2018 Cannes Film Festival shortly before her tax investigation. Production was subsequently delayed and did not resume until the summer of 2019, when scenes involving her character were filmed in Paris using a body double, Chinese actress Lu Ning. Fan was eventually permitted to leave China to complete filming in Los Angeles, shot against a green screen and integrated through post-production. The film, her first project following her reemergence, saw its Douban page removed prior to its premiere. The King's Daughter, which had completed filming in 2014, was released shortly after The 355. Fan's performances in both films received negative notices and earned her a nomination for the Golden Raspberry Award for Worst Supporting Actress. In the same year, Fan had a cameo role in the South Korean TV series Insider (2022) and received the ACA Excellence Award at the Busan Film Festival's Asian Content Awards.

In 2023, she starred in the Hong Kong-produced, South Korea-set independent film Green Night (2023), directed by Chinese director Han Shuai. The film, which contains queer themes that would be banned in China, premiered in the Panorama section of the 73rd Berlin International Film Festival, marking her return to the film industry after five years. In September 2023, she served as a jury member at the 71st San Sebastián International Film Festival. In October 2023, she received the Cinema Icon Award at the 34th Singapore International Film Festival. In November and December 2024, two of Fan‘s earlier films, Bodyguards and Assassins (2009) and Sacrifice (2010), were screened in two themed retrospective exhibitions across China, marking the first time her works were shown in the country since her tax case.

In February 2025, Fan joined the competition jury at the 75th Berlin International Film Festival, presided over by Todd Haynes. That same year, she played a Sherpa in the American action-thriller Ice Road: Vengeance, opposite Liam Neeson. She also played a widowed farmer and spiritual healer in the Malaysian independent film Mother Bhumi, directed by Chong Keat Aun. The film was selected for the main competition section of the 38th Tokyo International Film Festival, and earned her Best Leading Actress at the 62nd Golden Horse Awards. The win made her the first major mainland Chinese actor to compete for and receive the award since it was boycotted by the Beijing government following a pro-Taiwan independence speech by a Taiwanese winner at the ceremony in 2018. Despite having expressed a strong desire to attend the ceremony in Taipei, Fan did not appear and instead delivered her acceptance speech by phone through the director on stage. News of her win was heavily censored on Weibo and other Chinese social media platforms, with posts by both her studio and herself deleted. From 25 to 29 December 2025, Mother Bhumi was screened in Hong Kong in five theatrical showings to meet the eligibility requirements for the 44th Hong Kong Film Awards. On 15 January 2026, when the list of eligible films was released, Mother Bhumi, along with three other films, was absent and therefore ruled ineligible, with no explanation given. In March 2026, Mother Bhumi was selected for the main competition of the 28th Far East Film Festival in Udine, Italy, with Fan receiving the Golden Mulberry Award for Outstanding Achievement. In July 2026, Fan received the Global Icon Award at the 30th Bucheon International Fantastic Film Festival.

== Media image ==
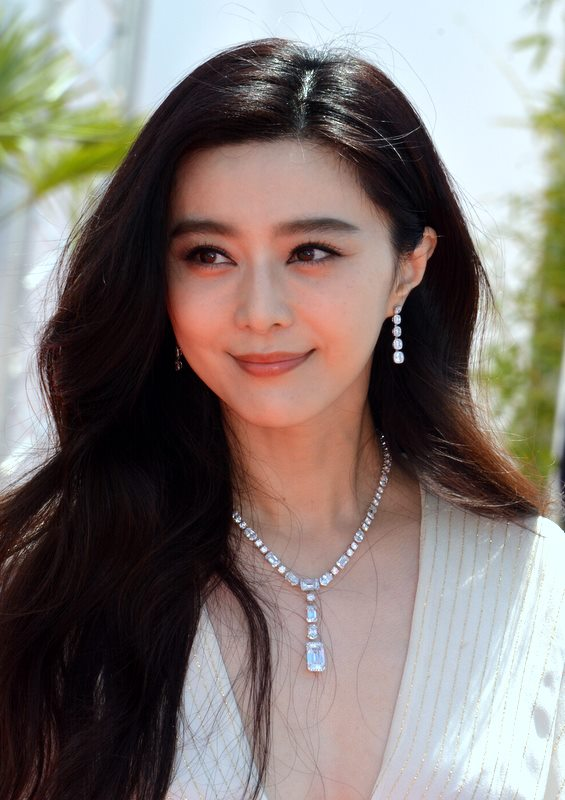
Fan at the 2017 Cannes Film Festival

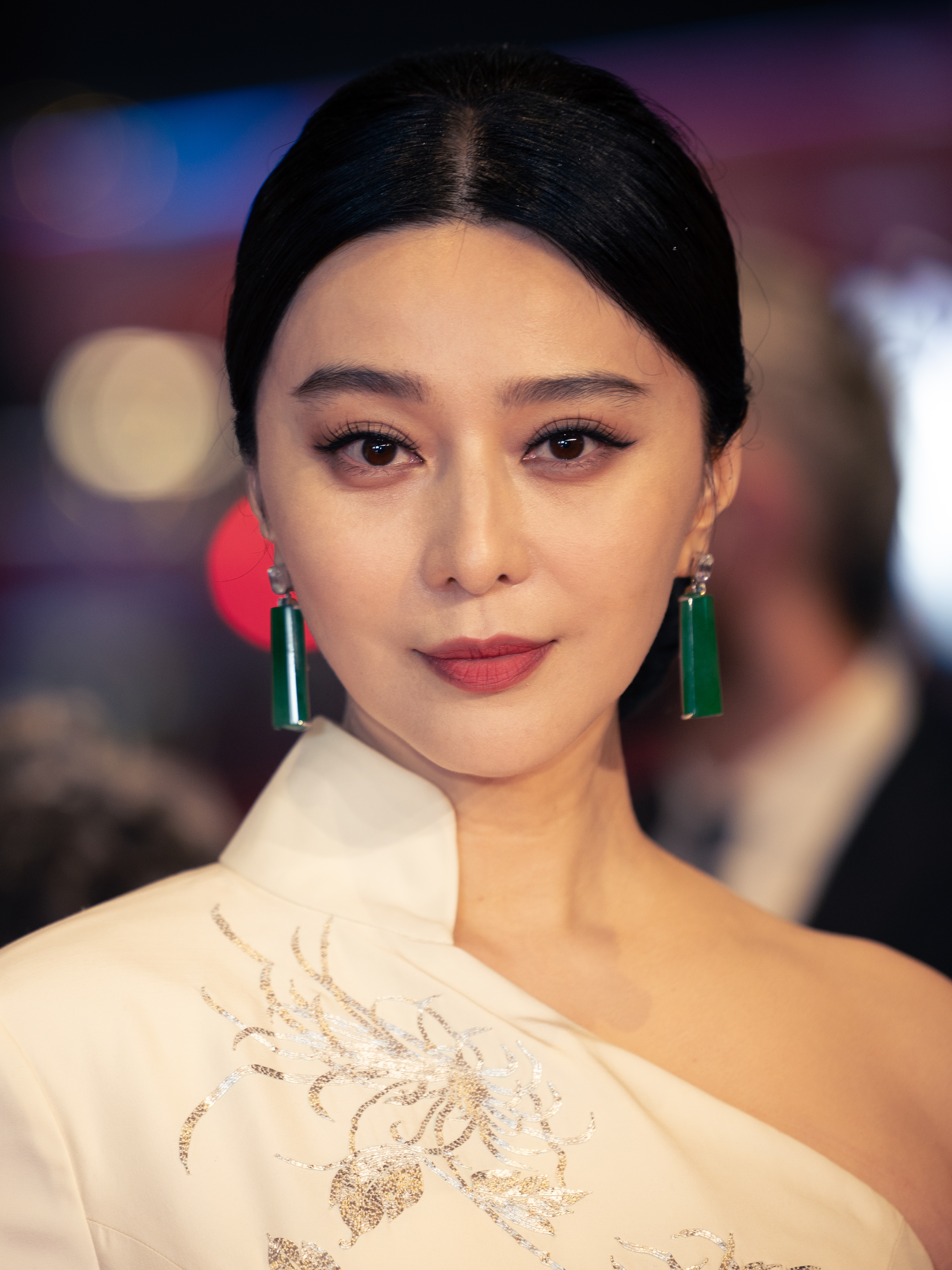
Fan at the Berlinale 2025

Fan has been on the covers of Grazia (Korea, Middle East, Singapore, Malaysia, International), L'Officiel (Italy, India, Liechtenstein, Russia, Singapore), Vogue (Czechoslovakia, Singapore), Wonderland (China, UK), Marie Claire (Malaysia), Harper's Bazaar (Serbia), T (Singapore), Numéro (Netherlands), Schön! and more.

On 13 May 2010, Fan wore a "dragon robe" on the red carpet of the 63rd Cannes Film Festival. The dress, co-designed by Chinese designer Laurence Hsu and Fan herself, features two leaping dragons and crashing waves on the hem, in the bright yellow color that was exclusively used by emperors in ancient China. The dress was collected by the Victoria & Albert Museum in London on 12 March 2012. Laurence Hsu announced that the dress shown at the museum is a modified version of the original, which was bought by Madame Tussauds. On 11 May 2011, Fan wore a crane dress on the red carpet at the opening ceremony of the 64th Cannes Film Festival. On the red carpet of the opening ceremony of the 65th Cannes Film Festival, Fan wore an elegant pale strapless gown designed by her friend Christopher Bu, decorated with bright floral designs and stories about the Four Beauties of ancient China. Inspired by a porcelain vase, the ancient vibe of her dress was complemented by her hairstyle, which made her look like a young maiden in the Tang dynasty.

Fan received various invitations from fashion brands such as Valentino, Giorgio Armani S.p.A., Salvatore Ferragamo S.p.A., Atelier Versace, Christian Dior and Louis Vuitton, to attend fashion shows in Paris, Beijing and Shanghai. On 3 July 2012, she closed the Stéphane Rolland's Haute Couture show in Paris, and was featured in the fashion show's finale. On July 31, 2012, she was ranked number nine on Vanity Fair's International Best Dressed list 2012. On 19 September, she was honoured with the Personal Style Award by Elle (USA Edition). On December 2, 2012, she became the Asian ambassador of Louis Vuitton "Epi Alma" series of handbags. On 5 December, she was awarded "The Most Beautiful Woman of the Year" by the magazine Esquire (China Edition).

In 2013, Fan became the first Asian celebrity ambassador for the Champagne House Moët & Chandon, and also the brand ambassador for Chopard. On May 18, 2013, she was honoured as the International Artist of the Year in Cannes by The Hollywood Reporter. Fan joined the opening ceremony of 2013 Cannes Film Festival premiere, wearing a custom Louis Vuitton gown, and that was the first time the French fashion house had created a gown especially for an Asian actress.

In April 2013, Fan became the Greater Chinese face of Louis Vuitton's "Chic on the bridge" advertising campaign, promoting the classic "Alma" handbag launched in 1934, shot by American fashion photographer Steven Klein. In December 2013, Fan starred as the global face of the Louis Vuitton's Spring/Summer 2014 collection, which marked Marc Jacobs's final advertising campaign for the brand, featuring alongside Catherine Deneuve, Sofia Coppola, Gisele Bündchen, Caroline de Maigret and Edie Campbell. Fan was ranked on Vanity Fair's International Best Dressed list 2015 and 2016. Fan was named global ambassador of several brands such as ReFa Beauty Care Tools, De Beers, King Power, and Montblanc. In August 2020, French luxury beauty house Guerlain announced that Fan as the brand's global spokesperson.

On July 3, 2023, Fan closed the Georges Hobeika's Haute Couture Autumn/Winter 2023 show at Paris Haute Couture Week. On October 2, 2023, Fan closed the closed out the catwalk for the Mugler's Spring/Summer 2024 womenswear show. In April 2024, Fan was invited as a special guest at the Songkran Festival in Thailand. On 27 May 2024, it was announced that Fan was appointed as Malacca's tourism ambassador, she toured the Malaysian state from 14 June till 16 June.

== Personal life ==
=== Relationships ===
In 2001, Fan dated actor Han Qing after co-starring in the 2001 TV drama Luan Shi Piao Ping.

From 2004 to 2007, Fan dated actor Wang Xuebing after co-starring in the 2004 TV drama Jian Lin Tian Xia. Fan took a nine-month hiatus from acting to spend time with him.

In 2013, romantic rumors surfaced about Fan and Aarif Rahman after they filmed One Night Surprise. In August 2014, while working together again on The Empress of China, the TV series produced by Fan, the two were photographed sharing the same hotel room at night. Fan suggested that they broke up around the end of 2014, while Rahman acknowledged that Fan and he had been in a relationship.

On 29 May 2015, it was announced on Li Chen's social media that he and Fan were dating. On 16 September 2017, they were engaged after he proposed to her at her birthday party. They announced their separation on 27 June 2019. In October 2019, Zhuo Wei claimed that Fan and Li had been secretly married, indicating that their announced separation was in fact a divorce. Fan explained in a 2020 magazine interview that she had left Li to protect him from the fallout of her tax case, which had affected both Li's career and her brother Fan Chengcheng's.

Following Fan's split with Li, a Douban user claimed that Fan was in a relationship with Wu Tiejun, chairman of the Deji Group, and that she was cohabiting with him, pregnant, and planning to marry. The user posted a CCTV footage dated June 19, 2019, showing a woman apparently Fan at Deji World Trade Center, where she allegedly lived. Wu had previously been taken away by police with Fan in 2018, when she was consulting a fortune teller at Deji Plaza arranged by him. Fan's studio issued a statement rejecting as false the claims that she was cohabiting with Wu, pregnant, or financially supported by him, without addressing her relationship with Wu. According to a Weibo post by Qiu Ziming, a former reporter for the Economic Observer, citing an associate of Wu, "they denied the 'rumor' that the two had been cohabiting for about half a month, acknowledging only that Fan had indeed asked the tycoon for some help."

In 2022, Fan began a relationship with Guo Yanfeng, a former PLA officer who served as vice chairman of Gaosheng Wealth Group, a Zhongzhi-affiliated firm, before becoming a business partner in her brand Fan Beauty. The two parted ways at the end of 2023.

=== Residence ===
In 2024, Fan moved to Hong Kong after acquiring residency through an investment immigration program.

== Discography ==
=== Studio albums ===
| Year | Album | Details | Ref. |
|---|---|---|---|
| 2005 | Just Begun | Format: CD, digital download; Label: Warner Music Beijing | |

=== Singles ===
| Year | Title | Album | Ref. |
|---|---|---|---|
| 2000 | "Floating in Chaos" (乱世浮萍) | Non-album singles | |
| 2002 | "Happiness for Thousand Years" (幸福千万年) | Non-album singles | |
| 2004 | "Flowers Blossom, At Ease" (花开自在) | Non-album singles | |
| 2007 | "Beyond Love" (爱超越) | Non-album singles | |
| 2007 | "Chasing Love" (追爱) | Non-album singles | |
| 2007 | "Rouge" (胭脂) | Non-album singles | |
| 2007 | "Rouge Snow" (胭脂雪) | Non-album singles | |
| 2008 | "Dare to Fly" (勇敢飞) | Non-album singles | |
| 2009 | "Love Ends, People Part Ways" (爱终人散) | Non-album singles | |
| 2009 | "I Thought" (我以为) | Non-album singles | |
| 2011 | "Farewell" (辞) | Non-album singles | |
| 2013 | "One Night Surprise" (一夜惊喜) | Non-album singles | |

== Accolades ==
=== Awards and nominations ===
| Award | Year | Category | Work | Result | Ref. |
|---|---|---|---|---|---|
| Asia Contents Awards | 2022 | ACA Excellence Award | —N/a | Won | |
| Asia Model Awards | 2022 | Asia Star Award | —N/a | Won | |
| Asian Film Awards | 2017 | Best Actress | I Am Not Madame Bovary | Won | |
| Bangkok International Film Festival | 2026 | Best Performance in a Leading Role | Mother Bhumi | Won | |
| Beijing College Student Film Festival | 2011 | Best Actress | Buddha Mountain | Won | |
| Beijing College Student Film Festival | 2013 | Best Actress | Double Xposure | Nominated | |
| Bucheon International Fantastic Film Festival | 2026 | Global Icon Award | —N/a | Honored | |
| China Film Director's Guild Awards | 2012 | Best Actress | Buddha Mountain | Nominated | |
| China Film Director's Guild Awards | 2017 | Best Actress | I Am Not Madame Bovary | Won | |
| China TV Drama Awards | 2015 | Best Actress | The Empress of China | Won | |
| China TV Drama Awards | 2015 | Influential Figure of the Year | —N/a | Won | |
| Chinese Film Media Awards | 2004 | Best Supporting Actress | Cell Phone | Nominated | |
| Chinese Film Media Awards | 2012 | Best Actress | Double Xposure | Nominated | |
| Eurasia International Film Festival | 2007 | Best Actress | Lost in Beijing | Won | |
| Far East Film Festival | 2026 | Golden Mulberry Award for Outstanding Achievement | —N/a | Honored | |
| Golden Bauhinia Awards | 2007 | Best Actress | A Battle of Wits | Nominated | |
| Golden Horse Awards | 2007 | Best Supporting Actress | The Matrimony | Won | |
| Golden Horse Awards | 2016 | Best Leading Actress | I Am Not Madame Bovary | Nominated | |
| Golden Horse Awards | 2025 | Best Leading Actress | Mother Bhumi | Won | |
| Golden Phoenix Awards | 2009 | Academy Award | Desires of the Heart | Won | |
| Golden Raspberry Awards | 2023 | Worst Supporting Actress | The King's Daughter and The 355 | Nominated | |
| Golden Rooster Awards | 2004 | Best Supporting Actress | Cell Phone | Nominated | |
| Golden Rooster Awards | 2017 | Best Actress | I Am Not Madame Bovary | Won | |
| Golden Screen Awards | 2016 | Best Supporting Actress | Skiptrace | Won | |
| Hong Kong Film Awards | 2010 | Best Supporting Actress | Bodyguards and Assassins | Nominated | |
| Hong Kong Film Critics Society Awards | 2026 | Best Actress | Mother Bhumi | Nominated | |
| Huabiao Awards | 2004 | Outstanding New Actress | Cell Phone | Nominated | |
| Huading Awards | 2012 | Best Actress in a Motion Picture | Double Xposure | Won | |
| Huading Awards | 2015 | Best Actress in a Television Series | The Empress of China | Nominated | |
| Huading Awards | 2015 | Best Producer for a Television Series | The Empress of China | Nominated | |
| Hundred Flowers Awards | 2002 | Best Actress | Fall in Love at First Sight | Nominated | |
| Hundred Flowers Awards | 2004 | Best Actress | Cell Phone | Won | |
| Hundred Flowers Awards | 2010 | Best Actress | Bodyguards and Assassins | Nominated | |
| San Sebastián International Film Festival | 2016 | Silver Shell for Best Actress | I Am Not Madame Bovary | Won | |
| Singapore International Film Festival | 2023 | Cinema Icon Award | —N/a | Honored | |
| Tokyo International Film Festival | 2010 | Best Actress | Buddha Mountain | Won | |
| Weibo Awards | 2011 | Actress of the Year | —N/a | Won | |
| Weibo Awards | 2017 | Weibo Queen | —N/a | Won | |

=== State honors ===
- Malacca:
  - Lieutenant of the Exalted Order of Malacca (DPSM) – Datuk (24 August 2025)
