= Keep Running: Nature Season =

2023 special season of the Chinese television series

- Poster for the Nature Season
- Starring: Li Chen; Zheng Kai; Sha Yi; Bai Lu; Zhou Shen; Fan Chengcheng; Yuqi; Zhang Zhenyuan
- No. of episodes: 7

Release
- Original network: ZRTG: Zhejiang Television
- Original release: November 18 – December 30, 2023

Season chronology
- ← Previous; Season 11 Next → Season 12

This is a list of episodes of the Chinese variety show Keep Running in the special Nature Season (also known as the Ecological Chapter). The show airs on Zhejiang Television. The regular lineup for this special iteration featured the addition of Zhang Zhenyuan from TNT as a brand-new permanent member. Longtime cast member Angelababy did not participate in this season following public controversy regarding her alleged attendance at a cabaret show in Paris, leading to her subsequent removal from the program's promotional material and broadcasting lineup.

== Production and cast changes ==
Prior to the filming of the Nature Season, the production experienced a major lineup shift. Longtime permanent cast member Angelababy, who had been a staple of the series since 2014, was excluded from the season's roster. This followed widespread media coverage and backlash in mainland China regarding her presence at the Crazy Horse cabaret performance in Paris in late 2023.

== Episodes ==
No. overall	No. in season	Broadcast date	Guest(s)	Mission / Theme	Winner(s)
156	1	November 18, 2023	Meng Ziyi, Cai Wenjing	Ecological Knowledge Quiz Competition (Kunming Dianchi Lake)	Zheng Kai, Zhou Shen
157	2	November 25, 2023	Meng Ziyi, Cai Wenjing	Target! Biological Sketch Masters (Kunming Species Diversity / Kunming International Flora Auction Center)	Brown Team (Li Chen, Sha Yi, Cai Wenjing)
158	3	December 2, 2023	Lu Yuxiao, Huang Xinchun, Fan Shiqi	The Ecological Stories Inside Books	Green Team (Zheng Kai, Lu Yuxiao)
159	4	December 9, 2023	Wei Daxun, Tang Jiuzhou, Chen Bing, Deng Enxi, Jiang Long	Traditional Seal Engraving and National Treasures Hunt	Gold Team (Sha Yi, Fan Chengcheng, Jiang Long)
160	5	December 16, 2023	Wei Daxun, Tang Jiuzhou, Chen Bing, Deng Enxi, Jiang Long	Green Low-Carbon Commuting Living Challenge	All Members (Cooperative Victory)
161	6	December 23, 2023	Wei Daxun, Tang Jiuzhou, Chen Bing, Deng Enxi, Jiang Long	Marine Eco-Protection Countermeasures ("The Vanishing Saplings")	Blue Team (Li Chen, Zheng Kai, Zhang Zhenyuan, Jiang Qiwen)
162	7	December 30, 2023	Wei Daxun, Tang Jiuzhou, Chen Bing, Deng Enxi, Jiang Long	Season Grand Finale: Ecological Civilization Summary Review	White Team (Zhou Shen, Zhang Zhenyuan, Chen Zhuoxuan)
