= The Return of the Condor Heroes (1984 TV series) =

1984 Taiwanese TV series

- Cover of a special issue of an unknown magazine featuring the series
- 神鵰俠侶
- Genre: Wuxia
- Based on: The Return of the Condor Heroes by Jin Yong
- Starring: Meng Fei; Angela Pan
- Country of origin: Taiwan
- Original language: Mandarin
- No. of episodes: 17

Production
- Producer: Chou Yu
- Production location: Taiwan
- Running time: ≈120 minutes per episode

Original release
- Network: CTV

The Return of the Condor Heroes (神鵰俠侶) is a Taiwanese wuxia television series adapted from the novel of the same title by Jin Yong. It was first broadcast on CTV in 1984 in Taiwan.

== Cast ==
- Meng Fei as Yang Guo
  - Kuo Hui-wen as Yang Guo (child)
- Angela Pan as Xiaolongnü
- Hsiang Yun-peng / Chang Han-po as Guo Jing
- Shen Hai-jung as Huang Rong
- Lin Ling as Guo Fu
- Ying Hsiao-wei as Guo Xiang
- Chao Tien-li as Li Mochou
- Chiang Ta-chuan / Wang Hsieh as Huang Yaoshi
- Sun Jung-chi / Lü Fu-pao as Hong Qigong
- Li Chih-chien as Ouyang Feng
- Chu Pen-ke as Yideng
- Lung Kuan-wu as Zhou Botong
- Wang Chi-sheng as Jinlun Fawang
- Sung Hsien-hung as Huodu
- Kang Kai as Da'erba
- Lin Hsiu-chun as Cheng Ying
- Pei Hsin-yu as Lu Wushuang
- Fu Chuan / Tang Hui-chen as Gongsun Lü'e
- Chou Lin / Li An-shun as Yelü Qi
- Chao Hsueh-huang as Yin Zhiping
- Tang Fu-hsiung as Zhao Zhijing
- Lin Kuang-chin as Li Zhichang
- Kao Sheng as Lu Qingdu
- Chang Chieh / Kuan Hong as Gongsun Zhi
- Chen Chih-chen as Qiu Qianchi
- Chen Chih-tseng as Granny Sun
- Cheng Ching as Qiu Qianren
- Mao Ching-shun as Qiu Chuji
- Wang Hai-lan as Sun Bu'er
- Li Kui as Wang Chuyi
- Xie Chien-wen as Hao Datong
- Niu Yen-jung as Yelü Yan
- Wang Yu-huan as Wanyan Ping
- Cheng Ya-yun as Hong Lingbo
- He Wei-hsiung / Hsueh Chang-wen as Wu Santong
- Lin Chi-yang as Wu Xiuwen
- Sun Hsiao-wei / Meng Chia-te as Wu Dunru
- Lin Feng-chin as Shagu
- Wang Chang-chih as Yelü Chucai
- Wei I-ping as Ke Zhen'e
- Chang Chia-hui as Yinggu
- Fu Ming as Lu Youjiao
- Hsieh Wen-to as the Sindhu Monk
- Wang Fu-shih as Lu Liding
- Yeh Yun-yen as Xiaoxiangzi
- Chu Chien-tu as Guo Polu
- Hsieh Ping-nan / Chang Tai-lun as Kublai Khan
- Feng Kai as Renchuzi
