= Fighting (2014 film) =

- Directed by: Yu Junhao
- Starring: Lu Yi; Peter Ho; Wei Yi; Zhang Zhikang
- Music by: all ost track
- Release date: March 21, 2014
- Running time: 91 minutes
- Country: China
- Language: Mandarin
- Box office: US$11,670,000

Fighting (Chinese: 英雄之战) is a 2014 Chinese action-romance film directed by Yu Junhao and starring Lu Yi, Peter Ho, Wei Yi and Zhang Zhikang. The film was released on March 21, 2014.

== Cast ==
- Lu Yi
- Peter Ho
- Wei Yi
- Zhang Zhikang
- Hou Yong
- Wu Ma
- Yvonne Yung
- Lam Wai
- Li Shuran
- Zhang Xiaojun
