= Hou Yong (actor) =

Chinese actor

- Born: 23 February 1967 (age 58); Lianyungang, Jiangsu, China
- Occupation: Actor
- Years active: 1994 - present
- Spouse: Shen Rong (1992 - present)

Chinese name
Transcriptions
Standard Mandarin
- Hanyu Pinyin: Hóu Yǒng
Yue: Cantonese
- Jyutping: Hau4 Jung5

Hou Yong (born 23 February 1967) is a Chinese actor from Lianyungang, Jiangsu province. He graduated from the Jiangsu Drama School (江苏省戏剧学校) in 1989.

== Filmography ==
=== Film ===
Year	Title	Role	Notes
2000	The Red Stone Ovoo 红石敖包	Eri Bala	
2001	Charging out Amazon 冲出亚马逊	Wang Hui	
2001	Frequency for Victory 声震长空	Su Zhihao	
2002	Direct Damage 直接伤害	Zhou Zijian	
2006	Drug Cop 缉毒警	Wu Guanglin	
2007	Gong Pu 公仆	Wang Jin	
2007	Good Man 江北好人	Xiao Lin	
2007	The First of August 八月一日	He Long	
2008	Red Cliff 赤壁	Lu Su	
2009	The Founding of a Republic 建国大业	Chen Geng	
2009	Jing Tian Dong Di 惊天动地	Tang Xinsheng	
2010	Just Another Pandora's Box 越光宝盒		cameo
2011	The Founding of a Party 建党伟业	Tang Shaoyi	
2013	The Empire Symbol 帝国秘符		
2014	The Struggle of 80's 80后的独立宣言		
2014	Fighting 英雄之战		
2015	Entrapment		
2019	The Bravest (烈火英雄)	Wu Chenguang	
2019	The Eight Hundred 八佰		
2019	For Love with You		

=== Television ===
Year	Title	Role	Notes
2006	Romance of Red Dust 风尘三侠之红拂女	Li Yuan	
2006	Initiating Prosperity 开创盛世	Wei Zheng	
2009	The Qin Empire 大秦帝国	Duke Xiao of Qin	
2017	Siege in Fog 人生若如初相见	Yi Shoucheng	
