= Keep Running: The Ancient Tea-Horse Road =

2024 special season of the Chinese television series

- Poster for The Ancient Tea-Horse Road
- Starring: Li Chen; Zheng Kai; Sha Yi; Bai Lu; Zhou Shen; Yuqi; Zhang Zhenyuan
- No. of episodes: 8

Release
- Original network: ZRTG: Zhejiang Television
- Original release: November 23, 2024 – January 11, 2025

Season chronology
- ← Previous; Season 12 Next → Season 13

This is a list of episodes of the Chinese variety show Keep Running in the special spin-off season, Keep Running: The Ancient Tea-Horse Road (《奔跑吧·茶马古道篇》). The show airs on Zhejiang Television. The cast travels along the historic Ancient Tea-Horse Road in Yunnan, exploring local communities, natural landscapes, ethnic cultures, traditional tea and horse trade heritage, and participating in signature games and challenges. Fan Chengcheng was unable to participate as he was filming a television show at the time.

== List of episodes ==
(Series) Episode #	(Season) Episode #	Broadcast Date	Guest(s)	Theme / Result
175	Tea/01	November 23, 2024	Evonne Hsieh, Cheng Lei, Shen Xiaoting	Theme: Commencing the Caravan Journey in Pu'er; Result: Rainforest team-building trek completed successfully.
176	Tea/02	November 30, 2024	Evonne Hsieh, Cheng Lei, Shen Xiaoting, Gao Hanyu	Theme: Pu'er Tea Heritage Exploration; Result: Teams secure local trade tokens and pass ancient market challenges.
177	Tea/03	December 7, 2024	Zhang Bichen, Wei Daxun, Tang Jiuzhou, Gao Hanyu, Meng Ziyi, Li Yunrui	Theme: Dali Travel Photography & Aesthetic Battle; Result: Historical dress and cultural landmark checks finalized.
178	Tea/04	December 14, 2024	Zhang Bichen, Wei Daxun, Tang Jiuzhou, Gao Hanyu, Meng Ziyi, Li Yunrui, Zhai Zilu, Yu Yang (comedian)	Theme: Lijiang Self-Driving & Dongba Culture Quest; Result: Factions safely decipher the classical Naxi cultural matrix.
179	Tea/05	December 21, 2024	Meng Ziyi, Li Yunrui, Yu Yang	Theme: Natural Barriers of the Mountain Corridors; Result: High-altitude physical challenge baseline parameters met.
180	Tea/06	December 28, 2024	No guests	Theme: The "Pay-the-Bill Journey" in Shangri-La; Result: Tactical logistics and finance game completed by the returnees.
181	Tea/07	January 4, 2025	No guests	Theme: Unveiling Final Account Ledgers; Result: Factions complete the caravan economic trade strategy.
182	Tea/08	January 11, 2025	No guests	Theme: Shika Snow Mountain Season Finale; Result: Cast members locate the final ancient bells to complete the journey.
