= Desires of the Heart (2008 film) =

2008 Hong Kong film by Ma Liwen

- Film poster
- Traditional Chinese: 桃花運
- Simplified Chinese: 桃花运
- Hanyu Pinyin: Táohuā Yùn
- Directed by: Ma Liwen
- Written by: Ma Liwen
- Produced by: John Chong; Henry Fong; Stephen Lam; Cheung Hong Tat; Song Dai
- Starring: Vivian Wu; Ge You; Fan Bingbing; Cong Shan
- Production company: Sil-Metropole Organisation
- Distributed by: Sil-Metropole Organisation
- Release dates: 20 November 2008 (China); 18 December 2008 (Hong Kong)
- Running time: 107 minutes
- Country: Hong Kong
- Language: Mandarin
- Box office: ¥20 million

Desires of the Heart is a 2008 Hong Kong romantic comedy film directed and written by Ma Liwen, starring Vivian Wu, Ge You, Fan Bingbing, and Cong Shan. The film was first released in China on 20 November 2008, and grossed over ¥20 million.

== Cast ==
- Vivian Wu as Ye Shengying.
- Ge You as the swindler who cheats women.
- Fan Bingbing as a woman with a pair of glasses who was cheated by the swindler.
- Cong Shan as a woman who was cheated by the swindler.

=== Other ===
- Chen Jin as a middle-aged women who was cheated by the swindler.
- Guo Tao as Zhang Su.
- Yuen Qiu as Gao Yajuan.
- Mei Ting as Zhang Ying.
- Geng Le as Zhao Da.
- Song Jia as Lin Cong.
- Li Chen as Guan Xiang.
- Li Xiaolu as Xiao Mei.
- Duan Yihong as Zong Yang.
- Liu Zhenyun as Wei Xiang, Ye Shengying's former husband.
- Baty Chen as Wei Xiang's lover.
- Li Na as Zhang Ying's girlfriend.
- Gao Fei as Zhang Ying's girlfriend.

== Box office ==
It grossed ¥2 million on its first day, and it grossed ¥20 million on its opening weekend.
