= Angela Pan =

Hong Kong actress

- Born: Pan Yin-tze; 5 June 1949 (age 77); Suzhou, Republic of China
- Occupation: Actress
- Years active: 1963–present
- Spouse: Chan Hung-lit (m. 1972; div. 1980)

Chinese name
- Traditional Chinese: 潘迎紫
- Simplified Chinese: 潘迎紫
Transcriptions
Standard Mandarin
- Hanyu Pinyin: Pān Yíngzǐ

Angela Pan Yin-tze (born 5 June 1949), or Violet Pan Ying Zi, is a Hong Kong actress who starred in numerous films and soap operas in the 1970s–1980s.

== Life and career ==
Pan started her career in Hong Kong in films and stage shows. She became a celebrity after traveling to Taiwan and becoming the lead actress in The Return of the Condor Heroes (神鵰俠侶), The Empress of the Dynasty (一代女皇), and The Princess of the Dynasty (一代公主). The Taiwan Television Circle described Pan and her costar Meng Fei (孟飛) as the "perfect couple on the screen." The shows were viewed by over 60% of the population.

Pan concluded her work with the Southern Experimental Theater Troupe and began working as an actress in shows through Taiwan's well-known television network China Television Company, Ltd., also known as CTV (中國電視公司). At the time, there were only three channels in Taiwan: Taiwan Television (TTV), China Television (CTV), and Chinese Television System (CTS). This led her to be dubbed the "Lovely Young Mistress of CTV (中視當家花旦)" and the "Queen of CTV" due to all of her television appearances being on CTV during the golden age of the 1980s and 90s.

Her ability to portray characters from childhood to old age in critically acclaimed series such as "The Empress of the Dynasty" and "Empress Da Yu Er" (一代皇后大玉兒) has made it difficult for the public to determine her age. Pan's versatility in playing teenage girl roles throughout her career has earned her the nicknames "Baby Doll," "Doll," and "Ageless Legend." She is also notable for being the first actress in the Chinese entertainment industry rumored to have undergone cosmetic surgery, and her seemingly ageless appearance has drawn comparisons to American actress Goldie Hawn.

Pan is also well known for The Empress of the Dynasty, The Return of the Condor Heroes, Empress Da Yu Er (一代皇后大玉兒) and The Quarrels with Mother-in-Law (婆媳過招七十回), among other roles.

== Personal life ==
In 1972, Pan married actor Chan Hung-lit, with whom she co-starred with in many films. The couple divorced in 1980.

== Filmography ==
=== Film ===
Year	Title	Role
1963	Butterfly Lovers 梁山伯與祝英台	
1963	A Maid from Heaven 七仙女	
1966	Come Drink with Me / Big Drunk Hero 大醉俠	
1966	Heroic Three / The Magnificent Trio 邊城三俠	
1966	Princess Iron Fan 鐵扇公主	
1967	The One-Armed Swordsman 獨臂刀	
1967	Moon Night Cutter 月夜斬	
1967	Dragon Form Eight Swords 龍形八劍	
1967	Stock Market, Stock Market 股票股票	
1968	When the Clouds Roll By 雲泥	
1969	Runway Model / Torrent of Desire 欲焰狂流	
1970	Swordswomen Three 江湖三女俠	
1971	Intruder at White Lotus Temple 大破白蓮教	
1971	The Jade Faced Assassin 玉面俠	Xie Xinchan
1975	Kissed by the Wolves 狼吻	
1983	New: The Burning of the Red Lotus Temple 新火燒紅蓮寺	
1983	Police Angel 小姐當差	
1985	Miss Mary Lee / Run Tiger Run 兩隻老虎	

=== Television ===
Year	Title	Role
1983	One plus One does not equal Two 一加一不等於二	Ten Ten-Ten
1984	Autumn Water Lovers 秋水伊人	
1984	The Return of the Condor Heroes 神鵰俠侶	Xiaolongnü
1985	The Bride with White Hair 神州俠侶	Hsiao Yu-hsueh
1985	The Empress of the Dynasty 一代女皇	Wu Zetian
1986	Princess of Dynasty 一代公主	Wu Zetian and Princess Taiping
1986	Happy Home, All is well 家和萬事興	Ah-shui
1987	Song Queen of the Age 一代歌后	Zhou Xuan
1987	The Sacred Arrow of Spirit Mountain 靈山神箭	Pai Yu-hsuang
1988	Mama, Jili and Shao Ding-dong 媽媽吉利小叮噹	Hua Wa-wa
1988	Diao Chan 貂蟬	Diaochan
1990	Flame Bathing Phoenix 浴火鳳凰	Consort Mei
1991	The Quarrels with Mother-in-Law 婆媳過招七十回	Chen Fen-lan
1992	Empress Da Yu Er 一代皇后大玉兒	Empress Xiaozhuangwen
1993	Super Lady Patrol 超級女巡按	Fang Mei-chun (方美君)
1998	虯髯客與紅拂女	Hong Fu Nü
2001	寶斗里長	Shen Hsiu-feng
	幾時再回頭	
	菟絲花	
2018	Win the World	Queen Dowager Huayang
2020	Ode to Daughter of Great Tang 大唐女儿行	Consort Wan
