= The Matrimony =

- Theatrical release poster
- Traditional Chinese: 心中有鬼
- Simplified Chinese: 心中有鬼
- Hanyu Pinyin: xīn zhōng yoǔ guǐ
- Directed by: Teng Huatao
- Screenplay by: Yang Qianling; Chang Chia-lu
- Produced by: Chen Kuo-fu; James Wang; Du Jiayi
- Starring: Leon Lai; Fan Bingbing; Rene Liu
- Cinematography: Mark Lee
- Edited by: Angie Lam
- Music by: Cincin Lee
- Production companies: Huayi Brothers; Nanfang Films
- Distributed by: Huayi Brothers
- Release date: February 28, 2007
- Running time: 90 minutes
- Country: China
- Language: Mandarin
- Box office: $1,501,707

The Matrimony (Chinese: 心中有鬼; lit. 'Ghost in Heart') is a 2007 Chinese horror film directed by Teng Huatao and starring Leon Lai, Fan Bingbing, and Rene Liu. The movie was released on February 28, 2007.

== Plot ==
Set during the 1930s, The Matrimony follows Shen Junchu (Leon Lai), a cinematographer that's deeply in love with his girlfriend Xu Manli (Fan Bingbing). Due to his extremely introverted character, Junchu was unable to confess to her how deeply he cared for her. When Manli dies in a freak car accident on the way to their date, Junchu mourns her deeply. Junchu's mother manages to convince him to marry Sansan (Rene Liu), but he is unwilling to allow her to take Manli's place in his heart. When Sansan discovers a mysterious attic room, she's forbidden to enter by Junchu. She eventually enters the room, only to find the ghost of Manli. Manli offers to help Sansan's unhappy relationship with Junchu, only for the ghost to grow dangerously jealous when Junchu begins to show an attraction for Sansan.

== Cast ==
- Leon Lai as Shen Junchu
- Fan Bingbing as Xu Manli
- Rene Liu as Sansan

== Awards ==
- 44th Golden Horse Film Awards
  - Best Supporting Actress - Fan Bingbing
  - Best Cinematography - Li Pingbin

== Reception ==
Blogcritics criticized some parts of the film, such as some "obvious holes" and plot lulls, but stated that the film was interesting and beautifully shot. Variety praised the film, noting some similarities between the plot of Rebecca and The Matrimony. Dread Central gave the film three blades, writing that it "still manages to fall into the same quasi-supernatural trappings in its final act (including the aforementioned frustrating ending), but it sure is a touching date movie if nothing else." HorrorNews.net called The Matrimony "a fine example of a classic ghost story". A reviewer for the Tribeca Film Festival praised the film, citing the set designs and special effects as highlights. DVD Talk wrote that while the film was a "luxuriant, affective supernatural chiller", some of the twists in the film made it "less satisfying as a vision of subtle horror".
