= The Empress of the Dynasty =

- Also known as: Yi Dai Nü Huang; Yi Dai Nü Huang Wu Zetian
- Chinese: 一代女皇 / 一代女皇武則天
- Hanyu Pinyin: Yī Dài Nǚ Huáng / Yī Dài Nǚ Huáng Wǔ Zétiān
- Genre: Historical drama
- Screenplay by: Meng Tzu-yi; Tu-ku Hung; Lo Wen-chung
- Directed by: Li Yueh-fung
- Starring: Angela Pan
- Theme music composer: Chang Yung-chiang
- Opening theme: Yi Dai Nü Huang (一代女皇) performed by Jin Pei-shan
- Country of origin: Taiwan
- Original language: Mandarin
- No. of episodes: 40

Production
- Executive producers: Li Jin-cheng; Peng Chao-min
- Producer: Lin Hui-chun
- Production location: Taiwan
- Running time: 60 minutes per episode (including commercials)
- Production company: CTV

Original release
- Network: CTV
- Release: 18 November 1985 – 10 January 1986

The Empress of the Dynasty is a Taiwanese television series based on the life of Wu Zetian, the only female emperor in Chinese history. Directed by Li Yueh-fung and produced by Lin Hui-chun, the series starred Angela Pan as Wu Zetian. It was first broadcast in Taiwan on CTV from 18 November 1985 to 10 January 1986.

== Plot ==
Wu Shiyue was surprised when his wife Lady Yang gave birth to a daughter. His daughter was foretold to be important in the future. His daughter, Wu Meiniang entered the palace at the age of fourteen to serve as a concubine to Emperor Taizong of Tang. He acknowledges these talents and favors her after the death of Empress Zhangsun. She instead develops feelings for his son Li Zhi. She helped him gain prominence over his brothers Li Tai and Li Chengqian.

After the Crown Prince is deposed, Meiniang helped Li Zhi become the Crown Prince, and eventually emperor. He rescued her from a convent, and she is taken back to the palace after Emperor Taizong dies. She faces enemies such as Empress Wang and Consort Xiao, and several of Li Zhi's officials. After the downfall of Consort Xiao and Empress Wang, Meiniang ascends as Empress Wu. Her life isn't easy, because her sister the Lady of Han has an affair with Li Zhi and she is despised by Zhangsun Wuji. Since Li Zhi is often ill, Meiniang is in charge of politics.

== Cast ==
- Angela Pan as Wu Zetian / Princess Taiping (young)
- Liang Hsiu-shen as Emperor Taizong
- Fan Jih-hsing as Emperor Gaozong
- Ke Wei-chia as Li Xian
- Hua Shao-chiang as Li Dan
- Kao Pei-chun as Li Hong
- Hou Kuan-chun as Li Xian
- You Kuo-tung as Li Chengqian
- Ting Hua-chung as Li Tai
- Liu Lin as Li Yuanchang
- Tsui Hao-jan as Ming Xuewen
- Hsu Chia-jung as Cheng Nanying
- Chen Pei-ling as Empress Wang
- Liu Hsiao-ping as Lady of Han
- Pan Chin-hao as Helan Minzhi
- Kung Lien-hua as Consort Xiao
- Sihung Lung as Zhangsun Wuji
- Lin Hsiu-chun as Empress Zhangsun
- Chang Pi as Xiaoshunzi
- Chou Chung-lien as Shangguan Yi
- Pei Hsin-yu as Shangguan Wan'er
- Kuan Yi as Madam Liu
- Li Yih-min as Zhikong (Feng Xiaobao)
- Wang Jui as Chu Suiliang
- Tieh Meng-chiu as Wang Renyou
- Kao Chen-peng as Yuan Tiangang
- Nan Chun as Li Chunfeng
- Wu Fung as Di Renjie
- Yu Heng as Zhang Wenguan
- Min Min as Dai Zhide
- Chen You-hsin as Pei Yan
- Chen Cheng as Dahulu
- Fang Mian as Wu Shihuo
- Chang Chuan as Yao Lie
- Lu Pi-yun as Madam Zheng / Madam Yang
- Hu Wen-tou as eunuch
