= Sean Sun =

American biophysicist

Sean X. Sun is an American biophysicist.

Sun completed a Bachelor of Science degree from Pennsylvania State University in 1994, and obtained a doctorate at the University of California, Berkeley in 1998. He teaches at Johns Hopkins University, where he operates the Cell Mechanics Group laboratory. Sun was elected a fellow of the American Physical Society in 2016. The American Institute for Medical and Biological Engineering granted Sun an equivalent honor the following year.
