= Yang Tianzhen =

Chinese entertainment executive

Yang Tianzhen (simplified Chinese: 杨天真; traditional Chinese: 楊天真; pinyin: yáng tiānzhēn; born 25 January 1985), born Yang Siwei (simplified Chinese: 杨思维; traditional Chinese: 楊思維; pinyin: yáng sīwéi), is a Chinese entertainment executive and media personality. She began her career at Chengtian Entertainment as protégé of Wang Jinghua. From 2008 to 2014, she served as Head of Public Relations at Fan Bingbing Studio. In 2014, she co-founded Easy Entertainment. Since the late 2010s, she has transitioned from talent management to a media career of her own.

== Biography ==
Yang was born in Nanchang, Jiangxi. Her father worked as a train conductor, and her mother was a middle school English teacher. She attended Nanchang No. 2 High School, where she served both as President of the Student Union and Chair of the Nanchang Student Federation. She initially received a direct admission offer to Peking University, but lost eligibility after a re-evaluation of her sophomore biology exam resulted in a C grade, disqualifying her under the school’s “all A” admission rule. In 2002, she enrolled in the Directing Department at the Communication University of China, where she later became President of the School of Film and Television Arts Student Union.

In late 2005, during her senior year, Yang cold-texted renowned talent manager Wang Jinghua and successfully joined her Chengtian Entertainment, starting out in publicity. Yang subsequently handled PR for actors including Zuo Xiaoqing, Kong Wei, Tong Dawei, Song Jia, and Xia Yu.

In 2007, while managing publicity for Kong Wei, Yang orchestrated a birthday media moment for Kong at an event attended by Fan Bingbing. The move upstaged Fan but left a strong impression. After founding her own studio later that year, Fan personally recruited Yang in 2008. From 2008 to 2014, Yang served as Head of Public Relations at Fan Bingbing Studio.

In 2014, Yang founded Easy Entertainment with Lu Yao and Chen Jie. The management company rose to prominence in 2015 after signing Lu Han, who at the peak of his K-pop popularity had just returned to China to launch his solo career. Lu left the company in early 2018.

From 2018 to 2020, Yang pursued an EMBA at Peking University. She had originally planned to study abroad, but the plan was canceled following the global outbreak of COVID-19 in early 2020.

In 2019, Yang launched the reality series My Agent and I (我和我的经纪人), documenting the operations of Easy Entertainment. This marked her transition into a public-facing media personality, leading to frequent appearances on variety programs.

On June 1, 2020, she announced her departure from day-to-day talent management to enter the live-commerce sector for Easy Entertainment, later founding Plusmall, a plus-size women’s fashion label.

In 2024, she launched the podcast Tianzhen Is Not Naive (天真不天真) and served as a judge on the reality show Ride the Wind 2024 (乘風2024).

In 2023, Yang received admission to the one-year Public Policy Master’s program at the University of Southern California Marshall School of Business. After deferring for one year, she relocated to the United States to begin the program in May 2025.

== Controversy ==
=== Gastrectomy ===
In August 2020, during an appearance on the talk show Her Story: Thirty and Beyond (女人三十加), Yang recalled her mother urging her not to sacrifice her health for her career. She responded, “Why not? If I only have 30 years to live but every day is lived to the fullest, I’d still think it’s worth it.” The comment sparked debate about work, self-exploitation, and bodily autonomy.

Shortly after, she announced she would undergo gastrectomy, clarifying that the procedure was primarily to reduce blood sugar levels and treat diabetes, not simply for weight loss. On Weibo, she wrote: “This is my choice, my sacrifice, and my burden. It is a form of solitary resolve that flows through life. I do not impose this on anyone, nor do I recommend imitation. I hope everyone has a healthy and peaceful life.”

On August 12, after having four-fifths of her stomach surgically removed, she posted: “The surgery went well—reporting in. The anesthesia has worn off, so I’m back to work. Thank you for the care and advice. For someone like me, who only thinks in terms of goals and solutions, the only direction is forward. Rationality can feel cold—especially toward oneself.”
