= Eight Heroes =

2006 Chinese TV series

- Promotional poster
- 八大豪侠
- Genre: Wuxia
- Written by: Wong Jing; Chen Maoxian; Huang Haohua
- Directed by: Wong Jing; Wang Feng; Liu Yanhong; Xie Yihang
- Presented by: Huo Qi; Yang Buting; Ma Hexin
- Starring: Anthony Wong; Fan Bingbing; Lam Chi-chung; Li Bingbing; Edison Chen; Zheng Xiaodong; Damian Lau; Lu Yi; Li Xiaolu; Dong Xuan; Han Xiao
- Theme music composer: Wu Zhongheng; Li Tianhua
- Opening theme: "Hero's Heart" (英雄心) by Ying Changyou and Denise Ho
- Ending theme: "Fall Head Over Heels for You" (愛到死心塌地) by Dong Xuan
- Country of origin: China
- Original language: Mandarin
- No. of episodes: 40 (DVD); 48 (VCD)

Production
- Executive producers: Chen Hua; Chen Wei; Zhang Huijian; Wang Guangqun; Li Yue; Wu Kexiang; Xue Wenchi; Jiang Tao; Li Chunchen
- Producers: Liu Xiaolin; Han Sanping; Dong Ping
- Production location: China
- Running time: ≈45 minutes per episode

Eight Heroes (八大豪侠) is a 2006 Chinese wuxia television series directed and written by Wong Jing, starring an ensemble cast from mainland China and Hong Kong. Set in 12th-century China during the Song dynasty, it follows a group of eight heroes – each with his/her own special skills – who band together to oppose the corrupt premier Qin Hui.

== Synopsis ==
The series is set in 12th-century China during the Song dynasty. Emperor Gaozong, deceived by the treacherous premier Qin Hui, orders the execution of the loyal general Yue Fei. In the aftermath, Qin Hui and his supporters control the Song government, leading to widespread corruption and nepotism. Some righteous officials oppose Qin Hui but dare not challenge him directly, so they form a secret organisation called Haoxia to undermine his influence. The story then follows several loosely connected subplots involving the heroes, and ends with a grand finale of a showdown between the heroes and Qin Hui's forces.

== Cast ==
- Anthony Wong as Yan Tiexin
- Damian Lau as Guan Yulou
- Lu Yi as Ping Chang
- Li Bingbing as Feng Laiyi
- Li Xiaolu as Le Qianqian
- Dong Xuan as Bian Suwen
- Zheng Xiaodong as Feng Yizhen
- Lam Chi-chung as Dongguo Ren
- Edison Chen as Xie Jiaqi
- Fan Bingbing as Chu Xiangxiang
- Han Xiao as Di Sanniang
- Li Guohua as Qin Hui
- Chen Zhihui as Meng Tianwen
- Wu Qingzhe as the Crown Prince
- Tian Min as the Empress
- Shen Lan as Lianhua
- Xie Yuanjiang as Fang Dongyue
- Cao Zheng as Yang Chen
- Zhou Zhong as Blood Bat
- Zhou Ying as Xi Ning
- Zhang Liang as Gu Beichuan
- Liu Yiwei as Lai San
- Wei Hua as Zhuge Chaoming
- Ni Zengzhao as Wen Yaonan
- Chen Ke as Jia Dapeng
- Sun Mengmeng as Jingrong
- Ma Ji as Liu Qing
- Huang Wei as Tianji Old Man
- Guo Hongjie as Eagle King
- Chen Tao as Qin Xi
- Qian Youyou as Feng Yizhen's mother
