= Jiang Long =

Chinese physical chemist (1933–2022)

- 江龙
- Born: 1 January 1933; Shanghai, China
- Died: 31 December 2022 (aged 89); Beijing, China
- Education: Nanjing University; Soviet Academy of Sciences
- Scientific career
- Fields: Colloid; Interface chemistry
- Workplaces: Institute of Photosensitivity, Chinese Academy of Sciences

Chinese name
- Simplified Chinese: 江龙
- Traditional Chinese: 江龍
Transcriptions
Standard Mandarin
- Hanyu Pinyin: Jiāng Lóng

Jiang Long (Chinese: 江龙; 1 January 1933 – 31 December 2022) was a Chinese physical chemist, and an academician of the Chinese Academy of Sciences. He was a member of the Chinese Communist Party (CCP).

== Biography ==
Jiang was born in Shanghai, on 1 January 1933, while his ancestral home is in Jian'ou, Fujian. He joined the Chinese Communist Party (CCP) in December 1949. In 1950, he was admitted to Nanjing University, where he majored in the Department of Chemistry. After graduating in 1953, he was despatched to the Changchun Institute of Physical Chemistry, Chinese Academy of Sciences. In 1956, he was sent to study at the Soviet Academy of Sciences on government scholarships, obtaining a vice-doctorate degree in 1960.

Jiang returned to China in 1960 and that same year became a member of the Institute of Chemistry, Chinese Academy of Sciences. He moved to the Institute of Photosensitivity, Chinese Academy of Sciences in 1970, where he was promoted to associate research fellow in 1979 and to research fellow in 1986. From December 1990 to June 1991, he was a visiting scholar at the Max Planck Institute of Biophysical Chemistry in Germany. He rose to become director of the Academic Committee of Key Laboratory of Colloids and Interfaces, Chinese Academy of Sciences in 1998.

Jiang died in Beijing on 31 December 2022, at the age of 89.

== Honours and awards ==
- 1999 Member of the Chinese Academy of Sciences (CAS)
- 2008 Fellow of the Royal Society of Chemistry (RSC)
