= Du Guangting =

Chinese writer

Du Guangting (杜光庭; 850–933) was a Taoist priest from Tiantai Mountain and prolific author during the Tang dynasty and the Five Dynasties and Ten Kingdoms period.

Du Guangting made significant contributions to the development of Daoist ritual practice, especially regarding the popular fasting retreats (zhai). Many of his writings deal with rituals and related topics. His works draw on the liturgies and scriptures of both the Celestial Masters and the Numinous Treasure traditions of Daoism.

He is also known for having edited and reconstructed the Daoist canon (Daozang) from the libraries in Sichuan. This was necessary as during the Huang Chao Rebellion (880–885) and the sack of Chang'an, many Daoist scriptures were lost.

His most famous work was a short novel entitled The Man with the Curly Beard (虯髯客傳), sometimes considered the earliest novel in the wuxia genre.

Du also wrote a commentary to the Daodejing (the Daode zhenjing guangsheng, Extended Interpretation of the Emperor's Exegesis of the Authentic Scripture of the Dao and its Virtue), which is an annotated commentary on Tang Xuanzong's commentary to the Daodejing. He also wrote numerous works on Daoist myths, supernatural stories and legends. In Dongtian fudi yuedu mingshan ji, Du compiled Daoist sacred sites, and built a geographical framework for these sites.
