= Double Xposure =

2012 film directed by Li Yu

- Film poster
- Directed by: Li Yu
- Written by: Li Yu; Fang Li
- Produced by: Fang Li
- Starring: Fan Bingbing; Feng Shaofeng; Huo Siyan
- Cinematography: Florian Zinke (Lu Yifan)
- Edited by: Li Yu; Ze Yuan
- Music by: Howie B
- Production companies: Laurel Films; Emei Film Studio
- Distributed by: Beijing Shengshi Xinying Film and TV Distribution Co.
- Release date: September 29, 2012
- Running time: 105 minutes
- Country: China
- Language: Mandarin
- Budget: ¥45,000,000
- Box office: ¥108,720,000

Double Xposure is a 2012 Chinese psychological thriller film directed by Li Yu starring Fan Bingbing and Feng Shaofeng. Upon release, Double Xposure became a commercial success, earning over ¥100 million in mainland China, which made Li Yu the 52nd director whose single film's box office was more than ¥100 million.

== Plot ==
When Song Qi stumbles upon her boyfriend, Liu Dong's (Feng Shaofeng) affair with her best friend, Xiaoxi (Huo Siyan), her life quickly starts falling apart and she is subsequently drawn into revenge and murder. Though all is not as it seems and Song Qi will have to embark on a twisted journey into her past and the very depths of her own mind.

Song Qi confronts Xiaoxi about her affair with her boyfriend, in which Xiaoxi states that Liu Dong really loves her instead of Song Qi. Song Qi starts verbally and physically abusing Xiaoxi, and Xiaoxi finally breaks apart and calls Liu Dong. Song Qi becomes murderous and used an orange scarf of Xiaoxi's to strangle her to death.

Song Qi comes back to Xiaoxi's house at night and buries her underneath bricks in her garden. She then confronts her boyfriend, Liu Dong, also about the affair. Liu Dong denies at first but then he admits to liking Xiaoxi. Song Qi weeps sadly and the two's love relationship takes a harsh downward spiral.

A policeman, Liu Jian (Fang Li), visits Song Qi after a few days to question about Xiaoxi's sudden disappearance and also her whereabouts. Song Qi denies that she know where Xiaoxi is. The police remains suspicious, but he leaves. Song Qi starts having hallucinations and nightmares at night of Xiaoxi visiting her and haunting her. A few more days pass and Liu Dong is also suspicious about Song Qi. He confronts her and shows her the orange scarf that Song Qi choked Xiaoxi with. He claims that he gave her the scarf, and he knows she couldn't have bought an identical one because the orange scarf's patterns are askew, and he will show the police about it. Song Qi is terrified and she tries to take it back, but she fails. Liu Dong shows the orange scarf to Liu Jian the next day.

Song Qi then makes a run for it when she stumbles into Liu Dong showing the orange scarf to the Liu Jian. She drives into the wilderness to a lake. She jumps into the lake to swim but she quickly gets out when she saw a hallucination of Xiaoxi swimming also in the lake. Later, she eats at a restaurant when she saw Liu Jian coming into the restaurant and questioning people, presumably about her. She hides and runs out the restaurant via the kitchens. She stumbles in the forest and knocks her head on a tree, creating a bloody mark on her head.

She finds her car and starts to drive rapidly away when she accidentally runs over Liu Jiang coming out the woods. Song Qi climbs out the car and checks on Liu Jiang. She weeps and call the police, and eventually falls asleep. When she awakes, she sees a female policewoman shaking her. Song Qi says to the policewoman that she ran over a policeman named Liu Jian except there is no body and no evidence of damage on her car's hood. The policewoman takes her to the station where she finds out that there is no officer in the police station named Liu Jian. She then finds out that her boyfriend, Liu Dong, is not real and that her best friend, Xiaoxi, is alive and is on a holiday abroad.

Song Qi discovers that everything happening before was actually hallucinations and was really a replay of what happened before in her life. When Song Qi was little, she witnessed her mother, Wang Meiling (Kong Wei), being strangled by her father, Wang Teihui (Yao An-Lian). Her father had used an orange scarf to commit the murder. He had done it out of anger when he found out that Meiling was having an affair with their lawyer, Liu Jian (Fang Li). He then storms away and disappears, presumed dead by everyone.

Song Qi was then adopted by Liu Jian. Liu Jian had a son named Liu Dong in which Song Qi was deeply in love with. After many years when Song Qi and Liu Dong was finished with college, Liu Jian decided to take a trip alone to visit Song Qi's biological father, Teihui. On the way to Xinjiang, he was in a car crash and died. Song Qi was ballistic when she found out and it was then she went crazy and started having hallucinations. She broke away from the real Liu Dong, and started having a boyfriend-girlfriend relationship with a fake Liu Dong she made up in her mind but believed to be real.

When she finally found out about her father, he was dying. He expressed immense regret over what he did and wishes she would take his ashes with her. Song Qi then puts his cremation urn with her mother's.

She finally decides to search for the real Liu Dong. When she finally finds him at the beach in Qinghuangdao, gazing into the sea, she taps him on the shoulder in which he responded by turning around. They both express longing and love for each other and embraces. Liu Dong states, "You have been away for so long". Finally, Song Qi answers with, "Actually, you were with me the whole time".

== Cast ==
- Fan Bingbing as Song Qi
- Feng Shaofeng as Liu Dong
- Huo Siyan as Xiaoxi
- Joan Chen as Doctor Hao
- Kong Wei as Wang Meiling, Song Qi's biological mother
- Yao An-lian as Wang Tiehui, Song Qi's biological father
- Fang Li as Liu Jian, Song Qi's adoptive father

== Technical details ==
The film was digitally shot using the Arri Alexa camera along with ARRI master prime and Alura zoom lenses by German cinematographer Florian Zinke who worked as second cinematographer for Li Yu's previous film, Buddha Mountain. In addition, flashback sequences were shot on 16mm film. Scratches and dust were deliberately left on the 16mm scan and barely graded during post production to achieve a stylized look. The film's aspect ratio is 2.40:1.

== Promotion ==
To promote this film, Fan Bingbing went to more than 20 cinemas in different cities across China, including Beijing, Shanghai, Shenzhen, Chengdu, Wuhan. She also appeared on 14 magazines' covers and the media called her the first lady of the National Day Holiday.

== Reception ==
=== Box office ===
The film had a Chinese domestic gross of RMB 108,720,000, and that was a huge commercial success compared with the budget RMB 45,000,000.

=== Critical reception ===
This film received mixed reviews. It got 6.2 score based upon 65854 users' ratings in the Chinese domestic movie website Douban, and got 6.5 score based upon 4021 users' ratings in another Chinese domestic movie website Mtime.com. But the film critics gave high praise to Fan Bingbing's performance.

=== Awards ===
- Huading Award - Best Actress (Fan Bingbing), Best Film OST
