= List of TVB dramas in 2025 =

These are the dramas that releases by TVB

This is a list of television serial dramas released by TVB in 2025, including highest-rated television dramas and award ceremonies.

== Top ten drama series in ratings ==
The following is a list of TVB's top serial dramas in 2025 by viewership ratings. The recorded ratings include premiere week, final week, finale episode, and the average overall count of live Hong Kong viewers (in millions).

Highest-rated drama series of 2025
Rank	English title	Chinese title	Average	Peak	Premiere week	Final week	Series finale	HK viewers (millions)
1	Heroes in White	俠醫	24.2					
2	Prism Breakers	執法者們	23.3					
3	Anonymous Signal	奪命提示	23					
4	The Queen of News 2	新聞女王2	22.6					
5	Heavenly Hand	麻雀樂團	20.5					
6	D.I.D 12	刑偵12	20.4					
7	Battle Of Marriage	奔跑吧！勇敢的女人們	20.4					
8	The Fading Gold	金式森林	19.6					
9	The Queen of Castle	巨塔之后	19.5					
10	Your Finesse	痞子無間道	19.5					

== Awards ==
Category/Organization	TVB Anniversary Awards 04 January 2026
TVB Greater Bay Area Most Favourite Variety and Documentary Program	A Date with Goddess
TVB Greater Bay Area Most Favourite Drama	The Queen of News 2
TVB Greater Bay Area Most Favourite Actor	Bosco Wong – The Queen of News 2
TVB Greater Bay Area Most Favourite Actress	Charmaine Sheh – The Queen of News 2
Best Drama	The Queen of News 2
Best Actor	Bosco Wong – The Queen of News 2
Best Actress	Charmaine Sheh – The Queen of News 2
Best Supporting Actor	Matthew Ho – The Queen of News 2
Best Supporting Actress	Venus Wong – The Queen of News 2
Most Improved Actor	James Ng
Most Improved Actress	Sophie Yip
TVB Male Newcomer	Kevin Liu Yang Mason Fung Ho-yeung
TVB Female Newcomer	Carmen Ngai Ka Man
Best Theme Song	"Seeds of Truth" by Windy Zhan – The Queen of News 2
Best TVB Variety Program	Midlife, Sing & Shine! 3
Best TVB informatics Program	Scoop
Best Dressed Female Artist on Red Carpet	Hera Chan
Best Dressed Male Artist on Red Carpet	Brian Chu
Best TVB Male Host	Bob Lam Shing Bun
Best TVB Female Host	Stephanie Che
TVB Professional Spirit Award	Cheung Zai-yan
TVB Glory Legend Award	Eric Tsang

== First line-up ==
These dramas air in Hong Kong every Sunday to Friday from 8:00 pm to 8:30 pm on Jade. Remark: Starting on 6 Jan 2025, these dramas air in Hong Kong every Monday to Friday from 8:00 pm to 8:30 pm on Jade. Starting on 1 Nov 2025 through 7 Nov 2025, these dramas air will be extend at 8:30 PM to 9:30 PM on Jade.

Broadcast	English title (Chinese title)	Eps.	Cast and crew	Theme song(s)	Avg. rating	Genre	Ref.
(from 2024); 20 Feb 2017– 7 Aug 2026 (to 2026)	Come Home Love: Lo and Behold 愛·回家之開心速遞	2868	Sandy Shaw, Law Chun-ngok (producers); Ma Chun-ying, Lee Yi-wah, Yuen Bo-wai (writers); Lau Dan, Pal Sinn, Angela Tong, Koni Lui, Andrew Chan, Andrea So, Veronica Shiu, Joyce Tang, Kalok Chow, Law Lok-lam, Geoffrey Wong, Mark Ma, Ricco Ng, Hoffman Cheng, Mandy Lam, Kim Li	"這個家" (This home) by Chantel Yiu	TBA	Sitcom, supernatural	

== Second line-up ==
These dramas air in Hong Kong from 8:30 pm to 9:30 pm, Monday to Friday on Jade. Remark: There will be no episode broadcast on 1 Nov through 7 Nov 2025 due to the dramas of Come Home Love: Lo and Behold one hour episodes on Jade

Background shading indicates dramas not produced by TVB.

Broadcast	English title (Chinese title)	Eps.	Cast and crew	Theme song(s)	Avg. rating	Genre	Ref.
(from 2024); 30 Dec- 24 Jan	Battle Of Marriage 奔跑吧! 勇敢的女人們	20	Steffie Lai (producer); Lam Wai-cheng (screenwriter); Edwin Siu, Jinny Ng, Brian Chu, Winki Lai, Eric Tang, Eyvonne Lam, Anthony Ho, Kevin Tong, Rainbow Ching, Nicole Wan, Cheung Sze-yan, Verena Wong, Chun Kai-wai, Carman Kwan, English Tang, Timothy Ho, Wong Yat-ming, Nina Li, Kate Ng, Ball Mang	Can you be moved again? (再度能感動嗎) by Edwin Siu, Jinny Ng Have a good time or not? (好好過不好過) by Vivian Koo Finally come now (終於走到現在) by Felix Lam	20.4	Comedy, action, drama	
27 Jan- 07 Feb	Other People's Money 富貴千團	10	Kwan Man Shum (producer); Frances To, Kin-Lok Kwok, Sun Nga (screenwriters); Roxanne Tong, Telford Wong, Lucas Yiu, Ram Chiang, Benjamin Au Yeung, Bowie Cheung, Stephen Wong Ka-lok, Hugo Wong, Kelly Fu, Tyson Chak, Hoi Bok Nono Yeung, Andy Lau Tin-lung, Mary Hon, Bella Lam, Henry Lee Hin Yiu, Arthur Sy, Mina Kwok, Snow Suen, Joyce Chong, Chloe So, Willie Wai, Geoffrey Wong, Parkman Raphael Wong, Miguel Choi, Eric Cheng, Sonya Chan, Sophie Yip, Kris Lam, Ceci Mak, Terence Tung, Ricky Wong, Andy Shiu, Deborah Poon, Danny Lo, Connie Lam, Bert Mok, Akai Lee, Stephanie Lee, Clevis Tam, Sunny Dai, Timothy Ho, Christine Chu, Purple Ng, Rachel Wong, Liam Fung, Markii Lee, Thomas Ng, Blossom Chan, Tiffany Choi, Kitty Lai, Eddie Pang, Felix Ng, Peter Chan, Hoi Yeung, So Lai Ming, Jenny Wong, Kelvin Liu, Chiu Lok Yin, Sandy Leung, Yeung Yee Yee, William Chan, KC Chun, Iva Liu, Fanny Lee, Henry Lo, Roxanne Ho, Melody Kan, Keith Mok, Dolby Kwan, Kitty Lau, Alan Wu, English Tang, Edith Au, Law Suet, Bond Chan, Doris Chow, Vivian Tsang, Leo Tsang, Man Ngai, Burmie Wong, Man Yeung, Joan Lee, David Do, Vincent Choi, Athena Ng, Eddie Li, Yancy Wong	Urban legend (都市傳說) by Aeren Man Que Sera, Sera (Whatever will be, will be In English) by Kayee Tam	18.1	Fashion, suspense, financial, romantic comedy	
10 Feb- 14 Mar	Your Finesse 痞子無間道	25	Andy Chan (producer); Kwan Chung Ling, Cheung Sai-Cheung (writer); Kalok Chow, Jeannie Chan, Joey Wong, Brian Chu, Mayanne Mak, Hugo Wong, Raymond Cho, Stephanie Che, Willie Wai, Eyvonne Lam, Lincoln Hui, Chan Wing Chun, Man Yeung	See you tomorrow (明日見) by Joey Wong	19.5	Historical period drama, Comedy	
17 Mar- 25 Apr	Anonymous Signal 奪命提示	30	Jazz Boon (producer); King Wai Tam, Yan-Tung Leung, Kin Ping Tong (writers); Joel Chan, Owen Cheung, Moon Lau, Tiffany Lau, Karl Ting, Rosita Kwok, Jazz Lam, Hugo Wong, Brian Tse, KK Chueng, Carl Ng, Eric Tang, Man Yeung, Kelvin Yuen, Wong Fei, Alan Chow, Carina Leung, Jerry Leung, Oscar Kwok, Keith Ng, Rosanne Lui, Mary Hon, Griselda Yeung, Ethan Lam King Ching, Henry Lo, Sunny Dai, Derek Wong, Curtis Ho, Stephanie Au, Meefee Fung, Lincoln Hui, Cheryl Tong, Bond Chan, Ceci Mak, Joan Lee, Lesley Chung, Waylon Chan, Isabella Hsu, Amy Fan, Bob Cheung, Axity Chong, Nicole Wan, Arnold Kwok, Kenneth Ma	Moving Forward (前行吧) by Rock Ho Still Want to Believe You (仍然很想相信你) by Shiga Lin All Open Up (一切豁開) by James Ng	23	Action, Crime drama, Thriller	
28 Apr- 16 May	Love Virtually 虛擬情人	15	Stephen Tsui, Lam Wai Ching (producers); Shanying Weng (writers); Venus Wong, Kayee Tam, Brian Chu, Hugo Wong, Eric Tang, Ethan Lam, Griselda Yeung, Geoffrey Albert Wong, Andrew Yuen Man-kit, Paisley Hu, Carmen Ngai, Daniel Chau, Irina Tang, Kelvin Liu, Timothy Ho, KC Chun, Joey Miu, Venus Tang, Moses Chan	The Familiar You (熟悉的你) by Kayee Tam Castle in the Air (In English) by Venus Wong	17	Sci-fi, Comedy, Fashion Love Drama	
19 May- 20 Jun	D.I.D 12 刑偵12	25	Shu-kai Chung, Ralph Chau (producers); Sai-Keung Fong, Frankie Tam, Guo Hao-ren (writers); Bowie Lam, Monica Chan, Owen Cheung, Kelly Fu, Yoyo Chen, Raymond Cho, Joey Thye, Matthew Ko, Deon Cheung, James Ng, Pat Poon, Gary Chan, Jack Wu, Vincent Lam Wai, Bond Chan, Adrien Yau, Ronny Lay, Lucas Yiu, Amber Chan, Susan Tse, Nina Li Hoi-tung, Lincoln Hui, Benjamin Yuen, Flora Chan	We and us (我和我們) in Mandarin by Bowie Lam, Owen Cheung, James Ng, Ronny Lay, Jinny Ng, Joey Thye, Zev Leong, Giselle	21.5	Crime Thriller, Mystery, Urban Legend, Paranormal	
23 Jun- 25 July	Prism Breakers 執法者們	25	Virginia Lok (producer); Lui Koon Nam, Frankie Tam Kwong-Yuen (writers); Bosco Wong, Moses Chan, Kenneth Ma, Lawrence Ng, Him Law, Jessica Hsuan, Jeannie Chan, Moon Lau, Jacky Cai, Sharon Chan, Tiffany Lau, Oscar Leung, Regina Ho, Tony Hung, Yvette Chan, Dominic Lam, Raymond Cho, Tsui Wing, Kyle Lee, Oscar Tao, Ronny Lay, Pat Poon, King-kong Lam, Karl Ting, Mary Hon	I don't want to put you down (不想將你放下) by Dickson Wong, Supper Moment, Adrian Chan	23.3	Crime drama, Fashion Discipline Force	
28 July- 29 Aug	Heavenly Hand 麻雀樂團	25	Marco Law (producer); Benny Wong (writer); Shaun Tam, Ali Lee, David Chiang, Brian Tse, Telford Wong, Rosita Kwok, Willie Wai, Derek Kwok, Kelvin Liu, Stephen Ho, Karen Wu, Janees Wong, Edwin Siu	Corner (轉角) / Effects dated (有效日期) by Janees Wong	20.5	Comedy, Modern drama	
1 Sep- 26 Sep	Heroes In White 俠醫	20	Chan Peng (producer); Mak Sai-lung, Steffie Lai (writers); Moses Chan, Kelly Cheung, Moon Lau, Karl Ting, Zoie Tam, Elvina Kong, Mark Ma, Timothy Cheng, Rosita Kwok, Kayan Yau, Mason Fung, Albert Cheung, Angelina Lo, Agnes Lam, Rainbow Ching	The best relief (最好的信念) by Leo Ku	24.2	Love, Medical drama	
29 Sep- 31 Oct	The Queen Of Castle 巨塔之后	25	Chung Shu-kai (film producer); Lister Chan, Sandy, Osan (producers); Jessica Hsuan, Kenny Bee, Ruco Chan, Kenneth Ma, Edwin Siu, Jonathan Cheung, Kent Tong, Susan Tse, Alice Chan, Moon Lau, Jinny Ng, Angel Chiang, Celina Harto, Pat Poon, Hugo Ng, Ronny Lay, Telford Wong, Ethan Lam King Ching, Kaka Lok, Akina Hong, Eva Lai, Gordon Ip, Yen To Yin Gor, Mason Fung, Osanna Chiu, Rosanne Lui, Timothy Cheng, Lincoln Hui	Prologue - Conclusion (序章·結局) by Windy Zhan Deep In My Heart (In English) by Janees Wong What You've Left Behind (In English) by Quinn Lui	19.5	Modern, Medical drama	
10 Nov- 15 Dec	The Queen of News 2 新聞女王2	25	Shu-kai Chung, Kwan Man Shum, Quan Xiang-Lan (producers); Kwok Kin-Lok (screenwriter); Charmaine Sheh, Bosco Wong, Kenneth Ma, Samantha Ko, Venus Wong, Selena Li, Hera Chan, Mimi Kung, Shaun Tam, Matthew Ho, James Ng, Jacky Cai, Eric Tang, Matthew Ko, Joman Chiang, Pat Ha, Sam Tsang, Tyson Chak, Emily Kwan, Pat Poon, Rosanne Lui, Kelly Fu, Celina Harto, Rosita Kwok, Ruth Tsang, Alex Tse, Tsui Wing, KC Wu, Vivian Koo, Oscar Tao, Niklas Lam, Lucas Yiu, Jessica Liu, Sophie Ngan, Stephen Ho, Wong Wai Tong, Milkson Fong, So Lai Ming, Natalie Cho, Kason Ka Chun, Cheng Shu Fung, Rainbow Ching, Ricky Wong, Deon Cheung, Carlos Koo, Rachel Lam, Heidi Chu, Kitterick Yiu, Evergreen Mak, Ashley Yan	Crystal Clear (In English) by Queenie Quinn Lui Seeds of Truth (In English) by Windy Zhan	22.6	Investigation, Fashion, Business	
16 Dec- 16 Jan (to 2026)	Homeland Guardian 守诚者	24	Law Wing Cheong, Liu Shun An (directors); Chan Man Keung, Ma Yan, Ma Shuai, Fu Xiao Pu, Su Bing (writers); Jordan Chan, Peter Ho, Simon Yam, Aarif Rahman, Cecilia Han, Joyce Tang, Carmen Tong, Karan Choi, Waise Lee, Stephen Wong Ka-lok, Lynn Dai-Lin Xiong, Loletta Rachel Lee Lai Chun, Christine Ng, Carl Ng, Ai Wai, KK Cheung, Sammy Sum, Kent Tong, Michael Chan, Glen Lee, Debbie Lo, Christopher Sin, Kenneth Lai, Kevin Tong, Mike Sui, Cherry Lee, Chen Wei Meng, Power Chan, Charlene Houghton, Alice Fung, Simon Lo, Parkman Raphael Wong, Keith Ng, Pearl Poon, Luvin Ho, Willie Lau, Philippe Joly	Comrades (同袍) by Alan Tam	20.2	Crime drama, Police Tactical	

== Third line-up ==
These dramas air in Hong Kong from 9:30 pm to 10:30 pm, Monday to Friday on Jade. Remark: There will be no episode broadcast on 28 and 29 Jan 2025 due to the Lunar New Year festival.

Background shading indicates dramas not produced by TVB.

Broadcast	English title (Chinese title)	Eps.	Cast and crew	Theme song(s)	Avg. rating	Genre	Ref.
(from 2024); 04 Dec- 03 Jan	Heroes 说英雄谁是英雄	22	Fang Fang (producer); Li Mu Ge (director); Shuang Cheng (screenwriter); Joseph Zeng, Yang Chaoyue, Liu Yuning, Baron River Chan, Meng Ziyi, Kris Sun Zujun, Zeng Yi-Xuan, Fan Zhen, Feng Shao, Gallen Lo	Legend of Heroes (英雄傳奇) by Zayden Pang, Duncan How, Timothy Chan, Vivian Kong, Desta Li	15	Historical period drama, wuxia	
06 Jan- 27 Jan	Fry To The Moon 麻辣商驕	16	Han Sanping (producer); Qin Wen (screenwriter); Du Xiao Yu (director); Song Yi, Charmaine Sheh, Li Chun, Zhang Guoli, Juck Zhang Chao, Wang Renjun, Li Shen, Haoyue Huang, Caesar Guo Cheng, Xuan Yan, Liu Jie, Chen Wei, Fenny Wu, Feng Guo Qiang, Gao Hai Peng, Jia Jin, Kudousi Jiang Ainiwaer, Wu Hong, Wang Chuan, Long Bin, Chenxia Liu, Yukun Xu, Wang Jinghua, Thomas Tom Price, Jayden Pan, Yu Pei Shan, Fiona Fan Zhen, Zhou Lang, Leon Lee, Zhang Ting Fei, Jun Wang, Joycee Chen, Vicky Li Qin-Fei, Aiting Su, Bei Le, Shen Sheng-nan	Spicy business pride (麻辣商驕) by Joey Thye	16.2	Food, romantic drama, life	
30 Jan- 25 Feb	See Her Again 太陽星辰	18	Ng Man Ching (cinematography); Wong Kwok Keung (director); Tong Yiu-leung (writer); William Chan, Cya Liu, Stephen Fung, Niki Chow, Gardner Tse, Kevin Chu, Alan Luk, Ling Man Leung, He Dujuan, Ben Yuen, Hugo Ng, Evergreen Mak, Stephanie Che, Sean Wong Tsz-lok, German Cheung, Penny Chan, Wong Chun-yue, Jason Wu, Deon Cheung, Jeana Ho, Himmy Wong, Kathy Yuen, Sammy Sum, Mandy Chung, Kumer So Wai Chuen, Crystal Kwok, Ko Hon Man, Gary Lee, Pancy Chan, Frederic Kwok, Joseph Yeung, Eric Cheng, Ricky Chan	No regrets in this life (無悔這一生) by Beyond	16.4	Crime drama, thriller, mystery, time travel	
26 Feb- 11 Apr	Guardians of the Dafeng 大奉打更人	31	Hou Xiaonan, Cao Huayi (producers); Liu Wenyang (executive producer); Deng Ke (director); Yang Yuchen (writer); Dylan Wang, Vivian Tian, Liu Min, Kevin Yan, Zhang Miaoyi, Wang Runze, Scarlett Wang, Du Chun, Wang Gang, Liu Jun, Zhang Wen, Chen Xiao Yun, Estelle Chen, Ni Hongjie, Miaoyi Zhang, Peter Ho, Edward Zhang, Terry Chiu, Mikan Liu, Aggiem Li, Aisling Jiang, Mako Zhang, Zhao Ke, He Ziming, Leo Li, Fan Shuai Qi, Kang Kang, Deng Ying, Yihong Liu, Vicki Dong, Guo Tong Xi, Yiyao Wang, Flynn Ji Xiao Fei, ZiXin Wei, Yao Yiqi, Liu Guanlin, Hou Changrong, Zhao Bin, He Qiang, He Yi Wan, Song Han Yu, Sun Zheng Lin, Lei Fu, Xiao-hui Mao, Yan Pei Lun, Fan Shiqi, Yue Yang	Script kill (劇本殺) by Aska Cheung	16.4	Historical period drama, comedy, fantasy	
14 Apr- 26 May	Joy Of Life 2 慶餘年2	31	Ma Jun, Li Er Yun, Yu Wan Qin, Xiaobo Zhao, Hu Po, Ma Jianxiong, Liao Yixuan (producers); Zhang Ruoyun, Sweet Li Qin, Chen Daoming, Wu Gang, Tian Yu, Li Xiaoran, Faye Yu, Yuan Quan, Mao Xiaotong, Guo Qilin, Song Yi, Xin Zhilei, Liu Duan Duan, Ning Li, Haowei Zhang, Fu Xinbo, Gao Shuguang, Ke Zhao, Yang Yu, Qiang Li, Liu Hua, Tong Mengshi, Guo Zifan, Gina Jin Chen, Wang Churan, Gao Lu, Sunny Xiaochen Wang, Junbo Sui, Grace Guei, Yu Ailei, Yanjun Bi, Luo Er-yang, Xingjian Wu, Wang Qingxiang, Xu Zhi Sheng, Cui Zhigang, Jia Fu, Yann, Anlian Yao, Yan Qin, Tonghui Wang, Shen Xiaohai, Feng Bing, Jerry Chang, Wang Jianguo, Guanxiang Liu, Feng Enhe, Zhenting Zhao, Kefei Dong, Li Shen, Cui Peng, Marc Jia Jinghui, Wang Tian Chen, Dai Wen Wen, Wang Cheng Yang, Zhang Chi, Lingfeng Zuo, Tong Liu, Zhang Weiyi, Dong Jing Chuan, Yang Tong, Louis Sun, Yu Xiaoming, Li Luoan	Time traveler (穿越者) by Raymond Tam	19.3	Historical period drama	
27 May- 23 Jun	Riverside Code at Qingming Festival 清明上河圖密碼	20	Ma Jun, Zhang Yuanhuan, Zhang Xiaozhou (producers); Yang Fan, Xiong Chen (directors); Steven Zhang, Bai Baihe, Zhou Yiwei, Hou Yansong, Gala Zhang Yao, Xia Meng, Lin Jiachuan, Stephen Shi An, Hao Fushen, Hao Han, Li Naiwen, Hai Yitian, Zhang Xinyu, Jiang Peiyao, Una You Jingru, Wang Duo, Zhang Tianyang, Wang Peilu, Monica Mok, Song Chuyan, Lin Peng, Lu Yan Qi, Ren Yunjie, Li Yinan	One day to get a certificate (有天做證) by Ramon Lo	16.4	Historical period drama	
24 Jun- 01 Aug	A Better Life 蛮好的人生	28	Wang Jun (director); Fei Huijun, Li Xiaoliang (writers); Xiao Bing, Dai Zhongwei (executive producers); Susan Sun Li, Dong Zijian, Myolie Wu, Gao Xin, Sebrina Chen, Weiluo Xu, Lei Tong, Ye Qing, Vivian Wu, Zhang Chenguang, Feng Lei, Zhao Longhao, Connie Kang, Fenny Wu, Jade Cheng, Vincent Lin, Jeremy Qu, Liu Jun, Morni Chang	Money (錢) by Albert Chau Exhale (吐氣) by Bo Huang Wong-pok	18.3	Family, fashion	
04 Aug- 12 Sep	The Legend of Zang Hai 藏海傳	30	Zheng Xiaolong, Cao Yiwen (directors); Zhao Liuyi (writer); Kennedy Xu (creator); Sean Xiao-zhan, Huang Jue, Zhang Jingyi, Zhou Qi, Liang Chao, Song Yuan Fu, Bosh Yang Bo-xiao, Ryan Liu-chao, Jin Tie Feng, Qiao Zhenyu, Wallace Chung, Michelle Chen, Tian Xiaojie, Zhao Zi Qi, Michelle Bai, Cao Jia Xu, Yu Nan, Huang Jun-peng, Shao Wen, Sze Yu, Cheung Dok, Lin Yadong, Amelie Xu, Jiang Rui Lin, Zhang Guo Qiang	Under the sun (日光之下) / Tibetan Sea (藏海) by Vic Teo	16.1	Revenge, Ancient, Historical period drama	
15 Sep- 10 Oct	The Legend of Heroes 華山論劍	20	Liu Ming Li (producer); Li Hai Shu, Cao Xiao Tian, Cheng Ting Yu, Huang Yan Wei (screenwriters); Vengo Gao Wei Guang, Alex Yiwei Zhou, Peter Ho, Ming Dao, Chen Duling, Hankiz Omar, Zoey Meng Ziyi, Nick He Yuyiqian	Contend (爭鋒) by Alex Lau	17.4	Historical period drama, Wuxia, fantasy	
13 Oct- 14 Nov	The Fading Gold 金式森林	25	Catherina Tsang, Lam Chi-wah (producer); Sai-Leung Mak, Cheng Shing-mo (writers); Roger Kwok, Him Law, Mimi Kung, Hera Chan, Matthew Ho, Kaman Kong, Regina Ho, Joey Law, Rosita Kwok, Hillary Chong, Mary Hon, Li Shing-cheong, Tsui Wing, Law Lan, Rainbow Ching, Toby Chan, Andrew Chan, Yvette Chan, Helen Ng, Alan Kwan, Willie Lau, Kevin Tong, King Kong Lam, Terence Siu, Michelle Tsang, Tiffany Choi, Chan Wing-chun, Leo Tsang, Jack Hui, Cheung Sze-yan, Athena Ng, Winter Leung, Chik Tung-lam, Kanice Lau, Josephine Hung, Skylar Lo, Billy Cheung, Andy Shui, Stephen Ho, Keith Ng, Frankie Choi, Jerry Leung, Eric Tang, Chun Kai-wai, Thomas Sin, Arthur Sy, Jan Tse, Cecilia So, Samantha Lau Cheuk-yan, Fanny Ip, Albert Cheung	Golden Forest (金式森林) by Aska Cheung One Thing Still Left Undone (還剩一件未做的事) by James Ng	19.6	Family, Modern	
17 Nov- 19 Dec	Meet Yourself 去有风的地方	23	Ding Ziguang (director); Wang Xiongcheng, Shui Qianmo (screenwriters); Crystal Liu, Li Xian, Hu Bingqing, Tu Songyan, Niu Junfeng, Wu Yanshu, Dong Qing, Ma Meng-wei, Fan Shuai Qi, Zhao Zi Qi, Cui Yi, Pengyuan Shi, Gong Beibi, Janice Wu, Joseph Zeng, Leo Li, Sun Min, Milkan Liu, Yuan Ran, Song Fang Yuan, Annabel Yao, Baby Gong, Ping Hao, Liu Jia, Ai Liya, Mark Ma, Fu Jia, Kun Yang	Why not leave? (不如出走) by Yanji Chan	16.2	Slice of life, Romance, Drama	
22 Dec- 28 Jan (to 2026)	Fated Hearts 一笑随歌	27	Gong Yu, Luo Jun Hui (producers); Qing Wei (writer); Sweet Li, Chen Zheyuan, Xia Meng, Chen Heyi, Hyman Zuo-ye, Qin Tianyu, Xin Kai Li, Zhang Cheng Lang, Sheng Ying Hao, Wang Ziteng, Eddie Cheung	Not in vain (不枉) by Matt Hu Floating in mid-air (半空浮盪) by Or Yu Fei	15.3	Historical period drama, Wuxia	

== Notes ==
- OPM (Other People's Money) 富貴千團; Released overseas on April 29, 2022. Copyright notice: 2021
