= List of TVB dramas in 2026 =

These are the dramas that releases by TVB

This is a list of television serial dramas released by TVB in 2026, including highest-rated television dramas and award ceremonies.

== Top ten drama series in ratings ==
The following is a list of TVB's top serial dramas in 2026 by viewership ratings. The recorded ratings include premiere week, final week, finale episode, and the average overall count of live Hong Kong viewers (in millions).

Highest-rated drama series of 2026
Rank	English title	Chinese title	Average	Peak	Premiere week	Final week	Series finale	HK viewers (millions)
1								
2								
3								
4								
5								
6								
7								
8								
9								
10								

== Awards ==
Category/Organization	TVB Anniversary Awards
Best Drama	
Best Actor	
Best Actress	
Best Supporting Actor	
Best Supporting Actress	
Most Improved Actor	
Most Improved Actress	
Best Theme Song	
Most Popular On-Screen Couple or Partnership	

== First line-up ==
These dramas air in Hong Kong every Sunday to Friday from 8:00 pm to 8:30 pm on Jade.

Broadcast	English title (Chinese title)	Eps.	Cast and crew	Theme song(s)	Avg. rating	Genre	Ref.
(from 2025); 20 Feb 2017– 7 Aug	Come Home Love: Lo and Behold 愛·回家之開心速遞	2868	Sandy Shaw, Law Chun-ngok (producers); Ma Chun-ying, Lee Yi-wah, Yuen Bo-wai (writers); Lau Dan, Pal Sinn, Angela Tong, Koni Lui, Andrew Chan, Andrea So, Veronica Shiu, Joyce Tang, Kalok Chow, Law Lok-lam, Geoffrey Wong, Mark Ma, Ricco Ng, Hoffman Cheng, Mandy Lam, Kim Li	"這個家" (This home) by Chantel Yiu	TBA	Sitcom, supernatural	
10 Aug-	Like Mother, Like Daughter 愛·回家之三代同糖		Marco Law (producer); Ma Jun Jing (editor); Stephanie Che, Jinny Ng, Desta Lee, Terry Li, Gary Chiu, Regina Ho, Duncan How, Leo Kwan, Daniel Chau, Alex Yung, Karen Wu, Venus Lam, Sherman Poon	"代代相愛" (Love Across Generations) by Jinny Ng		Sitcom, Family	

== Second line-up ==
These dramas air in Hong Kong from 8:30 pm to 9:30 pm, Monday to Friday on Jade.

Background shading indicates dramas not produced by TVB.

Broadcast	English title (Chinese title)	Eps.	Cast and crew	Theme song(s)	Avg. rating	Genre	Ref.
(from 2025); 16 Dec- 16 Jan	Homeland Guardian 守诚者	24	Law Wing Cheong, Liu Shun An (directors); Chan Man Keung, Ma Yan, Ma Shuai, Fu Xiao Pu, Su Bing (writers); Jordan Chan, Peter Ho, Simon Yam, Aarif Rahman, Cecilia Han, Joyce Tang, Carmen Tong, Karan Choi, Waise Lee, Stephen Wong Ka-lok, Lynn Dai-Lin Xiong, Loletta Rachel Lee Lai Chun, Christine Ng, Carl Ng, Ai Wai, KK Cheung, Sammy Sum, Kent Tong, Michael Chan, Glen Lee, Debbie Lo, Christopher Sin, Kenneth Lai, Kevin Tong, Mike Sui, Cherry Lee, Chen Wei Meng, Power Chan, Charlene Houghton, Alice Fung, Simon Lo, Parkman Raphael Wong, Keith Ng, Pearl Poon, Luvin Ho, Willie Lau, Philippe Joly	Comrades (同袍) by Alan Tam	20.2	Crime drama, Police Tactical	
19 Jan- 20 Feb	The Unusual Prosecutor 非常检控观	25	Lam Chi Wah (producer); Steffie Lai (writer); Joe Ma, Ricco Ng, Winki Lai, Alice Chan, Hera Chan, Kayan Yau, Angel Chiang, Aska Cheung, Matthew Ho, Li Shing-cheong, Rainbow Ching, Pat Poon, Nicholas Yuen, Joey Leung, Toby Chan, Yuki Law, Kris Lam, William Chak, Ethan King Lam, Man Ngai, Stephen Ho, Albert Cheung, Lily Poon, Axity Chong, Iris Lam, Kaman Kong, Rosanne Lui, KK Cheung, Felix Ng, Helen Ng, Strawberry Yeung, Joey Thye, Tiffany Choi, Niklas Lam, Carman Kwan, Wing Chun Chan, Billy Cheung, Bill Ng, Adrien Yau, Ronny Lay, Shek Sau, Antonio Ng, Willie Lau, Joe Junior, Tsui Wing	There is light in the darkness (黑暗有光) by Aska Cheung Empathy (感同身受) by Kayee Tam Punishing Tears (懲人淚) by Matthew Ho	19.7	Mystery, Fashion Law	
23 Feb- 27 Mar	Pretty Dangerous 臥底嬌娃	25	Dave Fong (producer); Sandy Shaw (story editor); Kelly Cheung, Mark Ma Kwun Tung, Jeannie Chan, Yuki Law, Yumi Chung, Maggie Shiu, Eddie Kwan, Geoffrey Wong, Hugo Wong, Leo Kwan, Oscar Tao, Willie Wai, Nina Li, Albert Cheung, Jason Lau Pau Piao, Claire Yiu, Duncan How, Eden Lau, To Yin Gor, Terry Li, Matthew Ho	Fight (喧嘩) by Kelly Cheung, Jeannie Chan, Yuki Law, Yumi Chung New agent (新紮特工) by Yuki Law Corner dust (角落塵埃) by Yumi Chung	18.7	Comedy, Police Tactical, Modern Drama	
30 Mar- 1 May	Themis 正義女神	25	Chung Shu Kai, Kuen Xiang Lan, Ben Fong, Kwan Man Shum, Xu Guan (producers); Charmaine Sheh, Patrick Tam, Alice Chan, Kalok Chow, Hui Siu Hung, Mark Ma, Joman Chiang, Joey Thye, Telford Wong, Annie Man, Eva Lai, Akina Hong, Li Shing-cheong, Stephen Ho, Sam Tsang, Samantha Lau, Vincent Lam Wai, Fabienne Kwan, Kris Lam, Adrien Yau, Amber Chan, Bambi Lok, Derek Wong, English Tang, Michael Wai, Matthew Chu, Parkman Wong	Late never denied (In English) by Quinn Lui It is not too late (未會遲) by Vivian Koo	22.8	Legal drama	
4 May- 15 May	Case X Decoded 重案解密	12	Tommy Leung, Chan Shu (producers); Choy Ching Shing (director); Gary Tang (writer); Michael Miu, Eliza Sam, Catherine Chau, Rebecca Zhu, Tony Hung, Michael Tao, Wilson Ai Wai Tsui, Eric Lee, Jason Wu, Anjaylia Chan, Kandy Wong, Toby Leung, Lillian Ho, Eddie Wu, Rainbow Ching, Jessica Chan, Hoi Yeung, Bond Chan, Jacquelin Ch'ng, Inez Leong, Osanna Chiu, Elanne Kong, Pinky Cheung, KK Cheung, Sherming Yiu, Mandy Tam, Evergreen Mak Cheung-ching, Ng Siu Hin, Calvin Chan, David Chiang, William Chak, Sophie Ngan, Arnold Kwok, Jeana Ho, Jazz Lam, Oscar Leung, Deon Cheung		21.7	Police Tactical, Investigator, Crime drama, Thriller, Action	
18 May- 12 Jun	The Map Of Truth 香港探秘地圖	20	Simon Wong (producer); Chan Ho Ji, Li Ho (writers); Wayne Lai, Katy Kung, Karl Ting, Carmen Ngai, Danny Hung, Andrew Yuen Man-kit, Strawberry Yeung, Jacquelin Ch'ng, Lisa Ch'ng, Leo Kwan, Chole Nguyen, Frankie Choi	When will you come again? (何日君再來) by Sherman Poon	19.9	Contemporary Fantasy, Horror, Mystery	
15 Jun- 26 Jun	The Airport Diary II 飛常日誌II	10	Andy Chan (producer); Benny Wong (writer); Kenneth Ma, Tony Hung, Samantha Ko, Tiffany Lau, Kalok Chow, Brian Chu, Rosita Kwok, Ricco Ng, Joey Thye, Aska Cheung, Ellyn Ngai, Yumi Chung, Tsui Wing	I found my way by Vic Teo Flying Path (飛常道) by Joey Thye	21.9	Modern, Romantic comedy, Drama	
29 Jun- 31 Jul	Deadly Sins 非份之罪	25	Amy Wong (producer); Yung Sin-ying (writer); Lawrence Ng, Tsui Wing, Alice Chan, Moon Lau, Zoie Tam, Kaman Kong, William Chak, Pal Sinn, Elvina Kong, Angelina Lo, Ankie Beilke, Nicholas Yuen, Bob Cheung, Kirby Lam, Eva Lai, Winki Lai, Joey Thye, Steve Lee, Kayan Yau, Ricco Ng, Brian Chu, Lo Koon Lan, Roxanne Ho, Stitch Yu, Karen Wu, Arthur Sy, Felix Ng, Timothy Cheng, Willie Wai, Stephen Ho, Milkson Fong, Kevin Tong, Frederick Chui, Randal Tsang, Michelle Ip, Vincent Choi, Eric Tang, Jimmy Au	Deadly sins (theme music)	22.6	Mystery, Thriller, Contemporary, Investigation	
3 Aug- 4 Sep	Mrs Revenge 夫妻的博弈	25	Chung Shu-kai, Wong Kwok Fai (producers); Leung Man Wa (writer); Samantha Ko, Kenneth Ma, Ben Wong, Jonathan Cheung, Matthew Ho, Kayan Yau, Rosita Kwok, Yumi Chung, Hera Chan, Nina Li, Natalie Cho, Yvonne Lam, John Chan, Bonnie Wong, Li Shing-cheong, Griselda Yeung, Kelly Fu, Roxanne Ho, Danny Hung, Lucas Yiu, Gordon Ip, Kevin Tong, Eric Tang, Timothy Cheng, Terence Tung, Mina Kwok, Cathy Wong, Sharon Ying, Cecilia So, Terrence Huang, Jim Tang	S.H.E.R.O. by Chantel Yiu, Yumi Chung, Windy Zhan The Beauty of Two Minus One (二缺一的美) by Yumi Chung	21.2	Modern, Comeback Investigator, Fashion	
7 Sep- 9 Oct	Cause Of Death 死有對証	25	Wong Wai Sing (producer); Ma Yan, Shi Long Mai (writers); Mark Ma Kwun Tung, Hera Chan, Willie Wai, Nicholas Yuen, Jinny Ng, Mary Hon, Rachel Chan, Jan Tse, Wong Fei, Carmaney Wong, Alice Wong, John Chan, Yen To Yin Gor, Kevin Tong, Bond Chan, Milkson Fong, Enson Lau, Pinky Cheung	Hint (暗示) by Joey Wong	21.5	Crime drama, Mystery, Forensic	
12 Oct- 6 Nov	This City Never Sleeps 璀璨之城	20	Joe Chan (producer); Raymond Wen, Lau Chi-ling, Lam Suet-gwan (writers); Julian Cheung, Ron Ng, Samantha Ko, Kelly Cheung, Jeannie Chan, Angel Chiang, David Chiang, Elena Kong, Alice Chan, Danny Hung, Tsui Wing, Li Shing-cheong, Hera Chan, Joman Chiang, Carmen Ngai, Daniel Chau, Hugo Wong, Timothy Cheng, Calvin Coy, Sunny Dia, Pat Poon, Alice Wong, Mimi Kung, Jacquelin Ch'ng, Pal Sinn, Joyce Tang, Albert Cheung, Michael Tse, Zoie Tam, Helen Ma, Chan Wing Chun, Rosanne Lui, Amy Fan	Brilliant Steps (踏上燦爛) by Bo Huang & Vic Teo Black Velvet Tide by Janees Wong		Fashion, Family, Business, Rivals	
9 Nov- 11 Dec	War Of Thorns 玫瑰戰爭	25	Chung Shu Kai, Kenne Yam (producers); Lui Koon Nam (writer); Tavia Yeung, Elaine Yiu, Rosina Lam, Kelly Fu, Moses Chan, Kenneth Ma, Ruco Chan, Jonathan Cheung, Yoyo Chen, Celina Harto, Judy Kwong, Moss Wu, Yvette Chan, Ethan King Lam, Pat Poon, Li Shing-cheong, Rainbow Ching	Lost in the Game by Quinn Lui The Greatest Showman (大娛樂家) by Rosina Lam, Elaine Yiu, Kelly Fu		Entertainment industry, Modern	

== Third line-up ==
These dramas air in Hong Kong from 9:30 pm to 10:30 pm (10:00 pm to 11:00 pm from 15 June to 14 August; 5 October onwards), Monday to Friday on Jade. Remark: There will be no episode broadcast on 1 Jan 2026 due to the New Year celebration.

Background shading indicates dramas not produced by TVB.

Broadcast	English title (Chinese title)	Eps.	Cast and crew	Theme song(s)	Avg. rating	Genre	Ref.
(from 2025); 22 Dec- 28 Jan	Fated Hearts 一笑随歌	27	Gong Yu, Luo Jun Hui (producers); Qing Wei (writer); Sweet Li, Chen Zheyuan, Xia Meng, Chen Heyi, Hyman Zuo-ye, Qin Tianyu, Xin Kai Li, Zhang Cheng Lang, Sheng Ying Hao, Wang Ziteng, Eddie Cheung	Not in vain (不枉) by Matt Hu Floating in mid-air (半空浮盪) by Or Yu Fei	15.3	Historical period drama, Wuxia	
29 Jan- 4 Mar	Yummy, Yummy? Yummy! 歡樂茶飯	23	Bai Yun Mo (director); Ji Sang Rou, Ding Lu (screenwriters); Wang Yinglu, Li Yunrui, Chang Long, Jiayi Feng, Sui Jun Bo, Dong Si Yi, Hu Wei, Molly Han Mo	Happy Tea and Meals (歡樂茶飯) by Vic Teo, Kevin Liu	15.4	Historical period drama, Cook, Wuxia, Comedy	
5 Mar- 3 Apr	The Imperial Corner II 機智女法醫2	22	Lou Jian (director); Wang Kuen (producer); Su Xiao Tong, Wang Ziqi, Yaoke Zhao, Tingdong Yang, Wang Yan Xin	No matter how desolate the road is, you are by my side. (路再荒你在旁) by Felix Lam Fulfilling forever (兌現永遠) by Sophie Yip	15.2	Wuxia, Historical period drama	
6 Apr- 6 May	Legend of The Magnate 大生意人	23	Ting Zhang (director); Ma Jun (film producer); Chen Xiao, Sun Qian, Luo Yizhou, Cheng Taishen, Huang Zhizhong, Chun Li, Julia Xiang, Zhu Ya Wen, Liu Peiqi, Zhu Yin, Yongquan Wang, Wu Yue, Wang Zi Xuan, Rosina Lam, Michelle Ke Lan, Liang Guanhua, Cheng Fung, Shen Baoping, Ko Yang, Li Lam, Ling Zhuo, Max Luan, Seng Xu, Huang Chao	To go about one's daily life (過日子) by Raymond Tam There is ample time (來日方長) by Bo Huang	16.7	Dynasty, Historical period drama	
7 May- 12 Jun	How Dare You? 成何體統	25	Chow Jing Leoi (producer); Lau Hoi Bo (director); Wong Huan (writer); Ryan Cheng Lei, Wang Churan, Hu Yi-xuan, Daddi Tang, Louis Fan Siu-wong, Harrison Ho, Ji Xiaofei, Xie Zecheng, Hao Han, Cheng Hong-xin, Baolai Mei, Dong Si Yi, Cheng Jun Hao, Sun Bin, Ma Su, Cui Yi, Una, Zhang Ruihan, Sui Yongliang, Hei Zi, Hu Xiaoting, Terry Chiu	I'm Fine And You? by Gary Chiu If there's wind (若有風) by Sherman Poon	14.8	Historical period drama, Wuxia, Time Travel	
15 Jun- 14 July	Coroner’s Diary 女法醫解密	22	Lee Wai Chu, Tang Wai Yan (directors); Zou Yue (writer); Wang Xiao Hui (producer); Landy Li, Ao Rui Peng, Yu Cheng En, Shen Yujie, Chen Tian Yu, Otto Chan, Tien Niu, Kim Zhang, Heidi Wong, Ren Zhong	Traveling the world (遊歷世間) by Jackie Li	14.8	Historical period drama, Wuxia, Mystery	
15 July- 24 July	Mobius 不眠日	8	Liu Zhang Mu (director); Bi Qiang (screenwriter); Wang Xiao Yan (producer); Bai Jingting, Song Yang, Liu Yi Jun, Janice Man, Chutimon Chuengcharoensukying, Baby Zhang, Gladys Li, Ricky Chan, KK Cheung, Keith Ng, Cheung Ka-nin, Carlos Koo, Eddie Wu, Qian Yi, Rong Zishan, Raymond Chiu, Ho Chun-hin, Kelvin Lee	Mobius (theme music)	13.6	Crime drama, Mystery, Sci-fi, Time travel, Detective, Supernatural, Action, Thriller	
27 July- 2 Sep	The Epoch of Miyu 翻身蜜語	28	Wang Ying (director); Wang Xiao Hui, Yang Bei (producers); Wallace Chung, Zhu Zhu, Vivien Li Meng, Jing Chao, Joe Xu, Cristy Guo, Nine Ko, Hai Lu, Ren Bin, Na Jia Wei, Yi Zheng Geng, Tan Xiaofan, Relke Wenqing, Ge Xu, Elton Tang Haoyuan, Li Honglei	Remember who I am (記住我是誰) by Miranda Lee	18.1	Romance, Life, Business	
3 Sep- 9 Oct	Blossoms of Power 百花杀	27	Zhong Qing, Guo Feng (directors); Jin Huang (writer); Wang Juan, Fang Fang (producers); Zoey Meng Ziyi, He Yu, Snow Kong, Chen Heyi, Lin Ziye, Jeremy Tsui, Peter Ho, Lai Weiming, Cao Yangmingzhu, Jiang Yixuan, Yumiko Cheng, Fan Shuaiqi, Vengo Gao Wei Guang, Mark John Du Yi Heng	Bustling Mortal World (紅塵慌慌) in Mandarin original song by Charlie Zhou Shen Staying on a rainy day (停留在雨天) by Yuni Hui	15.3	Historical period drama, Romance	
12 Oct- 4 Dec	Pursuit of Jade 逐玉	40	Zeng Qing-jie (director); Zou Yue, Jin Zi, Zeng Zhen (writers); Lv Yan Ting, Fu Tuo, Ren Chang Qing, Wang Ying Yu (producers); Vivian Tian, Snow Kong, Zhang Linghe, Deng Kai Shang, Yan Kuan, Nine Gao, He Changxi	World of Ice and Snow (冰天雪地) by Vic Teo		Historical period drama, Romance	
