= Krysella Wong =

Hong Kong actress (born 1998)

- 黃婧靈
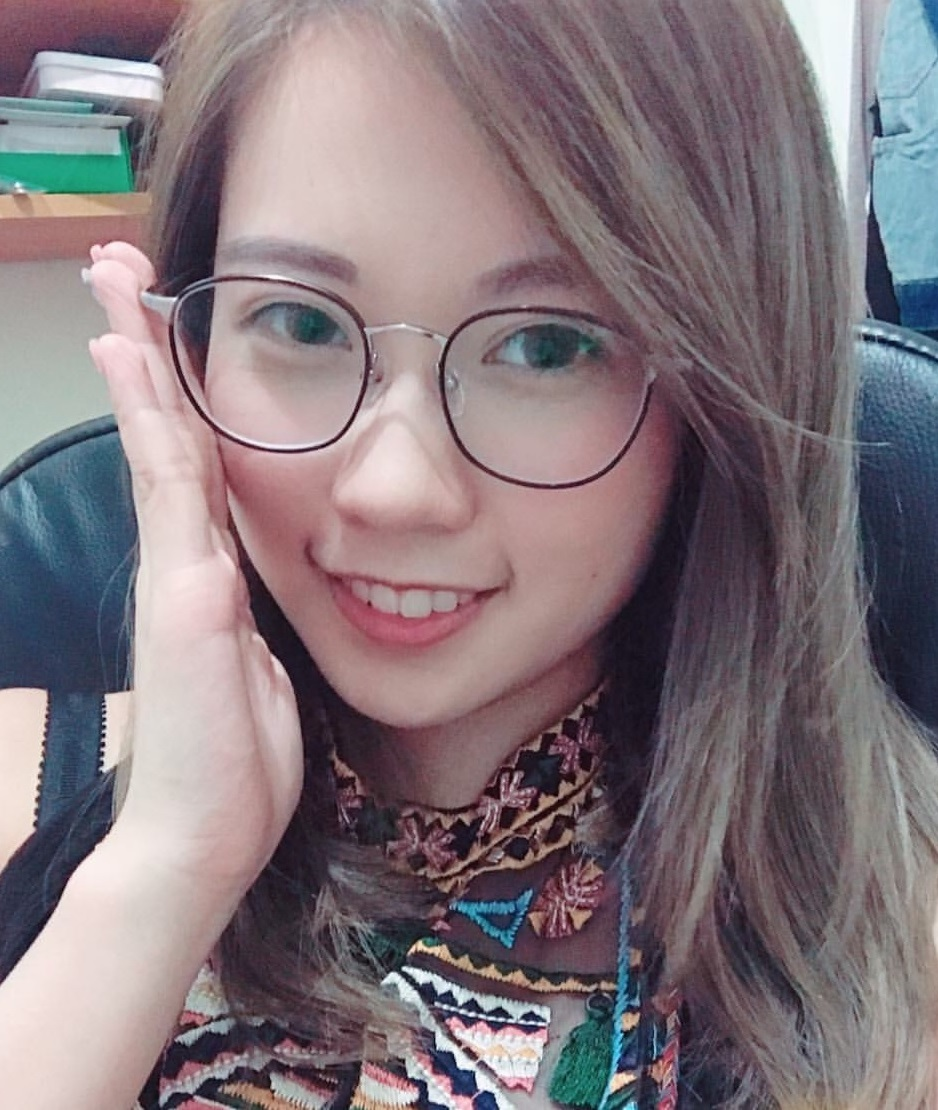
- Born: Krysella Wong Hoi Yee (黃凱儀)
- Other name: Krysella Wong Ching Ling
- Occupations: host, actress and key opinion leader
- Years active: 2016–present
- Notable work: Young And Restless; Have A Big Laugh; Elderly Vs Youngster
- Awards: "TVB Awards Presentation Most Improved Female Artist" (2021-2022)

Krysella Wong Ching Ling (Chinese: 黃婧靈), originally known as Krysella Wong Hoi Yee (Chinese: 黃凱儀), is Hong Kong female host, actress and key opinion leader.

== Biography ==
Wong graduated from Aldrich Bay Government Primary School and Shau Kei Wan Government Secondary School in 2010 and 2016 respectively, she then studied the associate degree in business administration at City University College of Hong Kong. In 2016, she was nicknamed "Bear Girl" by netizens for filming a short film with YouTuber "FHProductionHK" and playing one of the "bear head heroine", and she gradually became known to the public.

In December 2019, Wong accompanied Louisa Mak and Danny Hung to Nagoya City to film the big big channel travel program "Young People Go Traveling". Inspired by Maggie Mak's words, she hopes to return to school and complete university courses and obtain a degree in two years. She also wants to practice ice skating skills again to add value to herself.

According to her own account during the filming of Young And Restless (#後生仔傾吓偈), her foreign name "Krysella" might be difficult to remember, so people around her changed her nickname to "Bobo" (波波), and she herself didn't know the real reason. However, she accepted a media interview before and after the episode aired, revealing that she got the nickname "Bobo" "because of her outstanding figure". She accepted it happily and it became a common nickname for the media.

In April 2021, Krysella Wong Ching Ling (黃婧靈) signed a contract as a TVB Manager Contract artist, and in mid-August of the same year, she changed her real name "Krysella Wong Hoi Yee"(黃凱儀) to her current stage name. In the same year, Wong participated in several wireless television programs, including Have A Big Laugh (開心大綜藝) and Elderly Vs Youngster (代溝關注組), and was nominated for the "Most Improved Female Artist" for the first time at the "TVB Awards Presentation 2021". In March 2022, Wong hosted the TVB sex education program Give Him Anoral (internet name) / Let's Talk About Sex (name in electronic programme guide, 冇人性教育) and received attention for her outstanding performance. At the end of the same year, she was nominated for the "Most Improved Female Artist" again at the "TVB Awards Presentation Ceremony 2022".

== Filmography ==
=== Television series ===
Year	Title	Role	Notes
2018	My Boss Is Inhuman	Japanese Girl (日本妹)	Ep 13
2020	Life After Death	Fong Shu-man (方書文)	Main role (youngster)
2021	Sinister Beings	Journalist	Ep 10, 15, 20
