= Archie Sin =

Hong Kong singer and actor

- 冼靖峰
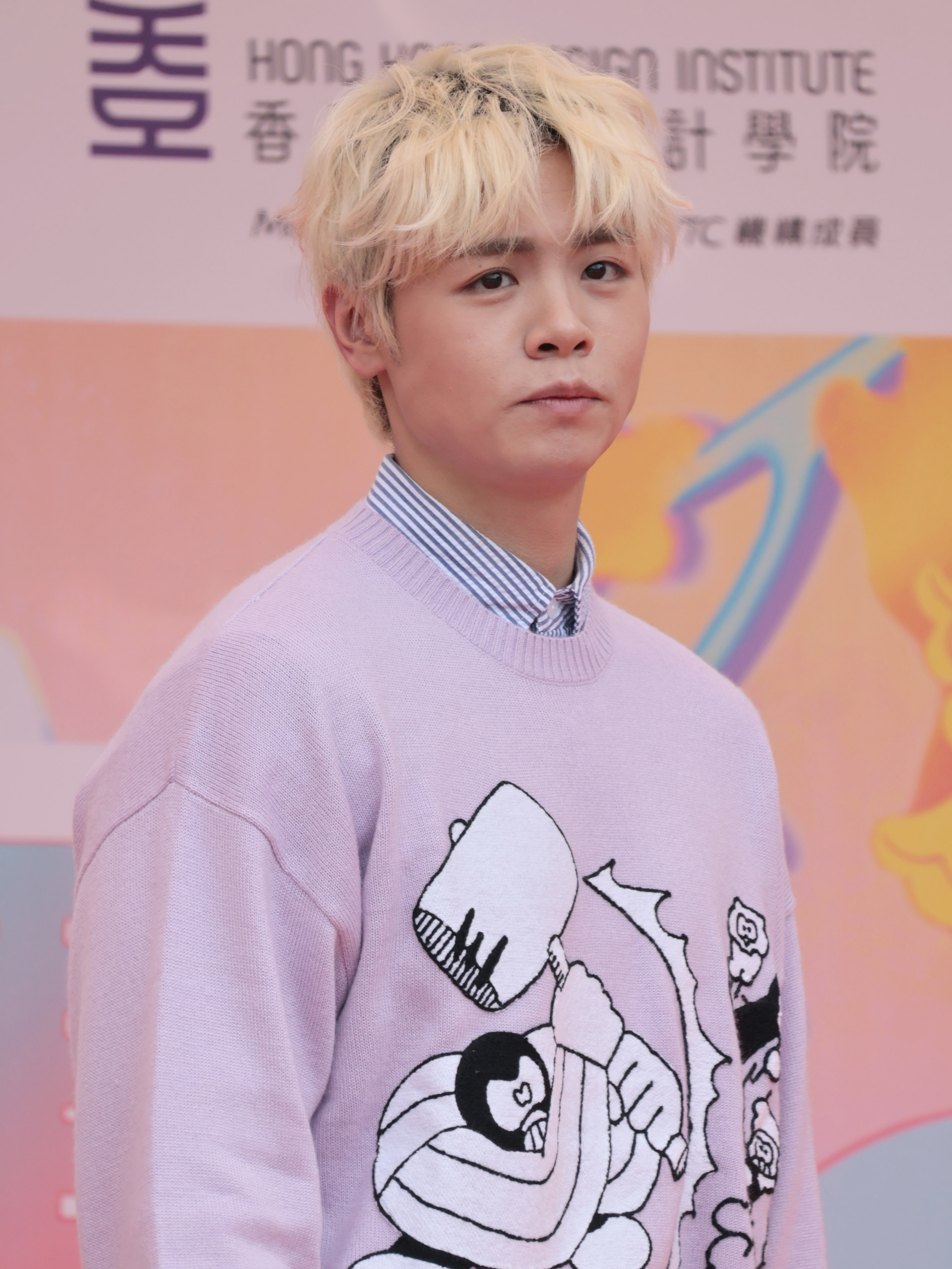
- Sin in 2024
- Born: May 15, 1998 (age 28); Hong Kong
- Education: University of Hong Kong
- Occupations: Singer; actor
- Years active: 2021–present
- Agent: TVB
- Musical career
- Origin: Hong Kong
- Genres: Cantopop; Mandopop
- Instrument: Vocals
- Labels: TVB Music Group; All About Music

Chinese name
- Traditional Chinese: 冼靖峰
- Simplified Chinese: 冼靖峰
Transcriptions
Standard Mandarin
- Hanyu Pinyin: Xiǎn Jìng-fēng
Yue: Cantonese
- Jyutping: Sin^{2} Zing^{6}-fung^{1}
- Website: Official Instagram

Archie Sin Ching-fung (Note: Chinese: 冼靖峰; Jyutping: Sin^{2} Zing^{6}-fung^{1}) (born 15 May 1998) is a Hong Kong Cantopop singer and actor. He gained recognition on TVB's Stars Academy (2021), finishing fourth, and debuted in 2022 with the single "The Book of Fortune" (一個人的幸運). He has since released several solo singles, appeared in television series including Forever Young at Heart (2021–2022) and Broken Trust (2024), and in 2023 debuted as a member of the boy group Loong 9 after competing on Asia Super Young.

== Career ==
=== 1998–present: Early life and career beginnings ===
Archie Sin was born on 15 May 1998 in Hong Kong, the elder of two sons. He studied piano for more than ten years and developed an interest in singing during his secondary school years at La Salle College. Sin won several school singing awards and cited Hins Cheung as his musical idol. He wanted to pursue a singing career without attending university; his parents rejected his aspiration as they preferred him to follow an academic path. Sin graduated from the University of Hong Kong with a bachelor's degree in Business Administration in 2020. While performing with a college band, he competed in ViuTV's singing competition show King Maker II (2019) and made it to the Top 60. He later continued his vocal training and was encouraged by a friend to audition for TVB's singing competition Stars Academy (2021). An outstanding performance of his during the show was Eason Chan's "The Night No Longer Comes" (黑夜不再來, 2000) for which Eric Kwok praised Sin for his ability in making the song "his own." He also scored the highest by the judges in the first round of the finale with Stefanie Sun's "What I Miss" (我懷念的, 2007), ultimately finishing fourth place overall.

Stars Academy season 1 performances and results
Round	Song choice	Original artist	Notes	Result	Ref.
Introduction	"Snowflakes" (飛花)	Hacken Lee	performed with fellow contestants Felix Lam	N/A	
Round 1	"Beneath the Cherry Blossom Tree" (櫻花樹下)	Hins Cheung		Advanced	
Top 14	"Song of Happiness" (幸福之歌)	Supper Moment		Advanced	
Top 13	"Colour of Your Eyes" (眼色)	Yoga Lin	with fellow contestants Aska Cheung	Advanced	
Top 13	"Puzzle" (拼圖)	Original song	with fellow contestants Aska Cheung, Chantel Yiu, Rock Ho, Sherman Poon, Hugo Wong and Windy Zhan	Advanced	
Top 12	"Bicycle" (單車)	Eason Chan	with fellow contestants Aska Cheung, Chantel Yiu, Rock Ho, Sherman Poon	Advanced	
Top 10	"The Night No Longer Comes" (黑夜不再來)	Eason Chan		Advanced	
Top 9	"Rustle of Rain" (沙沙的雨)	David Lui	duet with Jay Fung	Advanced	
Top 7	"Late Person" (昨遲人)	Andy Hui		Advanced	
Top 6	"How Could I Not Regret Having Let You Go" (怎麼捨得你)	Jacky Cheung	duet with fellow contestant Rock Ho	Advanced	
Finale	"What I Miss" (我懷念的)	Stefanie Sun		4th place	

He quit his banking job and signed a management contract with TVB, becoming an artist under All About Music. In January 2022, he released his debut single "The Book of Fortune" (一個人的幸運). Since Stars Academy, Sin has been involved in songwriting and composition, including contributions to the Forever Young at Heart (2021–2022) soundtrack. He also made his acting debut in the series, portraying a secondary school student who experiences monster parenting. Sin has released several solo singles, including "Bug Fix" (2023), "No Offense" (無意冒犯) (2024), and "Courage" (勇氣) (2024). In 2023, he competed in Asia Super Young, becoming one of the finalists and debuting in the boy group Loong 9.

== Filmography ==
=== Television series ===
Year	Title	Role	Network	Notes	Ref.
2021	Stars Academy	Himself	TVB	Singing competition	
2021	Starry Starry Academy	Himself	TVB	Stars Academy Making-of Footage	
2021	First Live on Stage	Himself	TVB	Stars Academy Concert	
2021	Forever Young at Heart	Archie Yip Ar-chee	TVB	Youth drama	
2023	Got a Crush on You (恋恋红尘)	Yao Zhou			
2023	Asia Super Young	Himself	TVB	Singing survival show	
2024	Broken Trust (神耆小子)	Chiu Yat-ming	TVB	Supporting role	
2025	Infinity and Beyond S4 (聲生不息·大灣區)	Himself	Mango TV, Hunan Television, TVB	Singing variety show	

== Awards and nominations ==
- Only major music awards are included per List of Hong Kong music awards. Most music nominations are excluded due to the lack of reliable sources.

Year	Award	Category	Nominated work	Results	Ref.
2022	Asian Academy Creative Awards	Best Theme Song Or Title Theme	"Forever Young at Heart" by Archie Sin & Rock Ho	Won	
2023	56th TVB Anniversary Awards	Most Promising Newcomers	Himself	Won	
2024	Metro Radio Music Awards	Hit Leaping Male Singer (bronze)		Won	
