= Camera (2014 film) =

2014 Hong Kong-Singaporean film by James Leong

- Film poster
- Directed by: James Leong
- Written by: James Leong; Ben Slater
- Starring: Sean Li; Venus Wong; Calvin Poon
- Cinematography: Basil Mironer
- Edited by: James Leong
- Music by: Shao Yanpeng
- Production company: Lianain Films
- Release date: 19 July 2014 (BiFan)
- Running time: 96 minutes
- Countries: Hong Kong; Singapore
- Language: Cantonese
- Budget: $1 million

Camera is a 2014 science fiction thriller directed by James Leong and co-written by Ben Slater and Leong. A Hong Kong-Singaporean co-production, it stars Sean Li as a surveillance expert who falls in love with his newest target, played by Venus Wong. It premiered at the 2014 Bucheon International Fantastic Film Festival. It is Leong's first narrative film.

== Plot ==
In near-future Hong Kong, Ming receives a cybernetic eye to replace his biological eye, which went blind in his childhood. He uses this replacement to record everything he sees. On his latest surveillance job, he falls in love with the subject, a woman named Clare.

== Cast ==
- Sean Li as Ming
- Venus Wong as Clare
- Calvin Poon as Dr. Chan

Po-Chih Leong, director James Leong's father, appears in a cameo as Ming's father.

== Production ==
Prior to production, Leong received funding from the Network of Asian Fantastic Films in the form of the Puchon award. Shooting took place during January and February 2012 in Hong Kong.

== Release ==
Camera premiered at the Bucheon International Fantastic Film Festival on 19 July 2014.

== Reception ==
Richard Kuipers of Variety wrote that the film fails to live up to its premise and does not expand enough on Hong Kong's futuristic timeline, though he said it "never becomes dull". Bérénice Reynaud of Senses of Cinema criticized the Variety review, saying that it missed out on how the film addresses surveillance issues in modern Hong Kong. Clarence Tsui of The Hollywood Reporter wrote, "Beauty thrives but also distracts the director from his aspirations of fusing fiction with social commentary." James March of Twitch Film wrote that the film "showcases the director's strong visual sensibility", but the dull screenplay causes it to fail to live up to its "intriguing premise".
