= Sammy's Children's Day =

2026 Chinese television series

- Official poster

Chinese name
- Traditional Chinese: 初三的六一兒童節
- Simplified Chinese: 初三的六一儿童节
Transcriptions
Standard Mandarin
- Hanyu Pinyin: chū sān de liù yī ér tóng jié
Yue: Cantonese
- Jyutping: co1 saam1 dik1 luk6 jat1 ji4 tung4 zit3
- Genre: Drama; Romance; Boys' love
- Starring: He Changxi; He Yanzhao
- Country of origin: Hong Kong
- Original language: Cantonese
- No. of seasons: 1
- No. of episodes: 9

Production
- Running time: 43–58 minutes

Original release
- Release: March 13 – May 1, 2026

Sammy's Children's Day (traditional Chinese: 初三的六一兒童節; simplified Chinese: 初三的六一儿童节) is a Hong Kong Chinese romantic drama television series with a boys' love (BL) theme, starring He Changxi and He Yanchao. The drama is based on a novel of the same name. The series premiered in March 2026 and was made available for streaming on Viki and GagaOOLala.

== Synopsis ==
Set in Kowloon Walled City during the 1980s, amidst rampant triad activity and police corruption, He Chusan dreams of studying and escaping the chaos. His plans are changed when Xia Liuyi, a triad deputy leader, drags him into a criminal scheme. As conspiracies unfold and power struggles intensify, the two men evolve from reluctant allies into partners seeking revenge. He Chusan, a calculating yet loyal financial strategist, and Xia Liuyi, a fierce but unexpectedly tender enforcer, fight side by side in a lawless city where love becomes the most dangerous gamble.

== Cast ==
=== Main ===
- He Changxi as He Chusan / Sam
- He Yanchao as Xia Liuyi

=== Supporting ===
- Matthew Han as Detective Xie Jiahua / Jay
- Zhang Mingbo as Lu Guangming
- Huang Shichao as Qing Long
- Meiqing Cao as Cui Dong Dong
- Chu Xiao Long as Father He (Chusan's father)
- Shengpei Liao as Xiaoma

== Soundtrack ==
The original soundtrack (OST) for Sammy's Children's Day (《初三的六一儿童节》) was released in 2026 and features performances by the lead actors, including He Yanzhao and He Changxi.

Sammy's Children's Day OST
No.	Title	Artist	Length
1.	"执迷 (Obsession)" (Opening theme)	He Yanzhao	3:27
2.	"你會回來嗎 (Will You Come Back?)" (Theme song)	He Yanzhao, He Changxi	2:56
3.	"請相信 (Please Believe)" (Ending theme)	He Yanzhao, He Changxi	2:56
4.	"是你愛了我 (It Was You Who Loved Me)" (Romantic theme)	He Changxi	3:55
5.	"追沙 (Chasing the Sand)" (Insert song)	Matthew Han, Zhang Mingbo	3:48
6.	"歧 (Divergence)" (Insert song)	Matthew Han, Zhang Mingbo	3:48

== Production ==
The series was announced in 2025 and officially released in March 2026. It consists of 9 episodes of approximately 45 minutes each. Sportskeeda highlighted the release schedule and storyline, while Zhihu discussed the historical setting and the mix of action and romance.

== Broadcast ==
Sammy's Children's Day premiered on 13 March 2026, with weekly episodes released on Fridays. The series is available internationally on Viki and GagaOOLala.

== Reception ==
The series attracted international media attention before and after its release. Sportskeeda described it as a Chinese BL drama set against a backdrop of crime and corruption, while MyDramaList recorded positive user ratings. On Viki, Sammy's Children's Day received a score of 9.4 out of 10 based on 246 user reviews.

== Marketing ==
In May 2026, lead actors He Changxi and He Yanzhao attended the 2026 Cannes Film Festival together in connection with Sammy's Children's Day. Their appearance attracted attention from international entertainment and fashion media, with some outlets describing the moment as a milestone for Chinese BL productions.

== Accolades ==
=== Listicles ===
Year-end lists for Sammy's Children's Day
Critic/Publication	List	Rank	Ref.
GQ India	7 Best C-dramas of 2026	Included	
