= He Yanchao =

Chinese actor (born 2000)

He Yanzhao
- 何衍朝
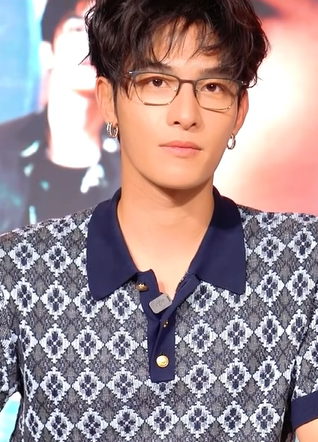
- He Yanchao in 2026
- Born: 27 April 2000 (age 26); Huizhou, Guangdong, China
- Other name: Heihei (黑黑)
- Education: Xinghai Conservatory of Music
- Occupations: Actor; musician
- Years active: 2020–present
- Height: 1.79 m (5 ft 10 in)

He Yanzhao (simplified Chinese: 何衍朝, pinyin: Hé Yǎnzhāo; born 27 April 2000), also known as Heihei, is a Chinese actor and musician. He made his acting debut in 2020 on the WeTV series Cross Fire. In 2023, he appeared on the WeTV series Jin Secretary and the MangoTV series Dear Passenger. In 2025, he starred in the dramas Fei Hu Cheng Feng and Gentle Wind. In 2026, he starred in the Viki and GagaOOLala series Sammy's Children's Day.

== Career ==
He Yanzhao was born on 27 April 2000 in Huizhou, Guangdong province. He graduated from the Xinghai Conservatory of Music, where he studied music and became proficient in singing and violin. He started acting in 2020 with a role in the series Cross Fire (穿越火线) on WeTV. That same year, he also appeared in the series Classmates, Don't Be Noisy (同学别闹).

In 2023, he played Ling Feng in the series Jin Secretary (进击的金秘书).

In 2024, he appeared as Xiao Ma in the second season of Dear Passenger (亲爱的乘客，你好第二季) and as Ai Ke Si in the miniseries Playing House (对手过家家).

In 2025, he starred in the dramas Fei Hu Cheng Feng (飞虎乘风) as Lin Feng, and Gentle Wind (夏夜晚风) as Zhou Ze Yu. The same year, he appeared in the film Professor Pingshi (坪石先生) as Huang Jiajiao.

In March 2026, he played Xia Liu Yi in the BL drama Sammy's Children's Day (初三的六一兒童節), opposite He Changxi. The series, based on a romance novel that accumulated over 100 million online views, was released internationally on Viki and GagaOOLala.

In May 2026, He Yanzhao attended the 2026 Cannes Film Festival alongside actor He Changxi in connection with the drama Sammy's Children's Day.

== Filmography ==
=== Film ===
Year	Title	Role
2025	Professor Pingshi (坪石先生)	Huang Jiajiao

=== Television ===
Year	Title	Role	Platform	Notes
2020	Cross Fire (穿越火线)	Zhou Ming Zhe	WeTV	Supporting role
2020	Classmates, Don't Be Noisy (同学别闹)			
2023	Jin Secretary (进击的金秘书)	Ling Feng	WeTV	Supporting role
2024	Dear Passenger Season 2 (亲爱的乘客，你好第二季)	Xiao Ma	MangoTV	Supporting role
2024	Playing House (对手过家家)	Ai Ke Si		Miniseries
2025	Fei Hu Cheng Feng (飞虎乘风)	Lin Feng	Bilibili, Douyin	Main role
2025	Gentle Wind (夏夜晚风)	Zhou Ze Yu		Main role
2026	Sammy's Children's Day (初三的六一兒童節)	Xia Liu Yi	Viki, GagaOOLala	Main role

== Discography ==
=== Extended plays ===
- Sammy's Children's Day OST (《初三的六一儿童节》影视原声带) (2026)

=== Soundtrack appearances ===
Year	Title	Album	Notes	Ref.
2026	"你會回來嗎" (Will You Come Back?) (with He Changxi)	Sammy's Children's Day OST (《初三的六一儿童节》影视原声带)	Main theme	
2026	"請相信" (Please Believe) (with He Changxi)	Sammy's Children's Day OST (《初三的六一儿童节》影视原声带)	Ending theme	
2026	"执迷" (Obsession)	Sammy's Children's Day OST (《初三的六一儿童节》影视原声带)	Opening theme	

== Concerts ==
Date	City	Country/Region	Venue	Ref.
July 24, 2026	Hong Kong	Hong Kong, China	MacPherson Stadium	
July 26, 2026	Hong Kong	Hong Kong, China	MacPherson Stadium	
