= The Fading Gold =

2025 Hong Kong television series

- Also known as: 金式森林
- Genre: Family saga; Romance; Revenge
- Written by: Mak Sai-lung; Cheng Shing-mo
- Directed by: Tam Sui-ming; Chan Ho-yee; Lai Tsz-chai; Cheung Ka-nang; Hui Shui-ping
- Starring: Roger Kwok; Hera Chan; Him Law; Mimi Kung
- Opening theme: "Golden Forest (金式森林)" by Aska Cheung
- Country of origin: Hong Kong
- Original language: Cantonese
- No. of episodes: 25

Production
- Producer: Lam Chi-wah
- Production locations: Hong Kong; Qingyuan
- Running time: 43 minutes
- Production companies: TVB; Tencent Video

Original release
- Network: TVB Jade; myTV Super; Tencent Video
- Release: 13 October – 14 November 2025

The Fading Gold (Chinese: 金式森林; lit. 'Golden Forest') is a Hong Kong television drama series produced by TVB in collaboration with the mainland Chinese streaming platform Tencent Video. Produced by Lam Chi-wah, with script supervision by Mak Sai-lung and Cheng Shing-mo, the 25-episode series features an ensemble cast led by Roger Kwok, Hera Chan, Him Law, and Mimi Kung. The drama premiered on Tencent Video on 17 September 2025, followed by its debut on TVB Jade on 13 October 2025. The narrative centers on a wealthy family embroiled in an inheritance dispute following the marriage of an aging tycoon to a younger jewelry designer, exploring themes of power struggles, succession, and age-gap relationships. The series received critical praise for its cast performances and earned multiple nominations at the 58th TVB Anniversary Awards, where Him Law won the fan-voted My Favorite Actor in a Leading Role award for the North America region.

== Cast and characters ==
- Roger Kwok as Fong Yeung-tin, a jewelry tycoon whose marriage to Lam Ching, 27 years his junior, leads to a legal inheritance dispute with his children. Kwok stated that the age gap between himself and Hera Chan required a "nuanced performance" to convey the depth of their bond. Kwok co-developed the character's death scene—a sequence in which he crawls through the streets following a car accident—to emphasize the character's willpower to reach his wife one last time.
- Hera Chan as Lam Ching, a jewelry designer who marries Yeung-tin. Chan described the character's arc as a transformation from a vulnerable "white rabbit" into a "black widow." She characterized the onscreen relationship as a "soulful connection" and credited Kwok's acting mentorship for her performance, noting a pivotal scene where her immersion in the role led to an improvised emotional breakdown.
- Him Law as Ko Sham, a highly articulate former lawyer and the head of a multi-family office. To convey the character's confidence and "mysterious aura," Law adopted tinted glasses, restrained mannerisms, and a measured speech pattern. At Law's suggestion, the character's arc includes an implied, restrained romantic interest in Lam Ching to add subtle emotional depth.
- Matthew Ho as Fong Hok-lai, the eldest son of the Fong family. He is depicted as an ambitious but hot-tempered scion prone to professional and personal blunders.
- Andrew Chan as Fong Hok-kan, the second son of the Fong family. Because family tradition limits succession to the eldest son, he is portrayed as an opportunist who frequently shifts allegiances to suit the situation.
- Joey Law as Fong Hok-yin, the third son of the Fong family. He is estranged from his father and lacks interest in the family business.
- Hilary Chong as Fong Tsz-yan, the youngest daughter of the Fong family, characterized as the household's mild-mannered "mascot." Producer Lam Chi-wah noted that as a first-time actress, Chong was cast due to the similarities between her personality and the character.
- Regina Ho as Kwong Sin-chuen, the eldest daughter-in-law of the Fong family and a snobbish social climber. Ho noted the challenge of portraying the character's jealousy and verbal sparring convincingly.
- Yvette Chan as Tam Ka-yan, the second daughter-in-law of the Fong family. Similar to Sin-chuen, she is portrayed as snobbish and frequently instigates household conflicts.
- Mimi Kung as Cheung Wun-chau, a widow and Yeung-tin's sister-in-law. Kung focused on the character's "aura" and restrained authority, adopting specific mannerisms and relying on the reactions of other characters to establish her presence.
- Helena Law as Fong Luk-siu-kwan, Yeung-tin's mother. Due to Law's advanced age, her scenes were prioritized during production.
- Kaman Kong as Fong Tsz-kwan, Wun-chau's daughter and a troublesome socialite known for causing mischief.
- Rosita Kwok as Ko Ching, Ko Sham's younger sister and a law student who works at her brother's office.
- Tsui Wing as Kwok Wai-leung (Darren), a shareholder and business rival of Yeung-tin. The character's appearance features colorful custom-made suits and tailored grooming intended to convey a refined yet antagonistic image.
- Lee Shing-cheong as Tung Yau-wai, the brother of Yeung-tin's late wife and a calculating uncle to the Fong children.
- Kevin Tong as Lam Yiu, Lam Ching's elder brother. Tong stated that he intentionally portrayed the character's early deceptive behavior to provide a contrast with his later development.

== Plot ==
Fong Yeung-tin, chairman of the Fong International conglomerate, discovers counterfeit products within the Chung Tak Jewellery subsidiary during the company's 80th-anniversary celebration. While investigating the matter with Lam Ching, the pair are involved in a car accident. Yeung-tin falls into a coma, triggering a financial crisis within the firm. Upon regaining consciousness, he stabilizes the company through strategic share buybacks.

Yeung-tin's eldest sons, Hok-lai and Hok-kan, compete for control of the family fortune, while the estranged third son, Hok-yin, remains uninvolved in their schemes. Yeung-tin appoints Ko Sham, a former lawyer, as his strategist to manage a family trust intended to limit his children's influence.

Tensions rise when Yeung-tin marries Ching, whose family was previously ruined by Hok-kan's actions. Suspecting Ching of being a gold-digger, the children initiate legal proceedings to dismantle the trust while maneuvering internally to undermine both her and Sham, occasionally collaborating with rivals Kwong Wai-leung and Tung Yau-wai. Although the lawsuit is eventually withdrawn, Yeung-tin grows suspicious of a mole within the family as his health declines due to a brain tumor.

Following Yeung-tin's death, a legal battle ensues over competing wills and the estate. Ching and Sham work to identify the mole, eventually exposing Wun-chau as the orchestrator of the family's internal strife, motivated by past tragedies. Following Wun-chau's downfall, the inheritance dispute is settled, and Ching ultimately leaves the family.

== Production and themes ==
The series was produced by Lam Chi-wah and directed by a rotating team, with script supervision by Mak Sai-lung and Cheng Shing-mo. Principal photography took place from May to September 2024, primarily in Hong Kong and Qingyuan.

The narrative centers on family power struggles and an age-gap relationship. To balance audience acceptance with the depiction of the romance, Lam directed that no kissing scenes be filmed between Roger Kwok and Hera Chan. Chan explained that the series' literal Chinese title, Golden Forest, symbolizes her character's "white rabbit" journey into a dangerous environment where, despite being surrounded by "predators," she remains driven by her love for the male lead.

The series incorporates contemporary financial and social themes, specifically the multi-family office concept. Lam stated that the production team conducted approximately one year of research to ensure an authentic portrayal of the sector. The drama additionally attracted public attention for its "socialite training class" storyline, which prompted media speculation regarding potential real-life inspirations.

To establish the series' multi-decade family dynamics, Kwok organized private gatherings with the younger cast members prior to filming. The initiative aimed to bridge generational gaps and ease the intimidation younger actors often feel when working alongside their senior counterparts.

== Music ==
Track Listing
No.	Title	Lyrics	Music	Artist(s)	Length
1.	"Golden Forest (金式森林)"	Casey Tse Man-nga	Alex Lau Yik-sing	Aska Cheung	3:36
2.	"One Thing Still Left Undone (還剩一件未做的事)"	Casey Tse Man-nga	Casey Tse Man-nga	James Ng	3:53

"One Thing Still Left Undone," performed by James Ng, serves as a thematic backdrop to the relationship between Fong Yeung-tin and Lam Ching, playing during their shared scenes. Hera Chan also released a short video featuring a cover of the song from her character's perspective.

== Ratings and reception ==
In Hong Kong, the series became the highest-rated drama in its time slot that year, with its finale week peaking at 1.27 million viewers. It accumulated over 30 million views across social media platforms. The series ranked among the top 10 on Yahoo's 2025 list of "Most Searched Local TV Dramas" and placed fourth on DailyView's 2025 TVB popularity list, which measured "internet heat" based on online engagement across more than 20,000 websites and channels in Hong Kong and Macau. In mainland China, the series generated over 750 million social media impressions and topped the streaming charts in its genre category for 16 consecutive days. The cast was generally praised for their performances.

Week	Episodes	Airing dates	Ratings (Note: According to Hong Kong's TV rating system, each rating point represents approximately 64,670 viewers.)		Ref.
Week	Episodes	Airing dates	Cross-platform peak ratings	Viewership	Ref.
1	1 – 5	13–17 October 2025	18.3 points	1.18 million	
2	6 – 10	20–24 October 2025	18.7 points	1.21 million	
3	11 – 15	27–31 October 2025	18.1 points	1.17 million	
4	16 – 20	3–7 November 2025	19.3 points	1.25 million	
5	21 – 25	10–14 November 2025	19.6 points	1.27 million	

== Release ==
The series premiered on Tencent Video on 17 September 2025, and on TVB Jade and myTV Super on 13 October 2025.

== Awards and nominations ==
Year	Award	Category	Nominated work	Results	Ref.
2025	58th TVB Anniversary Awards	Best Television Series	The Fading Gold	Nominated	
2025	58th TVB Anniversary Awards	Best Actor	Him Law	Nominated	
2025	58th TVB Anniversary Awards	Best Actress	Hera Chan	Nominated	
2025	58th TVB Anniversary Awards	My Favorite Television Series (Greater Bay Area)	The Fading Gold	Nominated	
2025	58th TVB Anniversary Awards	My Favorite Actor in a Leading Role (Greater Bay Area)	Him Law	Nominated	
2025	58th TVB Anniversary Awards	Best Television Theme song	"One Thing Still Left Undone" (by James Ng)	Nominated	
2025	58th TVB Anniversary Awards	My Favorite Actor in a Leading Role (North America)	Him Law	Won	
