= Lucky Boy (2017 film) =

2017 film

- Theatrical release poster
- Directed by: Boris Boo
- Written by: Boris Boo; Lim Teck; Danny Yeo
- Produced by: Lim Teck; Melvin Ang; Boi Kwong; Faith Mak; Louis Chew; Hoo Wee Tay; Jack Neo
- Starring: Wang Weiliang; Venus Wong; Chew Chor Meng; Chen Xiuhuan
- Cinematography: Amandi Wong; Lincoln Lin
- Edited by: Yim Mun Chong
- Music by: Eric Wong
- Production companies: Clover Films mm2 Entertainment; J Team Productions
- Distributed by: Golden Village Pictures; Clover Films mm2 Entertainment
- Release date: May 18, 2017
- Running time: 106 minutes
- Country: Singapore
- Language: Mandarin
- Budget: S$2.5 million
- Box office: S$450,000

Lucky Boy (Chinese: 天公仔; pinyin: Tiān Gōngzǎi) is a 2017 comedy film directed by Boris Boo, and starring Wang Weiliang, Venus Wong, Chew Chor Meng and Chen Xiuhuan as the main cast.

== Plot ==
Lin Yu (Wang Weiliang) is a boy who is constantly surrounded by misfortune and is always one step behind others. Since primary school, he has a crush on Zhang Qingqing (Venus Wong), and continues to pin for her throughout his life. Will Lin Yu, the destined "unlucky" boy, be able to change his fate?

== Cast ==
- Wang Weiliang as Lin Yu
- Venus Wong as Zhang Qingqing, Lin Yu's love interest
- Chew Chor Meng as Lin Chong, Lin Yu's father
- Chen Xiuhuan as Wu Zhi, Lin Yu's mother
- Jeremy Chan as Da Jie, Lin Yu's friend
- Melody Low as Yu Mei, Qingqing's friend
- Terence Then as Ray, Lin Yu's friend
- Roz Pho as Mei Ling, Lin Yu's sister
- Priscilla Lim as Wan Wen, Mei Ling's friend
- Danny Yeo
- Kwan Seck Mui
- Jack Neo as the school principal
- Darryl Yong
- Gurmit Singh
- Henry Thia
- Maxi Lim
- Suhaimi Yusof
- Tay Yin Yin
- Zhu Houren

== Production ==
=== Pre-production ===
According to an interview, Boris Boo said that Lim Teck of Clover Films "approached (him) to make a film about an unlucky person", and that he is "always very fascinated with the state of mind of human being", in the sense that a person "will blame any failure on luck" when he thinks he is unlucky, and if "something happened on this guy, and makes him think that there is a change in his luck, then out of a sudden, he will think he has the world under his feet", and "not only he becomes confident, but also takes failures on his stride and will brush them off easily".

=== Casting and crew ===
On 15 July 2015, during a press conference, it was announced that the film would be directed by Boris Boo, and that Chew Chor Meng and Wang Weiliang would be starring in the film. Chew was cast as Wang's father, due to his previous work experience with Boo on the set of Don't Worry Be Happy, and for his role as Ah Bee in Don't Worry Be Happy and its spin-off, Lobang King. Wang, who is best known for his role as Lobang and Mikey in the Ah Boys to Men film series in the army and military movies known as Ah Boys to Men and Ah Boys to Men 2, and also in the lion dance movies known as The Lion Men and The Lion Men: Ultimate Showdown respectively, would be taking up the lead role for the first time. Meanwhile, auditions were held for fresh female talents to play Wang's love interest.

In October, it was announced that Venus Wong and Chen Xiuhuan have joined the cast, with Wong playing Wang's love interest, and Chen playing Chew's wife. Chew and Chen had previously starred together in dramas such as The Witty Advisor and Heavenly Beings. The film was originally slated to be released on the second quarter of 2016, but has been postponed to May 2017.

=== Filming ===
Filming started on 5 October 2015, and lasted for 25 days. Most of the scenes were shot in Singapore, with some shot in Malaysia.

== Reception ==
=== Critical reception ===
Boon Chan of The Straits Times rated the film a 2 out of 5 stars, commenting that the "will-they-or-won't-they premise (of Lin Yu's pursuit for Qing Qing) drags out for far too long". Meanwhile, there could be a "much-needed trim, especially the jarring jump from light-hearted comedy romance to melodrama", and "the attempt to add some heft by incorporating real-life events from the Hotel New World collapse in 1986 to the Sars outbreak in 2003 does not really work".

=== Box office ===
As of June 21, 2017, the film collected $450,000 in the box office.
