= Aska Cheung =

Hong Kong male singer

- 張馳豪
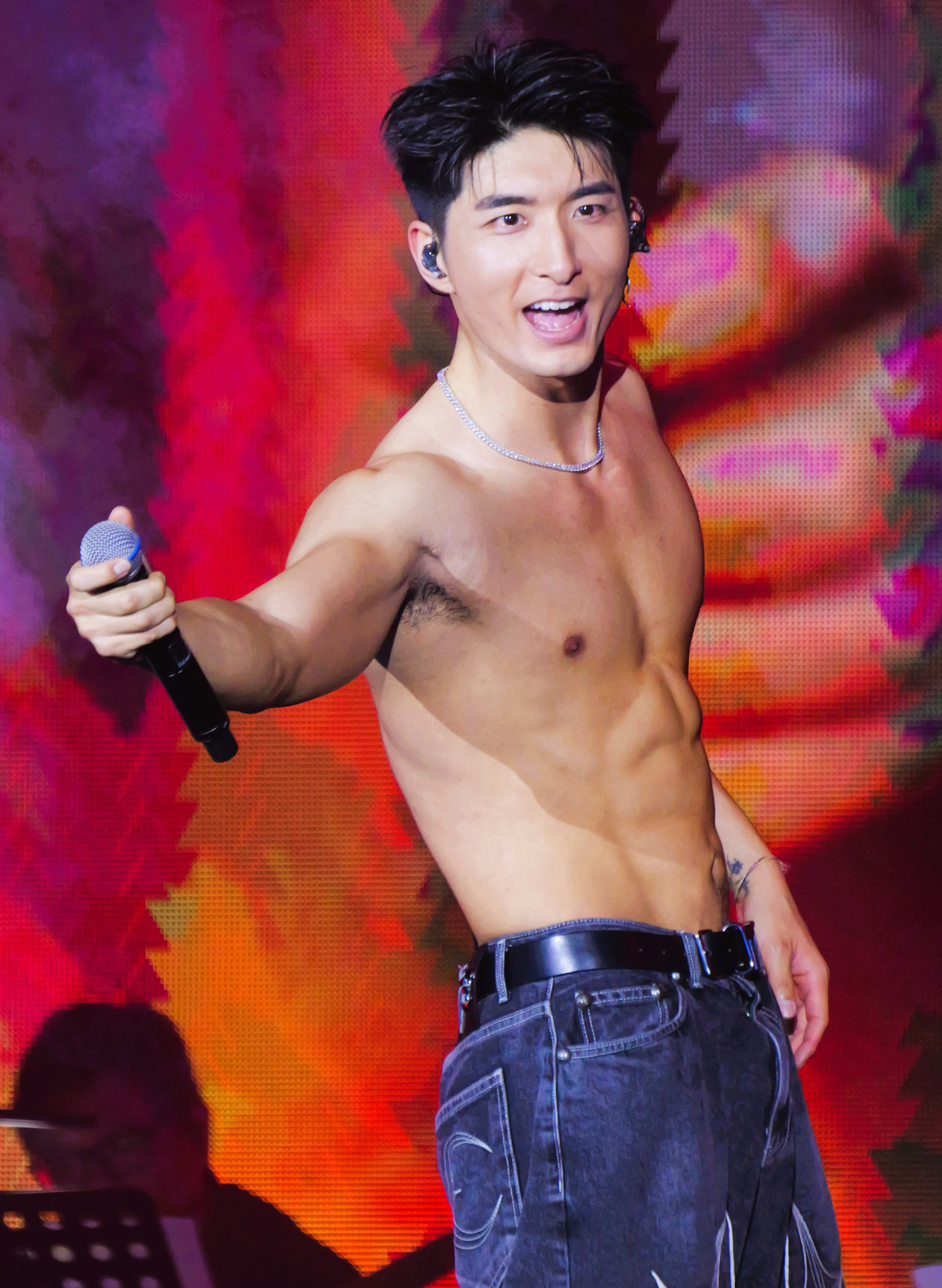
- Cheung in 2024
- Education: University of Miami (B.Sc, M.Sc.); Tufts University (dropped out)

Aska Cheung Chi-ho (Chinese: 張馳豪), Hong Kong, singer-songwriter and actor, was a contestant in the first season of TVB singing talent show Stars Academy. He is currently a TVB Music Group artist and a male singer of TVB Music Group's label All About Music. On 19 April 2022, he officially debuted with his first solo single "Behind the Colors" (色彩背面).

Cheung has won major awards including "Top Ten Outstanding Singers" at the "Metro Hot Awards Ceremony".

== Early life and education ==
Cheung attended St. Stephen's College, and Springside Chestnut Hill Academy in 2013. In 2015, due to poor grades, he could not get into a school of his choice that offered music courses, so he went to Coral Gables to major in Exercise Physiology at University of Miami for a bachelor's degree. After completing a one-year master's program in physical fitness, he obtained a fitness coach license. In 2020, Cheung enrolled in a master's program in nutrition at Tufts University in Boston, during which he chose to enter the Stars Academy competition and subsequently took a leave of absence from his studies to participate.

== Career ==
=== 2020 to present: Stars Academy debut ===
In mid-2020, Cheung signed up for the TVB singing talent show Stars Academy, and was the oldest contestant among the top 15. His fans call him "Sung Chi Ho". Cheung Chi Ho sang A Kind of Sadness by A-Lin with Kaitlyn Lam Kwan-lin during the first call-up and was subsequently selected into the Red Team. In the end, he was eliminated together with Sherman Poon in the 7th episode of Stars Academy in 2021, and stopped in the top 12. Before the competition, he had signed a five-year management contract with TVB with a group of "The Voice of China" trainees. After being eliminated, he thought that the opportunity was rare and gave up the Nutrition master's degree from Tufts University. From August 12 to 15, 2021, he and the mentors and contestants of Stars Academy held four "Stars Academy First Live On Stage" concerts at the MacPherson Stadium in Mong Kok. In December of the same year, he starred in the youth campus TV series "Forever Young At Heart" with a group of Stars Academy students and Dance for Life contestants, playing the role of "Ngai Ka-dik" in the drama, and composed many songs for the drama, developing in the direction of a singer-songwriter.

In 2022, Aska Cheung Chi-ho made his official debut by singing the theme song "Behind the Colors" for the TVB drama series The Ultimate Confession 18 Years Later 2.0. In the same year, he was awarded the "VIP Hot New Singer-Songwriter Gold Award" at the "7th VIP Music Chart Awards Ceremony".

In August, Aska Cheung Chi-ho and Chantel Yiu sang "Sunshine and Air". In September, Aska Cheung Chi-ho sang "Together For Good" with Gigi Yim. In October, Cheung played the role of Au Ka-ming in the TVB anniversary drama The Beauty of War, and composed and sang the interlude "Can't Wait for You" for the drama. From November 26 to 27, Aska Cheung Chi-ho and Chantel Yiu Cheuk-faye held two concerts at the MacPherson Stadium titled "BOC Hong Kong "Wealth Management TrendyToo" Presents: Chantel × Aska #LOMLive CONCERT".

At the end of the same year, Cheung was nominated for the "Most Popular TV Male Character" and "Best Supporting Actor" at the "2022 TVB Anniversary Awards" for his role as "Ngai Ka-dik" in "Forever Young at Heart". He was also nominated for the top five of "Most Improved Male Artist" for the first time. Cheung was also awarded the "Improved Male Artist (TV Series)" and "Best Creative Newcomer" at the "AEG Entertainment Popularity King 2022" awards ceremony, and won the "Best Duet Singing" for his duet with Chantel Yiu for "Sunshine and Air", winning a total of three awards.

On March 6, 2023, Cheung sang the theme song "Invisible Fire" for the TVB drama series "The Invisibles". On March 8, Cheung released his first non-drama single "Melanin". In April, he sang the theme song "Bubble Cucumber" of the TVB drama series "New Life Begins" with Chantel Yiu. On May 17, Cheung released his first single "Don't Be Silly, It's Okay" (傻瓜...不要緊), which received a warm response and received over 2 million hits within three weeks.

In 2024, Cheung released two personal singles "Dirty Rhythm" and "Cosmic Escape" (宇宙逃生口), both of which became champion songs on two stations, and also won Cheung the "Top Ten Outstanding Singers" award in the "New Metro Hot Awards Ceremony 2024". In the same year, Cheung participated in the TVB drama "Anti-Black Heroes", playing the role of "Lee Yiu-ching". At the end of the year, he was shortlisted for the top five "Most Improved Male Artist" at the "2024 TVB Anniversary Awards Ceremony" and won the "Best Male Newcomer"

Aska Cheung Chi-ho is good at composition. In addition to composing personal singles such as "Can't Wait for You" (沒法等你) and "Melanin" (黑色素), he also participated in the composition of lyrics for chorus songs, including "Don't Be Sad" (別難過) with Aeren Man and "Your Good Night, My Breakfast" (你的晚安 我的早餐) with Sherman Poon Ching-man. Cheung has also composed songs for many students in the "STARS Academy" series, such as "Complex" by Gigi Yim, and "I Surpass Me", the theme song of STARS Academy 2.

In addition to endorsing the fast food chain Cafe de Coral with many Stars Academy contestants, Cheung has co-filmed commercials with Chantel Yiu many times, The main ones include the advertisement commemorating the 160th anniversary of Hong Kong and China Gas in 2022, and the cover of the advertising song "Sunshine Air". He also co-endorsed the financial products of Bank of China (Hong Kong) with Moon Lau in the same year, he filmed another commercial with new spokesperson Renci Yeung the following year.
