= Sherman Poon =

Hong Kong singer, actress, and host (born 1998)

- 潘靜文
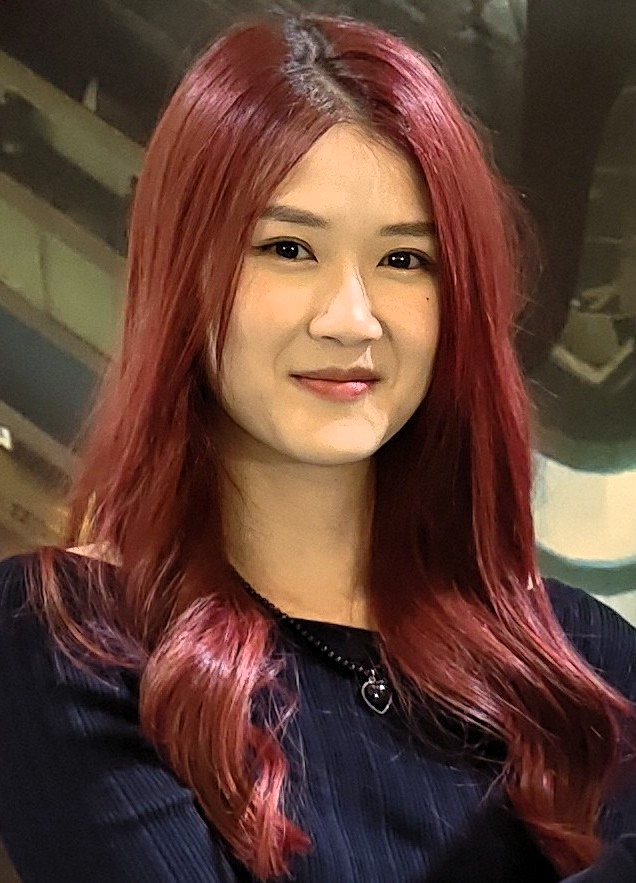
- Poon in May 2026
- Born: 24 February 1998 (age 28)
- Education: Saint Charles School; Hotung Secondary School
- Relatives: 1 older brother

Sherman Poon Ching-man (Chinese: 潘靜文; born 24 February 1998) is a Hong Kong singer, actress, and host, she was a contestant on the first season of the TVB singing talent show The Voice of Dreams. She is currently a member of the TVB artist list and a singer for the "Love Explosion Music" label under Star Dream Entertainment. She officially debuted as a solo artist on 25 February 2023, with her first single, "Forever Pandora".

== Biography ==
Poon was born 24 February 1998. She attended St. Charles School and Hotung Secondary School in her early years

Poon is a co-host of the TVB music show J Music.

=== 2020 to present: Debuted through Stars Academy ===
In mid-2020, Poon signed up for the TVB singing competition program Voice of Dreams and successfully entered the competition. Her fans are called "ChingYe Si" (Chinese: 靜夜絲), which is taken from the character "Ching" in her name. Before the competition, she and all the contestants of Stars Academy had signed singer contracts with TVB Management Contracts and Star Dream Entertainment. Ultimately, in episode 7 of Stars Academy in 2021, she was eliminated along with Aska Cheung Chi-ho, failing to advance beyond the top twelve. In August of the same year, she was assigned to host the TVB children's program Hands Up, becoming the first contestant from The Voice of Dreams to be given on-screen work. From 12 to 15 August 2021, the mentors and 15 contestants of Stars Academy held four "Stars Academy Flight First Live On Stage" concerts at the MacPherson Stadium in Mong Kok. This was the first time that Poon participated in a publicly ticketed concert.

In December 2021, TVB's youth campus drama Forever Young at Heart was broadcast, starring a group of students from Stars Academy and contestants from Dance for Life. Poon played the role of "Cheung Suet-man" in the drama, which was her first time participating in a TV series. Her on-screen romance with Aska Cheung Chi-ho garnered much attention, and they were collectively known as "SherKa." The two even created a duet song, "Your Goodnight, My Breakfast," based on their on-screen relationship.

On February 25, 2023, Poon released her first solo single, "Pandora", which was broadcast on major electronic media outlets, marking her official debut. In June, Poon co-hosted the TVB music program J Music with Archie Sin. In July, Poon and Owen Cheung sang the theme song "Like a Dream" for the TVB drama series Unchained Medley. Poon's song made it into the final five for "Best TV Song" at the "TVB Anniversary Awards 2023", and she was also nominated for "Most Improved Female Artiste" and "Most Promising Newcomer Award" for the first time.
