= Let Me Take Your Pulse =

2023 Hong Kong television series

- Also known as: 你好，我的大夫
- Genre: Medical; Romance
- Written by: Steffie Lai
- Directed by: Chan Yim-kei; Lai Pak-kin; Ho Sai-ho; Ma Kwok-on; Ho Man-yi
- Starring: Sisley Choi; Matthew Ho; Ricco Ng; Kayan Yau; Erica Chan; Danny Hung
- Ending theme: "Never Say Goodbye 不會道別" by Vivian Koo
- Country of origin: Hong Kong
- Original language: Cantonese
- No. of episodes: 25

Production
- Producer: Dave Fong
- Production location: Hong Kong
- Running time: 43 minutes
- Production company: TVB

Original release
- Network: TVB Jade; myTV Super
- Release: 11 September – 13 October 2023

Let Me Take Your Pulse (Chinese: 你好，我的大夫; lit. 'Hello My Doctor') is a Hong Kong television series created and produced by television network TVB. It premiered on 11 September 2023 and ran until 13 October 2023, spanning 25 episodes. Starring Sisley Choi and Matthew Ho, the series follows the lives of a group of young Chinese Medicine practitioners and their life journey in healing themselves and others.

== Cast ==
- Sisley Choi as Ching Ka-ying – a Traditional Chinese Medicine (TCM) physician and Chief of Staff at a government-run clinic.
  - Isabella Hsu as the child Ka-ying
- Matthew Ho as Koo Ching-king – Ka-ying's childhood friend and former partner. A PhD holder in Chinese Medicine, he spent a decade volunteering overseas before returning to Hong Kong to join the trainee program at Ka-ying's clinic.
  - Harry Lau as the child Ching-king
- Ricco Ng as Ricci Lo Yuen-chi – a junior TCM physician in the government clinic's trainee program.
- Kayan Yau as Hiraku Tong Siu-kwong – a junior TCM physician in the government clinic's trainee program.
- Erica Chan as Cicely Yuen Sze-sze – a junior TCM physician in the government clinic's trainee program.
- Danny Hung as Edgar Pang Ching-mong – a third-year graduating physician in the government clinic's trainee program.
- Lincoln Hui as Hunter Cheung Tsun-kei – a TCM physician and Ka-ying's friend and landlord; he harbors a romantic interest in her.
- Don Li as Francis Ng Wing-lam – Ka-ying's supervisor at the government clinic.
- Yen To as Grand Master Duan Zhan-hua – a renowned TCM practitioner who mentored Ching-king during his time volunteering abroad.
- Chan Ka Fai as Ching On-sang – Ka-ying's deceased father.
- Eva Lai as Sze Yuk-ling – Ka-ying's mother.
- Angelina Lo as Tin Suet-kuen – Ching-king's grandmother.
- June Ng as Sheung Wai-yan – Ka-ying's school junior and a TCM practitioner at the government clinic.
- Ngai Wai-man as Ling Wood – a TCM practitioner at the government clinic.
- Sam Tsang as Brandon Shing Ka-kit – Ching-king's biological father, a gastroenterologist and hepatologist who abandoned him before his birth.

== Plot ==
After graduating from the School of Traditional Chinese Medicine, Ching Ka-ying becomes a registered practitioner. Following a ten-year tenure at a government-run clinic, she is promoted to Chief of Staff, overseeing clinic operations and the training of new practitioners. Among the cohort of recent graduates is her childhood friend and former partner, Koo Ching-king. Their history is marked by a personal rift: years prior, Ching-king ended their relationship to pursue a doctorate in Chinese medicine.

Now serving as Ka-ying's subordinate, Ching-king maintains an idealistic approach to medicine that frequently clashes with Ka-ying's pragmatic focus on cost-effectiveness and regulatory compliance. Despite their conflicting methodologies and personal history, both are driven by a shared commitment to the field. Faced with systemic injustices within the medical industry, the pair eventually aligns their goals. Alongside a group of young physicians, they work to bypass institutional constraints and establish an ideal medical practice dedicated to patient-centered care.

== Production and background ==
The series was produced by Dave Fong, with Steffie Lai as script supervisor, and directed by a team of rotating directors. Principal photography took place between June and October 2022. This series represents the second instance in which TVB has utilized Traditional Chinese medicine as a central theme, the first being A Herbalist Affair in 2002.

The narrative explores human emotional depth, the systemic conflicts between TCM and Western medical practices, and the challenges TCM faces in achieving modern institutional recognition. During pre-production, producer Dave Fong and the screenwriting team conducted two to three months of field research into the professional lives of TCM practitioners. To maintain clinical accuracy, the series primarily adapts real-world medical cases and documented literature under the rigorous supervision of professional consultants. Additionally, the cast completed a specialized instructional course led by medical professionals prior to the commencement of filming.

== Music ==
Track Listing
| No. | Title | Lyrics | Music | Artist(s) | Length |
|---|---|---|---|---|---|
| 1. | "Four Natures and Five Flavors of Drugs* (四氣五味)" | | Alex Lau | | 0:59 |
| 2. | "Never Say Goodbye (不會道別)" | Hayes Yeung | Damon Chui; Johnny Yim | Vivian Koo | 4:12 |

(*) A direct translation of the original title is provided when no official English song title exists.

== Reception and ratings ==
The series peaked with a 22.9 rating, drawing 1.47 million viewers.

| Week | Episodes | Airing dates | Ratings (Note: According to Hong Kong's TV rating system, each rating point represents approximately 64,670 viewers.) | Ref. |
|---|---|---|---|---|
| 1 | 1 – 5 | 11–15 September 2023 | 22 points | |
| 2 | 6 – 10 | 18–22 September 2023 | 22.3 points | |
| 3 | 11 – 15 | 25–29 September 2023 | 21.4 points | |
| 4 | 16 – 20 | 2–6 October 2023 | 20.2 points | |
| 5 | 21 – 25 | 9–13 October 2023 | 22.9 points | |
