= Management contract =

Business contract

A management contract is an arrangement under which operational control of an enterprise is vested by contract in a separate enterprise that performs the necessary managerial functions in return for a fee. Management contracts involve not just selling a method of doing things (as with franchising or licensing) but actually doing them. A management contract can involve a wide range of functions such as technical operation of Design, Procurement, management of personnel, accounting, Construction work, services, and training.

Taking advantage of economies of scale, international reservation systems, and brand awareness, a large number of hotels in Asia run under management contract arrangements. It's common for contracts to span 30 years, with fees as high as 3.5% of total revenues and 6–10% of gross operating profit. Management contracts are also prevalent in the airline industry, particularly when foreign government actions restrict other entry methods. They're often employed in regions lacking local skills to manage projects. As an alternative to foreign direct investment, management contracts entail lower risk and can yield higher returns for the company. The first recorded management contract was initiated by Qantas and Duncan Upton in 1978.

== Difference between management contract and franchising ==
In business management, franchising entails a contractual relationship between the franchisor (owner of the company) and the franchisee (purchaser of the brand name). The franchisor grants the franchisee the right to use its trademark, alongside specific business systems and processes, in exchange for a fee.

Business students usually get confused between the concepts of management contracts and franchising. Although they have much in common, (both earn by selling intangibles and both works as affiliate for another company) a management contract acts as a framework and provides formation and structure to the company and its members, and franchisees remain independent.

== Advantages and disadvantages ==
A businessperson who owns several companies cannot distribute their attention to every minute detail of the company. They require some professional help with their task so they can focus on more important details. Companies that specialize in contract management may be able to help. On hiring such companies, the owner will have more time to concentrate on the expansion of the business rather than day-to-day working of the companies. The businessperson can distribute some of their basic responsibilities to these management companies such as recruitment, deployment and retention.

There are several companies that are unable to reach the peak of success due to a lack of expertise in one field or another. Such companies should hire contract management teams. This way they would not just be hiring an experienced employee but an entire team of efficient and experienced employees in technical fields of management, accountancy, marketing etc.

Management contracts give business owners an assurance of the continuity of their business. This can be illustrated through an example. A manager or any employee may terminate their job, leaving the business a hole in its team for the smooth functioning of the operations. A contract management company can easily change few employees without stirring the constancy of the business model.

Through management contracts, a businessperson can venture into international business opportunities without taking a huge risk of putting their own physical assets at stake. For example, the Heathrow Airport Holdings Limited of Britain retains general airport management skills. In the EU, Heathrow serves the Indianapolis International Airport under a 10 years management contract. It also provides retail management at the air mall in the Pittsburgh International Airport.

The government uses management contracts for the progress and development of the skill of the local managers and workers. They also accolade management contract companies to upgrade and operate public utilities.

Entering into a management contract might lead to difficulties and problems for the business owners. By entering into such agreements, businesses tends to risk their privacy. When company management is contracted to a third party, the business owner may enter into confidential disputes. These contracts could expose the business to ethical breaches, fraud and public exposure. The information of the other contracts made by the business is also available to the management contract companies. Since their responsibilities range from price negotiation to stock control they have full information about the vendors. Management responsibilities includes record of all employees, their personal information and payments procedures. Management contract companies have information on business finance also. This puts the business in a vulnerable position.

Hiring an outside contractor makes it difficult for the business to foresee the number of conflicts that can occur. For example, a business owner hires a contract management company for the operations of the company. The management company may in turn take on the management of the supplier's company too. This can lead to several compromises in the discounts, price negotiations and suppliers way of working. There can be even more conflicts when the same management company handles the management of several competitors simultaneously.

International management can be very risky for management companies. If a country is going through political or social turmoil, the life of the Manager is put at risk to carry on with the business in such a situation.

== Some popular types of management contracts ==
=== Hotel management contracts ===
==== Overview ====
Hotel management contract is a written agreement between the owner and the operator of the hotel. The base of this relationship is that the operator handles the day-to-day working of the hotel and takes up all the additional responsibilities such as maintenance, front office, housekeeping, handling food and beverages and sale. The management contract company has the power to recruit and fire the employees. The owner will authorize and pay for the capital project of the hotel but the responsibility of it is assigned to the operator. The hotel management contracts can be lengthy and complicated. The negotiation of this agreement focusing the power of the owner and the rights of the operator. The initial draft is offered by the prospective operator. It usually is in favor of the operator so that operator can seek a long-term contract. It doesn't want any interference from the owner but at the same time wants continuous supply of investment for the expansion and growth of the project.

==== Purpose of this contract ====
The main purpose of this agreement is to help investors of some hotels who lack the skill and knowledge needed to operate them. They are mere businessperson with good financial status. They lack experience or expertise in such field. Therefore, they need the assistance of such management companies who can get the output of their investment.

==== Major elements of the contract ====
- Terms and conditions of the agreement
- Length and durability of the agreement
- Procedure for early termination by either party of the contract
- Insurance policies of the hotel and its fixed assets.
- Management company ownership or investment required
- Contract terms in the event of sale of the hotel
- Incentive fees earned or penalties assessed related to operating performance
- The exclusivity of the management company
- Status of the employees

=== Construction management contracts ===
==== Overview ====
Construction management contract is between the investor and the builder. This is for use on construction projects. This contract is usually appointed by the client (investor) in the early stage. The relationship between the client and the management contractor usually covers both the work of pre-construction and construction activities. The management contractor is responsible for all the administrative and operational work of the construction project. The investor usually comes in the picture to hire the management contractor and then when the building of the project is complete. The entire work in between these two events is done by the management contractor.

The managing contractor is responsible for sub-contract claims arising from its own inadequate performance. It the elements to be included in a project, and the design of those elements, with the management expertise of a contractor organization to assist and advise in developing the design, coordinating the interface between design and construction, undertaking the construction and planning for and remaining within a target cost and target time for delivery of the project.

==== Advantages ====
Advantages of construction agreements are:

- This agreement is especially helpful when there is a lack of direction or information at the beginning of a lengthy and intricate project..
- The management contractor acts as a consultant in the early stage of building.
- The investor has to pay a single management team rather than several contractors and workers.
- Management contracts fix the price of building the project enabling the investor to calculate its finance and profit
- This enables experts to control the design, quality, cost of material used in early stages.
- The scope of making the project in accordance to the preference of customers is high.

==== Disadvantages ====
Disadvantages of construction agreements are:

- High risk of conflicts between the manager and the investor.
- The price is fixed in advance which may change from time due to change economy resulting in conflicts between the investor and manager.

== See also ==
- Outsourcing
