= Heavenly Hand =

2025 Hong Kong television series

- Also known as: 麻雀樂團
- Genre: Family; Romance; Mahjong
- Written by: Benny Wong
- Directed by: Wong Lap-kong; So Ka-lok; Chan Yim-kei; Ng Koon-ching
- Starring: Shaun Tam; Ali Lee
- Opening theme: "轉角 (Turning Point)" by Janees Wong
- Country of origin: Hong Kong
- Original language: Cantonese
- No. of episodes: 25

Production
- Producer: Marco Law
- Production location: Hong Kong
- Running time: 43 minutes
- Production company: TVB

Original release
- Network: TVB Jade; myTV Super
- Release: 28 July – 29 August 2025

Heavenly Hand (Chinese: 麻雀樂團; lit. 'The Mahjong Orchestra') is a Hong Kong television series created by TVB, with Marco Law serving as producer. The 25-episode series aired from 28 July to 29 August 2025. Set in Wan Chai, the family-focused drama blends local culture with music, exploring human relationships through mahjong culture and a symphony orchestra. Emphasizing classic TVB storytelling and nostalgia, it stars Shaun Tam and Ali Lee in the lead roles.

== Cast ==
- Shaun Tam as Szeto Kau, the owner of Tai Lung Fung, a mahjong parlor inherited from his late father. Upon learning that his long-lost daughter is a cellist in the Metro Harbour Orchestra, he provides support to the ensemble.
  - Kelvin Liu as the young Szeto Kau
- Ali Lee as Cheung Tet, a businesswoman who grew up near Tai Lung Fung and admired Szeto Kau. She was initially hired as his accountant and now manages Cheung Hing Development for his investments.
- Rosita Kwok as Shum Ka-ming, a cellist pursuing a professional orchestral career. Szeto Kau’s sponsorship provides her with additional opportunities.
- David Chiang as Au-yeung Chung, a mahjong tycoon leading Tak Wong Group and the Mahjong Association. He attempts to acquire Tai Lung Fung and expand his business empire.
- Willie Wai as Cheung Wai, a bar owner loyal to Szeto Kau, described as close as a brother.
- Telford Wong as Ching Long, a police officer adopted and raised by Szeto Kau, who balances his professional duties with family responsibilities.
- Karen Wu as Ching Ching, owner of a fast-food business gifted by her adoptive brother Szeto Kau after graduation.
- Brian Tse as Kam Hiu-sing (Kim), a renowned young Chinese conductor
- Stephen Ho as Ng Chun-keung, a veteran police officer and childhood friend of Szeto Kau and Cheung Wai.
- Axity Chong as Shum Ying, Szeto Kau's wife, who left him many years ago.

== Theme and production ==
The drama explores themes of family, human relationships, and Hong Kong's local culture, and adopts a traditional, family-oriented narrative style. The Hong Kong Amateur Orchestra acted as consultants and appeared in several performance scenes, with cast members receiving training to ensure authentic musical performances. Large-scale orchestral sequences required extensive preparation, including music arrangement, rehearsals, and instrumentation, to achieve a realistic portrayal. David Chiang, who portrays Au-yeung Chung, stated that a mahjong scene required precise coordination, memorization, and synchronized dialogue, and took two days to complete filming. The series also marked Ali Lee's final project with TVB prior to the expiration of her contract.

== Plot ==
Szeto Kau, owner of the Tai Lung Fung mahjong parlor, lives with his adopted siblings, Ching Long, a police officer, and Ching Ching, a fast-food shop owner. Years earlier, his wife Shum Ying disappeared, leaving him unaware of the daughter she had after leaving him. Kau discovers a video of a young cellist, Shum Ka-ming, and realizes she may be his daughter, prompting him to search for his family.

Ka-ming, principal cellist of the struggling Metro Harbour Orchestra, faces financial difficulties and the threat of closure. When Kau confirms her identity, he purchases the orchestra to support her, causing initial tension with his accountant Cheung Tet, who also has feelings for him. Ka-ming eventually learns the truth about her father, strengthening their father-daughter relationship.

Independently, Kau confronts Au-yeung Chung, a powerful mahjong tycoon seeking control of Tai Lung Fung. He joins the Mahjong Association to resist Chung’s influence, leading to business and mahjong confrontations. Chung, later diagnosed with cancer, reconciles with Kau and appoints Tet as his successor.

The orchestra recovers, culminating in a public concert that includes a father-daughter duet by Kau and Ka-ming. Afterwards, Ka-ming, Kam Hiu-sing, and Ching Ching pursue opportunities elsewhere, leaving Kau on his own. Two years later, Tet, having moved on, encounters them during a street performance and reunites with Kau and Ka-ming.

== Music ==
Track Listing
No.	Title	Lyrics	Music	Artist(s)	Length
1.	"Turning Point* (轉角)"	Hayes Yeung	Kwong Ching-yan/Bach	Janees Wong	1:21
2.	"Expiration Date* (有效日期)"	Hayes Yeung	Kwong Ching-yan	Janees Wong	3:16

(*) A direct translation of the original title is provided when no official English song title exists.

== Ratings ==
Week	Episodes	Airing dates	Ratings (Note: According to Hong Kong's TV rating system, each rating point represents approximately 64,670 viewers.)		Ref.
Week	Episodes	Airing dates	Cross-platform peak ratings	Viewership	Ref.
1	1 – 5	28 July–1 August 2025	19.4 points	1.26 million	
2	6 – 10	4–8 August 2025	20 points	1.29 million	
3	11 – 15	11–15 August 2025	19.4 points	1.26 million	
4	16 – 20	18–22 August 2025	20.1 points	1.30 million	
5	21 – 25	25–29 August 2025	20.5 points	1.32 million	
