= Pinky Cheung =

Hong Kong actress

- 張文慈
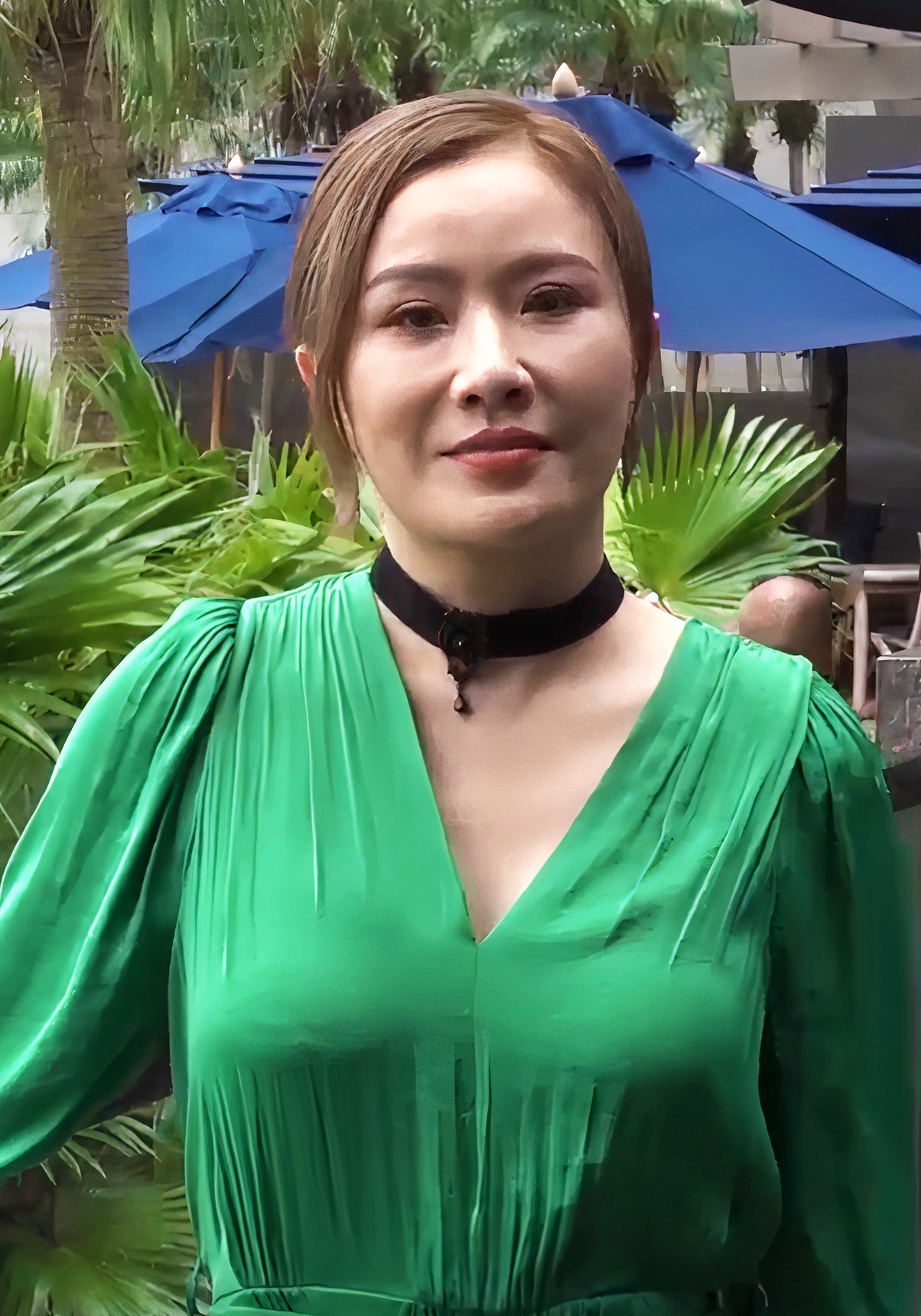
- Cheung in 2019

Pinky Cheung Man-chi (Chinese: 張文慈), is a Hong Kong actress, she was once an artist under Asia Television and currently has a basic artist contract with TVB and is a former Shaw Brothers artist.

== Background ==
Cheung has four siblings, and her parents divorced when she was four.

In July 2010, she has baptised and become a Christian. In 2012, she was awarded the "ATV55 Female Artist Award" at the 55th Anniversary of Asia Television. In 2013, she turned to the film industry and announced at an event in September 2016 that she had signed a two-year contract with TVB, mainly participated in the filming of TV series.

== Filmography ==
=== Film ===
Year	Title	Role
2013	The First Stone	
