= Asia Super Young =

2023 Chinese boy group competition show

- 亞洲超星團
- Genre: Reality; Survival competition
- Created by: Youku
- Developed by: Youku
- Presented by: Eric Tsang
- Country of origin: Hong Kong, China
- Original languages: Mandarin; Cantonese; Japanese; Korean
- No. of episodes: 15 (see list)

Production
- Running time: 139–292 minutes 268 minutes (finale)
- Production companies: TVB; Xing Kong; Youku; Star China Media

Original release
- Network: TVB; Xing Kong; Youku
- Release: November 25, 2023 – March 9, 2024

Related
- We Are Young

Asia Super Young (Chinese: 亞洲超星團; pinyin: Yàzhōu chāo xīngtuán, lit. 'Asian Superstar Cluster') is a 2023 Hong Kong male group reality competition show that premiered on November 25, 2023 on TVB and Youku. The show focuses on 65 male trainees who compete to debut in the a 9 member Hong Kong pop boy group. The final members will debut as Loong9.

== Background ==
Asia Super Young held a global audition and gathered 65 trainees who are accepting several challenges to fight for a spot in the newest boyband in Hong Kong.

== Broadcast ==
Broadcast channels	Broadcast areas	First Airing Date	Timeslot (GMT +8)
Youku International	Worldwide	November 25, 2023	Saturday 8:00pm
Youku YouTube Channel	Worldwide	November 25, 2023	Saturday 8:00pm
TVB Jade	Hong Kong; Macau (China) Guangdong	November 25, 2023	Saturday 8:00-9:30pm
myTV Super	Hong Kong; Macau	November 25, 2023	Saturday 8:00-9:30pm
TVB J2	Hong Kong	December 16, 2023	8:00-9:30pm

== Production style ==
In November 2020, Youku released an annual press conference, announcing the launching of Asia Super Young recruiting trainees worldwide.

On May 22, 2023, during the TVB's Happy Summer, TVB revealed that they would release an idol band Asia Super Young in September 2023.

"Asia Super Young" was originally scheduled to be broadcast on September 3. However, on August 22, 2023, TVB stated through the media that due to Eric Tsang's health issues and the controversy with the involvement of producer Canxing Culture, the first broadcast was announced to be postponed.

In October 2023, the trailer of "Asia Super Young" was played on TVB's Wireless Program Tour 2024, confirming that the program will be broadcast.

== Cast ==
- Eric Tsang (Executive Sponsor)
- Rain (Chief Producer)
- Cheng Xiao (Dance Mentor)
- Zhu Zhengting (Dance Mentor)
- Edmond So (Vocal Mentor)
- FAMA
  - C Kwan (Rap Mentor)
  - Luk Wing (Rap Mentor)

== Contestants ==
Color key

Final members of group
Contestant eliminated in the final episode
Contestant eliminated in the third elimination round
Contestant eliminated in the second elimination round
Left the show

65 Contestants
Ansel (阿昕然)	Albert (愛合)	Akilyar (艾克力亞)	Albert (艾煜坤)	Ollie (奥利)
Albin (白子奕)	C.I (蔡鑫)	Felix (陳梁)	Chen Xinhao (陳鑫昊)	Hiromu (大夢)
Karl (丁子朗)	Atilla (方玉亨)	Kosuke (光祐)	Guo Dianjia (郭殿甲)	Kenny (郝瑞然)
Zack (赫沐恩)	Gemini (黃輝雄)	Dillon (黃攀)	Hwang Seungdae (黃昇大)	Eliott (黃鑫)
Hugo (黃星綽)	Hugo (黃奕斌)	John (江文俊)	Kong Sonhei (江信熹)	Kim Dong-bin (金東彬)
Ely (李權哲)	Lucifer (李逸)	G-Thursday (李澤楊)	Liang Shiyu (梁詩煜)	ONE (林士元)
Leo (林展爍)	Ryunosuke (龍之介)	Roi (路己)	Bobo (羅奕傑)	Neil (寧浩然)
Pako (區珀豪)	Sean (沈梓豪)	Orenda \(舒灝)	DDMORECASH (孫竟東)	Service (孫瀟威)
Jerry (譚思源)	Skye (譚奕天)	Lui (土方琉伊)	dc (王東晨)	Walker (王坤)
Wang Muqing (汪穆清)	Dale (王顔宏)	David(衛軒汶)	Sean (文佐匡)	Aiden (吳玄曄)
Archie (冼靖峰)	Shawn (肖宇浩)	XIN (謝鑫)	Kun (徐源坤)	Ablitt (楊傳卓)
Kingsley (楊亦辰)	Yin Junlan (尹俊嵐)	DEZ (余宗遙)	Ashley (張鎬濂)	Vic (張勝希)
Sky (趙天翼)	Cheng Liyu (鄭吏佑)	Tomoki (智樹)	ONE (鐘駿一)	Tuna (朱永強)

== Rankings ==
New Top 9 (Note: Indicates contestants who had never placed in the Top 9 in any prior elimination rounds or ranking announcements.)

Ep. Rank	1	2	3	4	5	6	7	8	10	11	14	15
Ep. Rank	Contestant	Contestant	Contestant	Contestant	Contestant	Contestant	Contestant	Contestant	Contestant	Contestant	Contestant	Contestant
1	Ollie	Ely (▲1)	Atilla (▲9)	Ollie (▲3)	Ollie	Ollie	Hugo (▲4)	Kong Sonhei (▲2)	Ely (▲1)	Kong Sonhei (▲2)	Kong Sonhei	Ollie (▲3)
2	Ely	Archie (▲5)	Ely (▼1)	Kong Sonhei (▲10)	Kong Sonhei	Ely (▲1)	Ely	Ely	Liang Shiyu (▲4)	Ollie (▲5)	Ely (▲1)	Ely
3	Skye	Felix (▲9)	Archie (▼1)	Ely (▼1)	Ely	Kong Sonhei (▼1)	Archie (▲3)	Ollie (▲2)	Kong Sonhei (▲4)	Ely (▼2)	Hugo (▲9)	Archie (▲4)
4	ONE	Hugo (▲16)	Ollie (▲1)	Yin Junlan (▲4)	Yin Junlan	Gemini (▲6)	Felix (▲3)	Hugo (▼3)	Sky (▲9)	Liang Shiyu (▼2)	Ollie (▼2)	Kong Sonhei (▼3)
5	Chen Xinhao	Ollie (▼4)	Hugo (▼1)	Hugo	Hugo	Hugo	Ollie (▼4)	Guo Dianjia (▲11)	Felix (▲2)	Felix	Yin Junlan (▲2)	Liang Shiyu (▲4)
6	Yin Junlan	Sean (▲12)	Felix (▼3)	Archie (▼3)	Archie	Archie	Gemini (▼2)	Liang Shiyu (▲16)	Hugo (▼2)	Chen Xinhao (▲3)	Felix (▼1)	Albin (▲6)
7	Archie	Kim Dong-bin (▲4)	Kim Dong-bin	Kim Dong-bin	Felix (▲1)	Felix	Kong Sonhei (▼4)	Felix (▼3)	Ollie (▼4)	Yin Junlan (▲6)	Archie (▲4)	Sean (▲9)
8	Vic	Yin Junlan (▼2)	Yin Junlan	Felix (▼2)	Kim Dong-bin (▼1)	Yin Junlan (▼4)	Kim Dong-bin (▲1)	Chen Xinhao (▲27)	Guo Dianjia (▼3)	Kim Dong-bin (▲6)	Sky (▲8)	Hugo (▼5)
9	Ashley	Dillon (▲56)	Dillon	Atilla (▼8)	Chen Xinhao (▲6)	Kim Dong-bin (▼1)	Skye (▲19)	Archie (▼6)	Chen Xinhao (▼1)	Skye (▲9)	Liang Shinyu (▼5)	Felix (▼3)
