= He Changxi =

Chinese actor and singer (born 1997)

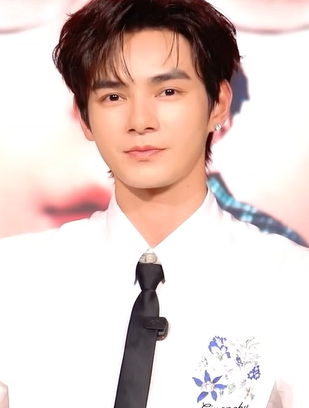
- He Changxi in 2026
- Born: He Wei (何伟); December 23, 1997 (age 28); Yueyang, Hunan, China
- Education: Beijing Contemporary Music Academy
- Occupations: Actor; Singer; Dancer; Model
- Years active: 2019–present
- Musical career
- Genre: Mandopop
- Instruments: Vocals, piano
- Years active: 2019–2020 (group)
- Formerly of: UNINE

He Changxi (Chinese: 何昶希; born December 23, 1997) is a Chinese actor and singer. He gained national recognition in 2019 after participating in the iQiyi survival reality show Youth With You, where he secured a spot in the boy band UNINE. As an actor, he has starred in leading roles in the television dramas Orange Soda (橘子汽水) (2024) on WeTV, Exchange Souls (2025) on Mango TV, Love of Petals (2025) on iQIYI, and the BL drama Sammy's Children's Day (2026) on Viki and GagaOOLala.

He has also appeared in productions such as Dear Parents (2021), Romance of a Twin Flower (春闺梦里人) (2023) and Limited 72 Hours of Love (我的盲盒恋人) (2024).

== Biography and career ==
He Changxi was born on November 24, 1997, in Yueyang, Hunan, China. He graduated from the Beijing Contemporary Music Academy, where he studied Chinese vocal music.

=== 2019–2020: Debut with UNINE ===
In early 2019, He participated as a trainee under the agency Awaken-F in the iQiyi idol survival show Youth With You. On April 6, 2019, he secured the ninth and final spot in the debut lineup, becoming a member of the project boy band UNINE.

With UNINE, He released two extended plays in 2019: UNLOCK on May 6, featuring the lead single "Bomba", and UNUSUAL on October 21. The group also embarked on a fan meeting tour titled "RUN TO U" across several Chinese cities throughout the summer of 2019. On October 6, 2020, UNINE officially held their graduation concert in Beijing, marking the group's disbandment and the beginning of He's solo career.

=== 2020–2025: Transition to acting and solo music ===
After UNINE's disbandment, He focused on acting. On November 24, 2020, he released his first solo EP, THE MAN.

He made his film debut in 2020, starring in Painted Skin: The Guo Jingming Edition and Wuliang. In 2021, he took on the role of Ouyang Ke in the martial arts film The Legend of Condor Heroes: The Cadaverous Claw. His early television roles included appearances in Dear Parents (2021) on Prime Video and a supporting part in the period drama Romance of a Twin Flower (2023).

In 2024, he gained attention for his leading role as Yan Ci in the youth romance drama Orange Soda (WeTV). The same year, he appeared in Limited 72 Hours of Love and Ancient Workplace, Love Handbook.

The year 2025 marked a significant increase in his acting projects. He starred in series Love of Petals on IQIYI, the fantasy drama Mystic Tales on Sohu TV, Ten Years of Unrequited Love on Viki, the modern suspense drama Lock Her (as Dai Shiyao) on WeTV, and Exchange Souls on MangoTV.

In 2026, He was originally cast as Song Yan in the drama Pursuit of Jade. However, due to his participation in the BL drama Sammy's Children's Day, he was reportedly placed on an informal "risk" list, and his scenes were replaced using AI face-swapping technology prior to the series' release. The incident was widely covered by Taiwanese and Hong Kong media outlets, sparking discussions about censorship and the use of AI in the entertainment industry.

In May 2026, He Changxi attended the 2026 Cannes Film Festival alongside actor He Yanzhao in connection with the drama Sammy's Children's Day.

== Filmography ==
=== Film ===
Year	Title	Role
2020	Wuliang	Feng Ren
2020	Painted Skin: The Guo Jingming Edition	Wang Sheng
2021	The Legend of Condor Heroes: The Cadaverous Claw	Ouyang Ke

=== Television series ===
Year	Title	Role	Network/Platform	Notes
2021	Dear Parents		IQIYI, Prime Video	
2023	Romance of a Twin Flower	Gui Bai	Viki	Support Role
2023	Ready for Love?	Tang Jing Xing	WeTV	
2024	Orange Soda	Yan Ci	WeTV	Main role
2024	Limited 72 Hours of Love	Jiang Hao	WeTV	Support Role
2024	Ancient Workplace, Love Handbook	Yu Wen Yan	WeTV	
2025	Love of Petals	Lu Geng Yun	iQiyi	Main role
2025	Mystic Tales	Wu Jin	Sohu TV	Main role
2025	Ten Years of Unrequited Love	Cen Siyuan	WeTV	Main role
2025	Blend Feelings	Gu Jingshi	IQIYI	Main Role
2025	Lock Her	Dai Shiyao	WeTV	Main Role
2025	Exchange Souls	Chen Yanzhi	Mango TV	Main Role
2026	Sammy's Children's Day	He Chusan	GagaOOLala, Viki	Main role

== Discography ==
=== Extended plays ===
- UNLOCK (with UNINE) (2019)
- UNUSUAL (with UNINE) (2019)
- THE MAN (2020)
- Sammy's Children's Day OST (《初三的六一儿童节》影视原声带) (2026)

=== Singles ===
- "Sneaky" (偷偷) (2022)

=== Soundtrack appearances ===
Year	Title	Album	Notes	Ref.
2026	"你會回來嗎" (Will You Come Back?) (with He Yanchao)	Sammy's Children's Day OST (《初三的六一儿童节》影视原声带)	Theme song	
2026	"請相信" (Please Believe) (with He Yanchao)	Sammy's Children's Day OST (《初三的六一儿童节》影视原声带)	Ending theme	

== Recognition ==
=== Awards and nominations ===
Year	Award	Category	Nominated work	Result
2020	2020 Phoenix New Media Fashion Choice Awards	Fashion Popular Singer of the Year	Himself	Won

=== Listicles ===
Editorial recognition
Critic/Publication	List	Rank	Ref.
Queerty	As the gay romance BL genre grows, these are the 11 hottest rising stars on the planet right now	Included	
