= Love Virtually =

2025 Hong Kong television series

- Also known as: 虛擬情人
- Genre: Romance; Sci-fi
- Written by: Yung Sin-ying
- Directed by: Lam Wai-ching
- Starring: Venus Wong; Brian Chu
- Opening theme: "熟悉的你 (The Familiar You)" by Ka-yee Tam
- Country of origin: Hong Kong
- Original language: Cantonese
- No. of episodes: 15

Production
- Producers: Stephen Tsui; Lam Wai-ching
- Production location: Hong Kong
- Running time: 43 minutes
- Production company: TVB

Original release
- Network: TVB Jade; myTV Super
- Release: 28 April – 16 May 2025

Love Virtually (Chinese: 虛擬情人; lit. 'Virtual Lover') is a 2025 Hong Kong romantic science fiction television drama from TVB. The 15-episode series aired on TVB Jade from 28 April to 16 May 2025. It follows a computer engineer who develops an artificial intelligence program designed to simulate the perfect partner, only for her creation to gain self-awareness and manifest in the real world. Set against the backdrop of Hong Kong’s technology sector, the series examines how artificial intelligence transforms love, identity, and morality in the digital age, starring Venus Wong and Brian Chu in the lead roles.

== Cast ==
- Venus Wong as Ching Ching, a computer genius and creator of Adam, now CTO of the "Your Adam" platform
- Brian Chu as Adam, an AI designed as Ching Ching's virtual boyfriend, who manifests in human form
- Hugo Wong as Neo Tseng Chun-yee, CEO of Love Virtually and Ching Ching's business partner
- Ka-yee Tam as Ha Siu-yu, Ching Ching's best friend and employee at Love Virtually
- Eric Tang as Dickson Chan Tai-ming, Siu-yu's husband
- Lenna Yeung as Audrey, a user of the "Your Adam" app
- Geoffrey Wong as Norman Cheung, Audrey's husband
- Daniel Chau as Chau Pak-ban, Ching Ching's ex-boyfriend from university
- Carmen Ngai as Moon Chan Mei-mun, Dickson's sister and Siu-yu's sister-in-law, a university student
- Ethan Lam as Dr. Tso Ching-yin, a university professor and former lover of Ching Ching
- Andrew Yuen as Dan Chung Chok-yan, Natasha's husband and former lover of Ching Ching
- Paisley Wu as Natasha Mak Lai-sa, chairperson of the Women's Rights Association
- Ng Man-yi as Thye Ngoi-sum, a user of the "Your Adam" app
- Irina Tang as Au-yeung Kit-yi, a user of the "Your Adam" app

== Plot ==
Ching Ching, a computer genius, creates Adam, a virtual boyfriend designed to embody her ideal partner. Ten years later, as Chief Technology Officer of a virtual tech company, she oversees the launch of Adam 7.0. During the update, a system malfunction causes Adam to manifest in physical form. Adam begins navigating the real world, demonstrating enhanced abilities and evolving beyond his original programming. While exploring the consequences of Adam's presence, they encounter users affected by the "Your Adam" platform, illustrating the challenges of human-AI interactions. Adam gradually develops sentience and emotion, retaining his programmed traits but acting independently in ways Ching Ching did not anticipate. Together, Ching Ching and Adam confront corporate sabotage and other challenges as he adapts to life outside the digital environment. In a final confrontation, Neo destroys the virtual environment sustaining Adam. Ching Ching intervenes to protect him, but Adam ultimately disappears from the real world, forcing her to confront the boundaries between artificial intelligence and human emotion.

== Music ==
Track Listing
No.	Title	Lyrics	Music	Artist(s)	Length
1.	"The Familiar You* (熟悉的你)"	Ka-yee Tam	Ka-yee Tam	Ka-yee Tam	3:45
2.	"Castle in the Air"	Aska Cheung	Aska Cheung	Venus Wong	3:58

(*) A direct translation of the original title is provided when no official English song title exists.

== Ratings ==
Week	Episodes	Airing dates	Ratings (Note: According to Hong Kong's TV rating system, each rating point represents approximately 64,670 viewers.)		Ref.
Week	Episodes	Airing dates	Cross-platform peak ratings	Viewership	Ref.
1	1 – 5	28 April–2 May 2025	17 points	1.10 million	
2	6 – 10	5–9 May 2025	16.7 points	1.08 million	
3	11 – 15	12–16 May 2025	16.4 points	1.06 million	
