= Venus Wong =

Hong Kong actress

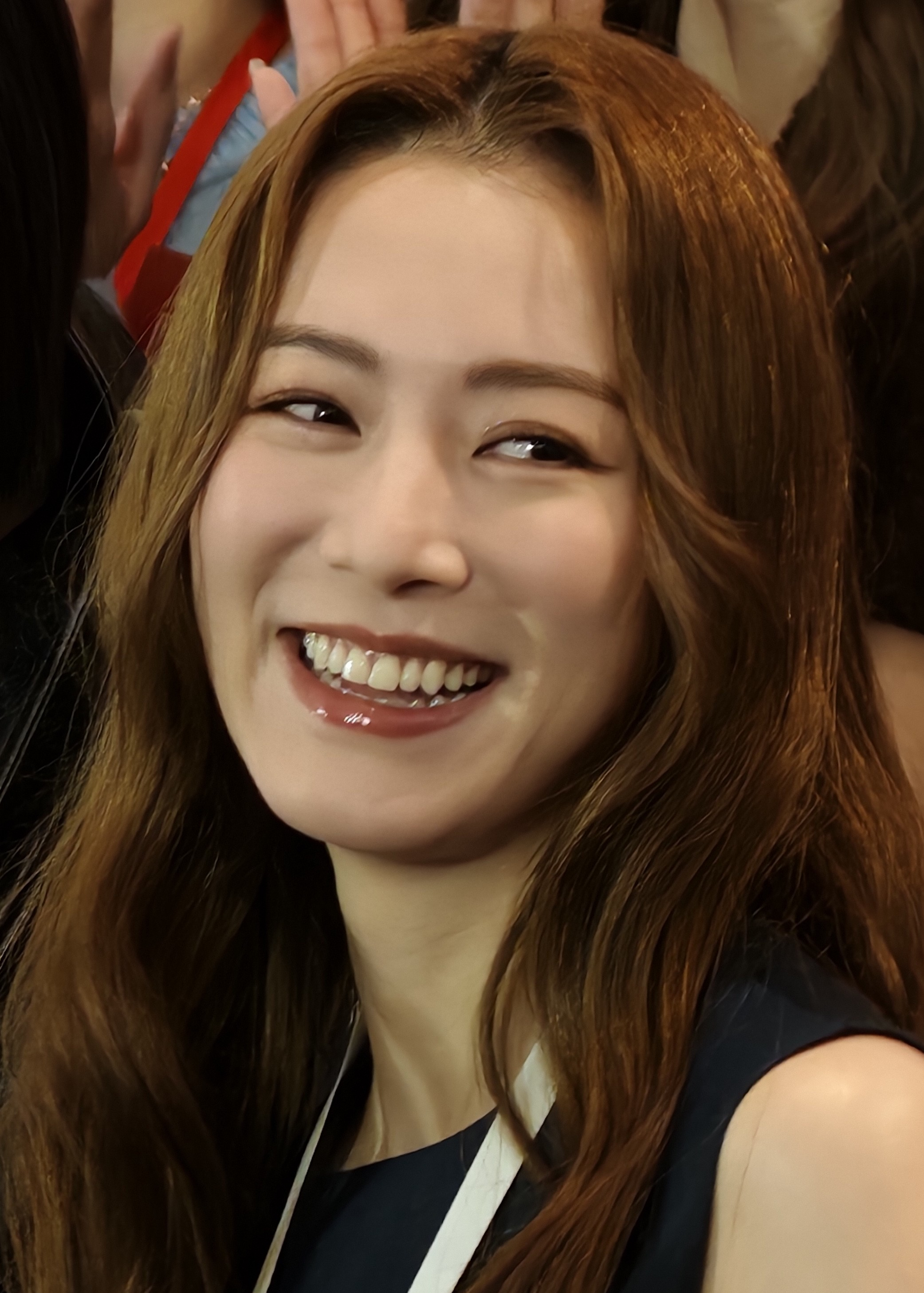
- Wong in November 2025
- Born: 1 January 1992 (age 34); Huizhou, Guangdong, China
- Occupations: Actress; model
- Spouse: Derek Tsang (m. 2019)

Venus Wong
- Chinese: 王敏奕
Transcriptions
Standard Mandarin
- Hanyu Pinyin: Wáng Mǐnyì
Yue: Cantonese
- Jyutping: Wong4 Man5 Jik6

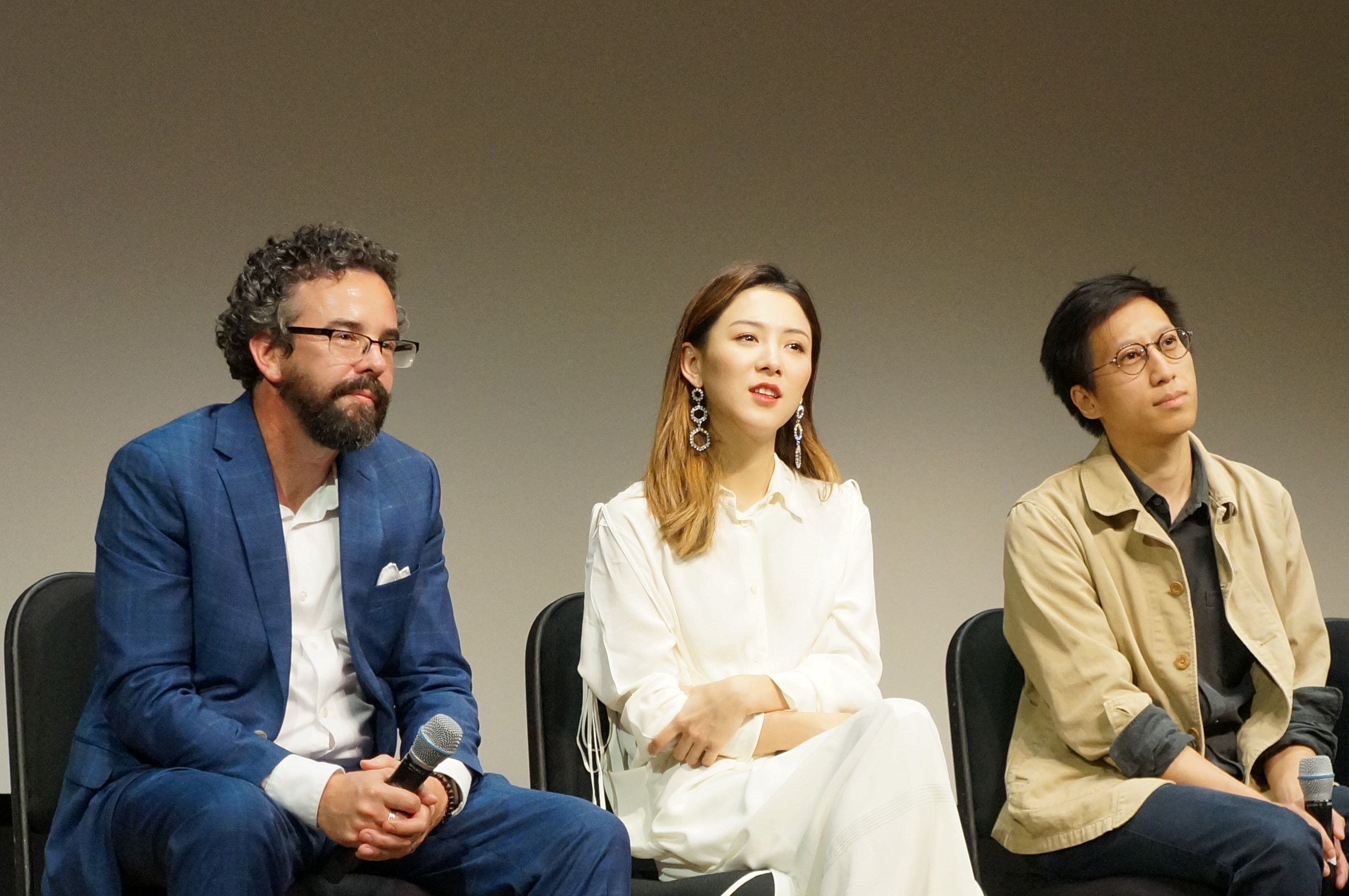
Panel discussion of Zombiology: Enjoy Yourself Tonight (2017) at the Freer Sackler Gallery. (2018) (Left to right: Tom, Wong, and Alan Lo.)

Venus Wong Man-yik (Chinese: 王敏奕; pinyin: Wáng Mǐnyì) is a Hong Kong actress currently contracted to TVB and TVB Music Group.

== Biography ==
=== Early life ===
Wong was born in 1992 in Huizhou, Guangdong, China and moved to Hong Kong when she was 1 years old along with her mother. She attended Christ Church Ching Wan Primary School and Rosehill School.

=== Career ===
In 2006, Wong participated in the television show Y2K Series (Y2K系列) at 14 years old. In 2008, she made her film debut in the movie High Noon (烈日當空) as a supporting character. In the same year, she appeared in the TV show "性本善" and played a waitress in the film Forgive and Forget (親愛的). Wong had appeared in a number of supporting roles in films, such as To Love or Not to Love, Camera and Lucky Boy. After playing a few more minor roles, she studied at the City University of Hong Kong before dropping out in 2012 to study Drama in New York City, United States. She had also appeared in numerous TV commercials and had promoted brands such as Olympus, Nokia and Brandy.

In 2013, Wong filmed her first TVB drama Never Dance Alone, playing the younger version of Rachel Lee’s character. The drama was broadcast in 2014. In 2020, she signed contracts with TVB and The Voice Entertainment（now known as TVB Music Group）.

== Personal life ==
In 2019, Wong married Hong Kong filmmaker Derek Tsang at Niki Hills, Hokkaido, Japan.

== Filmography ==
=== Films ===
Year	Film	Role	Ref.
2008	Forgive and Forget	Waitress	
2008	High Noon	Soy Sauce's girlfriend	
2009	Love Connected	Venus	
2010	Girl$	Gucci	
2012	Diva	Gennie	
2013	The Midas Touch	Ho Miu-miu	
2014	Streets of Macao		
2014	À Espera		
2014	Uncertain Relationship Society	Lee Ning	
2015	King of Mahjong	Bak Sei-hei	
2015	Knock Knock! Who's There?	Carmen	
2016	Good Take Too		
2017	To Love or Not to Love	Cha Tsz-kei	
2017	Lucky Boy	Zhang Qingqing	
2017	Zombiology: Enjoy Yourself Tonight	Nip Yee-suen	
2020	The Secret Diary of a Mom to Be		
2020	Unleashed	Elfy Lam	
2020	Hell Bank Presents: Running Ghost	Chow Bo-yi	
2021	Anita	MIWA	
2025	Reborn		

=== Television dramas ===
==== TVB ====
Year	Title	Role	Notes	Ref.
2014	ICAC Investigators 2014	Kwok Siu-lam	Ep. 1	
2014	Never Dance Alone	Young Julie Chu Li	Younger version of Rachel Lee’s character	
2020	Hong Kong Love Stories	"Shay" Chan Tsz-yan	Main Role	
2021	Murder Diary	Dr. Fong Yuen-chin	Main Role	
2021	The Line Watchers	"Kay" Wan Tsz-ki	Main Role	
2022	Forensic Heroes V	Fok Bo-ying	Main Role	
2023	The Queen of News	Carrie Lau Yim	Major Supporting Role	
2024	The Spectator	Yiu Chi-yu	Main Role	
2024	Happily Ever After?	Mira Lui Ching-hoi	Main Role	
2025	Love Virtually	Ching Ching	Main Role	
2025	The Queen of News 2	Carrie Lau Yim	Main Role	

==== Mediacorp and Toggle Originals ====
Year	Title	Role	Notes
2016	K.O.	Kit Li	Main Role

==== Shaw Brothers Pictures ====
Year	Title	Role	Notes
2018	Flying Tiger	Tai Yi-fei	Major Supporting Role

==== ViuTV ====
Year	Title	Role	Notes
2019	The Republic	Fiona Fong	Main Role
2019	#MeToo	Lam Tsz-wai	Main Role

== Awards and nominations ==
Year	Award	Result
2020	TVB Anniversary Award for Most Popular Female Character	Nominated
2021	TVB Anniversary Award for Most Improved Female Artiste	Nominated (Top 5)
2021	TVB Anniversary Award for Best Actress	Nominated (Top 10)
2021	TVB Anniversary Award for Most Popular Female Character	Nominated
2021	TVB Anniversary Award for Favourite TVB Actress in Malaysia	Nominated
2021	People’s Choice Television Award for Most Improved Female Artiste	Nominated
2021	People’s Choice Television Award for Best Actress	Nominated
2022	TVB Anniversary Award for Best Actress	Nominated
2022	TVB Anniversary Award for Most Popular Female Character	Nominated (Top 10)
2022	TVB Anniversary Award for Favourite TVB Actress in Malaysia	Nominated (Top 10)
2022	TVB Anniversary Award for Most Popular Onscreen Partnership (with Bosco Wong	Nominated
2022	TVB Anniversary Award for Most Popular TV Soundtrack	Nominated
2023	TVB Anniversary Award for Most Improved Female Artiste	Nominated (Top 5)
2023	TVB Anniversary Award for Best Supporting Actress	Nominated (Top 5)
