= Danny Hung =

- Hung in 2026
- Born: 19 June 1997 (age 29); Hong Kong
- Occupation: Actor
- Musical career
- Also known as: Hung Tak-yin

Danny Hung Tak-yin (孔德賢; born 19 June 1997) is a Hong Kong male television actor currently with Hong Kong's television station TVB.

== Background ==
Hung was born in Hong Kong. In 2019, he received an Honours Bachelor of Science in Building Engineering and Management from Hong Kong Polytechnic University.

== Career ==
He started to become a model since his first year of undergraduate degree. Besides, he also took part at the singing contest called iMusic iDol contest 2016 and eventually clinched second runner-up. Later on, he signed on to TVB as a full-time contracted artiste. As of his eloquence, he was often assigned to host programs at TVB Jade and Big Big Channel.

== Filmography ==
=== Television ===
- Hong Kong Love Stories (2020)
- Sinister Beings (2021)
- The Line Watchers (2021)
- Kids' Lives Matter (2021)
- Flying Tiger 3 (2022)
- Freedom Memories (2022)
- Mission Run (2023)
- Speakers of Law (2023)
- Let Me Take Your Pulse (2023)
- A Fallen Xian (2024)
- Happily Ever After? (2024)
- The Map Of Truth (2026)
- Mrs. Revenge (2026)
- This City Never Sleeps (2026)

=== Films ===
- Peg O' My Heart (2024)
