= List of Hong Kong films of 2013 =

This article lists feature-length Hong Kong films released in 2013.

== Box office ==
The highest-grossing Hong Kong films released in 2013 by domestic box office gross revenue, are as follows:

Highest-grossing films released in 2013
Rank	Title	Domestic gross
1	Unbeatable	HK$44,631,344
2	The White Storm	HK$31,938,819
3	Journey to the West: Conquering the Demons	HK$28,401,227
4	Firestorm	HK$24,318,340
5	The Grandmaster	HK$21,292,885
6	Out of Inferno	HK$20,333,828
7	Hotel Deluxe	HK$19,443,275
8	Rigor Mortis	HK$17,164,014
9	I Love Hong Kong 2013	HK$16,953,263
10	SDU: Sex Duties Unit	HK$16,747,563

== Releases ==
Title	Director	Cast	Genre	Notes
4 in Life	Lee Lik-chi	Susan Tse, Gigi Leung, Ken Hung, Natalis Chan, David Chiang	Drama	In theaters 26 November 2013
A Secret Between Us	Patrick Kong	Angel Chiang, Edward Ma, Elena Kong, Evergreen Mak Cheung-ching, Kiki Sheung	Romance / Drama	In theaters 12 September 2013
Baby Blues	Po-Chih Leong	Raymond Lam, Kate Tsui, Karena Ng, Janelle Sing, Lo Hoi-pang	Horror	In theaters 31 October 2013
Badges of Fury	Wong Chi-ming	Jet Li, Wen Zhang, Collin Chou, Liu Shishi, Michelle Chen, Wu Jing	Action	In theaters 21 June 2013
Bends	Flora Lau	Carina Lau, Chen Kun	Drama	Entered into the 2013 Cannes Film Festival; In theaters 21 November 2013
The Best Plan is No Plan	Patrick Kong	Sammy Sum, Justin Cheung, Hanjin Tan, Shiga Lin, Jacqueline Chong, Jinny Ng, Angel Chiang, Elva Ni	Comedy	In theaters 17 October 2013
Blind Detective	Johnnie To	Andy Lau, Sammi Cheng	Action / Drama	In theaters 4 July 2013
Christmas Rose	Charlie Yeung	Aaron Kwok, Xia Yu, Gwei Lun-mei, Qin Hailu, Liu Kai-chi, Wan Qian	Drama / Mystery / Crime	In theaters 23 May 2013
A Complicated Story	Kiwi Chow	Jacky Cheung, Zhu Zhiying, Stephanie Che, Lo Hoi-pang, Deanie Ip	Drama	Entered into the 2013 Hong Kong International Film Festival; In theaters 16 January 2014
Conspirators	Oxide Pang	Aaron Kwok, Nick Cheung	Crime / Thriller	In theaters 11 April 2013
The Constable	Dennis Law	Simon Yam, Lam Suet, Sam Lee, Ken Lo, Maggie Shiu, Nick Wang, Niu Mengmeng, Maggie Li, Lee Kam Kong	Action	In theaters 28 November 2013
Doomsday Party	Ho Hong	Paul Wong, Kay Tse, Kelvin Kwan, Teddy Robin, Wilfred Lau, Cheung Kwok-keung, Maggie Chan	Drama / Thriller / Crime	In theaters 28 November 2013
Firestorm	Alan Yuen	Andy Lau, Ray Lui, Hu Jun, Gordon Lam, Yao Chen, Terence Yin, Bonnie Sin, Michael Tong	Action	In theaters 19 December 2013
The Grandmaster	Wong Kar-wai	Tony Leung Chiu-Wai, Zhang Ziyi, Chang Chen, Julian Cheung	Martial Arts	In theaters 10 January 2013
Hardcore Comedy	Richard Zhuang	William Chan, Dada Chan, Christine Kuo, Michelle Wai, Terence Siufay, Oscar Leung, Alien Sun, Celia Sie	Comedy	In theaters 19 September 2013
Hotel Deluxe	Vincent Kok	Sandra Ng, Chapman To, Lynn Hung, Jim Chim, Raymond Wong, Fiona Sit, Eric Kot, Karena Ng, Teresa Mo, Ronald Cheng	Comedy	In theaters 7 February 2013
I Love Hong Kong 2013	Chung Shu-kai	Alan Tam, Veronica Yip, Natalis Chan, Eric Tsang, Stanley Fung, Bosco Wong, Michael Tse, Kate Tsui, Joyce Cheng	Comedy	In theaters 7 February 2013
Ip Man: The Final Fight	Herman Yau	Anthony Wong, Anita Yuen, Eric Tsang, Jordan Chan, Gillian Chung, Timmy Hung	Action / Martial Arts	In theaters 28 March 2013
Journey to the West: Conquering the Demons	Stephen Chow; Derek Kwok	Shu Qi, Wen Zhang, Huang Bo	Comedy	In theaters 7 February 2013
Kick Ass Girls	Cheuk Wan-chi	Chrissie Chau, Hidy Yu, Dada Lo, Cheuk Wan Chi, Chris Tong, Emily Lim, Chui Tien-you, La Ying, Chiu King-ho, Gu Youming	Action	In theaters 14 November 2013
May We Chat	Philip Yung	Kabby Hui, Heidi Lee, Rainky Wai, Irene Wan, Mak Tak-woh	Drama	Entered into the 2013 Hong Kong Asian Film Festival; In theaters 19 June 2014
The Midas Touch	Fung Chi-keung	Chapman To, Charlene Choi, Gillian Chung, Wong Cho-lam, Yumiko Cheng, He Jiong, Lo Hoi-pang, Louis Cheng, Vincy Chan, Hins Cheung, Gao Yunxiang, Deep Ng, Sixwing, Stephanie Che, Steven Cheung, Mani Fok	Comedy	In theaters 5 September 2013
Mortician	Cub Chin	Jim Chim, Bao Bei'er, Lam Chi-chung, Monica Mok, Janice Man, Stanley Fung	Comedy / Fantasy	In theaters 16 May 2013 (China)
Mr. & Mrs. Player	Wong Jing	Chapman To, Chrissie Chau, Matt Chow, Pang Ho-cheung	Comedy	In theaters 26 September 2013
Out of Inferno	Danny Pang Phat; Oxide Pang	Sean Lau, Louis Koo, Angelica Lee, Cheung Siu-fai, Natalie Tong	Drama / Disaster	In theaters 3 October 2013
Paper Moon	Stanley Law	Gordon Lam, Chrissie Chau, Tedd Chan, Yeo Yann Yann, Zhang Shunyuan	Drama / Romance	In theaters 17 January 2013
Princess and the Seven Kung Fu Masters	Wong Jing; Venus Keung	Sammo Hung, Sandra Ng, Ronald Cheng, Eric Tsang, Wong Cho-lam, Xie Na	Action / Martial Arts / Comedy	In theaters 8 March 2013
Rigor Mortis	Juno Mak	Chin Siu-ho, Anthony Chan, Billy Lau, Kara Hui, Paw Hee-ching, Lo Hoi-pang, Siu Yam-yam	Horror / Fantasy	In theaters 24 October 2013
Saving General Yang	Ronny Yu	Adam Cheng, Ekin Cheng, Wu Chun, Raymond Lam, Vic Zhou	Martial Arts / Action	In theaters 4 April 2013
SDU: Sex Duties Unit	Mak Wing-lun	Chapman To, Shawn Yue, Derek Tsang, Matt Chow, JJ Jia, Dada Chan, Benz Hui	Comedy	In theaters 25 July 2013
Special ID	Clarence Fok	Donnie Yen, Collin Chou, Jing Tian, Andy On, Zhang Hanyu, Paw Hee-ching	Action/Martial Arts	In theaters 18 October 2013
Switch	Jay Sun	Andy Lau, Tong Dawei, Zhang Jingchu, Lin Chi-ling	Action	In theaters 12 June 2013
Tales from the Dark 1	Simon Yam; Lee Chi-ngai; Fruit Chan	Simon Yam, Tony Leung Ka-fai, Kelly Chen, Lam Suet, Dada Chan, Siu Yam-yam, Yuen Qiu, Maggie Shiu, Josephine Koo, Lo Hoi-pang	Horror	In theaters 11 July 2013
Tales from the Dark 2	Teddy Robin; Gordon Chan; Lawrence Ah Mon	Gordon Lam, Fala Chen, Newton Lai, Siu Yam-yam	Horror	In theaters 8 August 2013
Together	Clarence Fok	Donnie Yen, Michelle Chen, Ko Chen-tung, Angelababy, Bosco Wong	Romance / Drama	In theaters 14 February 2013
Unbeatable	Dante Lam	Nick Cheung, Peng Yuyan	Action	In theaters 15 August 2013
Voyage	Danny Cheng Wan-Cheung ('Scud')	Adrian 'Ron' Heung, Byron Pang, Haze Leung, Debra Baker	Drama	Entered into the 2013 Chicago International Film Festival; In theaters 20 December 2013
The Way We Dance	Adam Wong	Cherry Ngan, Lokman Yeung, Choi Hon Yik, Paul Wong, Tommy Ly	Musical	In theaters 8 August 2013
The White Storm	Benny Chan	Sean Lau, Louis Koo, Nick Cheung, Lo Hoi-pang, Yuan Quan, Ken Lo	Crime thriller	In theaters 5 December 2013
Young and Dangerous: Reloaded	Daniel Chan	Him Law, Oscar Leung, Alex Lam, He Haowen, Paul Wong, Philip Ng, Denise Ho, Sammy Sum, Michelle Hu, Jacqueline Chong, Jim Chim, Bob Lam, Winnie Leung, Pal Sinn, Alex Man	Action / Crime	In theaters 10 January 2013
Young Detective Dee: Rise of the Sea Dragon	Tsui Hark	Mark Chao, Feng Shaofeng, Carina Lau, Angelababy, Kim Bum, Lin Gengxin	Action / Crime	In theaters 27 September 2013
