= Anita Chui =

Hong Kong actress (born 1988)

- 崔碧珈
- Born: May 27, 1988 (age 38); British Hong Kong
- Education: York International Kindergarten and Primary School; (Kowloon Tong, Hong Kong); Pentecostal School; (Ho Man Tin, Hong Kong); University of Central Lancashire; (Bachelor of Accounting and Marketing); University of Sheffield; (Master of Business Administration year 2 dropped out); Met Film School; (1 year Acting and Producing Course in London)
- Occupations: Actress; Singer-Songwriter; Film Producer
- Years active: 2014–present
- Agents: Sun Entertainment Culture (2012–2017); Golden Shadow Entertainment Limited (2018–present); Honger Music Venture (2022–2024)
- Height: 174 cm (5 ft 9 in)
- Musical career
- Instruments: Vocals, Piano
- Website: https://www.instagram.com/anitachui/

Anita Chui (Chinese: 崔碧珈) was born in Hong Kong, a British Chinese actress, singer, and film producer. Her family moved to the UK when she was little. She returned to Hong Kong to pursue acting career in film since 2012 and gained attention in Hong Kong with her leading role in Special Female Force (2016). She later rose to prominence in Asia with her other leading roles in Robbery (2016), OCTB (2018), and King of Hawkers (2024) etc. Plus, Chui is the author of a keto diet book that was widely distributed in Asia (2019). She began her singing career with debut Cantonese single Get It Right (2022). Chui also started acting career in France and she produced her debut film, the French Italian feature Follia (2023), which premiered at the 45th Moscow International Film Festival and was released in European cinemas over 10 countries. Chui's company, Golden Shadow Entertainment Limited was found in 2018, partnering with the Hong Kong listed company Culturecom to host the first edition of the Golden Shadow International Film Festival (GSIFF) in cinéma des beau arts Monte Carlo, Monaco in June 2026 and repeat it every June thereafter.

== Early life ==
Chui was born into an upper-class family in Hong Kong. She began study the Kumon Method at the age of five, focusing on English and mathematics. Chui started learning piano at the age of three, passing her Associated Board of the Royal Schools of Music (ABRSM) Grade 8 exam when she was 13. Her parents divorced when she was 18.

== Education ==
Chui completed her primary education at the York International Kindergarten and York English Primary School in Kowloon Tong, Hong Kong. For her secondary education, she was assigned to the Pentecostal School in Ho Man Tin, Hong Kong.

Chui was active in various sports and performing arts at school. During her time at secondary school, she represented the Pentecostal School in the English poetry competition at the Hong Kong Schools Speech Festival. Chui was a soprano in the school's choir and a member of the school volleyball team.

Chui's parents sent her to the United Kingdom for further study after her secondary schooling. While in the United Kingdom, she received a bachelor's degree in accounting and marketing from the University of Central Lancashire. Chui started a master's degree course in business administration at the University of Sheffield but dropped out after her second year and started her artistic career. During her time at the University of Sheffield, Chui represented the university as part of the cheerleading team.

== Career ==
=== Acting ===
During the second year of her master's degree, Chui met Paco Wong, the manager of Sun Entertainment Culture, during her term-break in Hong Kong in 2012. After the meeting, she decided to abandon her master's degree and stayed in Hong Kong to sign a five-year acting contract with Sun Entertainment Culture. In the same year, Sun Entertainment Culture arranged for Chui to receive acting tuition; some of her tutors included Jim Chim Sui-man and Kearen Pang.

Chui began her acting career in Hong Kong: from 2012 to 2017, she participated in over 20 local Hong Kong films. In February 2014, Chui was cast in Special Female Force by the director Wilson Chin Kwok-Wai. This was her first lead role in film. Special Female Force was filmed in Malaysia from April 2014 to July 2014 and was released in the summer of 2016.

In 2016, Chui published a photo book: Sweat Anita. The photo book was shot in Hong Kong and Macau by Ronald Lam and took seven days to complete.

After a discussion with Paco Wong in 2017, Chui left Sun Entertainment Culture and continued to study acting and film production at the Met Film School, London. At the same time, she recruited her own team to manage her artistic career, forming the Golden Shadow Entertainment company in 2018.

On 9 May 2018, Chui was invited by Sasha Waseem, a Fashion TV journalist, to attend the red carpet for a screening of Sorry Angel at the 71st Cannes Film Festival. She attended with the actress Patricia Gloria Contreras, wearing a gown from the designer Christophe Guillarmé. At Cannes, Chui met Charles Guérin Surville, a French director. Chui and Surville decided to produce a film together called Follia. Filming took place in Italy and France until May 2019. Following the film's completion, Chui was invited by Caroline Scheufele, co-president of Chopard, to attend the red carpet at the 72nd Cannes Film Festival closing ceremony.

During her time in Europe, Chui worked on writing her second book, Anita's Keto Diet, which is about the ketogenic diet. Writing the book took her three months; a seven-day photo shoot for the book was then taken in Tokyo, Japan. The book was launched in July 2019 in Hong Kong and was published in several Asian countries.

From December 2019 to March 2020, Chui went to Los Angeles, United States, to audition for a Hollywood action movie. She received a supporting role. For the film, Chui began to receive movie stunt training from Tim Storms. At the beginning of the COVID-19 pandemic, production was postponed due to lockdown. During the pandemic, Chui went back to Hong Kong.

In 2021, the British-Chinese producer and director Bizhan Tong cast Chui in the film Lockdown. The entire film was filmed separately in the United States, the United Kingdom, Italy and Hong Kong. Chui filmed her part at an indoor ATV studio in Hong Kong.

In June 2022, Chui signed under Honger Music Venture with manager Audrey Tang and the company hold a big press conference at the Shangri-La hotel in Hong Kong. She began her singing career with the debut single “Get It Right” produced by a top music producer Adrian Chan. In November 2022, Chui released her second single “Clown and Queen”.

In March 2023, Chui was invited to attend the Moscow Film Festival.

=== Music ===
During the COVID-19 pandemic, Chui took vocal tutoring in Hong Kong with Christine Samson, Clayton Cheung and Jessica Lam. She also took pop piano lessons with John Weiffenbach at the New Wave Music, and dance classes at the Ones To Watch Dance Company. Chui also received training on her British and American accents over Zoom with Tara Chiusano.

In January 2022, Chui signed a ten-year contract with Honger Music Venture during the company's 15th anniversary. Her debut song, Get It Right, was officially released on 14 June 2022 during press conference at the Kowloon Shangri-La hotel ballroom.

== Filmography ==
=== Films ===
- Lan Kwai Fong 2 (2012)
- Hotel Deluxe (2013)
- SDU: Sex Duties Unit (2013)
- The Best Plan Is No Plan (2013)
- Delete My Love (2014)
- Imprisoned: Survival Guide for Rich and Prodigal (2015)
- Lost in Hong Kong (2015)
- Love Detective (2015)
- From Vegas to Macau III (2016)
- PG Love (2016)
- Robbery (2016)
- Special Female Force (2016)
- L for Love L for Lies (2017)
- Zombiology: Enjoy Yourself Tonight (2017)
- The Cursed (2018)
- Lion Rock (2019)
- Islamophobia (2022)
- 我的前世情人 (2022)
- AUDITION (2022)
- FOLLIA (2023)
- King of Hawkers (2024)

=== TV drama ===
- I Love HK (2016) – variety show on TVB
- OCTB (2017)
- Chest of Tricks (2017) – ViuTV variety show
- 我的家庭醫生3之等價交換 (2018) – on RTHK
- The Trading Floor (2018)

=== Advertisements ===
- Prince Cake Shop (2013)
- Perfection Wedding Dress (2013)
- Miai Jewelry (2013)
- Reface Clinic (2018)
- The Walnut Shop (2020)
- Durex (2020)
- Biggerfit (2020)
- re:HEALTH (2021)

== Discography ==
=== Singles ===
- Get it Right (2022)
- Clown and Queen (2022)
- KING OF HAWKERS movie theme song: Fallen Love (2024)
- TAPE movie theme song: Let’s Tape (TBC)

== Publications ==
- Sweat Anita (2016)
- Anita Chui Keto Diet (2019)
