= Stars Academy season 2 =

Second season of Stars Academy

Stars Academy
- Season 2
- Hosted by: Sammy Leung
- Coaches: Vincy Chan; JW; Eric Kwok; Eman Lam; Phil Lam; Gin Lee; Alan Po; Hanjin Tan
- No. of contestants: 17 individuals and a 6-membered girl group
- Winner: Jasmine Yam
- Runner-up: Janees Wong
- Opening theme: "Surpass Myself" by all contestants
- No. of episodes: 15

Release
- Original network: TVB
- Original release: 11 June – 2 October 2022

Season chronology
- ← Previous; Stars Academy

Stars Academy is a Hong Kong singing competition television series to find young singing talents. The second season, also known as Stars Academy 2, premiered on 11 June 2022 and concluded on 2 October 2022, spanning 15 episodes. The competition followed a similar structure to the previous season, with individual and group performances and eliminations based on scores. Eric Kwok and Hanjin Tan served as coaching supervisors, alongside a team of coaches consisting of Vincy Chan, JW, Eman Lam, Phil Lam, Gin Lee, and Alan Po. Jasmine Yam was announced as the winner on 2 October 2022. Throughout the competition, Yam gained notable popularity, securing the top position on the audience popularity list for nine weeks. A post-competition live concert titled Prom Night was held on 1 November 2022 featured performances by most contestants, with a special appearance by Eric Kwok.

== Production ==
In July 2021, TVB initiated the audition process for the second season. Out of 1,000 applicants from both local and overseas, 23 contestants were selected, including 17 individuals and a 6-membered girl group. The members of the girl group, XiX, was initially introduced to the public through the youth talent singing show Stars Academy Juniors (2022). Investment of approximately 3,000 hours of training, including singing, dancing, nutrition, and make-up classes, was made, with a cost estimated at HKD $2 million per contestant. From April to June 2022, promotional activities for the show commenced, introducing the season's theme, "Surpass Myself". A music video and theme song with the same title were released. Its writing team included several contestants from the previous season–Aska Cheung, Archie Sin, Kaitlyn Lam, and Rock Ho–carrying the message of "passing the fire to the next generation".

The show retained Johnny Yim as the music director, and Sunny Wong served as the dance director. The set design was inspired by the Hong Kong Coliseum, featuring a 4-sided stage with motorised moving platforms and 5D hologram technology. The season premiered on 11 June, with the finale taking place on 2 October 2022. In addition to the Hong Kong region, TVB extended auditions and held smaller-scale singing competition shows in Malaysia and Australia. The winners from these shows eventually competed in Hong Kong against the winners from the domestic region in a friendly match. The match was featured in a two-special-episode spinoff programme titled Stars Academy 2 Kick-off Match, which concluded the Stars Academy 2 franchise in its entirety with its last airing date on 12 November 2022. The winner, Jasmine Yam, performed a live rendition of her tailor-made song "Breath Away", written by the season's coaching supervisors, Eric Kwok and Hanjin Tan, during this programme. (Note: The song was written and produced as a gift to the show's winner, being part of the winning prize. As of January 2024, the song has not yet been officially released.)

== Format and competition overview ==
Coaches of Stars Academy 2
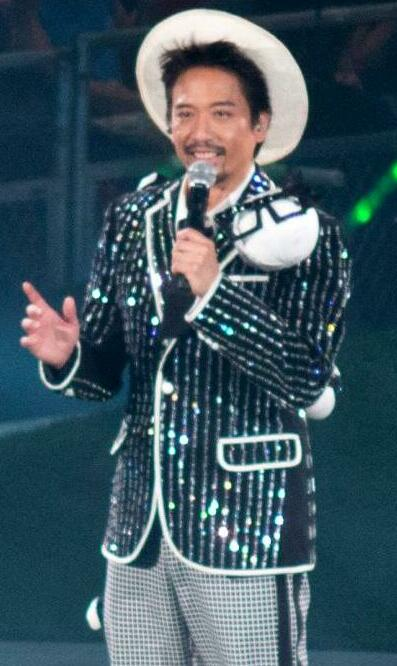
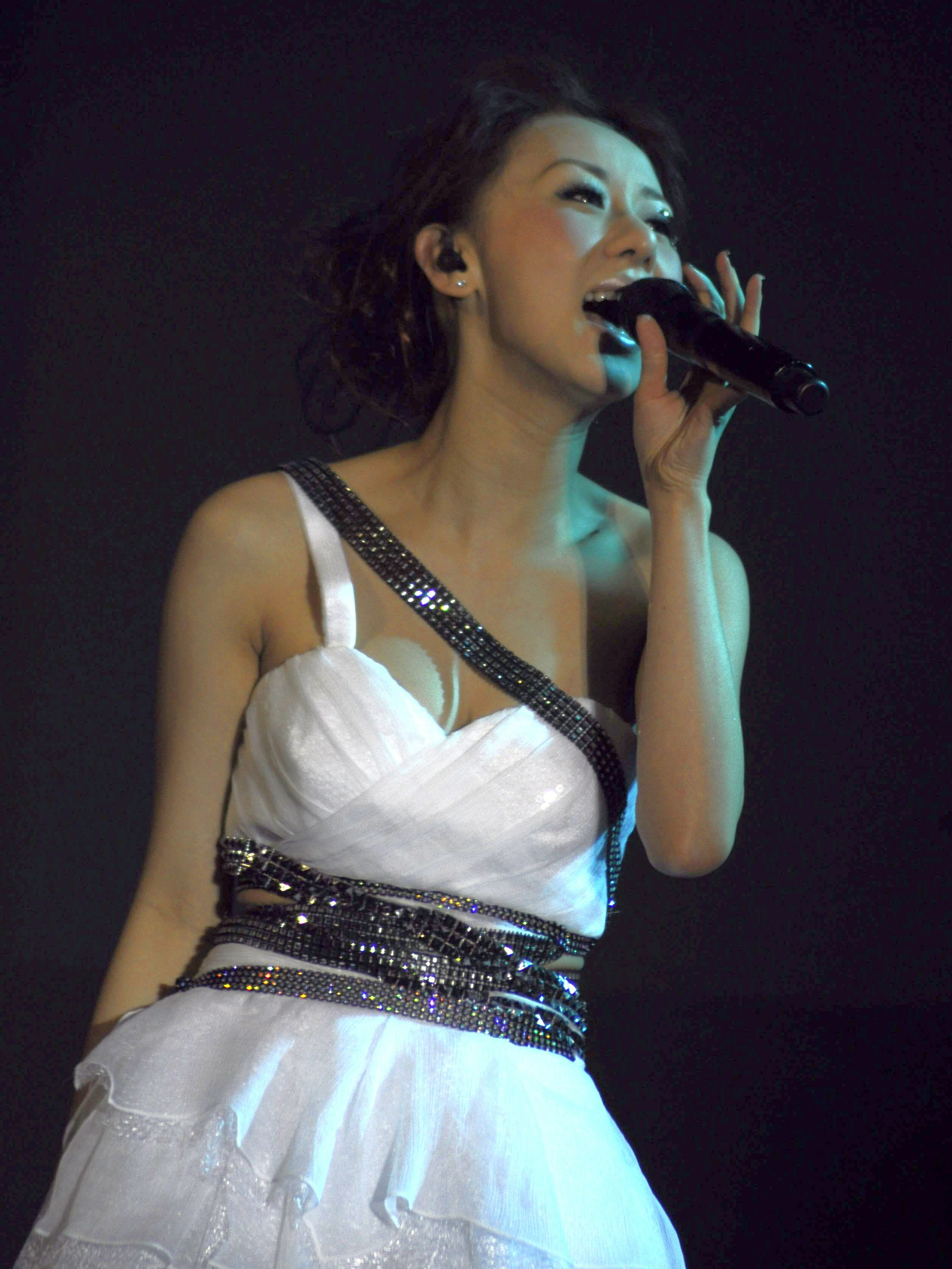
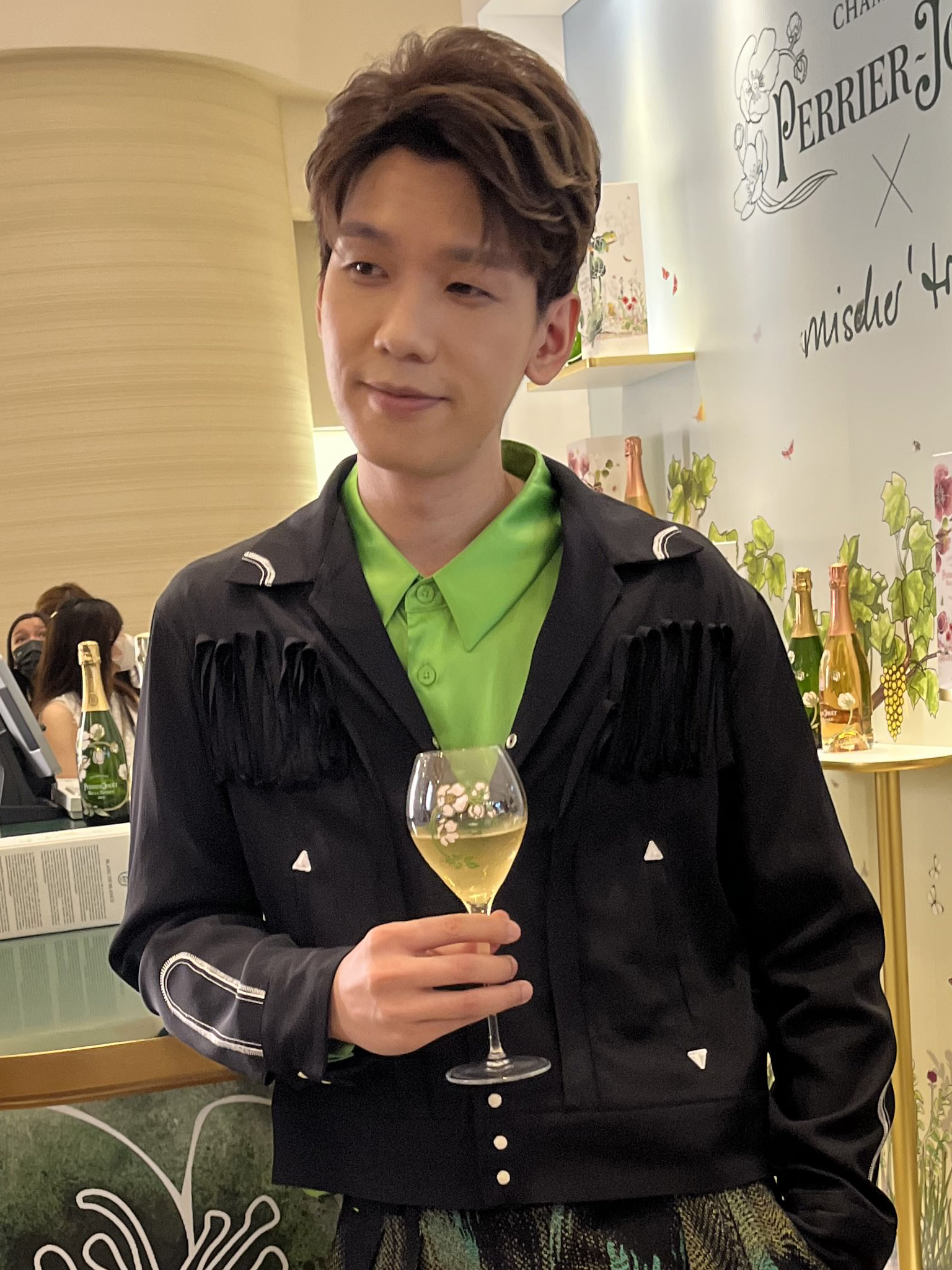
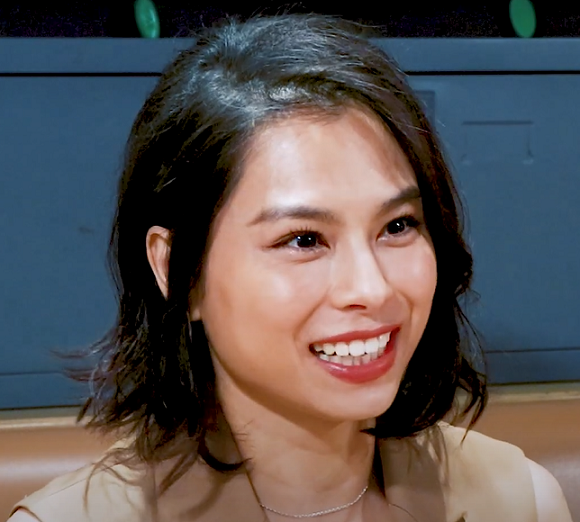
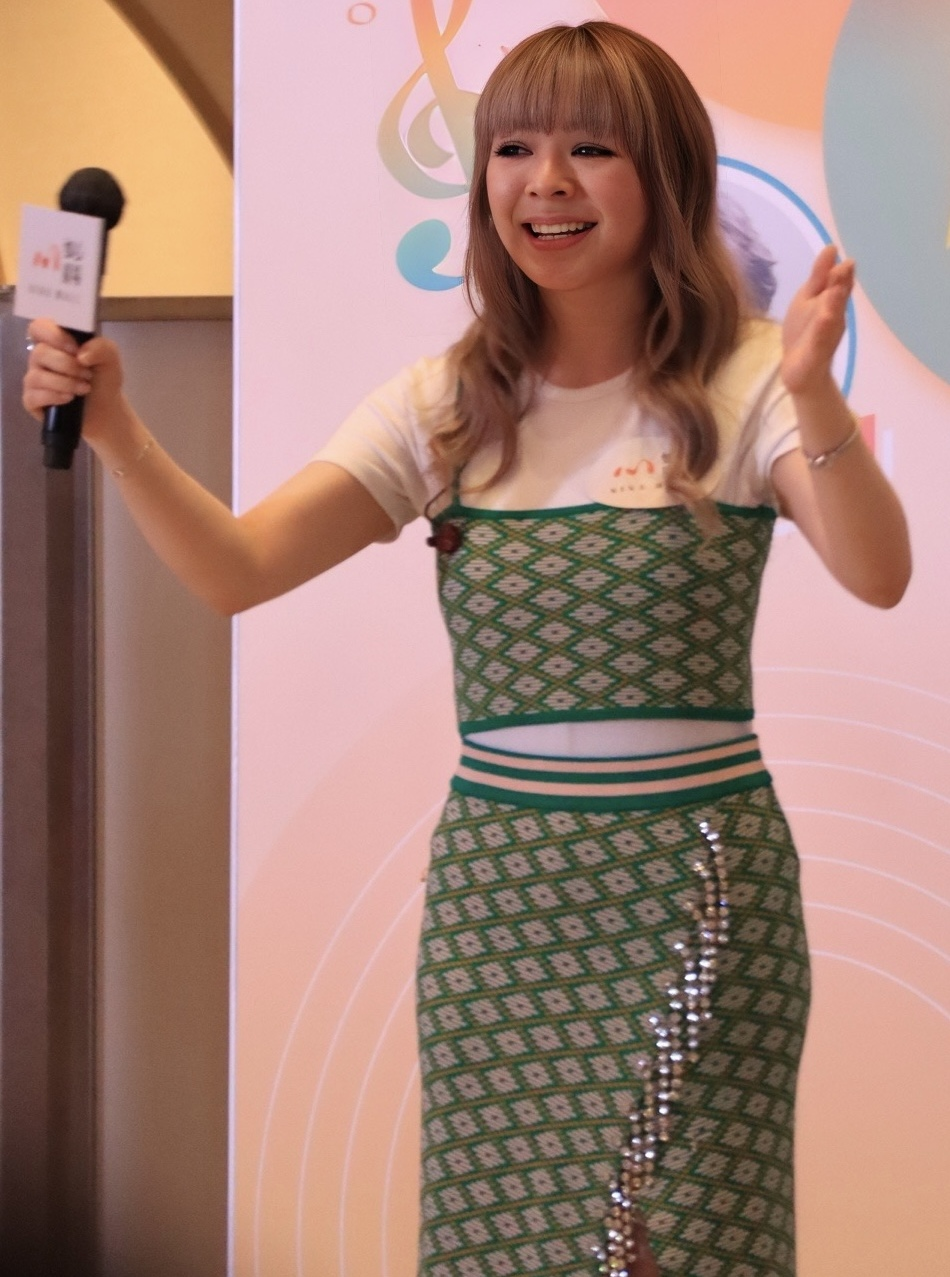
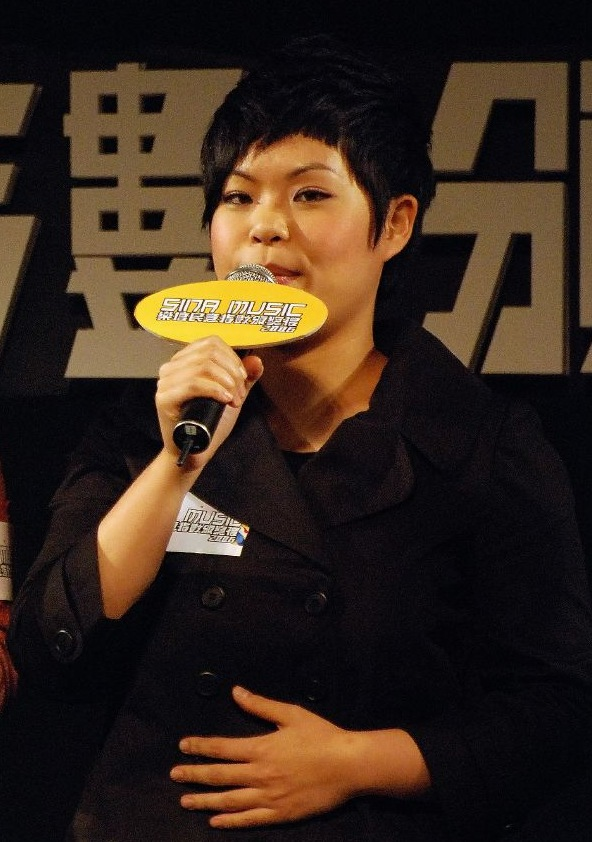
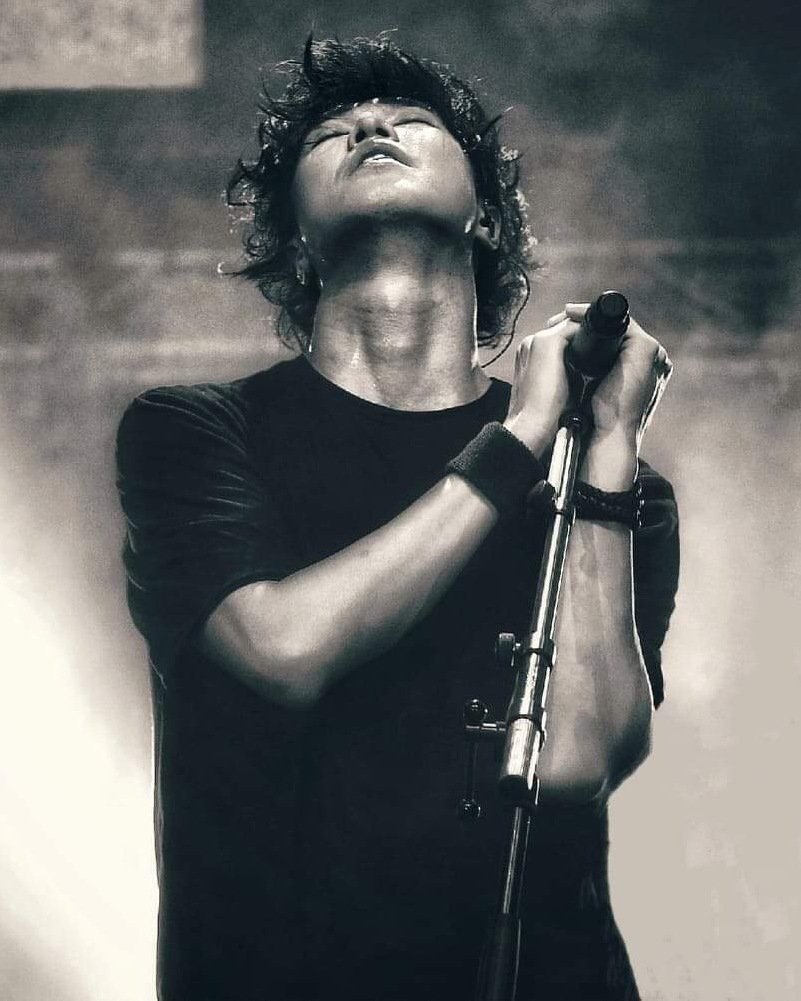
L–R, top: Eric Kwok (coaching supervisor), Vincy Chan, Phil Lam, Gin Lee
L–R, bottom: Hanjin Tan (coaching supervisor), JW, Eman Lam, Alan Po

The second season of the competition maintained the same basic structure as the previous one, but with some modifications. Like before, the competition consisted of multiple rounds, and apart from the live finale, the majority of the show was pre-recorded. Each round was typically broadcast within one, two, or three episodes. A panel of 25 professional music judges was also assembled for each round. Eric Kwok and Hanjin Tan, previously judges in the first season, were invited to become coaching supervisors for the second season.

The season began with Episode 1, introducing the contestants to the audience. In Episode 2, the contestants performed in groups of three or four, with the coaches selecting and forming their individual teams. For any contestants who faced the possibility of elimination after not being chosen, a second chance was given to showcase their talent individually. In Episodes 3–5, the contestants were divided into three groups of six. Each coach sent one of their contestants to compete in each group. Following the performances, three contestants who received the lowest score in each group were eliminated.

The remaining fifteen contestants were divided into two teams and competed against each other in the subsequent three rounds (Episodes 6–12). Under the leadership of Eric Kwok, the groups formed by Vincy Chan, Phil Lam, and Gin Lee composed the Red team. Hanjin Tan led the groups consisting of JW, Eman Lam, and Alan Po, forming the Blue team. Competing for a total cumulative score, the coaches of the losing team would disqualify one or two contestants according to the guidelines established for each round. In Episodes 6–8, the teams engaged in individual head-to-head battles. In Episodes 9–10, a concert-mode battle format was adopted, where both teams presented five sets of performances resembling those seen at a typical concert, including opening acts and encores. In Episodes 11–12, each contestant performed in pairs, either with a coach or another contestant from the same or opposite team.

Episodes 13–14 marked the return to individual competition for the top ten contestants, as they competed one-on-one for placement in the top five. The season finale, held on 2 October 2022 in Episode 15, utilized a scoring system that weighed both the judges' scores and audience votes equally. After the top five finalists performed, Jasmine Yam and Janees Wong emerged as the top two and faced off in a final round. Jasmine Yam ultimately claimed the winning title, earning a prize of HKD $100,000. Janees Wong placed as runner-up, with a prize of HKD $50,000, while Sabrina Chiu became the second runner up and received a prize of HKD $30,000.

== Contestants ==
- Jasmine Yam Hoi-ching (Note: Chinese: 任暟晴; Jyutping: Jam^{6} Hoi^{2}-cing^{4}) (age 16 on the show) gained attention for her emotional singing ability, shown in renditions including Leo Ku's "This Enjoyable Night" (歡樂今宵) and Jacky Cheung's "So Close Yet So Far" (這麼近那麼遠). Although not viewed as the best technical contestant, Yam was noted for having "an exceptional (脫俗) voice timbre and temperament" and considered promising for her age. (Note: The term 脫俗 is a Chinese expression that lacks a single perfect English translation due to its nuanced meaning. Instead, it can be interpreted in various ways, such as transcendent, otherworldly, refined, or ethereal, depending on the context. The word "exceptional" is used as an approximate translation.)
- Janees Wong Lok-yin (Note: Chinese: 黃洛妍; Jyutping: Wong^{4} Lok^{3}-jin^{4}) (age 25 on the show) received praise for her technically skilled performance of Vincy Chan's "Gutters" (溝渠暢泳).
- Sabrina Chiu Chi-lok (Note: Chinese: 趙紫諾; Jyutping: Ziu^{6} Zi^{2}-nok^{6}) (age 13 on the show) was noted for her powerful vocals, particularly in her performance of JC's "Be Apart" (說散就散).
- XiX (girl group) earned the "Outstanding Performance" Award for placing in top five.
  - Vici Chong Yan-yuet (Note: Chinese: 莊殷玥; Jyutping: Zong^{1} Jan^{1}-jyut^{6}) (age 14 on the show)
  - Aster Lau Chi-kwan (Note: Chinese: 劉芷君; Jyutping: Lau^{4} Zi^{2}-Gwan^{1}) (age 14 on the show)
  - Crystal Leung Sin-chi (Note: Chinese: 梁善知; Jyutping: Leong^{4} Sin^{6}-zi^{1}) (age 15 on the show)
  - Charlotte Mow Wan-hei (Note: Chinese: 繆昀希; Jyutping: Mau^{4} Wan^{4}-hei^{1}) (age 13 on the show)
  - Kiele Tang Xiao-yin (Note: Chinese: 鄧曉殷; Jyutping: Dang^{6} Hiu^{2}-jan^{1}) (age 15 on the show)
  - Caitlin Yang Bing-yi (Note: Chinese: 楊秉頤; Jyutping: Joeng^{4} Bing^{2}-ji^{1}) (age 14 on the show)
- Pamela Chiu Siu-ting (Note: Chinese: 趙小婷; Jyutping: Ziu^{6} Siu^{2}-ting^{4}) (age 21 on the show) earned the "Outstanding Performance" Award for placing in top five.
- Zayden Pang Ka-yin (Note: Chinese: 彭家賢; Jyutping: Paang^{4} Gaa^{1}-jin^{4}) (age 25 on the show)
- Angel Lau Wing-tung (Note: Chinese: 劉詠彤; Jyutping: Lau^{4} Wing^{6}-tung^{4}) (age 22 on the show) received the "Contestant with the Most Progress" Award along with Sean Wen.
- Maggie Chiu Chung-yee (Note: Chinese: 趙頌宜; Jyutping: Ziu^{6} Zung^{6}-ji^{4}) (age 19 on the show)
- Duncan How Chun-hei (Note: Chinese: 侯雋熙; Jyutping: Hau^{4} Zeon^{3}-hei^{1}) (age 26 on the show)
- Sean Wen Cho-hong (Note: Chinese: 文佐匡; Jyutping: Man^{4} Zo^{3}-hong^{1}) (age 22 on the show) received the "Contestant with the Most Progress" Award along with Angel Lau.
- Jason Chan Chun-hin (Note: Chinese: 陳晉軒; Jyutping: Can^{4} Zeon^{3}-hin^{1}) (age 27 on the show)
- Vivian Kong Ting-wai (Note: Chinese: 江廷慧; Jyutping: Gong^{1} Ting^{4}-wai^{6}) (age 26 on the show)
- Timothy Chan Ho-ting (Note: Chinese: 陳昊廷; Jyutping: Can^{4} Hou^{6}-ting^{4}) (age 21 on the show)
- Nicole Siu Ching-him (Note: Chinese: 蕭呈謙; Jyutping: Siu^{1} Cing^{4}-him^{1}) (age 17 on the show)
- Christopher Kim Wing-hang (Note: Chinese: 金永衡; Jyutping: Gam^{1} Wing^{5}-hang^{4}) (age 29 on the show)
- Mandy Suen Yee-man (Note: Chinese: 孫衣文; Jyutping: Syun^{1} Ji^{1}-man^{4}) (age 20 on the show)
- Desta Lee Yan-tung (Note: Chinese: 李茵彤; Jyutping: Lei^{5} Jan^{1}-tung^{4}) (age 22 on the show)
- Crystal Leung Tsz-ching (Note: Chinese: 梁芷菁; Jyutping: Leong^{4} Zi^{2}-zing^{1}) (age 17 on the show)

== Episode performances ==
* Song titles are loosely translated into English for better readability. Official Chinese song titles are indicated in parentheses.

Color key:

Red team contestant	Blue team contestant
This contestant advanced to next round.	This contestant was eliminated.
✔ Coach chose this contestant to be under their direct guidance.	This contestant was in the top two.
This contestant won Stars Academy.	This contestant was the runner-up.

=== Episode 1: Non-competition performances ===
Order	Contestant(s)	Song	Ref.
1	Group (Note: The performance featured appearances of some of the first season contestants.)	"Bohemian Rhapsody by Queen	
2	Vivian Kong	"The Last Blossom" (開到荼蘼) by Faye Wong	
3	Jason Chan	"I Love You" (愛很簡單) by David Tao	
4	Angel Lau	"Joyful" (心花怒放) by Joey Yung	
5	XiX	"Hard Life" (命硬) by Justin Lo	
6	Pamela Chiu	"I'm Really Hurt" (我真的受傷了) by Jacky Cheung	
7	Timothy Chan	"Love Too Late" (愛得太遲) by Leo Ku	
8	Sabrina Chiu	"Traitor" by Olivia Rodrigo	
9	Sean Wen	"Perfect" by Ed Sheeran	
10	Janees Wong	"The Greatest Love of All" by Whitney Houston	
11	Zayden Pang	"Who Is That" (那誰) by William So	
12	Maggie Chiu	"Breathing Is Hazardous" (呼吸有害) by Karen Mok	
13	Duncan How	"Wanderer" (任我行) by Eason Chan	
14	Christopher Kim	"Golden Era" (黃金時代) by Eason Chan	
15	Jasmine Yam	"One Plus One" (一加一) by AGA & Gin Lee	
16	Crystal Leung	"Born Second Grade" (天生二品) by Jace Chan	
17	Desta Lee	"Elegant and Vulgar" (雅俗) by Tang Siu Hau	
18	Mandy Suen	"Appointment" (約定) by Faye Wong	
19	Nicole Siu	"Over the Rainbow" by Judy Garland	
20	Group	"My Happy Time" (我的快樂時代) by Eason Chan	

=== Episode 2: Coaches' choices ===
Order	Contestant(s)	Song	Coach's choices						Ref.
Order	Contestant(s)	Song	Vincy Chan	J.W.	Eman Lam	Phil Lam	Gin Lee	Alan Po	Ref.
1	Duncan How	"Love Is Doubt" (愛是懷疑) by Eason Chan	—	—	—	—	—	✔	
1	Timothy Chan	"Love Is Doubt" (愛是懷疑) by Eason Chan	—	✔	—	—	—	—	
1	Jason Chan	"Love Is Doubt" (愛是懷疑) by Eason Chan	—	—	—	✔	—	—	
2	Crystal Leung	"Unfortunately My Star Sign Is Aquarius" (可惜我是水瓶座) by Miriam Yeung	✔	—	—	—	—	—	
2	Pamela Chiu	"Unfortunately My Star Sign Is Aquarius" (可惜我是水瓶座) by Miriam Yeung	—	✔	—	—	—	—	
2	Vivian Kong	"Unfortunately My Star Sign Is Aquarius" (可惜我是水瓶座) by Miriam Yeung	—	—	—	—	✔	—	
3	Christopher Kim	"Viva Alive" (活着VIVA) by Nicholas Tse	—	—	✔	—	—	—	
3	Maggie Chiu	"Viva Alive" (活着VIVA) by Nicholas Tse	—	—	—	—	—	—	
3	Zayden Pang	"Viva Alive" (活着VIVA) by Nicholas Tse	—	—	—	✔	—	—	
3	Sean Wen	"Viva Alive" (活着VIVA) by Nicholas Tse	✔	—	—	—	—	—	
4	Angel Lau	"So You Actually Don't Want Anything At All" (原來你甚麼都不要) by A-Mei	—	—	—	—	—	—	
4	Desta Lee	"So You Actually Don't Want Anything At All" (原來你甚麼都不要) by A-Mei	—	—	—	—	—	✔	
4	Janees Wong	"So You Actually Don't Want Anything At All" (原來你甚麼都不要) by A-Mei	—	✔	—	—	—	—	
4	Mandy Suen	"So You Actually Don't Want Anything At All" (原來你甚麼都不要) by A-Mei	—	—	—	—	✔	—	
5	Sabrina Chiu	"Poker Face" by Lady Gaga	—	—	—	✔	—	—	
5	Nicole Siu	"Poker Face" by Lady Gaga	—	—	✔	—	—	—	
5	Jasmine Yam	"Poker Face" by Lady Gaga	—	—	—	—	✔	—	
5	XiX (Note: Member Aster Lau competed as the representative contestant on behalf of the group. XiX later performed "Candy Ball" by As One as a whole group during the featured episode.)	"Poker Face" by Lady Gaga	✔	—	—	—	—	—	
2nd chance	Angel Lau	"Pretty Crazy" by Joey Yung	—	—	—	—	—	✔	
2nd chance	Maggie Chiu	"Season of the Wind" (風的季節) by Paula Tsui	—	—	✔	—	—	—	

=== Episodes 3–5 ===
Order	Contestant	Coach	Song	Score	Result	Ref.
1	Pamela Chiu	J.W.	"The Root of Love" (愛的根源) by Alan Tam	17	Advanced	
2	Jasmine Yam	Gin Lee	"Jade Butterfly" (玉蝴蝶) by Nicholas Tse	19	Advanced	
3	Christopher Kim	Eman Lam	"Morning Train" (早班火車) by Beyond	16	Advanced	
4	Angel Lau	Alan Po	"Shinning" (發熱發亮) by Sammi Cheng	13	Advanced	
5	Sabrina Chiu	Phil Lam	"Be Apart" (說散就散) by JC	23	Advanced	
6	Crystal Leung	Vincy Chan	"I Wish" by Jace Chan	8	Eliminated	
7	Sean Wen	Vincy Chan	"Why You Gonna Lie" by OSN	19	Advanced	
8	Zayden Pang	Phil Lam	"Love and Sincerity" (愛與誠) by Leo Ku	23	Advanced	
9	Desta Lee	Alan Po	"Overpowered" (屈機) by Panther Chan	8	Eliminated	
10	Nicole Siu	Eman Lam	"You Raise Me Up" by Secret Garden	14	Advanced	
11	Vivian Kong	Gin Lee	"Dangerous Woman" by Ariana Grande	22	Advanced	
12	Timothy Chan	J.W.	"Lies Between Us" (你瞞我瞞) by Jason Chan	16	Advanced	
13	Duncan How	Alan Po	"Endlessly" (綿綿) by Eason Chan	17	Advanced	
14	XiX	Vincy Chan	Me Gusta Tu by GFriend	23	Advanced	
15	Mandy Suen	Gin Lee	"Tears" (眼淚) by Mavis Fan	14	Eliminated	
16	Maggie Chiu	Eman Lam	"You Are the Only One in My Heart" (我的心裏只有你沒有他) by Tiger Huang	22	Advanced	
17	Jason Chan	Phil Lam	"Pillow Talk" (記憶棉) by MC Cheung	21	Advanced	
18	Janees Wong	J.W.	"Leave the Keys Behind" (留低鎖匙) by Hins Cheung	23	Advanced	

=== Episodes 6–8: First team battles ===
Order	Contestant	Song	Score (Note: Red team won with a cumulative score 109-91.)	Ref.
1	Vivian Kong	"Crescent Bay" (月牙灣) by F.I.R.	9	
1	Pamela Chiu	"Soul Recognition" (靈魂相認) by Hins Cheung	16	
2	Jasmine Yam	"3 A.M." by AGA	9	
2	Angel Lau	"Let It Be Gone With the Wind" (讓一切隨風) by Kenny Bee	16	
3	Duncan How	"Trust Yourself" (信自己) by Alex To & Sally Yeh	5	
3	XiX (Note: XiX split into a 4-membered dance group and a 2-membered vocal group for this round. This dance performance was performed by members Aster Lau, Charlotte Mow, Crystal Leung, and Vici Chong.)	"Superpower" (超能力) by G.E.M.	20	
4	Maggie Chiu	"Hard To Love" (我不好愛) by Eason Chan	17	
4	Jason Chan	"Red Scarf" (如果可以) by William Wei	8	
5	Sabrina Chiu	"Hostage" (人質) by A-Mei	8	
5	Timothy Chan	"Rubbish" (垃圾) by Candy Lo	17	
6	Nicole Siu	"Encountered" (偶遇) by Samantha Lam	4	
6	Sean Wen	"Ice Ice Baby" by Vanilla Ice	21	
7	Christopher Kim	"Toxic" by Britney Spears	7	
7	XiX (Note: XiX split into a 4-membered dance group and a 2-membered vocal group for this round. This performance was performed by members Caitlin Yang and Kiele Tang.)	"If I Ain't Got You" by Alicia Keys	18	
8	Janees Wong	"Lady Marmalade" by Labelle	9	
8	Zayden Pang	"Always Stay Young" (青春常駐) by Hins Cheung	16	

Team formation and result
Red team		Blue team	
Jason Chan	Advanced	Timothy Chan	Advanced
Sabrina Chiu	Advanced	Maggie Chiu	Advanced
Vivian Kong	Advanced	Pamela Chiu	Advanced
Zayden Pang	Advanced	Duncan How	Advanced
Sean Wen	Advanced	Christopher Kim	Eliminated
XiX	Advanced	Angel Lau	Advanced
Jasmine Yam	Advanced	Nicole Siu	Advanced
		Janees Wong	Advanced

=== Episodes 9–10: Second team battles (concert-mode) ===
Order	Contestant(s)	Song(s)	Score (Note: Red team won with a cumulative score 64-61.)	Ref.
Opening	Jason Chan, Sabrina Chiu, Zayden Pang, Sean Wen, XiX	"Why Do We Dream" (天才與白痴) by Sam Hui "Uptown Funk" by Bruno Mars	15	
Opening	Maggie Chiu, Pamela Chiu, Angel Lau, Janees Wong	"Exaggerated" (浮誇) by Eason Chan	10	
Song of the Year	Janees Wong	"Words of Love Still Unspoken" (情深說話未曾講) by Leon Lai	9	
Song of the Year	Jasmine Yam	"This Enjoyable Night" (歡樂今宵) by Leo Ku	16	
Power Medley	Jason Chan, Vivian Kong, Sean Wen, XiX, Jasmine Yam	"In the Lasers" (激光中) by Roman Tam "Dynamite" by BTS "Flow Not Fly" (流非飛) by Faye Wong	16	
Power Medley	Timothy Chan, Duncan How, Angel Lau, Nicole Siu	"Stop Fooling Around" (拒絕再玩) by Leslie Cheung "Bad Girl" (壞女孩) by Anita Mui "Trouble Maker" by Trouble Maker	9	
Duet with a Guest Star (Note: The first season contestants, Kaitlyn Lam and Yumi Chung, were invited as guest stars to perform.)	Maggie Chiu, Kaitlyn Lam	"Black Tangerine" (黑色柳丁) by David Tao	16	
Duet with a Guest Star	Sabrina Chiu, Yumi Chung	"Dancing Diva" (舞孃) by Jolin Tsai	9	
Encore	All Red Team contestants	"We Will Rock You" "We Are the Champions" by Queen	8	
Encore	All Blue Team contestants	"A Million Dreams" by Ziv Zaifman, Hugh Jackman, Michelle Williams "Youth Anthem" (青春頌) by Alfred Hui	17	

Team formation and result
Red team		Blue team	
Jason Chan	Advanced	Timothy Chan	Eliminated
Sabrina Chiu	Advanced	Maggie Chiu	Advanced
Vivian Kong	Advanced	Pamela Chiu	Advanced
Zayden Pang	Advanced	Duncan How	Advanced
Sean Wen	Advanced	Angel Lau	Advanced
XiX	Advanced	Nicole Siu	Eliminated
Jasmine Yam	Advanced	Janees Wong	Advanced

=== Episodes 11–12: Third team battles ===
Order	Contestant with a coach or another contestant	Song(s)	Score (Note: Blue team won with a cumulative score 89-61.)	Ref.
1	Sean Wen, Vincy Chan	"Love Is Like A Tide" (愛如潮水) by Jeff Chang	7	
1	Angel Lau, Alan Po	"Network Security Hazard" (網絡安全隱患) by Serrini	18	
2	Maggie Chiu, Eman Lam	"To Forget Him" (忘記他) by Teresa Teng	12	
2	Sabrina Chiu, Gin Lee	"First Tear Last Salute" (先哭為敬) by Joyce Cheng	13	
3	Jason Chan, Vivian Kong	"Caution Wet Floor" (小心地滑) by MC Cheung	4	
3	Janees Wong, Pamela Chiu	"Still" (依然) by Sandy Lam	21	
4	Duncan How, JW	"You're the Most Precious" (你最珍貴) by Jacky Cheung, Francesca Kao	9	
4	Zayden Pang, Phil Lam	"Andersen’s Fault" (安徒生的錯) by Phil Lam	16	
5	Jasmine Yam	"Fond of You" (喜歡你) "Lover" (情人) by Beyond	14	
5	Pamela Chiu	"Fond of You" (喜歡你) "Lover" (情人) by Beyond	11	
6	Janees Wong, Hanjin Tan	"Close Eye Attentively" (閉目入神) by Ronald Cheng	18	
6	XiX, Eric Kwok	"Heavy Taste" (重口味) by Eason Chan	7	

Team formation and result
Red team		Blue team	
Jason Chan	Eliminated	Maggie Chiu	Advanced
Sabrina Chiu	Advanced	Pamela Chiu	Advanced
Vivian Kong	Eliminated	Duncan How	Advanced
Zayden Pang	Advanced	Angel Lau	Advanced
Sean Wen	Advanced	Janees Wong	Advanced
XiX	Advanced		
Jasmine Yam	Advanced		

=== Episodes 13–14: Top Five placement ===
Order	Contestant	Song	Score	Result	Ref.
1	Sean Wen	"Can't Stop the Feeling!" by Justin Timberlake	5	Eliminated	
1	Jasmine Yam	"So Close Yet So Far" (這麼近那麼遠) by Jacky Cheung	20	Advanced	
2	Duncan How	"Love You" (愛你) by Andy Hui	0	Eliminated	
2	Sabrina Chiu	"Rolling in the Deep" by Adele	25	Advanced	
3	Angel Lau	"Legend of a Hungry Wolf" (餓狼傳說) by Jacky Cheung	6	Eliminated	
3	XiX	"Nobody" by Wonder Girls	19	Advanced	
4	Maggie Chiu	"Schizophrenia" (精神分裂) by Julia Wu	6	Eliminated	
4	Pamela Chiu	"Lightbulb" (電燈膽) by Stephy Tang	19	Advanced	
5	Zayden Pang	"Aspirin" (阿士匹靈) by Eason Chan	2	Eliminated	
5	Janees Wong	"Gutters" (溝渠暢泳) by Vincy Chan	23	Advanced	

=== Episode 15: Finale ===
Order	Contestant	Song	Score (Note: The outcome was determined through the aggregation of scores from both the judges and the audience votes.)	Result	Ref.
1	Janees Wong	"Listen to the Sea" (聽海) by A-Mei	22.93%	Top two	
2	Pamela Chiu	"Scent" (味道) by Winnie Hsin	9.886%	Fifth place	
3	XiX	"@princejoyce" by Joyce Cheng	16.83%	Fourth place	
4	Sabrina Chiu	"I Want Us to Be Together" (我要我們在一起) by Mavis Fan	19.53%	Third place	
5	Jasmine Yam	"I've Waited Until the Flowers Withered" (我等到花兒也謝了) by Jacky Cheung	20.4%	Top two	
Second round
6	Janees Wong	"Bad Boy" by A-Mei	42.71%	Runner-up	
7	Jasmine Yam	"Crazy" (瘋了) by Sandy Lam	43.28%	Winner	

== Elimination chart ==
Color key:

Winner	Runner-up	Third place
Advanced as an individual contestant	Advanced as part of the Red team	Advanced as part of the Blue team
Eliminated as an individual contestant	Eliminated as part of the Red team	Eliminated as part of the Blue team

Contestant	Episode 1	Episode 2	Episode 3–5	Episode 6–8	Episode 9–10	Episode 11–12	Episode 13–14	Finale
Jasmine Yam	Advanced	Advanced	Advanced	Advanced	Advanced	Advanced	Advanced	Winner
Janees Wong	Advanced	Advanced	Advanced	Advanced	Advanced	Advanced	Advanced	Runner-up
Sabrina Chiu	Advanced	Advanced	Advanced	Advanced	Advanced	Advanced	Advanced	Third place
XiX	Advanced	Advanced	Advanced	Advanced	Advanced	Advanced	Advanced	Eliminated
Pamela Chiu	Advanced	Advanced	Advanced	Advanced	Advanced	Advanced	Advanced	Eliminated
Zayden Pang	Advanced	Advanced	Advanced	Advanced	Advanced	Advanced	Eliminated	
Maggie Chiu	Advanced	Advanced	Advanced	Advanced	Advanced	Advanced	Eliminated	
Angel Lau	Advanced	Advanced	Advanced	Advanced	Advanced	Advanced	Eliminated	
Duncan How	Advanced	Advanced	Advanced	Advanced	Advanced	Advanced	Eliminated	
Sean Wen	Advanced	Advanced	Advanced	Advanced	Advanced	Advanced	Eliminated	
Vivian Kong	Advanced	Advanced	Advanced	Advanced	Advanced	Eliminated		
Jason Chan	Advanced	Advanced	Advanced	Advanced	Advanced	Eliminated		
Nicole Siu	Advanced	Advanced	Advanced	Advanced	Eliminated			
Timothy Chan	Advanced	Advanced	Advanced	Advanced	Eliminated			
Christopher Kim	Advanced	Advanced	Advanced	Eliminated				
Mandy Suen	Advanced	Advanced	Eliminated					
Desta Lee	Advanced	Advanced	Eliminated					
Crystal Leung	Advanced	Advanced	Eliminated					

== Reception and ratings ==
Besides the final audience vote, which contributed directly to the finale score, the show also kept track of viewers' favorites through a weekly online popularity list. Throughout the season, Jasmine Yam dominated the list, securing the top spot for nine consecutive weeks and solidifying her status as one of the most popular contestants. Among the most viewed on YouTube, Sabrina Chiu's performances took the lead, with Jasmine Yam closely following in second place. Notably, Yam's rendition of Sandy Lam's "Crazy" (瘋了), performed during the finale, stood out as the only performance to trend at the number one spot on YouTube's local Hot Trending list. The finale reached its peak viewership with 1.16 million viewers.

Episode (Note: The TV ratings for episodes 7–12 are not available due to TVB no longer announcing the ratings figures on a weekly basis.)	Airing date	Viewership rating (Note: According to Hong Kong's Nielsen TV ratings system, each rating point represents about 64,200 viewers.)	Ref.
1	11 June 2022	12.1 points	
2	18 June 2022	11.1 points	
3	25 June 2022	12.5 points	
4	2 July 2022	13.8 points	
5	9 July 2022	12.7 points	
6	23 July 2022	11.6 points	
13	17 September 2022	16.4 points	
14	24 September 2022	16 points	
Finale	2 October 2022	17.9 points	

== Post-competition ==
Prom Night was a live concert showcasing all the contestants, with the exception of Maggie Chiu and Nicole Siu, who were absent due to their personal reasons. The event took place on 1 November 2022, at MacPherson Stadium. The setlist primarily consisted of songs previously performed by the contestants during the singing competition. As a special addition, Eric Kwok made a guest appearance as a performer.

In May 2023, Aster Lau left the girl group XiX to pursue a solo career under All About Music. The remaining five members of XiX signed a record deal with Universal Music Hong Kong and made their official debut in September 2023. In May 2025, Janees Wong released her first single "Work of Art" (我們都是藝術品) under All About Music.

== Releases ==
- Group – "Surpass Myself" (我超越我, 2022) – Stars Academy 2 theme song
- Group – "Hat Trick" (2022) – featuring the first season contestants
- Group – "Stars of Joy" (2022)

== Awards and nominations ==
Year	Award	Category	Nominated work	Result	Ref.
2022	AEG Entertainment Popularity	Best Variety Programme	Stars Academy 2	Won	
2022	TVB Anniversary Awards	Best Variety Programme	Stars Academy 2	Nominated	
2022	TVB Anniversary Awards	Best TV Themesong	"Surpass Myself"	Nominated	
