= Siu Yam-yam =

Hong Kong actress

- Chinese: 邵音音
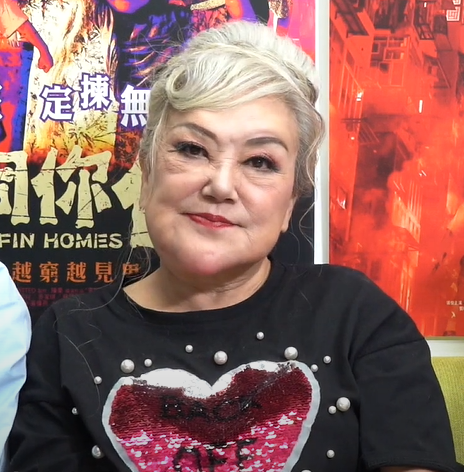
- Shaw attending the interview for the film Coffin Homes (鬼同你住) in 2021.
- Born: Ngai Siu-ngan (Chinese: 倪小雁); 17 August 1950 (age 75); Kwong Wah Hospital, Yau Ma Tei, Yau Tsim Mong District, Hong Kong
- Other names: Susan Shaw, Susan Siu, Shao Yin-Yin, Shao Yinyin
- Occupation: Actress
- Years active: 1974–2020

Siu Yam-yam (Chinese: 邵音音, born 17 August 1950), born Ngai Siu-ngan (倪小雁), is a Hong Kong actress. She has been active in the Hong Kong film industry since 1970.

== Filmography ==
- The Calling of a Bus Driver (2019)
- A Journey of Happiness (2019)
- Missbehavior (2019)
- A Lifetime Treasure (2019)
- Dearest Anita (2019)
- Hotel Soul Good (2018)
- Special Region (2018)
- Undercover vs. Undercover (2018)
- Lucid Dreams (2018)
- A Beautiful Moment (2018)
- Vampire Cleanup Department (2017)
- Happiness (2016)
- Lazy Hazy Crazy (2015)
- Are You Here (2015)
- Full Strike (2015)
- Two Thumbs Up (2015)
- King of Mahjong (2015)
- As the Light Goes Out (2014)
- The Best Plan Is No Plan (2013)
- Hardcore Comedy (2013)
- Tales from the Dark 1 (2013)
- SDU: Sex Duties Unit (2013)
- Hotel Deluxe (2013)
- I Love Hong Kong 2013 (2013)
- Vulgaria (2012)
- I Love Hong Kong 2012 (2012)
- ICAC Investigators 2011 (2011)
- I Love Hong Kong (2011)
- Merry-Go-Round (2010)
- Frozen (2010)
- Gallants (2010)
- True Women For Sale (2009)
- Dongfang muqin (1997)

Chinatown Kid (1977)

- Confession of a Concubine (1976)
- Love Swindlers (1976)
