= Johnny Yim =

Hong Kong pianist, composer, arranger and producer (born 1977)

- 嚴勵行
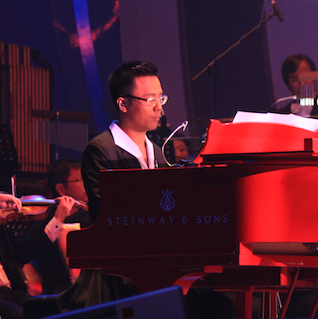
- Yim in 2011
- Pronunciation: Yim Lai-hang
- Born: 12 August 1977 (age 49); British Hong Kong
- Education: York University
- Occupations: Pianist; composer; arranger; producer
- Years active: 2004 - present

Chinese name
- Traditional Chinese: 嚴勵行
- Simplified Chinese: 严励行
Transcriptions
Standard Mandarin
- Hanyu Pinyin: Yán Lì-xíng
Yue: Cantonese
- Jyutping: Jim^{4} Lai^{6}-hang^{4}
- Website: Official Website

Johnny Yim Lai-hang (Note: Chinese: 嚴勵行; Jyutping: Jim^{4} Lai^{6}-hang^{4}) (born 12 August 1977) is a Hong Kong pianist, composer, arranger, and producer.

== Life and career ==
Yim was born in Hong Kong, coming from a family with a musical background, with one parent a musician and the other a dance choreographer. He has a sister named Alice. Yim's journey in music began at the age of six when he started learning the piano. While growing up in Canada, he pursued a major in Mathematics at York University and didn't consider a formal music degree due to concerns about making a living. However, his passion for music remained strong, leading him to embark on a self-study path. Upon returning to Hong Kong, Yim achieved his first milestone by winning the 16th C.A.S.H. Songwriting Quest in 2004, which served as a catalyst for his music career. Since then, Yim has worked with numerous artists, including Alan Tam, Hins Cheung, Gigi Leung, Hacken Lee, AGA, Joyce Cheng, Alfred Hui. In 2017, Yim founded the Gsus Music Ministry, an initiative dedicated to promoting Cantonese Christian music.

In 2021, Yim took on the role of music director for TVB's singing competition Stars Academy (2021–2022). Throughout his career, he has crafted over hundreds of arranged pieces, earning him the moniker of "Arrangement Knight" (編曲俠).

== Representative works ==
* Song titles are loosely translated into English for better readability. Official Chinese song titles are indicated in parentheses.

- Raymond Lam – "If the Time Comes" (如果時間來到) – 2009
- G.E.M – "Sleeping Beauty" (睡公主) – 2009
- Hins Cheung – "P.S. I Love You" – 2011
- Alfred Hui – "Youth Anthem" (青春頌) – 2012
- Jinny Ng – "Love is Not Easy" (越難越愛) – 2014
- Hins Cheung – "Forever Young" (青春常駐) – 2014
- Hana Kuk – "Forget Myself" (忘記我自己) – 2017
- AGA – "Tonight" – 2019
- Hubert Wu – "Mortals Don't Know About Love" (凡人不懂愛) – 2020
- Forever Young at Heart OST – 2022
- Hins Cheung – "Imaginary Fairground" (隱形遊樂場) – 2023
- AYO Alumni Taiwan - "Hand In Hand" (手牽手) – 2024

== Filmography ==
=== Television shows ===
Year	Title	Role	Notes	Ref.
2021	Stars Academy	Himself	Music director	
2021	Forever Young at Heart	Himself	Cameo	
2022	Stars Academy 2	Himself	Music director	

== Awards and nominations ==
- Only major music awards are included per List of Hong Kong music awards. Most music nominations are excluded due to the lack of reliable sources.

Year	Award	Category	Nominated work	Results	Ref.
2009	Jade Solid Gold Awards	Best Arranger	"If Times Comes" (如果時間來到) (sung by Raymond Lam)	Won	
2012	Top Ten Chinese Gold Songs Award	Top Ten Songs (as a composer)	"P.S. I Love You" (sung by Hins Cheung)	Won	
2012	Jade Solid Gold Awards	Best Producer	"Vaccination" (預防針 (sung by Linda Chung)	Won	
2014	Ultimate Song Chart Awards	Best Arranger	Himself	Won	
2015	Top Ten Chinese Gold Songs Award	Top Ten Songs (as a composer)	"Forever Young" (青春常駐) (sung by Hins Cheung)	Won	
2023	Metro Radio Music Awards	Top Streaming Song (as a composer)	"Imaginary Fairground" (隱形遊樂場) (sung by Hins Cheung)	Won	
