= Special Female Force =

2016 Hong Kong film by Wilson Chin

- Traditional Chinese: 辣警霸王花
- Jyutping: laat6 ging2 baa3 wong4 faa1
- Directed by: Wilson Chin
- Produced by: Charlie Wong, Chimmey Chan, Kwong Kwan-Yin, Stanley Law, Paco Wong
- Starring: Eliza Sam; Joyce Cheng; Anita Chui
- Production company: Sun Entertainment Culture Limited
- Release date: 13 October 2016
- Running time: 105 minutes
- Countries: Hong Kong, Malaysia
- Language: Cantonese

Special Female Force is a 2016 Hong Kong action comedy film directed by Wilson Chin and starring Eliza Sam, Joyce Cheng and Tong Bing Yu.

== Plot ==
After her mother was killed during a mission twenty years ago in Thailand, Fa (Eliza Sam) decides to join the police academy in Hong Kong where she meets 5 new friends played by Anita Chui, Cathryn Lee, Mandy Ho, Joyce Cheng and Jeana Ho. Failing to graduate, the six women are given the opportunity to join a formerly disbanded all-female elite force to hunt down terrorist Gu Zhi Jin, the man who killed Fa's mother. The group of female agents led by a friend of Fa's mother go undercover in Malaysia.

== Cast ==
The six members of the special force:

- Eliza Sam
- Anita Chui
- Cathryn Lee
- Mandy Ho
- Joyce Cheng
- Jeana Ho

Supporting Cast

- Chris Tang
- Jacky Cai
- Tong Bing Yu
- Stephy Tang
- Aaron Aziz
- Jessica Cambensy
