= I Love Hong Kong 2013 =

2013 Hong Kong film by Chung Shu-kai

- Traditional Chinese: 2013我愛HK 恭喜發財
- Simplified Chinese: 2013我爱HK 恭喜发财
- Hanyu Pinyin: Èr Líng Yī Sān Wǒ Ài HK Gōng Xǐ Fā Cái
- Jyutping: Ji6 Ling4 Jat1 Saam1 Ngo5 Ngoi3 HK Gung1 Hei2 Faat3 Coi4
- Directed by: Chung Shu Kai
- Written by: Peter Chik; Kwok Kin Lok; Yan Pak Wing; Chiu Sin Hang
- Produced by: Eric Tsang; Peter Chik
- Starring: Alan Tam; Veronica Yip; Natalis Chan; Eric Tsang; Stanley Fung; Bosco Wong; Michael Tse; Kate Tsui; Joyce Cheng
- Cinematography: Ko Chiu Lam
- Edited by: Wenders Li; Mok Man Ho
- Music by: Tang Chi Wah; Benedict Chong
- Production companies: Shaw Brothers Studio; Television Broadcasts Limited
- Distributed by: Intercontinental Film Distributors (H.K.)
- Release date: 7 February 2013
- Running time: 110 minutes
- Country: Hong Kong
- Language: Cantonese
- Box office: HK$16,894,784.

I Love Hong Kong 2013 is a 2013 Hong Kong comedy film and the third film of the I Love Hong Kong film series. Film stars Alan Tam, Veronica Yip, Natalis Chan and Eric Tsang, who also served as producer. This is also Veronica Yip's first film role since 1996's Hong Kong Showgirls. The film was released on 7 February 2013 to celebrate Chinese New Year.

== Cast ==
=== Main cast ===
Cast	Role	Description
Alan Tam	Sung Chi Hung 宋池雄	Tea house owner Mei Yeung Yeung's husband Ha Sek Sam's good friend and love rival Helped by Angel
Bosco Wong (Youth)	Sung Chi Hung 宋池雄	Tea house owner Mei Yeung Yeung's husband Ha Sek Sam's good friend and love rival Helped by Angel
Veronica Yip	Mei Yeung Yeung 美洋洋	Mei Lung Kwat's daughter Sung Chi Hung's wife Chu Yuk Yuen's good friend
Kate Tsui (Youth)	Mei Yeung Yeung 美洋洋	Mei Lung Kwat's daughter Sung Chi Hung's wife Chu Yuk Yuen's good friend
Natalis Chan	Ha Sek Sam 夏石森	Tim Sam Corporation chairman Sung Chi Hung's good friend and love rival Pursues Mei Yeung Yeung; Chu Yuk Yuen's love interest
Michael Tse (Youth)	Ha Sek Sam 夏石森	Tim Sam Corporation chairman Sung Chi Hung's good friend and love rival Pursues Mei Yeung Yeung; Chu Yuk Yuen's love interest
Eric Tsang	Angel 天使	Second tier angel Promoted to first tier angel after helping Sung Chi Hung

=== Other cast ===
Cast	Role	Description
Stanley Fung		
Joyce Cheng	Chu Yuk Yuen 朱玉圓	Mei Yeung Yeung's good friend Loves Ha Sek Sam
Wong Cho-lam		
Benz Hui	Mei Lung Kwat 美龍骨	Mei Yeung Yeung's father
Anthony Chan		
Benette Pang (彭健新)		
Danny Yip (葉智強)		
Tin Kai-Man		1970s tea house cook
Alfred Cheung		
Daniel Chau (周志康)		Tea house customer
Natalie Meng (孟瑤)	So Pik 蘇碧	Dim sum girl
Elvina Kong		
Evergreen Mak Cheung-ching		
Jerry Koo (古明華)		1970s tea house team leader
Jacqueline Chong		1970s tea house team leader
Lai Lok-yi		1970s tea house team leader
Pang Wai On (彭懷安)	Caustic 哥士的	1970s tea house electrician Restroom department manager
Wong Chi On (王志安)		1970s tea house second chef
Ngo Ka-nin	Fadan Wong 花旦王	Cantonese opera fadan
Samantha Ko	Cho Cho 楚楚	1970s porn star Has a son
Lo Fan (魯芬)		1970s tea house manager
Lo Fu (路芙)		1970s tea house manager
Kayi Cheung		
Koni Lui		
6-Wing (陸永)		
English Tang (鄧英敏)		
Akina Hong (康華)		
Wilson Chin (錢國偉)		
David Lo (盧大偉)		
Siu Yam-yam		
Gill Mohindepaul Singh		
Bob Lam (林盛斌)		
Ng Wan Po (吳雲甫)		
Alan Wan (溫家偉)		
Andrew Lam (林敏驄)		
Tony Ho (何華超)		
Yuen Ching Fung (阮政峰)		
Yiu Ping (姚兵)		
Yung Kai Nei (翁佳妮)		
Terence Siufay		
Joe Junior		
Susan Tse		
Celine Ma (馬蹄露)		
William Chak		
Sammi Cheung (張秀文)		
Mixe Lee (李家聰)		

== Reception ==
Andrew Chan of the Film Critics Circle of Australia writes, "One of the reasons why "I Love Hong Kong 2013″ works, is because it touches upon relevant Hong Kong people concerns and the sentimental value that people place on long lost Hong Kong culture in the rapidly changing territory. "

I Love Hong Kong 2013 earned HK$16,894,784 at the Hong Kong box office.
