= Hungry Ghost Ritual =

2014 Hong Kong-Malaysian film by Nick Cheung

- Directed by: Nick Cheung
- Produced by: Adrian Teh
- Starring: Nick Cheung; Annie Liu; Carrie Ng; Cathryn Lee; Lam Wai
- Distributed by: Sundream Motion Pictures; Asia Tropical Films
- Release date: 10 July 2014
- Running time: 82 minutes
- Countries: Hong Kong; Malaysia
- Language: Cantonese
- Box office: US$1,428,745

Hungry Ghost Ritual (盂蘭神功) is a 2014 horror thriller film directed by Nick Cheung. The film was co-produced by Hong Kong and Malaysia, and was released in both places on 10 July 2014.

== Synopsis ==
After incurring debts from his failed business venture in China, Zong Hua (Cheung) returns to Malaysia after a decade's hiatus. The demoralised Zong Hua faces problems finding a job and tries hard to get used to things at home, including his estranged relationship with his step-father, Xiaotian, who runs a Cantonese opera troupe, and half-sister, Jing Jing (Cathryn Lee). Jing Jing is hostile towards Zong Hua as she always has the impression that the death of their mother was caused by the excessive fights between Zong Hua and his step-father.

== Cast ==
- Nick Cheung
- Annie Liu
- Carrie Ng
- Cathryn Lee
- Lam Wai
