= Legal Eagles (TV series) =

Malaysian TV series

- 法网天后
- Genre: Legal drama Romance; Action
- Written by: Tong Kah Ket 唐家杰
- Directed by: 陈祺汉; Ng Lai Huat 黄来发 吴昇儿
- Starring: Felicia Chin; Zhang Zhenhuan
- Opening theme: 对质孤单 by Yise Loo
- Ending theme: 感动的念头 by Chriz Tong
- Country of origin: Singapore
- Original language: Mandarin
- No. of episodes: 30

Production
- Executive producers: Yeo Saik Bin 杨锡彬; Ng Lai Huat 黄来发
- Production locations: Singapore; Malaysia
- Running time: approx. 45 minutes (exc. advertisements)

Original release
- Network: Mediacorp Channel 8
- Release: 7 March – 17 April 2017

Legal Eagles (Chinese: 法网天后) is a Singaporean drama produced by Mediacorp Studios Malaysia and telecast on Mediacorp Channel 8. The show aired at 9pm on weekdays and had a repeat telecast at 8am the following day. The series consists of 30 episodes. It stars Felicia Chin and Zhang Zhenhuan as the casts of this series.

== Cast ==
- Loo Aye Kheng 吕爱琼 as 麦宝华 Mai Baohua Michelle, founder of the law firm M&E
- Rayson Tan as 古天麟 Gu Tianlin Edward, founder of the law firm M&E
  - Teenage version portrayed by 陈立扬
- Felicia Chin as 汤美琪 Tang Meiqi, Xu Yuemei's biological daughter and Zhong Caizhen's adoptive daughter
- Zhang Zhenhuan as 连安生 Lian Ansheng, a lawyer for M&E
- Wee Kheng Ming as 伍家明 Wu Jiaming, a lawyer for M&E
- Aric Ho 何志健 as 蒋忠仁 Jiang Zhongren, an assistant lawyer for M&E
- Zhang Shui Fa (张水发) as Jian Xuting (简旭廷), Jian Junhao's father
- Steve Yap (叶良才) as Jian Junhao (简俊豪), Tang Meiqi's husband
- Mei Jingxuan (梅静萱) as Olive Jian Jiaqing (简佳晴) and Tang Meiqi and Jian Junhao's daughter
- Jordan Voon (温绍平) as Wen Shuren (温树人), Li Qiuqi's husband and a lawyer
- Yu Lisha (余丽莎) as Li Qiuqi (李秋淇), Wen Shuren's wife
- Chen Yingli (陈应莉) as Wen Yishan (温怡珊), Gu Tianlin's wife
- Yise Loo (罗忆诗) as Wen Manning (温曼宁), a lawyer
- Hong Huifang as Zhong Caizhen (钟彩珍), Gu Tianlin's ex-wife who is a school principal
- Denise Camillia Tan as Liao Shasha (廖莎莎), Tang Meiqi's cousin
- Phyllis Quek as Fang Hailun Helen (方海伦), Lian Ansheng's fiancée
- Cathryn Lee as Ella Chen Linlin (陈琳琳)
- Henry Heng (王利泰) as Uncle Lee / A-Fu, Tang Meiqi 's and Junhao's chauffeur
- Lu Jiajun (卢佳俊) as Mr Zhang (张先生), Tracy's husband
- Xiao Yiting (萧依婷) as Tracy Wong, Mr Zhang's Wife
- Haden Hee (许立楷) as Xu Zhengyi (徐正义), a C.I.D. officer
- Hu Wensui as Simon
- Nick Shen as Zhou Xiongwei (周雄伟), a C.I.D. officer
- Johnson Low (刘铨盛) as Zhang Zicheng (张子程), a surgeon
- Queenzy Cheng (庄群施) as Sandy, a lawyer
- Emily Lim (林佩琦) as Amy, a hotel manager
- Jovi Heng (王义翔) as Witness

== See also ==
- List of MediaCorp Channel 8 Chinese drama series (2010s)
