= My Dog Dou Dou =

- Directed by: Ng Say Yong
- Starring: Ivan Lo Kai Jun; Wang Shih-hsien
- Production companies: mm2 Entertainment; Clover Films; Homerun Asia; Singapore Film Commission
- Release date: 20 September 2012
- Running time: 99 minutes
- Country: Singapore
- Languages: English; Mandarin
- Budget: $1.2 million

My Dog Dou Dou (Chinese: 我的狗蚪蚪), is a 2012 Singaporean drama comedy film directed by Ng Say Yong.

== Plot ==
A boy, Xing, takes a stray dog home one day. His pet hating father Meng initially disapproves of this, until he realises that the dog can predict lottery numbers.

== Cast ==
- Ivan Lo Kai Jun as Xing
- Wang Shih-hsien as Meng
- Henry Thia
- Liu Lingling
- Cathryn Lee
- Alvin Wong
- Tommy Kuan

== Release ==
The film released in theatres on 20 September 2012.

== Reception ==
Lin Mingwen of My Paper rated the film three stars out of five. Li Yiyun of Lianhe Zaobao rated the film three stars out of five for entertainment and two-and-a-half stars for art. Yip Wai Yee of The Straits Times rated the film two stars out of five, criticising the inconsistent tone and unnecessary plot points.
