= Cathryn Lee =

Malaysian actress (born 1989)

- 李元玲
- Born: Lee Yuan-ling; 17 July 1989 (age 37) (Note: According to China Press, Lee had her birthday on 17 July 2020 and reached age 31.); Kuala Lumpur, Malaysia
- Education: Royal Birmingham Conservatoire (BMus)
- Occupations: Pianist; Model; Actress
- Years active: 2012–present

Cathryn Lee Yuan-ling (Chinese: 李元玲; born 17 July 1989) is a Malaysian pianist, model and actress best known for her role as Jing Jing in the Hong Kong-Malaysian horror film Hungry Ghost Ritual (2014).

== Biography ==
Lee was born on 17 July 1989 in Kuala Lumpur, Malaysia into a wealthy family. Her mother was a former Miss World Malaysia champion. At the age of 8, she began learning the piano and ballet. After completing high school at 17, Lee enrolled at the Royal Birmingham Conservatoire to study classical piano and later obtained a Bachelor of Music. In 2007, she achieved a Licentiate in Piano Solo from Trinity College London, and was mentored by Chinese pianist Li Yundi in Munich, Germany, during several summers. In 2010, while performing at a hotel in Kuala Lumpur, she caught the attention of Fan Bingbing's agent, who offered her a contract with GME as an artist.

Lee made her acting debut in 2012, starring in the lead role of the drama film My Dog Dou Dou. In 2014, she was cast as Jing Jing, a lead role and the younger half-sister with a strained relationship with Nick Cheung's character, in the Hong Kong-Malaysian horror film Hungry Ghost Ritual and garnered public recognition. She also took on lead roles in the 2016 Hong Kong action comedy film Special Female Force and the 2017 legal thriller series Legal Eagles. Subsequently, she focused on her career as pianist and media personality. In 2021, Lee received significant public backlash after making comments on women's physique in an Instagram story that were widely perceived as body-shaming. She was forced to apologize and temporarily deactivated her social media accounts.

== Filmography ==
=== Film ===
Year	Title	Role	Notes
2012	My Dog Dou Dou	Wu Bi Zhu (吳碧珠)	
2014	Hungry Ghost Ritual	Jing Jing (晶晶)	
2016	Special Female Force	Cat Leung	

=== Television ===
Year	Title	Role	Notes
2013	The Enchanted	Yao Ding Ding (姚丁丁)	Main role
2017	Legal Eagles	Ella Chen Linlin (陳琳琳)	Recurring role
