= Phil Lam =

Hong Kong singer-songwriter

- 林奕匡
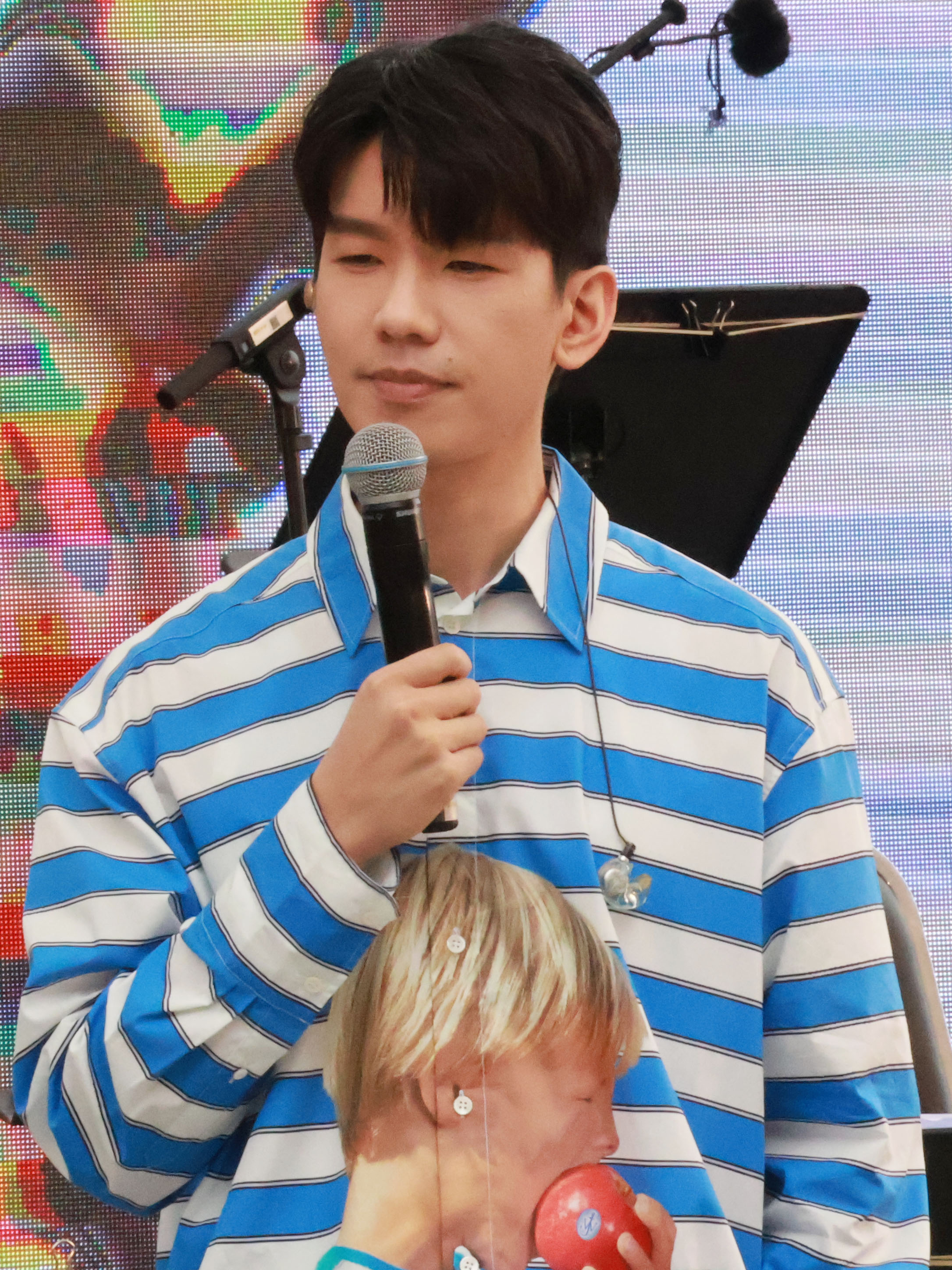
- Phil Lam, 2023
- Born: Nanaimo, Canada
- Occupation: Singer-songwriter
- Years active: 2010–present
- Notable work: Hills and Valleys (高山低谷)
- Spouse: Rikko Lee (m. 2017)
- Musical career
- Origin: Hong Kong
- Genres: Cantopop, Jazz, Rhythm and blues, Indie pop, Electropop, Synth-pop
- Instruments: saxophone, piano (grade 5), guitar

Phil Lam Yik-hong (Chinese: 林奕匡) is a Canadian-born Hong Kong artist and sing-songwriter. Born in Nanaimo and raised in Qualicum Beach, he signed a contract with Sony Music Hong Kong in 2009. He rose to fame in Hong Kong in 2014 with the song Hills and Valleys (高山低谷), which earned him a Top 20 Gold Song Award in the 2014 Jade Solid Gold Best Ten Music Awards Presentation.

== Career ==
=== Early stages of his career: 2007 to 2011 ===
In 2007, Phil Lam participated the Vancouver qualification for the New Talent Singing Awards. Later, he represented Vancouver to participate in the New Talent Singing Awards.

=== 2017 to 2020 ===
In January 2018, Lam announced at the Hit Music Awards Ceremony that he had obtained a Hong Kong identity card.

== Personal life ==
Lam married former TVB host Rikko Lee in 2017.

== Filmography ==
=== Television shows ===
Year	Title	Network	Role	Notes
2020	King Maker III	ViuTV	Judge	EP27-30
2022	Youniverse	HOY TV	Judge	EP16-20
2022	Stars Academy 2	TVB	Coach	

== Songwriting ==
Lam is the composer of the following songs:

- "A world for two" (二人世界) by Jason Chan (2012)
- "Little urchin" (小頑童) by Kay Tse (2013)
- "Still remember" (還記得) by Pakho Chau (2014)
- "How are you?" (別來無恙) by Jason Chan Pak-yu (2015)
- "無聊之歌" by MastaMic Feat. Bianca Wu (2015)
- "睡過頭" by Landy Wen (2015)
- "Dear my friend," by Keung To (2021)
- "難道我還未夠難" by Mischa Ip (2021)
- "第一個迷" by Jeffrey Ngai (2022)
