= Hanjin Tan =

Singaporean singer, music producer, and actor (born 1976)

- Tan in 2019
- Born: 27 January 1976 (age 50); Singapore
- Other name: Chen Huanren
- Education: Anglo-Chinese School; Anglo-Chinese Junior College
- Alma mater: National University of Singapore
- Occupations: Record producer; songwriter; singer; actor
- Years active: 1998−present
- Spouse: Prima Wong (m. 2008)
- Musical career
- Origin: Hong Kong
- Genres: Cantopop; Mandopop; Hip hop
- Instrument: Vocals
- Label: BBS Records

Chinese name
- Traditional Chinese: 陳奐仁
- Simplified Chinese: 陈奂仁
- Hanyu Pinyin: Chén Huàn-rén
- Jyutping: Chan^{4} Wun^{6}-yan^{4}
- Hokkien POJ: Tân Hoàn-jîn

Hanjin Tan (born 27 January 1976) is a Singaporean record producer, songwriter, singer, and actor based in Hong Kong.

== Life and career ==
Hanjin Tan was born on 27 January 1976 in Singapore in a conservative Hainanese family of two siblings. His father worked in the shipping industry and his mother is a housewife. At age 12, he was diagnosed with only half of his hearing in his right ear and 75% in his left. While attending Anglo-Chinese School, Tan sang in the choir and picked up some vocal basics. He started learning guitar at 19, playing in pubs at 20, and writing songs at 21. Tan graduated from the National University of Singapore with a degree in Economics. While there, he got opportunities to write and produce songs for Jacky Cheung and Eason Chan which helped kickstart his music career. Tan moved permanently to Hong Kong in 2009. With over 400 songs to his songwriting credit, he has also worked with various other artistes, including Coco Lee, Sammi Cheng, Joey Yung, and Christina Aguilera over the years. In 2022, Tan had a coaching role on TVB's singing competition show Stars Academy 2.

== Discography ==
=== Studio albums ===
*Some album titles are roughly translated into English for readability purposes. Actual Chinese titles are indicated in parentheses.

- Raw Jazz (2009)
- Contradiction (矛盾) (2013)
- 不求人大樂隊 (2016)
- Buy 1 Get 1 Free (買一送一) (2017)
- Who Is Hanjin Tan (誰是陳奐仁) (2017)
- Clouds In My Coffee (差不多人生) (2017)
- He Is Hanjin Tan (他是陳奐仁) (2017)
- Afterthought (2018)
- Little Song (小小歌) (2019)

=== Concerts ===
- Happiness Can Be Simple (2012)
- Hanjin & Harris – Little Soldiers Concert (2019)

== Filmography ==
=== Television series ===
Year	Title	Role	Notes	Ref.
2011–2012	Til Love Do Us Lie	Ng Ngok-yan	Sitcom	
2014	Come On, Cousin	Himself	Guest star	
2015	Young Charioteers	Mucci Lai Ye Lim		
2016	Fashion War	Man Chi Wai-man		
2020	The Gutter (TV series)	Ken		
2020	Muscle Show	Host		
2022	Stars Academy 2	Coaching supervisor	Singing competition	

=== Film ===
Year	Title	Role	Notes	Ref.
2010	Bruce Lee, My Brother	Skinny Wang		
2011	The Fortune Buddies			
2012	I Love Hong Kong 2012	Himself		
2013	The Best Plan Is No Plan			
2015	Imprisoned: Survival Guide for Rich and Prodigal	Lo Chai		
2016	From Vegas to Macau III			
2019	Missbehavior	Dada Chan Ching		

== Awards and nominations ==
Year	Award	Category	Nominated work	Results	Ref.
2010	Hong Kong Film Awards	Best Newcomer	Bruce Lee, My Brother	Won	
