= Mr. (band) =

Hong Kong pop rock band

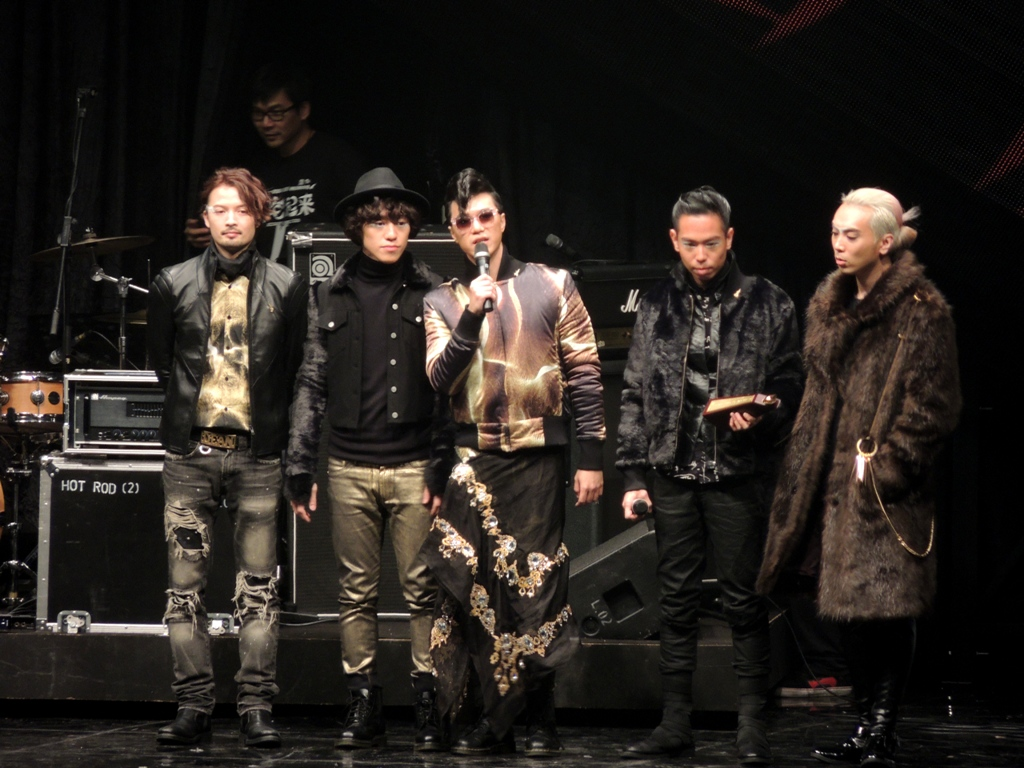
- Mr. at Ultimate Song Chart Awards Presentation on 1 January 2013

Background information
- Origin: Hong Kong
- Genres: Pop rock; Cantopop
- Years active: 2008–2019
- Labels: Universal Music Hong Kong (2008 - 2016)
- Members: Alan Po; Ronny Lay; MJ Tam; Dash Tam; Tom To

Mr. (pronounced Mister; previously known as White Noise) is a Hong Kong pop rock band. They debuted in 2008 under Universal Music Hong Kong with the eponymous EP Mister and have since released nine full-length studio albums. The band consists of Alan Po, Ronny Lay, MJ Tam, Dash Tam, and Tom To.

== History ==
Mr. debuted with the track "Everyone". They released their debut EP Mister on November 12, 2008. Two other singles were released in support of the EP. The band's lead singer Alan was noted for his vocals being similar to Eason Chan. The band won various year-end awards, including the Group Silver Prize at the 2008 Ultimate Song Chart Awards

On 3 September 2009, the band released their first studio album, If I Am... Singles from the album included "Swing" (搖擺), "If I Were Eason Chan" (如果我是陳奕迅), "Forest", and "Mr. Tam", a duet with Alan Tam. "Swing" topped the Ultimate Song Chart. "If I Were Eason Chan" helped Mr. gain popularity in Hong Kong, topping three music charts and earned multiple year-end awards. At the 2009 Ultimate Song Chart Awards Presentation, "If I Were Eason Chan" was awarded "My Favourite Song" and Mr. won "My Favorite Group".

The next year Mr. released a remix album titled Like Black. They held their first headlining concert at the Hong Kong Coliseum on 6–7 March 2010, the first band since the legendary Beyond to hold a concert there.

In October 2010, Mr. collaborated with Alan Tam on the album Rolling Power (滾軸力量). The bilingual album consists of 10 Mandarin tracks and 10 Cantonese tracks. "Life of John" and "Go" were released as singles in support of the album.

"Tonight Tonight" was released to radio stations in late 2010, topping charts on Metro Radio and 903 Ultimate Song Chart. On 16 May 2011, Mr. released their fourth studio album, People Sing For People. On July 3–4, they headlined their second major concert Everyone Concert 02 at the Hong Kong Coliseum.

In March 2012, Mr. released an eight-track studio album titled Misterdays. The single "Yesterday" (昨天) topped music charts and won various year-end awards.

To promote their upcoming studio album, New Beginning, "What R We Fighting 4", "Sense of Direction" (方向感), "A Love Song" (一首情歌) were released as singles. On 4–5 January 2013, Mr. headlined their third major concert, New Beginning Live at the Hong Kong Coliseum. That same day, their sixth studio album New Beginning was released. The band stayed in Taiwan for ten months to work on their first Mandarin album Fly (飛行的一百個理由). Five singles from the album were released as singles, including the title track "Fly", "Love and Peace", "Wake Up", and "Merry Christmas To You : )". Fly was released on 25 March 2014.

In 2015, disputes between the band and Universal Music, and among the members themselves led to them not renewing their record contract with Universal, which ended in June 2016. The albums We R Mr. Vol. 1 and We R Mr. Vol. 2, containing new tracks and greatest hits were released on 13 April 2017. Universal sent the track "Unbending" (不屈) to radio stations. The song peaked at No. 9 on Ultimate Song Chart.

The band reunited in 2019, releasing two new singles and held their 10th anniversary concert Everyone Concert 10 on 16–17 May 2019.

== Members ==
- Alan Po (布志綸, lead vocalist)
- Ronny Lay (黎澤恩, rhythm guitarist)
- Quincy "MJ" Tam (譚傑明, lead guitarist)
- Desmond "Dash" Tam (譚健文, bass guitarist and backing vocals)
- Tom To (杜志烜, drummer)

== Discography ==
=== Studio albums ===
- Mister (2008)
- If I Am... (2009)
- Rolling Power (with Alan Tam) (2010)
- People Sing for People (2011)
- Misterdays (2012)
- New Beginning (2013)
- 100 Reasons To Fly 飛行的一百個理由 (2014)
- We R Mr. Vol. 1 (Studio + Greatest Hits) (2017)
- We R Mr. Vol. 2 (Studio + Greatest Hits) (2017)

=== Extended plays ===
- Reality Game 現實遊戲 (2015)

=== Live albums ===
- Everyone Concert 01 (2010)
- Everyone Concert 02: People Sing For People 2011 Live (2011)

=== Remix album ===
- Like Black (2010)
