= Heidi Lee =

American fashion designer

Heidi Lee is a Couture Hat fashion designer who was born in Flushing, Queens, New York. She grew up living in Philadelphia, Pennsylvania.

== Career ==
Lee became interested in fashion when she was six years old. She received a B.F.A. and B.G.D. in graphic design from Rhode Island School of Design in 2005.

Lee focuses on hats and headwear as a form of conceptual art as well as fashion elements. Her work has been featured in Vogue, Visionaire, Dazed, MTV, New York Times, New York Magazine, and The Creators Project. Her works have been exhibited at the Kentucky Derby Museum, MOSI Museum's “3D Printing the Future”, and MAD Museum MAD Biennial: 100 Makers that manifest the cultural capital of NYC.” Some of her clients include Beyoncé, Jennifer Lopez, Billy Porter, Pat McGrath, Anne Hathaway, Madonna, G-Dragon, Lady Gaga, Missy Elliott, and Lauryn Hill.

She currently runs her own fashion brand called H E I D I L E E, and teaches fashion classes at New York University School of Professional Studies. She has also taught at Parsons, Rhode Island School of Design, National Arts Club, Brooklyn Museum, MAD Museum, and Beam Center and has guest lectured at Google (Mountain View), FIT, Parsons, UPenn, and VCU Arts (QA), NYU ITP; Lee has also served as a guest critic at Eyebeam's Computational Fashion Master Class.

Lee garnered the Metropolitan Museum of Art Costume Institute Accessory Design Award in 2012 for her Cocktail Parasol Hat and Parasol Skeleton Hat designs. Her work was featured on the runway for Silicon Valley Fashion Week 2016.

== Family ==
Shiyoon Kim, the Korean American character designer and concept artist, is her first cousin.
