= Pentecostal School, Hong Kong =

Coordinates: 22.3213°N 114.1816°E

Pentecostal School
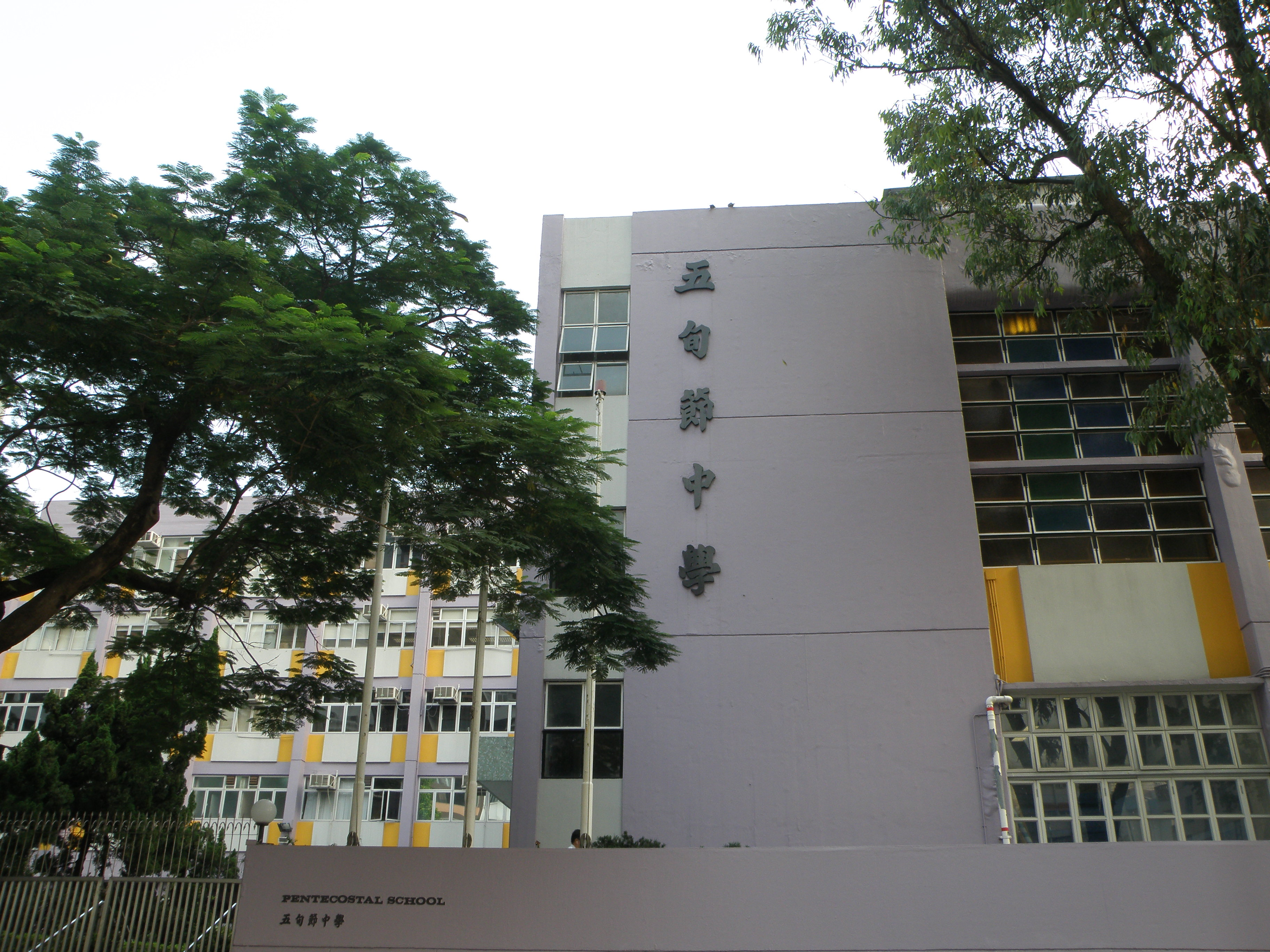
- Pentecostal School in Ho Man Tin, Hong Kong
- Ho Man Tin, Kowloon; Hong Kong

Information
- Principle: Dr. Kwok Piu, Yeung
- Mascot: Pigeon

Pentecostal School (simplified Chinese: 五旬节中学; traditional Chinese: 五旬節中學; pinyin: Wǔxúnjié Zhōngxué) is an Anglo-Chinese secondary school founded by the Kowloon Pentecostal Church in Hong Kong in 1973. The school first started off as a non-profit making private school and then became fully subsidized in 1982. The school logo is a flying pigeon symbolizing the Holy Spirit, and with the school motto "Love, Faith and Hope" beneath it.

== Location ==
Pentecostal School is located at 14 Perth Street in Ho Man Tin, Kowloon, Hong Kong. It consists of two main buildings, one hall, one sheltered sports area beneath the hall, two basketball courts and a badminton court.

== Education ==
Pentecostal School is divided into seven forms, with students aged from 13 to 18. From Forms one to three, students are taught the compulsory subjects of Chinese, English, Mathematics and general science. Forms four and forms five prepare students for the Hong Kong Certificate of Education Examination (HKCEE). Upon qualifying for the A-Level examinations, students gain another two years of studies.

=== Junior ===
The Junior stage consists of Forms one to three. The classes are labelled A to E. Classes are arranged such that class A contains the most capable students (determined from an entry test or final results of previous year), decreasing with ability to class E. There are approximately 40 students in one class.

Chinese, English, Mathematics and general science are compulsory.

=== Senior ===
The Senior stage consists of Forms four to five. Students are separated into three streams: Science, Art or Commerce. Classification depends on the student's academic performance and interests. Classes E and D concentrate on the sciences; class E offers Computing but class D does not. Classes C and B concentrate on the arts; class C has Economics, which class B does not. Lastly, class A offers Commerce.

Chinese, English and Mathematics are compulsory.

a)Sciences Additional Mathematics, Physics, Chemistry, Biology and Computer Science.

b)Arts Chinese Literature, Chinese History, English Literature

c)Commerce Accounting, Economics

Forms six to seven

== Extracurricular activities ==
There are many interest and activities groups formed by students, including basketball, astronomy, English, and Chinese.
