= SDU: Sex Duties Unit =

2013 Hong Kong film by Gary Mak

- Film poster
- Traditional Chinese: 飛虎出征
- Simplified Chinese: 飞虎出征
- Hanyu Pinyin: Fēi Hǔ Chū Zhēng
- Jyutping: Fei1 Fu2 Ceot1 Zing1
- Directed by: Gary Mak
- Written by: Jody Luk
- Produced by: Pang Ho-cheung; Leung Kai Yun
- Starring: Chapman To; Shawn Yue; Matt Chow; Derek Tsang
- Cinematography: Charlie Lam
- Edited by: Wenders Li
- Music by: Wong Ngai Lun; Janet Yung
- Production companies: Sun Entertainment Culture; Making Film
- Distributed by: Media Asia Distributions
- Release date: 25 July 2013
- Running time: 95 minutes
- Country: Hong Kong
- Language: Cantonese

SDU: Sex Duties Unit is a 2013 Hong Kong action comedy film directed by Gary Mak and starring Chapman To, Shawn Yue, Matt Chow and Derek Tsang. SDU: Sex Duties Unit was one of the films to be presented at the 2013 Hong Kong FILMART. This film was released on 25 July 2013 in Hong Kong.

== Plot ==
The Special Duties Unit (SDU) is an elite paramilitary tactical unit of the Hong Kong Police Force and is considered one of the world's finest in its role. But being the best carries its own burdens. Like everyone else, they go through troubles with love, with family and with their jobs. And sometimes they get horny.

This touching story is about Special Duties Unit Team B and their trip to Macau for a weekend of unadulterated debauchery.

== Cast ==
- Chapman To as Siu Keung
- Shawn Yue as Fu
- Matt Chow as Ka Ho
- Derek Tsang as Hai Mai
- Liu Anqi as Sai Sai
- Dada Chan as Siu Keung's ex-wife
- Jim Chim as procurer
- Siu Yam-yam as procurer
- Simon Lui as boatman
- Lam Suet as robber
- June Lam as prostitute
- Benz Hui as pharmacy owner
- JJ Jia as pharmacy owner's daughter
- Lau Kong as Ka Ho's father
- Pong Nan as procurer's assistant
- Michael Wong as SDU superior
- Ken Lo as Thief King To
- Joe Tay as jewelry store employee
- Lawrence Chou as Macau police sergeant
- Ken Wong as Macau police sergeant
- Tony Ho as Macau police constable

== Reception ==
SDU: Sex Duties Unit earned HK$16,711,696 at the Hong Kong box office.

Andrew Chan of the Film Critics Circle of Australia writes, " “SDU: Sex Duties Unit” is certainly not as good as Vulgaria in terms of quality filmmaking, but it is most certainly outrageously funny and sometimes, that is precisely what the local audience demands."

It was released to Blu-ray, DVD, VCD on 5 December 2013.
