= Jim Chim =

Hong Kong actor and comedian (born 1965)

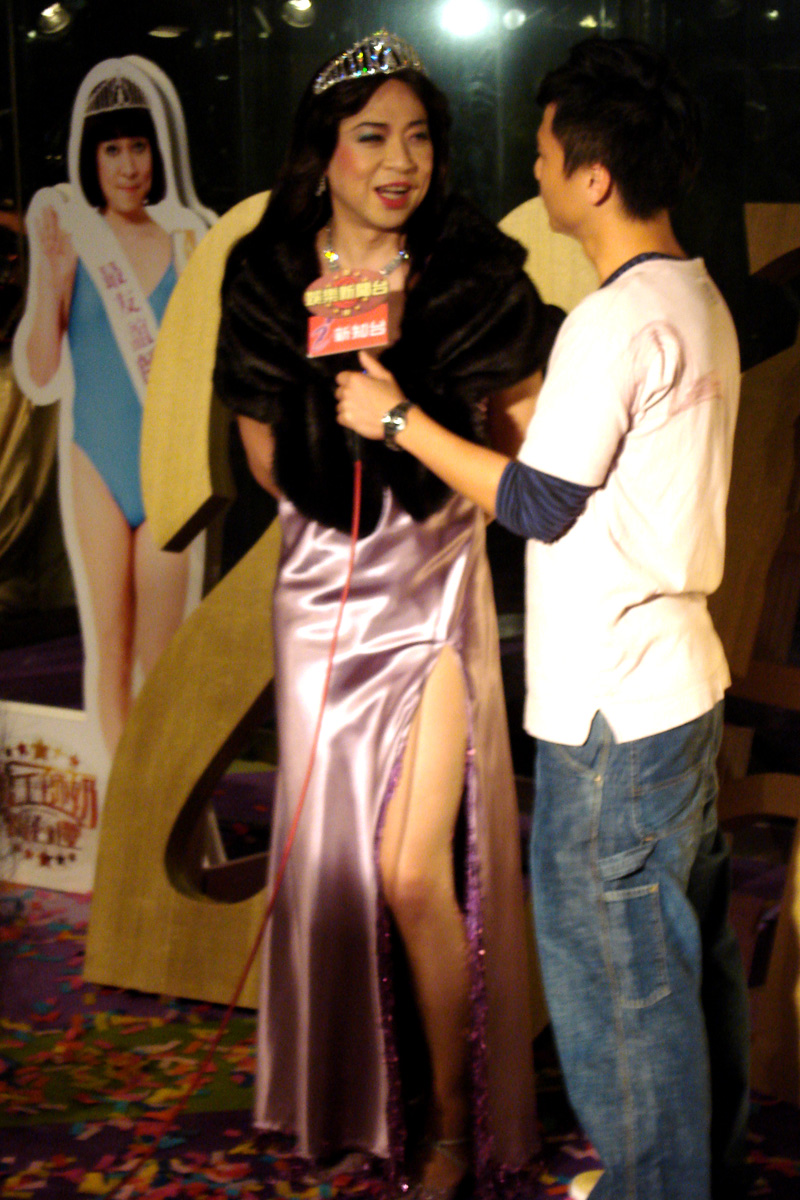
- Chim in 2008
- Born: May 6, 1965 (age 61); Hong Kong
- Partner: Olivia Yan 甄詠蓓
- Children: Chim Lok Tung 詹樂童

Chinese name
- Traditional Chinese: 詹瑞文
- Simplified Chinese: 詹瑞文
Transcriptions
Standard Mandarin
- Hanyu Pinyin: Zhān Ruìwén

Jim Chim Sui-man (Chinese: 詹瑞文; pinyin: Zhān Ruìwén; born 6 May 1965) is a Hong Kong–based stage actor and comedian.

== Biography ==
Jim Chim, Associate Artistic Director of Theatre Ensemble, co-founded the company with his then-partner and wife, Olivia Yan in 1993. Since then, he has been performing and directing performances that have been critically acclaimed and popular with Hong Kong audiences. He is widely recognized for his distinctive brand of humour, physical movement and performance style.

He was presented with the first Drama Development Fellowship from Hong Kong Arts Development Council Drama Committee in 2000. He also received the Best Supporting Actor Award and the Best Actor Award from the Hong Kong Federation of Drama Society in 1998 and 2000, respectively.

Apart from creative and performing achievements, Chim also devoted himself to theatre training and established the PIP-Pleasure In Play artistic concept. In 2003, he founded the PIP School, not only providing professional training in performing arts, but also further conveying the PIP style of living. He has been invited to conduct acting and movement workshops for local and overseas universities and professional arts organizations, including Ecole Philippe Gaulier (UK), The Theatre Practice (Singapore), National Drama Company of China, U-Theatre (Taiwan) and the very first full-time theatre school in Tokyo established by New National Theatre (Japan).

Chim has worked with both foreign and local artists, including David Glass and Meng Jin Hui. In recent years, he has also been highly involved in local cinema and has appeared in movies such as You Shoot, I Shoot, Men Suddenly in Black, Isabella, McDull, the Alumni and Driving Miss Wealthy. For the last, he was a Best Supporting Actor nominee at the 24th Hong Kong Film Awards. He also lent his voice in various Cantonese Chinese dubs of Hollywood films, most notably as adult Simba in The Lion King (1994) and as Dave Douglas in The Shaggy Dog (2006).

In 2004, Chim was honored with the “Men of Vision 2004” award by Royal Salute and was invited by the U.S. Department of State’s Bureau of Educational and Cultural Affairs to visit the United States in August 2006 as a grantee of its cultural exchange program, the International Visitor Leadership Program (IVLP).

== Filmography ==
Year	Title	Role	Awards
2001	You Shoot, I Shoot	Dai Hung/Kwok Wai-bun	
2002	Mighty Baby	Raymond Kim	
2003	Good Times, Bed Times		
2003	Dragon Loaded 2003	Loan Shark	
2003	Men Suddenly in Black	Baggio	
2003	Spy Dad	Mrs. Tung	
2004	Driving Miss Wealthy	Peter/Aunt Mary/Uncle Big/Policeman/Fake	Nominated - Hong Kong Film Award for Best Supporting Actor
2004	Supermodel		
2004	Ambush	Chu Yan	
2004	Twins Effect 2	Rebel Leader	
2004	Escape from Hong Kong Island	Bank Employee	
2004	Beyond Our Ken	Shirley's ex-boyfriend	
2004	Kung Fu Soccer	Butcher Chu	
2005	DragonBlade	Master Wu	
2005	A.V.	Uncle	
2006	McDull, the Alumni		
2006	Isabella	Landlord	
2006	Men Suddenly in Black 2		
2007	Simply Actors		
2007	Exodus	Man in wheelchair	
2009	McDull, Kung Fu Kindergarten	Storyteller	
2010	Beauty on Duty	Stephen Sum	
2011	I Love Hong Kong		
2011	Men Suddenly in Love		
2011	Microsex Office		
2011	A Simple Life		
2012	Love in the Buff		
2012	Vulgaria		
2013	Young and Dangerous: Reloaded		
2013	Hotel Deluxe		
2013	Mortician		
2013	SDU: Sex Duties Unit		
2014	Golden Chicken 3		
2014	Black Comedy		
2014	Flirting in the Air	Dui Tong-gai	
2015	Lost in Hong Kong (港囧)		
2016	Good Take, Too!		
2016	Girl of the House		
2016	Sky on Fire		
2017	Cook Up a Storm		
2017	Vampire Cleanup Department		
2017	Control Freaky		
2018	A Beautiful Moment		
2018	Agent Mr Chan		
2019	I Love You, You're Perfect, Now Change!		
2019	Enter the Fat Dragon		

== Stage appearance ==
- 2007–2008 Man-tiger
- 2007–2008 My Life as a TV

== Education ==
- Po On Commercial Association Primary School
- The Hong Kong Academy for Performing Arts
