= I Love Hong Kong =

2011 Hong Kong film by Eric Tsang

- Film poster

Chinese name
- Traditional Chinese: 我愛HK開心萬歲
- Simplified Chinese: 我爱HK开心万岁
Transcriptions
Standard Mandarin
- Hanyu Pinyin: Wǒ Ài HK Kāi Xīn Wàn Suì
Yue: Cantonese
- Jyutping: Ngo5 Ngoi3 HK Hoi1 Sam1 Maan6 Seoi3
- Directed by: Eric Tsang; Chung Shu Kai
- Written by: Wong Yeung Tat; Heiward Mak
- Produced by: Eric Tsang
- Starring: Eric Tsang; Tony Leung Ka-fai; Sandra Ng; Anita Yuen; Aarif Rahman; Fala Chen; Stanley Fung; Bosco Wong; Wong Cho-lam; Luk Wing; Mag Lam
- Cinematography: Tony Cheung
- Edited by: Wenders Li; Mok Man-Ho
- Music by: Johnny Yim
- Production companies: Shaw Brothers Studio; Television Broadcasts Limited; Mei Ah Film Production Co. Ltd. Sil-Metropole Organisation
- Distributed by: Intercontinental Film Distributors (HK)
- Release date: 3 February 2011 (Hong Kong)
- Running time: 104 minutes
- Country: Hong Kong
- Language: Cantonese
- Box office: $10,219,319

I Love Hong Kong is a 2011 Hong Kong comedy film produced and directed by Eric Tsang. Film stars Tsang, Tony Leung Ka-fai, Sandra Ng and a star-studded cast of Hong Kong stars. It was released for Chinese New Year. It was followed by two sequels, I Love Hong Kong 2012 and I Love Hong Kong 2013.

== Cast ==
=== Ng family ===
Cast	Role	Description
Stanley Fung	Ng Tung 吳通	Ng Shun's father
Tony Leung Ka-fai	Ng Shun 吳順	Shun So's husband Ng Tung's son Ng Ming, Ng Chi, Ng King's father Dragon Cheng's friend
Bosco Wong (Youth)	Ng Shun 吳順	Shun So's husband Ng Tung's son Ng Ming, Ng Chi, Ng King's father Dragon Cheng's friend
Sandra Ng	Shun So 順 嫂	Ng Shun's wife Ng Ming, Ng Chi, Ng King's mother
Aarif Rahman	Ng Ming 吳明	Ng Shun and Shun So's son Ng Chi and Ng King's older brother Lee Kei's boyfriend Food and Environmental Hygiene Department staff
Mag Lam (林欣彤)	Ng Chi 吳芝	Ng Shun and Shun So's daughter Ng Ming's younger sister Ng King's elder sister
Chan Wing Lam (陳穎嵐)	Ng King 吳京	Ng Shun and Shun So's daughter Ng Ming and Ng Chi's younger sister

=== Other cast ===
Cast	Role	Description
Eric Tsang	Dragon Cheng 鄭瑞龍	Ng Shun's friend
Wong Cho-lam (Youth)	Dragon Cheng 鄭瑞龍	Ng Shun's friend
Anita Yuen	So Ching 素貞	Chinese physian Ng Shun's first lover Shun So's love rival
Jess Shum (Youth)	So Ching 素貞	Chinese physian Ng Shun's first lover Shun So's love rival
Fala Chen	Lee Kei (Nikki) 李琪	Wu Ma's daughter Ng Ming's girlfriend English Tutor Queen
Wu Ma	李滷味	Fala Chen's father Hawker
Liu Kai-chi (Youth)	李滷味	Fala Chen's father Hawker
Luk Wing Kuen (陸永權)	葉謝鄧	Ng Chi's friend
Yu Mo Lin (余慕蓮)		Hawker
Wayne Lai	Wayne Lai 黎耀祥	Actor portraying Lau Sing
Louis Yuen		
Johnson Lee		
Terrence Chui (小肥)		
Maggie Cheung Ho-yee	Sheren Tang 鄧萃雯	Actress portraying Cheng Kau Mui
Raymond Wong Ho-yin		
Mak Cheung-ching		
King Kong (金剛		
Felix Wong		
Michael Tse		
Michael Miu	Brother Three 三哥	Triad Gang leader
Patrick Tam		Food and Environmental Hygiene Department Hawker Senior Inspector
Kate Tsui		
Joyce Cheng		
Ron Ng		Food and Environmental Hygiene Department staff
Lai Lok-yi		
JJ Jia (賈曉晨		
Stephen Huynh		
Ram Chiang (蔣志光)		
Ngo Ka-nin		
Christine Kuo		Property agent
Koni Lui		Beauty Shop promoting staff
Jeanette Leung (梁政珏)		Beauty Shop promoting staff
Hui Wing (許穎)		
To Kong (杜港)		Food and Environmental Hygiene Department Hawker Inspector
Nathan Ngai (魏焌皓)		Food and Environmental Hygiene Department staff
Joey Law (羅天宇)		Food and Environmental Hygiene Department staff
Kim Li (李偉健)		Food and Environmental Hygiene Department staff
Cheng Wing Him (鄭詠謙)		Food and Environmental Hygiene Department staff
Wong Chi Tik (王致迪)		Food and Environmental Hygiene Department staff
Billy Kong		Food and Environmental Hygiene Department staff
Fong Siu Chung (方紹聰)		Food and Environmental Hygiene Department staff
Lee Sin Hang (李善恆)		Food and Environmental Hygiene Department staff
Jim Tang		
Vincent Wong		
Oscar Leung (梁烈唯)		
Suki Lee (李彩寧)		
Michelle Lo (盧覓雪)		
Kiki Sheung		
Benz Hui		
Tang Ying Man (鄧英敏)		
Lam Suet		
Chan Tik Hak (陳狄克)		
Tenky Tin (田啟文)		
Bobby Yip (八兩金)		
Natalie Tong		Radio announcer
Wyman Wong		TV host
Alex Fong		Soccer coach
G.E.M.		Student
Nancy Sit		
Carol Cheng		Master of Ceremonies
James Ng (吳業坤)		
Cilla Lok (樂瞳)		
