= Hong Kong Schools Speech Festival =

The Hong Kong Schools Speech Festival is one of Hong Kong's largest inter-school competitions, and is organized by the Hong Kong Schools Music and Speech Association. Primary and secondary school students across Hong Kong deliver speeches in English and Chinese. The festival has been running for the past 70 years.

It is known as one of the prime events in which primary through secondary school students have the chance to challenge themselves in spoken English. Schools see first hand the confidence gained and improvement in their students English through their participation in the event.

== Events ==
The following is a list of typical events (in English) each year:

- Solo Verse Speaking
- Harmonic Choral Speaking (Open)
- Choral Speaking (Non-Open)
- Prose Speaking (Open)
- Prose Reading (Non-Open)
- Bible Reading
- Public Speaking Solo
- Public Speaking Team
- Words and Movement
- Thematic Group Speaking
- Improvised Dramatic Scenes
- Shakespeare Monologue
- Solo Dramatic Performance
- Dramatic Scenes
- Dramatic Duologue
- Rehearsed Original Scene

== Prizes ==
Students can place 1st, 2nd, 3rd or receive certificates in Honours (90 marks or over), Merit (80 – 89 marks) and Proficiency (75 – 79 marks). Most schools in Hong Kong recognize this event to be one of the most important accolades that a student can receive and it is often mentioned in most schools list of achievements.
