= I Love Hong Kong 2012 =

2012 Hong Kong film by Eric Tsang

- Film poster
- Traditional Chinese: 2012我愛HK 喜上加囍
- Simplified Chinese: 2012我爱HK 喜上加囍
- Hanyu Pinyin: Èr Líng Yī Èr Wǒ Ài HK Xǐ Shàng Jiā Xǐ
- Jyutping: Ji6 Ling4 Jat1 Ji6 Ngo5 Ngoi3 HK Hei2 Seong6 Gaa1 Hei2
- Directed by: Chung Shu Kai; Chin Kwok Wai
- Written by: Kwok Kin-Lok; Leung Lai-Yin; Peter Tsi; Michelle Tsui
- Produced by: Eric Tsang; Chik Ka Kei
- Starring: Eric Tsang; Teresa Mo; Bosco Wong; Denise Ho; Stanley Fung; Siu Yam-yam; William So; Mak Cheung-ching; 6-Wing; Vivian Zhang
- Cinematography: Ko Chiu-lam
- Edited by: Wenders Li
- Production companies: Shaw Brothers Studio; Television Broadcasts Limited
- Distributed by: Intercontinental Film Distributors (HK)
- Release date: 21 January 2012
- Running time: 100 minutes
- Country: Hong Kong
- Language: Cantonese
- Box office: US$2.47 million

I Love Hong Kong 2012 is a 2012 Hong Kong comedy film produced by Eric Tsang and directed by Chung Shu Kai and Chin Kwok Wai. Film stars an ensemble cast of Tsang, Teresa Mo, Bosco Wong, Denise Ho, Stanley Fung, Siu Yam-yam, William So, Mak Cheung-ching, 6-Wing, and Vivian Zhang, along with guest stars. This film is a sequel to the 2011 film I Love Hong Kong with a different storyline but similar theme.

== Cast ==
- Stanley Fung as Kwok Ching, a TV weatherman
- Teresa Mo as Kwok Mei-Mei, Kwok Ching's eldest daughter
- Eric Tsang as Yao Ming, Kwok Mei-Mei's husband
- Denise Ho as Kwok Jing-Jing, Kwok Ching's second daughter
- Bosco Wong as Kwok Jing-Jing's boyfriend
- Luk Wing as Kwok Sing-Sing, Kwok Ching's youngest son
- Mak Cheung-ching as Kwok Ching's brother
- Hoi Sang Lee as Kwok Ching's Colleague
- Siu Yam-yam
- William So as Roberto, a TV station owner
- Viann Zhang
- Benz Hui
- Tats Lau
- Mimi Chu
- Michelle Lo
- Louis Yuen
- King Kong
- Eddie Pang
- Osman Hung
- Otto Wong
- Eric Tse
- Celine Ma
- Yu Mo Lin
- William Wu
- Lo Mang
- Ku Feng
- Christine Kuo
- Sire Ma
- Cilia Lok
- Mandy Wong
- Matthew Ko
- William Chak
- Natalie Meng
- Jess Sum
- Jacquelin Chong
- Lisa Chong
- Eliza Sam
- Gill Mohindepaul Singh
- Tony Yee
- Bella Lam
- Ng Yiu Ming
- Wong Chun Kei
- Auston Lam
- Ryan Lau
- Brian Tse
- Lam King Ching
- Tang Siu Hau
- Wong Chi Wai
- Lo Fan
- Michelle Yim
- Edward Chui
- Stephy Tang as a head nurse

== Release ==
The film was released for Chinese New Year 2012.
