= AGA (singer) =

Hong Kong singer-songwriter (born 1988)

- 江海迦
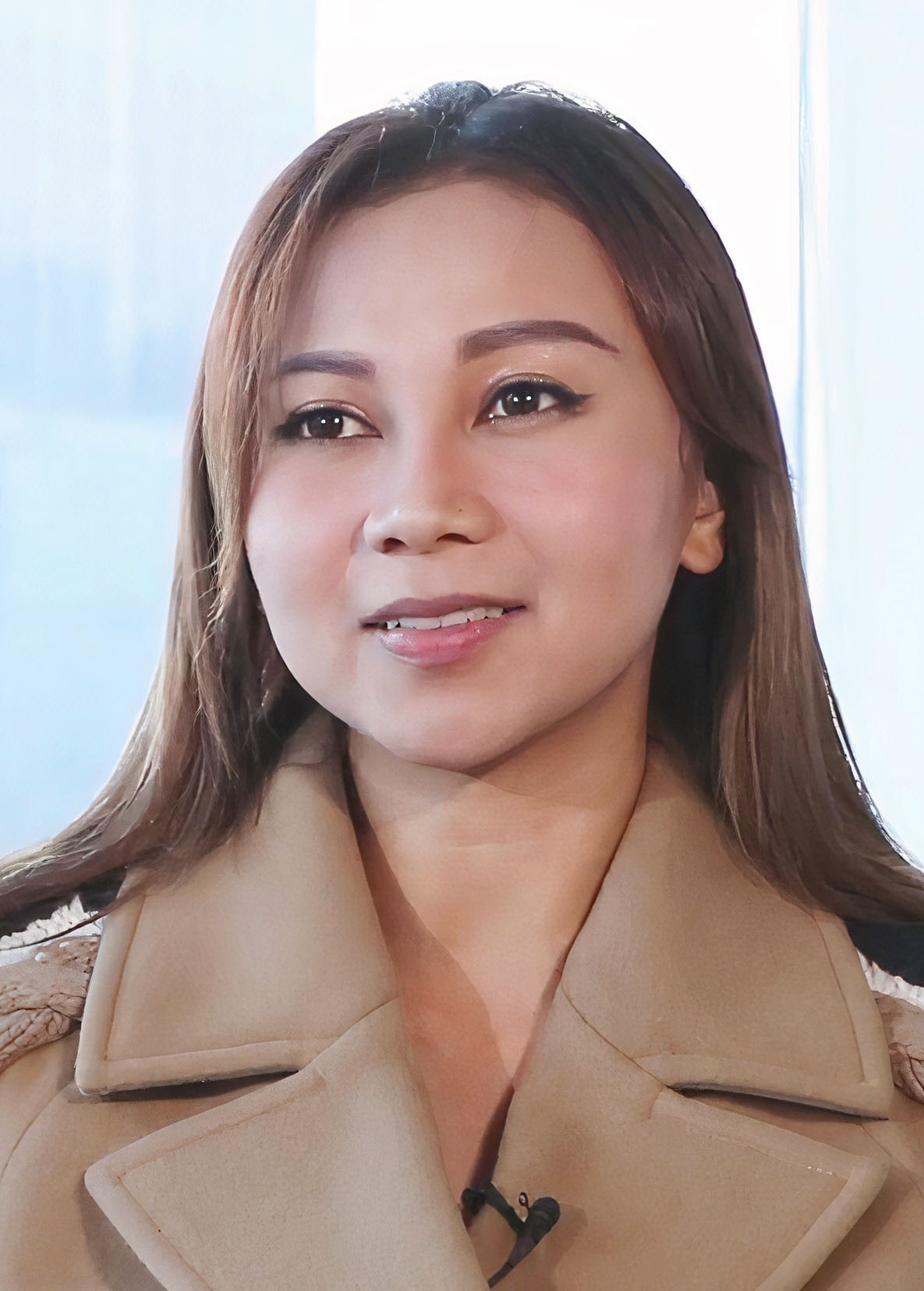
- Kong interviewed by am730 in 2020
- Occupations: Singer; songwriter; actress
- Years active: 2013–present
- Musical career
- Origin: Hong Kong
- Genres: Cantopop; R&B
- Instruments: Piano; guitar
- Label: Universal Music Hong Kong (2013-2025)

Chinese name
- Chinese: 江海迦
Transcriptions
Standard Mandarin
- Hanyu Pinyin: Jiāng Hǎijiā
Yue: Cantonese
- Jyutping: Gong^{1} Hoi^{2} gaa^{1}
- Hong Kong Romanisation: Kong Hoi-ka

Agatha Kong Hoi-ka (Chinese: 江海迦), better known by her stage name AGA, is a Hong Kong singer-songwriter. She debuted under Universal Music Hong Kong in 2013 with the song "Hello" (哈囉).

== Life and career ==
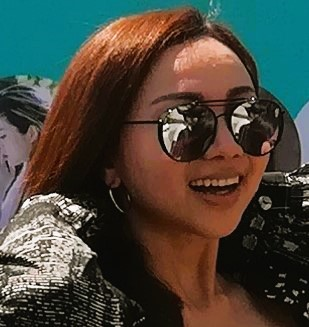
Kong at the Chinese University of Hong Kong on 4 October 2018

Kong's English name "Agatha" is a name of the Sicilian Catholic saint Agatha, and was named by her childhood priest. Kong was born into a musical family. Her father is a Filipino band musician of Spanish descent, her mother is proficient in piano, and her eldest and second sisters are also musicians who often perform with their father's band. Therefore, she has been influenced by music since she was a child and is proficient in piano, guitar and singing.

Prior to becoming a singer, AGA worked as a flight attendant, hoping to save enough money to study music abroad. After being discovered by renown Hong Kong producer Schuman (舒文), she began composing demos for him.

Ginadoll was released 14 March 2016 and was certified gold.

At the Ginadoll Joy Conference, AGA announced her first solo ticketed concert, titled "AGA Ginadoll Concert Live," to be held at the MacPherson Indoor Arena on July 29 and 30, 2016. Tickets went on sale on June 3 and were enthusiastically received, selling out within a week. Her duet with Gin Lee, "Unique," won both the "Metro Hot Song" award at the 2016 Metro Hot Songs Awards and the "Top Ten Chinese Golden Songs" award at the 39th Top Ten Chinese Golden Songs Awards.

AGA released her album "Luna" on 22 January 2018.

Despite this, she still insisted on creating during the epidemic, and even participated in the work behind the scenes of the music video for the song "See You Next Time"; she also produced the second melody written in life "I don't love this song" It is the song "So Called Love Song". The three songs are all included in the fully composed album "So Called Love Songs" released on 28 September of the same year. In October, AGA was nominated for the Most Popular Artist in Greater China at the 2020 MTV European Music Awards, becoming the only Hong Kong singer shortlisted for that year. After her contract with Universal Music expired, she decided not to renew it and returned to Australia.

== Discography ==
- AGA (2013)
- ONE (EP) (2014)
- Ginadoll (2016)
- Luna (2018)
- So Called Love Songs (2020)
- AGA's Love Episode #1 (2021)
- Here and There (Live) (2021)
- Agatha (2024)
- Writer's Block (2025)

== Filmography ==
- The Moment (2016)

== Variety show ==
- Stars Academy (2021)

== Concerts ==
Year	Date	Name	Venue	Notes/Ref.
2016	29–30 July	AGA Ginadoll Concert Live	Macpherson Stadium, Hong Kong	
2023	26–27 August	AGA ONEDERFUL LIVE 2023	Hong Kong Coliseum	
