= Hotel Deluxe =

2013 Hong Kong film by Vincent Kok

- Film poster
- Directed by: Vincent Kok
- Screenplay by: Vincent Kok; Anselm Chan; Steven Fung; Poon Jun Lam
- Produced by: Raymond Wong
- Starring: Ronald Cheng; Sandra Ng; Teresa Mo; Chapman To; Raymond Wong; Fiona Sit; Eric Kot; Jim Chim; Lynn Hung; Karena Ng; Min Hun Fung
- Cinematography: Cheung Man Po
- Edited by: Kwong Chi Leung
- Music by: Dennie Wong Tan-Yee
- Production companies: Pegasus Motion Pictures; Sil-Metropole Organisation; Le Vision Pictures; Hangzhou Tianma Entertainment; Shanghai Hehe Entertainment Investment
- Distributed by: Pegasus Motion Pictures
- Release dates: 1 February 2013 (China); 7 February 2013 (Hong Kong)
- Running time: 108 minutes
- Country: Hong Kong
- Language: Cantonese
- Box office: $8.4 million

Hotel Deluxe (百星酒店) is a 2013 Hong Kong comedy film released in commemoration with the Lunar New Year of 2013. The film was directed by Vincent Kok, his thirteenth as a director, and written by him along with Chan Mou Yin Anselm (credited as Anselm Chan), Steven Fung, and Poon Jun Lam. Produced by Raymond Wong, Hotel Deluxe features many of the recurring cast from his All's Well, Ends Well film series.

== Plot ==
Set in the fictional "Hundred Stars Hotel" in Hangzhou, the story follows a relatively incompetent staff tasked with retaining the coveted five-star rating, a goal headed by the new executive named Cruella Koo (Teresa Mo).

== Cast ==
- Sandra Ng as Peach, the obsessive-compulsive Head of Room Services who is frequently seen with a powerful vacuum cleaner at her disposal. Her initial rivalry with Cruella turns into a quiet respect for one another when they both have to work together to save the hotel. Ng's previous role in a Vincent Kok-directed film was in the comedy All's Well, Ends Well 2009.
- Chapman To as Pacino, the playful bartender of the Hundred Stars Hotel that assists in many of the management's crises, including pretending to be the fake father of Bo Bo's fake groom.
- Ronald Cheng as OK Pao, an assistant general manager who manages to land a role in the movie being filmed at the hotel, costarring alongside his idol, Marilyn. OK later realizes his mutual attraction for his old friend, Bo Bo, in the midst of planning a fake wedding for her and keeping the hotel from falling apart.
- Teresa Mo as Cruella Koo, the newly appointed general manager who pushes the existing team at Hundred Stars Hotel to make greater efforts amid the growing problems there. Cruella is initially at odds with the employees, particularly Peach, but eventually gains their satisfaction of her overseeing the hotel. Mo reportedly opted to work with Raymond Wong on this film after declining another role for producer Eric Tsang, whom she worked with in another New Year film, I Love Hong Kong 2012.
- Fiona Sit as Bo Bo, an old friend of OK who attempts a fake wedding at the Hundred Stars Hotel in order to keep her family inheritance. After a photo test from the fake wedding's photographer, Bo Bo realizes her romantic feelings for OK, which are made more complicated by OK's own growing connection with Marilyn.
- Raymond Wong as Ho San, the obsessive-compulsive uncle of Bo Bo who also is fighting for the family inheritance. He also develops an attraction to Peach.
- Lynn Hung as Audrey, a seemingly sweet-natured celebrity in public, only to reveal her true self as demanding and hostile towards the hotel staff.
- Karena Ng as Marilyn, an eccentric actress filming at the hotel who also strikes a close friendship with OK.
- Jim Chim as a fisherman stranger who is believed by the staff to be the mystery hotel critic. Hotel Deluxe is Chim's second appearance in a Vincent Kok-directed film, the first being Super Model.
- Janelle Sing as Sammy, a Receptionist for the Hundred Stars Hotel. This is Sing's first major acting role.

== Reception ==
Hotel Deluxe earned HK$19,469,958 at the Hong Kong box office.

Andrew Chan of the Film Critics Circle of Australia writes, "Hotel Deluxe is really light weight lunar new year entertainment that manages to be decent due to the calibre its experienced cast and crew. " South China Morning Post's Yvonne Teh similarly praised the ensemble cast and their "obvious willingness to do whatever is necessary to get their audience smiling, laughing and in good spirits." In a negative review for MovieXclusive.com, Gabriel Chong criticizes the film as "bland and uninspired", particularly blaming the cast for either appearing too uninterested or overacting.
