= Joyce Cheng =

Hong Kong actress and singer

- 鄭欣宜
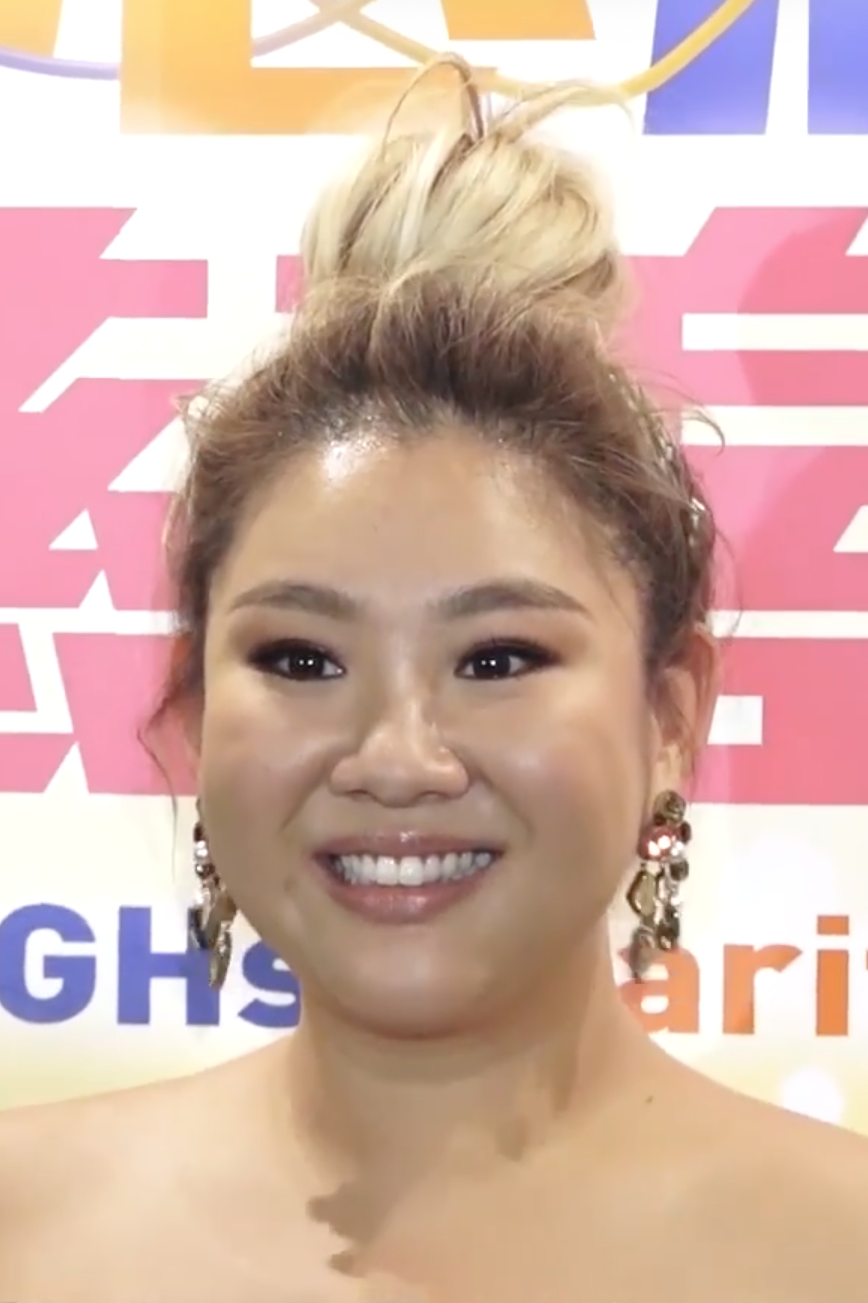
- Cheng attending Tung Wah Group of Hospitals Charity Dinner Show on 8 September 2018.
- Born: Joyce Cheng Yan-yee; May 30, 1987 (age 39); Vancouver, British Columbia, Canada
- Occupations: Actress; singer
- Years active: 1988–present
- Partner: Mark Ryan (2007–2012)
- Parents: Adam Cheng (father); Lydia Shum (mother)
- Musical career
- Origin: Hong Kong, China
- Genres: Cantopop, Mandopop
- Instruments: Vocals; piano
- Label: Media Asia Music

Chinese name
- Traditional Chinese: 鄭欣宜
- Simplified Chinese: 郑欣宜
Transcriptions
Standard Mandarin
- Hanyu Pinyin: Zhèng Xīnyí
Yue: Cantonese
- Jyutping: Zeng^{6} Jan^{1} Ji^{4}

Joyce Cheng Yan-yee (Chinese: 鄭欣宜; born May 30, 1987) is a Hong Kong-Canadian singer and actress.

== Career ==
Cheng was born to Hong Kong entertainers Lydia Shum and Adam Cheng. After her parents' separation, she was raised by her mother. She gained early media attention for her struggles with weight and published a memoir, My Weight Loss Diary, detailing her fitness journey beginning at age 16.

In 2005, she portrayed Snow White at the opening ceremony of Hong Kong Disneyland. Cheng released her first music video, "Depend on Myself" (靠自己), in 2006, and her debut album followed in 2011.

Cheng began acting in 2008 with a recurring role on the long-running TVB sitcom Off Pedder, also performing its theme song. She later starred in the drama Isolated Seven Day Romance.

Her 2015 single "Are You Skinny Enough?" (你瘦夠了嗎？) addressed body image and received critical acclaim. In 2016, "Girl God" (女神) became her breakthrough hit, earning widespread popularity and several music awards. Cheng has since released multiple singles, including “@princejoyce” in 2021, and held her first Hong Kong Coliseum concert in 2018. She ended her contract with TVB in 2017 and established of her own company, Passion Fruit Records, in 2018.

Since 2023, Cheng had been on a hiatus over nearly 2 years. In July 2025, she was expected to announce her return with Hunan TV’s Singer. However, during a promotional video shoot for the program, she sustained facial and shoulder injuries due to falling lighting equipment. She was immediately hospitalized and eventually had to withdraw from the show.

Passionfruit
- Parent company: hmv Digital China Group
- Founded: 2017
- Founder: Joyce Cheng
- Genre: Various
- Country of origin: China
- Location: Hong Kong

== Filmography ==
=== Film ===
Year	Title	Role
2010	72 Tenants of Prosperity	Shanghaiese Woman
2010	Little Gobie	
2011	I Love Hong Kong	One of the twins
2012	I Love Hong Kong 2012	
2012	Cold War	
2012	My Sassy Hubby	
2013	I Love Hong Kong 2013	
2014	Huat Ah! Huat Ah! HUAT! * heroine: Ah Niu	Xiao Ping
2015	12 Golden Ducks	
2015	Imprisoned: Survival Guide for Rich and Prodigal	
2015	Return of the Cuckoo	Keung
2015	Guia in Love	
2016	i am girl	
2016	Special Female Force	
2017	29+1	Wong Tin-lok
2017	The Yuppie Fantasia 3	June
2017	The Sinking City - Capsule Odyssey	
2018	Agent Mr Chan	
2018	Midnight Diner	
2019	A Home with a View	
2019	A Journey of Happiness	
2022	Life Must Go On	Kiki (Alfred Hui's wife), cameo

=== Television series ===
Year	Title	Network	
2008–2010	Off Pedder	TVB	Yu Lok-Yee (Joyce)
2011	7 Days in Life	TVB	Tong Ching
2017	Oh My Grad	TVB	Du Dehui
2019	Sexy Central	HMVOD, Netflix HK	Sunny

=== Television shows ===
Year	Title	Network	Role	Notes
2020	Taste of My Home	ViuTV	Host	
2020	King Maker III	ViuTV	Judge	EP31-35
2021	King Maker IV	ViuTV	Judge	EP28-31

=== Music video appearances ===
Year	Title
2021	Anson Lo - "Megahit"

== Discography ==
- (2011) Joyce Cheng Debut Album
- (2011) Supporting Role of the Story (故事的配角)
- (2013) The Voice of Love
- (2016) Joyce
- (2021) Joyce to the World
- (2023) Believe Us

== Concerts ==
Year	Date	Name	Venue	Notes/Ref.
2023	16-18 March	Believe Us	Hong Kong Coliseum	
2022	10-12 June	Between Us	Hong Kong Coliseum	

== Awards and nominations ==
Year	Award ceremony	Platform	Venue	Category	Result
2023	Ultimate Song Chart Awards Presentation 2022	CRHK	AsiaWorld–Arena, AsiaWorld–Expo	Best Female Singers	Gold
2023	Ultimate Song Chart Awards Presentation 2022	CRHK	AsiaWorld–Arena, AsiaWorld–Expo	Audience's Favourite Female Singer	Gold
2022	Ultimate Song Chart Awards Presentation 2021	CRHK	AsiaWorld–Arena, AsiaWorld–Expo	Best Female Singers	Gold
2022	Ultimate Song Chart Awards Presentation 2021	CRHK	AsiaWorld–Arena, AsiaWorld–Expo	Audience's Favourite Female Singer	Gold
