= 2026 Global OTT Awards =

Asian media awards ceremony

Korean Streaming International Festival 2026 — Global OTT Awards
- Official english poster
- Awarded for: The achievements of excellent content made for TV, OTT, and online across Asia
- Date: Opening: June 18, 2026; Global OTT Awards: June 20, 2026; Closing: June 21, 2026
- Venue: Outdoor Theater, Busan Cinema Center, Busan
- Country: South Korea
- Presented by: Ministry of Science and ICT; Busan Metropolitan City; Korea International Streaming Festival; National IT Industry Promotion Agency
- Hosted by: Ahn Jae-hyun; Kang So-ra

Highlights
- Most wins: The Price of Confession (2)
- Most nominations: Pursuit of Jade & Shine on Me (4)
- Best Creative: You and Everything Else
- Best OTT Original: The Price of Confession
- People's Choice Award (Male): Song Weilong
- People's Choice Award (Female): Tian Xiwei
- Website: www.kisf.kr/kor/

Television/radio coverage
- Network: YouTube; U+ Mobile TV

KISF 2026 Global OTT Awards (Korean: KISF 2026 글로벌OTT어워즈) is an upcoming awards ceremony scheduled for June 20, 2026, at the Outdoor Theater of the Busan Cinema Center. Organized to honor streaming content from around the world, the ceremony serves as the flagship event of the 2026 Korea International Streaming Festival (KISF) which runs from June 18 to 21, 2026.

The award ceremony features programs encompassing various genres, including dramas and entertainment shows, while highlighting the contributions of platforms, creators, and content producers. The organizing committee announced the nominees and entries for major categories on May 12, 2026.

The ceremony will be hosted by Ahn Jae-hyun and Kang So-ra, whose appointments were announced on April 29, 2026.

== Awards and nominations ==
Nominees and winners (winners will be denoted in bold):

Awards were announced on June 20, 2026.

=== Open competition ===
**Best Creative**	**Best OTT Original**
(South Korea) **You and Everything Else – Kakao Entertainment, Netflix**; (China) Born to Be Alive – Daylight Entertainment Co., Ltd.; (India) The Hunt: The Rajiv Gandhi Assassination Case – Applause Entertainment, Kukunoor Movies; (South Korea) Made in Korea – Disney+; (Japan) Passing the Reins – TBS Sparkle, TBS Television	(South Korea) **The Price of Confession – Production H, Netflix**; (Kazakhstan) Black Caviar – Unico Play; (South Korea) Gold Land – Disney+; (China) In the Name of Justice – Youku; (Japan) Scandal Eve – AbemaTV
**Best Asian TV Series**	**Best Reality & Variety**
(Philippines) **The Silent Noise – ABS-CBN Studios**; (Thailand) The Believers 2 – Deluxe Production Limited; (Taiwan) City Founding Pioneer – Hakka TV; (Japan) Hirayasumi – NHK; (China) Pursuit of Jade – Tencent Video, iQIYI, Haohan; (China) Shine on Me – Tencent Video, Xixi Pictures	(Japan) **Badly in Love – Staff Labbi, Netflix**; (Hong Kong) Alpine Love – MakerVille Company Limited; (South Korea) Culinary Class Wars 2 – SLL, Netflix; (South Korea) Just Makeup – Coupang Play; (South Korea) Physical: Asia – Teo, Netflix; (South Korea) The Village Barber – CJ ENM
**Best Director**	**Best Writer**
(China) **Li Xue – Born to Be Alive – Daylight Entertainment Co., Ltd.**; (Thailand) Wattanapong Wongwan – The Believers 2 – Deluxe Production Limited; (South Korea) Kim Sung-hoon – Gold Land – Disney+; (South Korea) Woo Min-ho – Made in Korea – Disney+; (Japan) Tsukahara Ayuko, Matsuda Ayato, Fukawa Ryosuke – Passing the Reins – TBS Sparkle, TBS Television	(South Korea) **Kwon Jong-gwan – The Price of Confession – Production H, Netflix**; (Taiwan) Wu Chi-en, Mark Chen – City Founding Pioneer – Hakka TV; (Japan) Tsutomu Kuroiwa – Reboot – TBS Sparkle, TBS Television; (South Korea) Song Hye-jin – You and Everything Else – Kakao Entertainment, Netflix
**Best Lead Actor**	**Best Lead Actress**
(Taiwan) **Tseng Jing-hua – Had I Not Seen the Sun – Netflix, Gala Television Corporation, Make A Deal International Production Co., Ltd.**; (South Korea) Kim Seon-ho – Can This Love Be Translated? – Imaginus, Netflix; (South Korea) Hyun Bin – Made in Korea – Disney+; (China) Song Weilong – Shine on Me – Tencent Video, Xixi Pictures; (Japan) Ryoma Takeuchi – Then You Try Making It! – TBS Sparkle, TBS Television	(South Korea) **Shin Hae-sun – The Art of Sarah – SLL, Netflix**; (South Korea) Kim Yoo-jung – Dear X – TVING; (South Korea) Park Bo-young – Gold Land – Disney+; (China) Tian Xiwei – Pursuit of Jade – Tencent Video, iQIYI, Haohan; (Japan) Ko Shibasaki – Scandal Eve – AbemaTV; (Philippines) Angelica Panganiban – The Silent Noise – ABS-CBN Studios
**Best Supporting Actor**	**Best Supporting Actress**
(South Korea) **Jung Sung-il – Made in Korea – Disney+**; (Hong Kong) Lokman Yeung – Before the End – MakerVille Company Limited; (Japan) Ren Meguro – Passing the Reins – TBS Sparkle, TBS Television; (China) Deng Kai – Pursuit of Jade – Tencent Video, iQIYI, Haohan; (South Korea) Kim Gun-woo – You and Everything Else – Kakao Entertainment, Netflix	(South Korea) **Nana – Climax – KT Studio Genie**; (South Korea) Lee E-dam – The Art of Sarah – SLL, Netflix; (China) Cai Wenjing – The Devil Between Us – iQIYI; (Japan) Nana Mori – Hirayasumi – NHK
**Best Newcomer Actor**	**Best Newcomer Actress**
(South Korea) **Lee Ki-taek – The Practical Guide to Love – SLL**; (China) Lin Muran – Dead End – iQIYI; (Thailand) Dechchart Tasilp – Head 2 Head – GMMTV; (Hong Kong) Benjamin Tsang– Justice Is Mine – Youku; (China) Lai Weiming – Shine on Me – Tencent Video, Xixi Pictures	(South Korea) **Bang Hyo-rin – Aema – The Lamp Co., Ltd., Netflix**; (China) **Leah Dou – Her – Tencent Video**; (Thailand) Rebecca Patricia Armstrong – Girl from Nowhere: The Reset – Gingerx; (Taiwan) Chiang Chi – Had I Not Seen the Sun – Netflix, Gala Television Corporation, Make A Deal International Production Co., Ltd.; (South Korea) Dahyun – Love Me – SLL
**Best Visual Effects**	**Best Original Song**
(Taiwan) **Agent from Above – Good Films Production Co., Ltd.**; (South Korea) Genie, Make a Wish – Netflix, Hwa&Dam Pictures, Studio Dragon; (China) Love Beyond the Grave – Tencent Video	(South Korea) **"Love Language" by Kim Min-seok – Can This Love Be Translated? – Imaginus, Netflix**; (China) "You Are Here Too" by Faye Wong and Leah Dou – Her – Tencent Video; (Japan) "Fanfare" by Koji Tamaki – Passing the Reins – TBS Sparkle, TBS Television; (China) "Careful with Fate" by JJ Lin – Pursuit of Jade – Tencent Video, iQIYI, Haohan; (China) "Coming for You" by Zhang Hao – Shine on Me – Tencent Video, Xixi Pictures

=== Invitation ===
**Rising Star of the Year**
(South Korea) **Dahyun – Love Me – SLL**; (Thailand) **Rebecca Patricia Armstrong – Girl from Nowhere: The Reset – Gingerx**; (South Korea) **Choi Mina Sue – Single's Inferno Season 5 – Shijak Company, Netflix**
**Creative Beyond Border**	**New Technology**
(South Korea) **Show Me the Money 12: Yaksha's World**	(South Korea) **LG Channels**
**Best Short-form of the Year**
(South Korea) **Dreaming Busan**
**People's Choice Award**
**Male**	**Female**
(China) **Song Weilong – Shine on Me – Tencent Video, Xixi Pictures**	(China) **Tian Xiwei – Pursuit of Jade – Tencent Video, iQIYI, Haohan**
