= Rampant (film) =

- Theatrical release poster
- Hangul: 창궐
- Hanja: 猖獗
- RR: Changgwol
- MR: Ch'anggwŏl
- Directed by: Kim Sung-hoon
- Written by: Hwang Jo-yoon
- Produced by: Kim Nam-soo
- Starring: Hyun Bin; Jang Dong-gun; Kim Eui-sung; Jung Man-sik; Lee Sun-bin; Jo Woo-jin; Seo Ji-hye; Kim Dae-gon
- Cinematography: Lee Sung-Jae
- Edited by: Kim Sang-beom
- Music by: Park In-young
- Production companies: Leeyang Film; Rear Window; VAST Entertainment & Media
- Distributed by: Next Entertainment World
- Release date: October 25, 2018
- Running time: 121 minutes
- Country: South Korea
- Languages: Korean; Mandarin; Dutch
- Budget: ₩17 billion (US$15 million)
- Box office: US$12.4 million

Rampant (Korean: 창궐) is a 2018 South Korean period post-apocalyptic action horror film directed by Kim Sung-hoon. It was released on October 25, 2018. The film features a clash between exiled prince Lee Chung (Hyun Bin) and the Joseon minister of War Kim Ja-joon (Jang Dong-gun) with the backdrop of a spreading zombie plague. It received mixed reviews from critics and was a box office bomb, grossing $12.4 million worldwide against a production budget of $15 million.

== Plot ==
In the Joseon period, King Lee Jo is considered by the Joseon nationalists as puppet to the Qing dynasty. His son, Crown Prince Lee Young, plots to buy European arquebuses to drive away the Qing. War Minister Kim Ja-joon, who holds influence over the king, discovers the plot and frames it as a rebellion. Kim meets the Europeans and learns that they have a crewman locked in a cell, slowly turning into a "demon".

Lee Young begs the king to oppose the Qing, as they now have firearms, but the impotent king refuses to listen. The prince commits suicide as penance so that his subordinates will be spared. Joseon forces destroy the European ship and retrieve the arquebuses, but a Joseon soldier is bitten by the zombie. He returns to his village, where he turns and spreads the infection. The zombies crave human meat and blood, are attracted by sounds, repelled by sunlight. They can be killed by decapitation, piercing of the heart, or the separation of spinal vertebrae; other methods of killing have limited success.

Lee Young left a request that his wife Gyeong-bin and unborn child be raised by his younger brother Lee Chung in China for their safety. Lee Chung, who had previously been left out of Joseon's order of succession, grew up abroad in the prosperous Qing. Lee Chung returns with his companion Hak-Su, landing in Jemulpo, but is attacked by Joseon assassins sent by Minister Kim and other ministers, who are plotting a coup. The noise attracted a mob of zombie villagers. Lee Chung and Hak-Su are assisted by local partisans, including Park Eul-ryoung, Lee Young's former lieutenant, and archer Deok-hee. The Jemulpo partisans ask Lee Chung to become crown prince, but he declines, wanting to return to China. Lee Chung awkwardly flirts with Deok-hee.

The only survivor of the would-be assassins is captured by Kim because he is infected. The ministers let the assassin infect a concubine, who later infects the king. Lee Chung arrives at the king's court, where he requests an army to crush the zombies. The paranoid king initially agrees as long Lee Chung does not want the throne, but the ministers instigate him to rescind the order, claiming no zombie outbreak, only a civil rebellion. The Jemulpo partisans are arrested, while Lee Chung and Gyeong-bin are ordered to attend a banquet for a visiting Qing delegation.

At the banquet, the king fully turns into a zombie. Kim slays him and unleashes zombies in an attempt to kill the opposition along with the Qing delegation. However, Kim is bitten by a zombie and cornered by the other ministers. Kim slays them all, chops off his hand to slow the infection, then madly declares himself king.

Gyeong-bin convinces Lee Chung not to flee but to protect the people, so Lee Chung, the royal guard and his Jemulpo allies freed from prison proceed to fight to prevent the zombies from escaping the palace and attacking the capital. Lee Chung and his allies plan to draw the zombies together into a gigantic fiery explosion at the palace, but Kim kills Hak-Su and an infected Park, preventing the explosion. Lee Chung continues the plan, battling a horde of zombies and Kim, and scatters oil on the floor of the palace. Deok-hee fires a flaming arrow into the palace, which Lee Chung uses to ignite the oil, burning the palace down.

Lee Chung retreats to the roof of the palace, only to find that Kim also climbed the palace. They duel each other, with Lee Chung being the victor, and reinforcements of soldiers and commoners arrive soon after to exterminate the rest of the zombies .

Lee Chung recognizes that through the power of the people, the ruined Joseon still has hopes for existence. He chooses to stay to lead his people as the new king rather than go back to China. Lee Chung leads his troops to eliminate the remaining zombies at the port where they first appeared.

== Cast ==
=== Main ===
- Hyun Bin as Lee Chung – the current heir to the Joseon throne, who is arrogant and only wants to marry a girl to accompany to China
- Jang Dong-gun as Kim Ja-joon – the corrupt Minister of War who leads the Royal Family into believing Lee Chung is not the heir

=== Supporting ===
- Kim Eui-sung as King Lee Jo, the king of Joseon who delights in luxury
- Jeong Man-sik as Hak-soo, Lee Chung's quirky bodyguard
- Jo Woo-jin as Park Eul-ryoung, one of the three protectors of Jemulpo who accompanies Chung during the virus
- Lee Sun-bin as Deok-hee, an archer and the second protector of Jemulpo who Lee Chung has a crush on
- Seo Ji-hye as Concubine Jo
- Kim Dae-gon as Royal Court Physician
- Jo Dal-hwan as Monk Dae-gil, the third protector of Jemulpo who follows Buddhist religion
- Han Ji-eun as Royal Noble Consort Gyeong
- Heo Joon-suk
- Jung Yoo-ahn

=== Special appearance ===
- Kim Tae-woo as Crown Prince Lee Young

== Production ==
Principal photography began on September 1, 2017 and concluded on February 13, 2018.

The film is financed and distributed by Next Entertainment World, who was the primary backer of films such as Pandora and Train to Busan. It is directed by Kim Sung-hoon, who has worked with Hyun Bin in the hit film Confidential Assignment. On November 14, 2017, it was announced by distributor Next Entertainment World that actor Kim Tae-woo will fill the role of Crown Prince Lee Young, originally scheduled to be played by the late Kim Joo-hyuk.

== Release ==
The film was released domestically on October 25, 2018, alongside Grass and Hollywood film Crazy Rich Asians.

The film had already lined up theatrical releases in 19 countries. Release date for Philippines, Germany, UK, Vietnam, Myanmar, Singapore, Hong Kong, Macau, Thailand, Australia, New Zealand, US, Canada, Laos, Malaysia, Indonesia, and Cambodia is set within 2 weeks after domestic release date.

== Reception ==
=== Critical response ===
Shim Sun-ah from Yonhap News Agency gave a mixed review and wrote, "Rampant has a promising premise, but it is a bland film that is marred by a predictable plot and cardboard characters. However, the movie much to the satisfaction of fans of zombie movies, they are quick, strong and cruel, not to mention creepy. It also succeeded in giving audiences spectacular sword-fight sequences and some truly beautiful cinematography."

Park Jin-hae from The Korea Times also gave a mixed review and wrote, "Hyun's skillful action scenes with a long sword, almost singlehandedly defeating zombies endlessly swarming from all directions, are entertaining. It keeps viewers on the edge of their seats with nerve-wracking moments to the last. But the film seems to work adversely as loosening up the thrill and chills the zombies worked hard to create. Another letdown has been lack of character development."

=== Box office ===
The film recorded 156,644 admissions with US$1.1 million gross on its opening day, taking the box office lead from Dark Figure of Crime. On October 28, the film surpassed 1 million admissions, 4 days after its release. During its opening weekend, the film attracted 840,854 moviegoers with US$6.6 million gross, and finished first place at the box office. However, the film dropped 80% in gross during its second weekend, with US$1.4 million gross from 174,993 attendance, and finished third in the box office chart.

As of November 18, 2018, the film grossed US$11.8 million from 1,596,255 total attendance.
