= Gold Land =

2026 South Korean television series

- Promotional poster
- Hangul: 골드랜드
- RR: Goldeu raendeu
- MR: Koldŭ raendŭ
- Genre: Crime thriller
- Written by: Hwang Jo-yoon
- Directed by: Kim Sung-hoon
- Starring: Park Bo-young; Kim Sung-cheol; Lee Hyun-wook; Kim Hee-won; Moon Jung-hee; Lee Kwang-soo
- Music by: Kim Woo-geon
- Opening theme: "Gold Land" by: Kim Woo-geun; Seo Ga-ui
- Country of origin: South Korea
- Original language: Korean
- No. of episodes: 10

Production
- Executive producers: Jang Kyung-ik; Yoo Sang-ayon; Kim Sung-hoon; Kim Ryoon-hee; Lee Ji-min; Yoon Suk-dong
- Producers: Kim Ga-hye; Kim Ha-kyung
- Cinematography: Kim Hyung-suk; Yang Hee-jin
- Editor: Kung Ji-eun
- Running time: 53–68 minutes
- Production companies: Studio Dragon; Lee-Chang Films

Original release
- Network: Hulu (Disney+)
- Release: April 29 – May 27, 2026

Gold Land (Korean: 골드랜드) is a 2026 South Korean crime thriller television series written by Hwang Jo-yoon, directed by Kim Sung-hoon, and starring Park Bo-young, Kim Sung-cheol, Lee Hyun-wook, Kim Hee-won, Moon Jeong-hee, and Lee Kwang-soo. It was released on Hulu and Disney+ on April 29, 2026.

== Synopsis ==
Hee-joo, a woman seeking to escape a lifetime of hardship, acquires ₩150 billion in gold bars through a dangerous plan orchestrated by her lover, Do-kyung, whom she believes to be her salvation. Hoping the fortune will allow her to start over, she goes into hiding in the old mining town of Jeongsan, where painful memories from her past still linger.

As news of the gold spreads, it ignites the greed of those connected to the hotel casino Gold Land, drawing ruthless criminals into a relentless pursuit of Hee-joo. With pursuers, deceivers, and betrayers becoming entangled in an increasingly deadly struggle, she comes to realize that neither love nor promises can save her. Hee-joo must decide whether to abandon everything and flee or risk her life to protect the gold that represents her only chance at survival.

== Cast ==
- Park Bo-young as Kim Hee-joo
  - Oh Eun-seo as young Kim Hee-joo
- Kim Sung-cheol as "Woogi"/Jang Wook
- Lee Hyun-wook as Lee Do-kyung
- Lee Kwang-soo as Park Ho-cheol
- Kim Hee-won as Kim Jin-man
- Moon Jeong-hee as Yeo Seon-ok

== Production ==
=== Development ===
The series was officially commissioned by Disney+, with Kim Sung-hoon serving as director, who helmed Confidential Assignment (2017) and the script is penned by Hwang Jo-yoon, who wrote Oldboy (2003), while Studio Dragon and Lee-Chang films managed the production.

=== Casting ===
In November 2024, it was reported that Park Bo-young was offered the lead role of the series. In February 2025, it was reported that Kim Sung-cheol joined the series. In June 2025, Disney+ confirmed that the series "Gold land" would premiere in 2026. The cast was also confirmed, including Park Bo-young, Kim Sung-chul, Lee Hyun-wook, Kim Hee-won, Moon Jung-hee, and Lee Kwang-soo.

=== Filming ===
The script reading was held on May 29, 2025. Principal photography of the series commenced in August 2025. Later on, Park Bo-young joined the shoot. Filming wrapped in January 2026.

== Original soundtrack ==
=== Part 1 ===
Released on April 30, 2026
No.	Title	Artist	Length
1.	"Afterglow"	Kevin Oh	4:04
2.	"Afterglow (Inst.)"	Kevin Oh	4:04

== Release ==
In November 2025, Disney+ revealed its slate lineup for 2026. The series premiered on Hulu (Disney+) on April 29, 2026, airing every Wednesday.

== Reception ==
=== Critical response ===
iMBC gave the series a three-star rating out of three. Archi Sengupta of Leisure Byte rated the series 3/5 stars. Jasmine Ong of Nylon Singapore and Pierce Conran of South China Morning Post reviewed the series.

== Accolades ==
Name of the award ceremony, year presented, category, nominee of the award, and the result of the nomination
Award ceremony	Year	Category	Nominee	Result	Ref.
Global OTT Awards	2026	Best OTT Original	Gold Land	Nominated	
Global OTT Awards	2026	Best Actress	Park Bo-young	Nominated	
Global OTT Awards	2026	Best Director	Kim Sung-hoon	Nominated	
Blue Dragon Series Awards	2026	Best Actress	Park Bo-young	Nominated	
Blue Dragon Series Awards	2026	Best Supporting Actor	Lee Kwang-soo	Nominated	
Blue Dragon Series Awards	2026	Best Supporting Actress	Moon Jeong-hee	Nominated	
Daejeon Special FX Film Festival (DFX OTT Awards)	2026	Best Actor	Kim Sung-cheol	Won	
