= My Little Hero =

- Theatrical release poster
- Directed by: Kim Sung-hoon
- Written by: Ahn Ho-kyoung
- Produced by: Choi Nak-kwon; Kim Rea Won
- Starring: Kim Rae-won; Ji Dae-han; Jo An
- Cinematography: Kim Yeong-min
- Edited by: Lee Jin
- Music by: Lee Ji-soo
- Production companies: CJ Entertainment; Good Choice Cut Pictures
- Distributed by: CJ Entertainment
- Release date: May 29, 2013
- Running time: 135 minutes
- Country: South Korea
- Language: Korean

My Little Hero, also known as A Wonderful Moment, is a 2013 Korean film directed by Kim Sung-hoon. The film follows an amateur music director, Yoo II-Han and a group of kids pursuing a career in acting. Yoo's desire to become famous leads him to audition for the role of The King in an upcoming Broadway-bound musical film, The Great King Jung-Jo. During the audition he meets and partners with a mixed-heritage child Young Kwang and experiences the first conflict between his aspirations and public views.

== Plot ==
The protagonists in this movie are a 30-year-old musical director named Yoo Il-Han and a young boy, Young Kwang. Yoo II-Han claims to have graduated from Manhattan University but, in reality, he dropped out due to lack of funds. After that, he returned to work in Korea where he produced a failed musical performance. He messed up a big investment musical. During their performance, there was almost no audience. Following that, he could only produce children's dramas.

The other protagonist is Young Kwang, a mixed-race child of South Korean and Filipino heritage. His family came to Korea for a better life, but they were abandoned by his father. Because he is of mixed-race, his skin color is darker than other children's. He often suffers from unfair treatment and occasional bullying. He wants his father back. He is gifted with a spectacular voice. Young-Kwang dreams of singing on television so that his father can see him.

Young Kwang signs up for a music talent show. By coincidence, Yoo II-Han is given the opportunity to participate in the same show after another music director temporarily withdraws. In the competition, the producer wants to find a child actor to play the role of King of Korea. Five music directors are invited as mentors, all of whom are famous artists except Yoo. Each of them chooses a child to train and perform with. The contestants are chosen through blind votes meaning that the music directors can only choose their team by judging voices.

Yoo and Young Kwang form a duo. At first, Yoo does not want to be in the same group as the little boy due his skin color. The purpose of this program is to find a Korean child as a representative. Yoo believes that the boy could never win the competition, and he thinks of quitting.

Young Kwang knows that the other contestants are more experienced than him. Rather than giving up, Young Kwang only trains harder, practicing day and night. He becomes physically worn out. In the beginning, Young Kwang practiced alone, but then Yoo begins training with him. Eventually, they develop a close friendship.

The duo makes rapid progress and receives recognition from the audience. However, success leads to bigger. The producers think that the appearance of the boy is not suitable for the role of the King. The producers want to cancel Young Kwang's qualification. When Yoo hears the news, he becomes angry and argues with the producers to no avail. In the end, he begs another mentor to help Young Kwang finish the show.

The film ends with a performance on Broadway, New York, USA.

== Production ==
Filming began on March 25, 2012 and finished September 16, 2012 in New York City. The initial Korean title of the film was "Dream". It then changed to "Dream, My Little Hero", and then to "Superstar". The final choice was "My Little Hero". The movie did not perform well at the box office in South Korea, selling sold 183,650 tickets during its theatrical run.

The film was directed by Kim Seong hun.

== Cast ==
Actor	Role
Kim Rae-won	Yoo II Han
Ji Dae-han	Young Kwang (Glory)
Jo An	Sung Hee
Hwang Yong-yeon	Sung Joon
Kim Sung-eun	Show Host
Lee Kwang-soo	Jung II
Lee Sung-min	Hee Suk
Park Sung-taek	Kim Pil Sung (Young Gwang's father)
Han Sa-myung	Aid room engineer
Song Wook-kyung	Thunder Man member
Hong In	Villain captain
Im Chul-hyung	Choi Ho Jin
Kim Kang-iI	General manager
Lee Min-ah	Choi Hoon's mother
Lee Chung-mi	Thunderman member 'Butterfly'
Kim Won-hae	Ha PD

== Reception ==
The movie overall received good reviews. One review found that the audience was touched by the charm of Yoo II-Han. The background music and stage performance of the movie were praised.
