= Kim Dae-gon (actor) =

South Korean actor

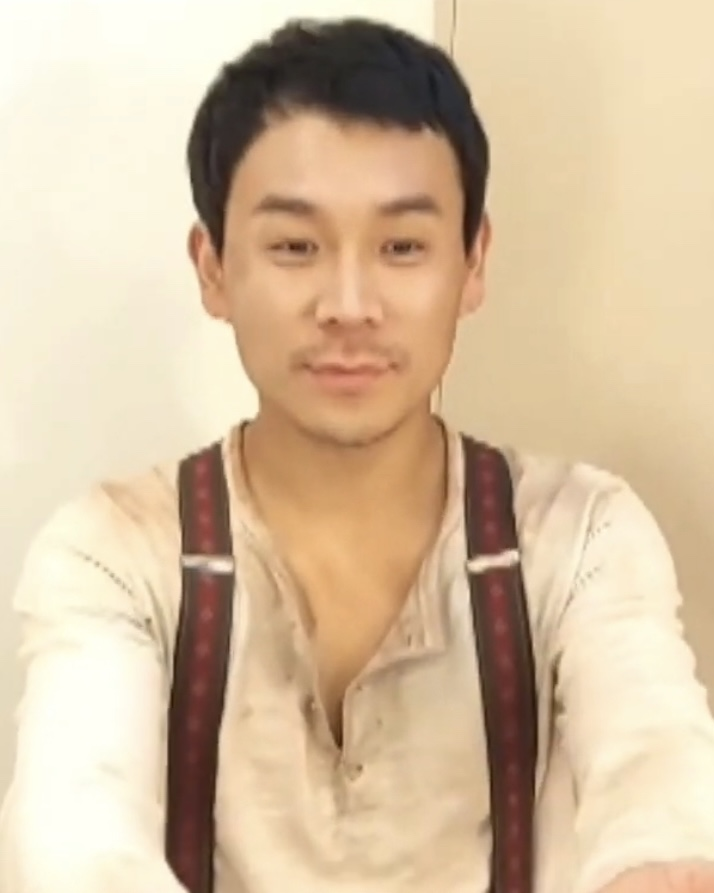
- Kim in 2019
- Born: Kim Dae-gon; 13 December 1983 (age 42); South Korea
- Other name: Gim Dae-gon
- Occupation: Actor
- Years active: 2016–present
- Agent: LFNT Entertainment
- Spouse: Unknown (m. 2022)

Korean name
- Hangul: 김대곤
- RR: Gim Daegon
- MR: Kim Taegon

Kim Dae-gon (Korean: 김대곤; born December 13, 1983) is a South Korean actor. He is known for his roles in dramas such as Touch Your Heart, My Country: The New Age and Hi Bye, Mama!.

== Personal life ==
On June 30, 2022, the agency confirmed that Kim would marry his non-celebrity girlfriend in October 2022.

== Filmography ==
=== Film ===
Year	Title	Role	Ref.
2016	If You Were Me 7	Physical education teacher	
2018	Snatch Up	Jjak Dae-gi	
2018	Roooom	Park-yoon	
2018	A Tiger in Winter	Fast-food restaurant manager	
2018	Rampant	Royal Court Physician	
2019	The Beast	Detective	
2019	Tune in for Love	Real estate agency owner	
2019	Start-Up	Police	
2022	Paroho	Ho Seung	
2022	Kill Me Now	Police Officer	
2024	Dirty Money	Mr. Kang	

=== Television series ===
Year	Title	Role	Ref.
2016	A Beautiful Mind	Kim-min	
2017	Saimdang, Memoir of Colors	Jung-soo	
2017	Manhole	Jang-hye	
2018	Cross	Jae-hyun	
2018	Life on Mars	Park Byung-doo	
2019	Drama Stage – "My Uncle is Audrey Hepburn"	Jang-mi	
2019	Touch Your Heart	Park Soo-myung	
2019	Voice	Seung	
2019	When the Camellia Blooms	Shaman performing funeral	
2019	Vagabond	Ui Jeong's father	
2019	My Country: The New Age	Kang-kae	
2020	Hi Bye, Mama!	Jang Dae-choon	
2020	Hospital Playlist	Gal Ba-ram's husband	
2021	Sell Your Haunted House	Oh Seong-sik	
2021	Hometown Cha-Cha-Cha	Rottiserie Chicken Seller (cameo)	
2021	Taxi Driver	Madame Lim's employee	
2022	Shooting Stars	Han Dae-soo	
2022	Alchemy of Souls	a merchant; Cameo (episode 1)	
2023	Agency	Kwon Woo-cheol	
2023	Vigilante	Jang Soon-do	
2023	Welcome to Samdal-ri	An Kang-hyun	
2026	Perfect Crown	Logistics manager of Castle Beauty; Cameo (episode 1)	

=== Music video appearances ===
Year	Song title	Artist	Ref.
2022	"'The Island Where the Sea Lives" (바다가 사는 섬)	Tei	

== Theater ==
Year	English title	Korean title	Role	Ref.
2023	Friends of the World	세상친구	Man-seok	
2023	Paris Bakery	빠리빵집	Yeon-jun	
