= Too Hot to Die =

- Theatrical release poster
- Hangul: 배반의 장미
- RR: Baebanui jangmi
- MR: Paebanŭi changmi
- Directed by: Park Jin-young
- Written by: Son Geun-joo
- Produced by: Yang Chang-hoon
- Starring: Kim In-kwon; Jung Sang-hoon; Son Dam-bi; Kim Sung-chul; Park Chul-min
- Cinematography: Kim Jae-sung
- Edited by: Kim Woo-hyun
- Music by: Kim Woo-chul
- Production company: Taewon Entertainment
- Distributed by: Lotte Entertainment
- Release date: October 18, 2018
- Running time: 99 minutes
- Country: South Korea
- Language: Korean

Too Hot to Die (formerly known as That Night, Korean: 그날밤에; RR: geunalbame) is a 2018 South Korean comedy film directed by Park Jin-young. It was previously set to be released in August 2018, before being pushed to October 18, 2018.

== Premise ==
Three men and a woman who claim their lives are the saddest in the world decide to end their lives at the same time together. But the plan doesn't go as it should, as their shocking pasts start to be revealed.

== Cast ==
- Kim In-kwon as Byung-nam
- Jung Sang-hoon as Shim-sun
- Son Dam-bi as Mi-ji
- Kim Sung-cheol as Doo-seok
- Park Chul-min as Kwang-ki
- Shin Hyun-joon (special appearance)
- Tak Jae-hoon (special appearance)

== Production ==
Principal photography began on March 3, 2018, and wrapped on April 2, 2018.

== Release ==
The film was released on October 18, 2018, alongside Hollywood films First Man and A.X.L..
