= Where the Mask Ends =

2026 Chinese television series

- Also known as: Marriage of the Golden Hairpin
- Simplified Chinese: 嫁金钗
- Hanyu Pinyin: Jià jīn chāi
- Genre: Romance; Historical drama; Political drama
- Based on: Jia Jin Chai by Xiao Jia Ren
- Written by: Zhou Mo
- Directed by: Yang Long
- Starring: Tian Xiwei; Yan An
- Country of origin: China
- Original language: Mandarin
- No. of episodes: 30

Production
- Running time: 45–55 minutes

Original release
- Network: CCTV-8; Youku; Netflix
- Release: 16 October 2026 – present

Where the Mask Ends (Chinese: 嫁金钗; pinyin: Jià jīn chāi; lit "Marriage of the Golden Hairpin") is a 2026 Chinese television series starring Tian Xiwei and Yan An. Directed by Yang Long and written by Zhou Mo, the series is adapted from the novel Jia Jin Chai by Xiao Jia Ren. It premiered on CCTV-8 and Youku on 16 October 2026. It also streams on Netflix outside China, with new episodes released daily.

== Synopsis ==
Wei Rao (Tian Xiwei), a noble daughter, is betrothed to Lu Zhuo (Yan An), the heir of Duke Ying. To bring him good fortune and save his life after a battlefield injury leaves Lu Zhuo bedridden, their wedding is moved forward. Fearing she will become a widow, Wei Rao finds A Chou (Tian Xiwei), a lowly night soil collector who bears a striking resemblance to her, to be a stand-in bride and take her place.

Eager for a fresh start, A Chou accepts the offer, but her plans unravel when Lu Zhuo unexpectedly awakens. With him now healthy, Wei Rao seeks to eliminate A Chou, while Lu Zhuo suspects her of being a scheming woman and keeps her under close watch.

Behind the household's peaceful facade lie deadly schemes and hidden traps. As A Chou navigates its dangerous rivalries and fights for her own future, she uncovers the secret of her birth, reunites with her family, and builds a prosperous life on her own terms.

== Cast ==
=== Main ===
- Tian Xiwei as Wei Rao / A Chou / Jundai
- Yan An as Lu Zhuo, heir of Duke Ying whose courtesy name is Shoucheng

=== Supporting ===
- Wang Yinan as Guo Yufeng, Wei Rao's aunt
- Yin Wenxuan as A Man
- Mao Linlin as Zhou Fu, Wei Rao's birth mother
- Kong Lin as Duchess Ying
- Dai Gaozheng as Han Liao
- Liu Xiaobei as Qi Zhongkai
- Tien Niu as Lady Shao'an, Wei Rao's maternal grandmother
- Yang Qing as Old Madam Wei, Wei Rao's grandmother
- Li Youchuan as Huo Wei, Wei Rao's maternal cousin
- Pan Junya as Bitao, Wei Rao's maid

=== Extended ===
- Zheng Hao as Lou Shou
- Wang Yizhou as Jiede, Lu Zhuo's servant
- Hu Chunyang as Lu Zong, Lu Zhuo's cousin; 2nd branch
- Wang Yiren as Guanzhu, servant in Duke of Ying manor
- Su Xiaotong as Wei Chan, Wei Rao's cousin
- Estelle Chen as Wei Mei
- Zhou Zhan as Liu Shuo
- Jiang Kai as Duke Ying, Lu Zhuo's grandfather
- Jin Tianruyi as Hongxian
- Chen Zihan as Wei Heng'e
- Yang Yutong as Xie Hualou
- Dai Jiaoqian as Ren Yuzhen
- Su Qi as Lu Changhui
- Zheng Jiahui as Lu Changning
- Zeng Yixuan as Kong Yingshu
- Cui Yi as He Wanniang, Lu Zhuo's mother
- Chen Sisi as Zhou Chengjun
- Dai Chunrong as Empress Dowager
- Zhang Yuanyu as Governess Chang
- Gao Maoyong as Lu Ya
- Zhong Xinghui as Xiao
- Huang Haibing as Emperor
- Zhang Yameng as Grand Princess
- Shen Tai as Prince Rong
- Sean Zheng as Crown Prince
- Yin Wenxuan as Ah Man
- Ge Xingjia as Attendant Zhang (Steward)
