= Deng Kai (actor) =

Chinese actor (born 1995)

- Born: Deng Shang; February 8, 1995 (age 31); Dalian, Liaoning, China
- Education: Luxun Academy of Fine Arts
- Occupation: Actor
- Years active: 2018–present
- Height: 189 cm (6 ft 2 1/2 in)

Chinese name
- Simplified Chinese: 邓凯

Deng Shang (Chinese: 邓尚, born February 8, 1995), professionally known as Deng Kai (Chinese: 邓凯), is a Chinese actor. He gained widespread recognition for playing the role of Qi Min in the series Pursuit of Jade (2026). He is also known for his roles in Butterflied Lover (2023), and Love of the Divine Tree (2025).

== Filmography ==
=== Television series ===
Year	Title	Role	Notes	Ref.
2018	Secret of the Three Kingdoms	Xu Fu		
2019	River Flows to You	Gu Wenyuan		
2019	Chasing Ball	Lin Ran		
2020	Break Up Battle	Xia Dong		
2021	Unrequited Love	Ge Bi		
2021	The Blessed Girl	Tie Luo		
2021	Dream Box!	Xu Shaoqian		
2021	Proof of Silence	Wang Zi		
2022	The Blood of Youth	Xiao Yu / Prince Chi		
2023	Taste of Love	Huang Fujue		
2023	Destined	Wang Rong	Guest appearance	
2023	Butterflied Lover	Ling Changjin		
2023	Stand By Me	Feng Guanyu		
2023	Embrace Love	Lu Feiyan		
2023	Governor's Secret Love	Murong Cang / Du Gong		
2024	Broken the Heart	Yu Wensheng		
2024	Follow Your Heart	Yan Biqing		
2024	Wind Direction	Gao Feiyang		
2025	Love of the Divine Tree	Wei Jiu		
2025	Ruan Xiaofeng's Royal Love Quest	Li Rui		
2025	Accidental Firing	Lu Yan		
2025	Doppelganger	Shen Que		
2025	The Wanted Detective	Zhuge Kongyun		
2025	The Maid	Pei Ji		
2026	Unveil: Jadewind	Li Duo / Prince Heng	Guest appearance	
2026	Pursuit of Jade	Qi Min / Sui Yuanhuai		
TBA	Mei Gui Lie Shou	Zhou Xubai		
TBA	Huan Yan	Zhao Xiao		
TBA	Liao Zhai	Nanshan Weng		
TBA	Zhao Hua Jin			
TBA	The Noble			
