= Tian Xiwei =

Chinese actress (born 1997)

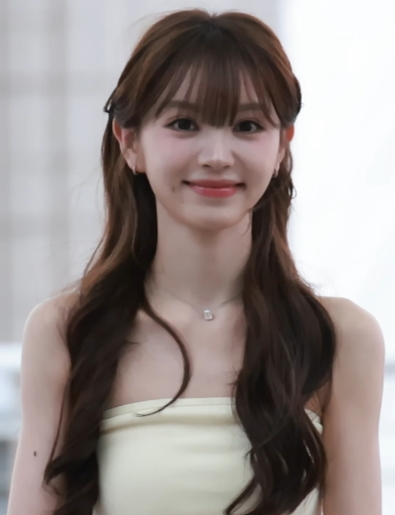
- Tian in 2026
- Born: October 14, 1997 (age 29); Chongqing, China
- Other name: Vivian
- Education: Shanghai Theatre Academy
- Occupation: Actress
- Years active: 2018–present
- Agent: Star Agency
- Height: 168.5 cm (5 ft 6 1/2 in)

Chinese name
- Simplified Chinese: 田曦薇
- Hanyu Pinyin: Tián Xīwēi

Tian Xiwei (Chinese: 田曦薇; pinyin: Tián Xīwēi, born October 14, 1997) is a Chinese actress. She is known for her lead roles in New Life Begins (2022), Wrong Carriage, Right Groom (2023), Guardians of the Dafeng (2024), Moonlit Reunion (2025), and Pursuit of Jade (2026).

== Early life ==
Tian was born on 14 October 1997, in Tongliang District, Chongqing, China. She graduated from Shanghai Theatre Academy, where she majored in drama to pursue her acting career.

== Career ==
=== 2018–2021: Beginnings ===
In 2018, Tian made her television debut as lead in iQIYI's youth drama Waiting for You in the Long Time. In 2019, she appeared in the romance drama My True Friend, portraying a newcomer to the real estate industry. She subsequently appeared in Tencent Video's 2020 historical romance series The Song of Glory and Lovely Us. In 2021, she starred in Youku's romance drama My Fated Boy.

=== 2022–present: Rising popularity ===
In 2022, Tian appeared in the historical romantic comedy series New Life Begins, which achieved international recognition and became one of the fastest dramas on iQIYI to reach a popularity index of 10,000. In 2024, she made her debut as voice actor for character "Sophie Hatter" in the Chinese dub of the animated film Howl's Moving Castle. She also starred in the historical fantasy adventure series Guardians of the Dafeng, which surpassed a popularity index of 30,000 on Tencent Video.

In 2026, Tian starred in the historical romance series Pursuit of Jade. The series was an international commercial success; within a week of its broadcast, it exceeded a popularity heat index of 31,000 on Tencent and 10,000 on iQIYI. It ranked 6th on Netflix's Global Top 10 Non-English Shows.

== Ambassadorship ==
Tian has served as a brand ambassador for several companies, including the French perfume brand Guerlain, Chinese mobile phone manufacturer Vivo, American clothing brand Victoria's Secret, and American sandwich cookie brand Oreo. She is the Chinese brand ambassador for Italian fashion house Gucci and attended the brand's 2025 Spring/Summer show at Milan Fashion Week. She endorses Chinese skincare brand Lan and is a brand spokesperson for sportswear label Panda Outdoor. She has appeared in fashion magazines such as Grazia, L'Officiel, and Elle.

== Influence ==
During the World Environment Day in 2020, Tian responded to the call of the Central Committee of the Communist Youth League of China for "Beautiful China Youth Action" campaign and spoke out for ecological civilization.

== Filmography ==
=== Television series ===
Year	Title		Role	Ref.
Year	English	Chinese	Role	Ref.
2018	Waiting for You in a Long Time	在悠长的时光里等你	Luo Xi	
2019	My True Friend	我的真朋友	Xi Shan	
2020	The Song of Glory	锦绣南歌	Lu Wan	
2020	Lovely Us	如此可爱的我们	Huang Chengzi	
2021	Be My Cat	我的宠物少将军	Su Xiaohe / Xiao Bohe / Qing Ziyou	
2021	My Fated Boy	我的邻居长不大	Li Tian	
2022	Ms. Cupid in Love	姻缘大人请留步	Shangguan Ya / Xiao Ya	
2022	Guo's Summer	张卫国的夏天	You Qian	
2022	New Life Begins	卿卿日常	Li Wei	
2022	First Love	初次爱你	Lu Wanwan	
2023	Wrong Carriage, Right Groom	花轿喜事	Li Yuhu	
2023	Romance on the Farm	田耕纪	Lian Maner	
2024	Guardians of the Dafeng	大奉打更人	Lin An	
2024	In Between	半熟男女	He Zhinan	
2025	Moonlit Reunion	子夜归	Wu Zhen	
2026	Pursuit of Jade	逐玉	Fan Changyu	
2026	Born with Luck	低智商犯罪	Li Qian	
2026	Genius Girlfriend	天才女友	Lin Zhixia	
2026	Where the Mask Ends	嫁金钗	Wei Rao / Ah Chou	

=== Dubbing works ===
Year	Title	Character	Notes	Ref.
2024	Howl's Moving Castle	Sophie	Mandarin dub	Ref.

== Awards and nominations ==
Year	Ceremony	Category	Nominee / Work	Result	Ref.
2022	iQIYI Scream Night	Potential Actress of the Year	New Life Begins	Won	
2022	Weibo Awards	Weibo Enterprising Actor of the Year	New Life Begins	Won	
2023	Tencent Video Star Awards	Breakthrough Artist of the Year	Tian Xiwei	Won	
2024	Tencent Video Star Awards	Notable Artist of the Year	Tian Xiwei	Won	
2024	Weibo TV & Internet Video Summit	Most Anticipated Actor of the Year	Tian Xiwei	Won	
2024	iQIYI Scream Night	Asia Pacific Annual Progressive Actor	Tian Xiwei	Won	
2025	iQIYI Scream Night	Asia Pacific Audience's Favourite Actor of the Year	Tian Xiwei	Won	
2025	Tencent Video Star Awards	Expressive Artist of the Year	Tian Xiwei	Won	
2026	International Streaming Festival	Best Actress	Pursuit of Jade	Nominated	
2026	Global OTT Awards	People's Choice Award: Female	Pursuit of Jade	Won	
