= Kim Sung-cheol =

South Korean actor (born 1991)

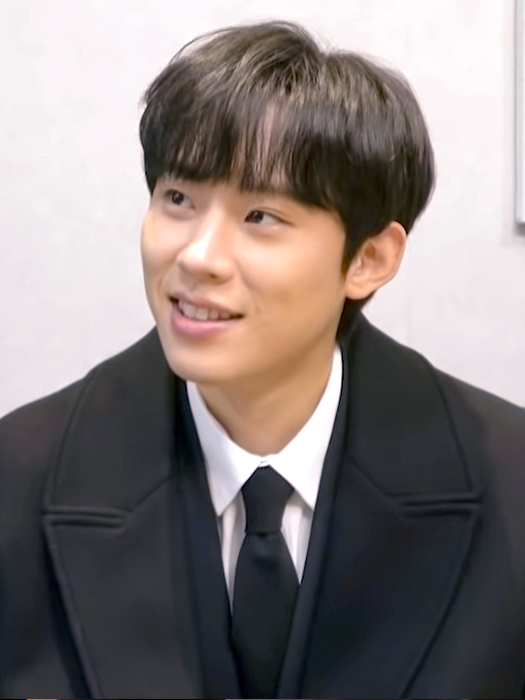
- Kim in October 2020
- Born: December 31, 1991 (age 34); Seoul, South Korea
- Education: Korea National University of Arts – Department of Acting
- Occupation: Actor
- Years active: 2014–present
- Agent: Story J Company

Korean name
- Hangul: 김성철
- RR: Gim Seongcheol
- MR: Kim Sŏngch'ŏl

Kim Sung-cheol (Korean: 김성철; born December 31, 1991) is a South Korean actor. He achieved initial success in stage musicals before being cast in his debut television role as Kim Young-cheol (a.k.a. 'Jailbird') in Prison Playbook (2017). He is recognised for his roles in The Battle of Jangsari (2019), Do You Like Brahms? (2020), Our Beloved Summer (2021), and Hellbound (2024).

== Career ==
Kim made his debut in the musical Puberty in 2014. In the following years, he appeared in various musicals including My Bucket List, Werther and Fan Letter. For his performance as Tobias Ragg in the 2016 Korean production of Sweeney Todd, he received the award for Best Rookie Actor at the Korea Musical Awards.

In 2017, Kim made his television debut in Prison Playbook.

In 2018, Kim starred in the musical rom-com To. Jenny opposite Jung Chae-yeon. Kim also joined in the film Too Hot to Die. In October 2018, Kim joined the drama OCN Player.

In 2019, Kim acted in the JTBC drama The Wind Blows as well as the tvN series Arthdal Chronicles. He also starred in the war film The Battle of Jangsari, for which he won a Best New Actor award in the 27th Korean Culture and Entertainment Awards. The same year, Kim played a supporting role in the film Kim Ji-young: Born 1982.

In 2020, Kim appeared in the SBS drama Do You Like Brahms?, earning him a nomination for Best New Actor at the 2020 SBS Drama Awards. The same year, Kim appeared as Jung Ui-myeong in the Netflix apocalyptic horror series Sweet Home.

In 2021, Kim made special appearances in Vincenzo and Racket Boys. In addition, Kim was cast as an MC in Channel A's DIMF Musical Star. Later in July, Kim was confirmed to star in the SBS drama Our Beloved Summer which premiered in December 2021. In August 2021, Kim was confirmed to join the historical film The Owl, where the filming began in September 2021.

Kim made his return to musicals as L in the 2022 Korean production of Death Note.

== Filmography ==
Key
†	Denotes films that have not yet been released

=== Film ===
Year	Title	Role	Notes	Ref.
2014	Winter Picnic	Seung-jae	Short film	
2017	The Silence of the Dogs	Hwang Guk-yeong	Short film	
2017	Anarchist from Colony	Koto Fumio		
2018	Too Hot to Die	Young Doo-seok		
2019	The Battle of Jangsari	Ki Ha-ryun		
2019	Kim Ji-young: Born 1982	Kim Ji-seok		
2020	Search Out	Joon-hyuk		
2022	The Night Owl	Crown Prince Sohyeon		
2024	Troll Factory	Jjingppeotking		
2025	The Old Woman with the Knife	Bullfight		
2025	Project Y	Boss To		

=== Television series ===
Year	Title	Role	Notes	Ref.
2017	Prison Playbook	Kim Young-cheol		
2018	To. Jenny	Park Jung-min		
2018	Player	Ji Sung-goo	Cameo (episode 1, 2)	
2019	The Wind Blows	Bryan Jung		
2019	Arthdal Chronicles	Ipsaeng		
2020	Hospital Playlist	No Jin-hyung	Cameo (episode 2)	
2020	Do You Like Brahms?	Han Hyun-ho		
2020	Drama Special	Lee Dong-shik	Episode: "One Night"	
2020	Sweet Home	Jung Ui-myeong	Cameo (season 1; episode 9, 10)	
2021	Vincenzo	Hwang Min-sung	Cameo (episode 8, 20)	
2021	Racket Boys	Park Jun-young	Cameo (episode 6)	
2021–2022	Our Beloved Summer	Kim Ji-woong		
2023–2024	Death's Game	Hyeon-su	Special appearance	
2024	No Way Out: The Roulette	Sung Joon-woo		
2024	Hellbound	Jung Jin-soo	Season 2	
2026	Boyfriend on Demand	Kim Se-jun	Cameo	
2026	Gold Land	Jang 'Woo-gi' Wook		

=== Television shows ===
Year	Title	Role	Ref.
2021	DIMF Musical Star	Host	

=== Music video appearances ===
Year	Song title	Artist	Ref.
2023	"Hangang Gongwon" (한강공원)	Bibi	

== Theater ==
=== Musicals ===
Musical play performances
Year	Title	Role	Ref.
2014	Puberty (사춘기)	Yong-man	
2015	My Bucket List (마이 버킷 리스트)	Hae-gi	
2015	Sontag Hotel (손탁호텔)	Jun	
2015	Pungwolju (풍월주)	Sa-dam	
2015–2016	Werther (베르테르)	Kainz	
2016	Au Revoir! UFO (안녕! 유에프오)	Sang-gu	
2016	Sweeney Todd (스위니 토드)	Tobias Ragg	
2016	Fan Letter (팬레터)	Jung Se-hun	
2017	Mr. Mouse (미스터 마우)	Seo In-hu	
2018	Vampire Arthur (뱀파이어 아더)	Arthur	
2019–2020	Big Fish (빅피쉬)	Will Bloom	
2022	Death Note (데스노트)	L	
2023	Death Note (데스노트)	L	
2023	Monte Cristo (몬테크리스토)	Edmond Dantes	

=== Plays ===
Theater play performances
Year	Title	Role	Venue	Date	Ref.
2016–2017	Romeo and Juliet (로미오와 줄리엣)	Benvolio	National Theater Daloreum Theater	December 9–January 13	
2017	Romeo and Juliet (로미오와 줄리엣)	Benvolio	Gunpo Culture and Arts Center Suri Hall (Grand Performance Hall)	January 21–22	
2017	Romeo and Juliet (로미오와 줄리엣)	Benvolio	Woosong Arts Center Daejeon	February 4–5	
2017	Romeo and Juliet (로미오와 줄리엣)	Benvolio	Suseong Artpia Paper Hall Daegu	February 23–24	
2017	Romeo and Juliet (로미오와 줄리엣)	Benvolio	Andong Culture and Arts Center Woongbu Hall	February 25–26	
2023	Shakespeare in Love (셰익스피어 인 러브 – 서울)	William Shakespeare	Seoul Arts Center CJ Towol Theater	January 28 to March 26	
2023	Shakespeare in Love (셰익스피어 인 러브 – 서울)	William Shakespeare	Sejong Arts Centre	April 8 to 9	

== Discography ==
=== Soundtrack appearances ===
Title	Year	Album	Ref.
"Nonhyun-dong Pork Belly"	2018	To. Jenny OST Part 1	
"Tiramisu Cake" (featuring Choi Yu-ri)	2018	To. Jenny OST Part 1	
"Grab Me" (featuring Lee Sang-yi)	2018	To. Jenny OST Part 1	
"Care About You"	2018	To. Jenny OST Part 1	
"Your Song" (featuring Jung Chae-yeon)	2018	To. Jenny OST Part 2	
"To. Jenny"	2018	To. Jenny OST Part 2	

=== Cast recordings ===
- Musical Pyungweolju (Original Soundtrack) (2015)
- My Bucket List (Original Cast Recording) (2016)
- Musical Mr. Mouse OST (2017)

== Accolades ==
=== Awards and nominations ===
Name of the award ceremony, year presented, category, nominee of the award, and the result of the nomination
Award	Year	Category	Nominee / Work	Result	Ref.
Baeksang Arts Awards	2023	Best Supporting Actor – Film	The Night Owl	Nominated	
Blue Dragon Film Awards	2019	Best New Actor	The Battle of Jangsari	Nominated	
Blue Dragon Film Awards	2025	Best Supporting Actor	The Old Woman with the Knife	Nominated	
Chunsa Film Art Awards	2020	Best New Actor	The Battle of Jangsari	Nominated	
Chunsa Film Art Awards	2023	Best New Actor	The Night Owl	Won	
Director's Cut Awards	2023	Best New Actor in film	The Night Owl	Nominated	
Grand Bell Awards	2023	Best New Actor	The Night Owl	Nominated	
KBS Drama Awards	2020	Best Actor in a One-Act/Special/Short Drama	Drama Special – One Night	Nominated	
Korean Culture and Entertainment Awards	2019	Best New Actor in a Film	The Battle of Jangsari	Won	
Korea Musical Awards	2017	Best New Actor	Sweeney Todd	Won	
Interpark Golden Ticket Awards	2023	Best Actor in a Play	Shakespeare in Love	Nominated	
SBS Drama Awards	2020	Best New Actor	Do You Like Brahms?	Nominated	
SBS Drama Awards	2021	Excellence Award for an Actor in a Mini-Series Romance/Comedy Drama	Our Beloved Summer	Nominated	
Stagetalk Audience Choice Awards	2015	Best Musical Actor - Male Rookie Award	Kim Sung-cheol	Won	
Daejeon Special FX Film Festival (DFX OTT Awards)	2026	Best Actor	Gold Land	Won	

=== Listicles ===
Name of publisher, year listed, name of listicle, and placement
Publisher	Year	Listicle	Placement	Ref.
Allure	2020	Rising Stars, New Faces on Stage	Shortlisted (Note: Shortlist with Jang Eun-ah, Lim Bye-ol, and Kim Seon-ho)	
