= To. Jenny =

2018 South Korean TV series

- Promotional poster
- Hangul: 투제니
- RR: TuJeni
- MR: T'uCheni
- Genre: Romance; Music
- Written by: Lee Jeong-hwa
- Directed by: Park Jin-woo
- Starring: Kim Sung-cheol; Jung Chae-yeon
- Country of origin: South Korea
- Original language: Korean
- No. of episodes: 2

Production
- Camera setup: Single-camera
- Running time: 60 minutes
- Production company: KBS Drama Production

Original release
- Network: KBS2
- Release: July 10 – July 18, 2018

To. Jenny (Korean: 투제니) is 2018 South Korean television series starring Kim Sung-cheol and Jung Chae-yeon. It aired on KBS2 from July 10–18, 2018.

== Synopsis ==
To. Jenny is a music drama about a young man who expresses his unrequited first love for a girl through music and a young woman who chases after her dream despite a harsh situation.

== Cast ==
=== Main ===
- Kim Sung-cheol as Park Jung-min, an aspiring singer-songwriter who has suffered from stage phobia ever since his voice cracked in front of his first love.
- Jung Chae-yeon as Kwon Na-ra, a member of an unsuccessful girl group on the brink of obscurity who is attempting to revive her career.

=== Supporting ===
- Choi Yoo-ri as Park Ok-hee, Jung-min's younger sister.
- Park Mi-sun as Kim Mi-ok, Jung-min's mother.
- Yang Ik-june as Kim Hyung-soo, Jung-min's uncle.
- Lee Sang-yi as Yeom Dae-sung, Jung-min's friend.
- Nam Tae-boo as Kim Min-bong, Jung-min's friend.
- Jo Kwan-woo as the CEO of Kwon Na-ra's agency
- NC.A as Eileen, a rival singer at Kwon Na-ra's agency
- Kim Junwook as a performer
- Jeong Sagang as a performer

== Soundtrack ==
The original soundtrack for the television series was released in two installments on July 11 and 18, 2018. It consists of diegetic music performed and written in-universe by series protagonist Park Jung-min. In reality, these songs (with the exception of original song "To. Jenny") are covers of existing songs by Korean indie artists performed by the show's cast.

=== Track listing ===
Part 1 – Released on July 11, 2018
No.	Title	Original artist	Length
1.	"Nonhyun-dong Pork Belly" (논현동 삼겹살; performed by Kim Sung-cheol)	A.Coma	3:24
2.	"Tiramisu Cake" (performed by Kim Sung-cheol and Choi Yu-ri)	We Are The Night	3:11
3.	"Grab Me" (performed by Kim Sung-cheol and Lee Sang-yi)	Choi Nakta	3:13
4.	"Care About You" (조심스러운 이유; performed by Kim Sung-cheol)	MeloMance	3:29
Total length:			13:23

Part 2 – Released on July 18, 2018
No.	Title	Original artist	Length
1.	"Your Song" (performed by Kim Sung-cheol and Jung Chae-yeon)	Sam Kim	4:08
2.	"To. Jenny" (performed by Kim Sung-cheol)	N/A	3:18
Total length:			7:26

== Ratings ==
Ep.	Broadcast date	Average audience share (Nationwide)
Ep.	Broadcast date	AGB Nielsen
1	July 10, 2018	1.8%
2	July 17, 2018	1.6%
Average		1.7%
