= New Life Begins =

2022 Chinese historical series

- Official poster
- Also known as: QingQing Daily; QingChuan Daily; Blind Date in XinChuan
- Genre: Historical; Romantic; Comedy
- Based on: Time Travel to the Daily Life of the Qing Dynasty by DuoMuMuDuo
- Written by: Liu Lianzi; Wang Xiaoping
- Directed by: Zhao Qichen
- Starring: Bai Jingting; Tian Xiwei
- Country of origin: China
- Original language: Mandarin
- No. of episodes: 40

Production
- Production location: China
- Running time: 45 minutes
- Production companies: IQIYI; New Classics Media

Original release
- Network: IQIYI
- Release: 10 November – 9 December 2022

Related
- The Romance of Tiger and Rose (2020)

New Life Begins (Chinese: 卿卿日常) is a 2022 Chinese romantic comedy series starring Bai Jingting and Tian Xiwei. It is an adaptation of the web novel Time Travel to the Daily Life of the Qing Dynasty by DuoMuMuDuo, directed by Zhao Qichen and produced by Liu Wenyang. The story is about Yin Zheng and Li Wei, who meet unexpectedly, and embark on a lively life filled with dynamic situations. On 10 November 2022, it premiered on IQIYI. It set a record by achieving the fastest 10,000 'Popularity Heat Index' on iQIYI.

On 17 April 2023, the series was aired on the Hong Kong TVB Jade channel under the title "Blind Date in XinChuan".

== Plot ==
Due to a political marriage, girls from all over Ji Chuan gathered in Xinchuan. Yin Zheng, the Sixth Young Lord of Xinchuan, who lives a low-key life, and Li Wei, who hopes to fail in this political marriage and return to her hometown, unexpectedly meet. Together, they begin a new life full of varied and enjoyable experiences. As Yin Zheng enters the government, they gradually find they share similar tastes and feelings. They experience daily life together, sharing meals and seasons, and grow alongside other siblings with distinct personalities and destinies, creating a warm and vibrant story of life within the large Xinchuan family.

== Geopolitical theme ==
The TV series is set in nine regions and countries. The continent is divided into nine regions (九川), each called a "Chuan" (川). Each Chuan has its own culture and system, and they intermarry to maintain peace and development. Among them, "XinChuan" is the most powerful region. Consequently, each region must participate in the marriage election convention held by XinChuan to gain its protection.

Name of Chuan	Introduction
Xin Chuan	Situated at the center, the first of the nine Chuans upholds Confucian traditions, values the rule of law, and follows the belief in male superiority over female inferiority.
Jin Chuan	Located in the east, close to the sea, Jin Chuan thrives on commerce, fishing, and salt industries. The people of Jin Chuan have a particular fondness for seafood.
Dan Chuan	Situated in the west, Dan Chuan has a matriarchal society where women are superior to men. The people of Dan Chuan enjoy spicy food, such as hot pot, and are fond of playing card games.
Dai Chuan	Located in the northeast, Dai Chuan is mountainous and rich in mineral resources. The people of Dai Chuan are known for their unique foods, including luosifen and stinky tofu.
Yan Chuan	Situated in the south, Yan Chuan enjoys a warm and humid climate, rich in flowers and fruits. Women from Yan Chuan are renowned for their beauty.
Mo Chuan	Located in the north, Mo Chuan has vast grasslands and is known for its nomadic lifestyle, developed animal husbandry, and powerful cavalry. The people of Mo Chuan enjoy spirits and barbecued meat.
Cang Chuan	In the northwest, Cang Chuan has a dry climate with numerous deserts and barren lands. Resources are scarce, and most people live near oases with clean water.
Yin Chuan	Located in the southeast, Yin Chuan enjoys a temperate climate with abundant rainfall and a landscape that resembles spring year-round. Its rivers, lakes, and fertile land make it highly productive.
Ji Chuan	Situated in the southwest, Ji Chuan is known for its gender equality, monogamy, and liberal culture. The people of Ji Chuan have a love for mushrooms.

== Cast ==
=== Main ===
Artist	Role	Note	Cantonese Dubbing (TVB)
Bai Jingting	Yin Zheng	Sixth Prince of Xinchuan, a low-profile and studious noble, known for his many talents and ability to govern. He eventually marries Li Wei.	Carlos Lee
Tian Xiwei	Li Wei	She was born into a humble yet harmonious family, a cheerful girl with a love for food. She accidentally marries Yin Zheng.	Heidy Ling Hei
Chang Long	Yin Qi	Fifth Prince, husband of Shang Guan Jing, known for his kindness and as the biological brother of Princess Linlang.	
Fan Shuai Qi	Shang Guan Jing	A princess of Danchuan and younger sister of the Madam of Danchuan, she becomes the main wife of Yin Qi.	

=== Jiu Chuan (Nine Regions) ===
Xin Chuan

Artist	Role	Note	Cantonese Dubbing (TVB)
Gao Shuguang	Lord of Xinchuan	The ruler of Xinchuan and Jiu Chuan.	Zhao Shiliang
Zhang Ruika	Madam Xinchuan	Wife of the Lord of Xinchuan and the mother of Yin Song.	Yuan Shuzheng

- Karina Zhao as Madam He: Mother of Yin Zheng and the Eleventh Prince, she became the Lord of Xinchuan’s concubine at a young age
- Edward Zhang as Yin Song: Second prince, born to Madam Xinchuan. He is brother of the Tenth Prince and Princess Shuyu. Husband of Lady Fangru and ex-husband of Hao Jia
- Chen Zi Han as Zhao Fangru: Yin Song’s main wife, from Danchuan. Her family owns most of the mines in Daichuan
- Liu Meng Meng as Dong Haitong: Yin An's main wife, from Cangchuan
- Liu Mei Han as Song Wu: Princess Kening, adopted daughter of Madam He, marries Song Wu
- Yin Kun: First son, born to a concubine. He was stationed in the Mo Chuan region and is the father of Ping'an.
- Jiang Yue: Yin Kun's main wife and the mother of Ping'an
- Yin An: Third Prince, husband to Lady Dong. His biological mother died young, so he was raised by Madam Xinchuan
- Yin Han: Ninth Prince, friends with Li Wei
- Yin Yue: Tenth Prince, born to Madam Xinchuan, brother of Yin Song and Princess Shuyu
- Yin Zai: Eleventh Prince, born to Madam He and younger brother of Yin Zheng

Jinchuan

- Liu Ling Zi as Yuan Ying: Princess of Jinchuan and Yin Zheng's main wife

Danchuan

- Madam of Danchuan: Older sister of Shang Guan Jing and ruler of the Danchuan region. Sister-in-law of Yin Qi
- Shang Guan Jing:Younger sister of the Madam of Danchuan

Daichuan

- Chen Zi Han as Zhao Fangru: Yin Song's main wife. Later, he divorces him and moves back to Daichuan

Jichuan

- Hu Ke as Zhu Ge Xiao Mei: Mother of Li Wei and Li Cang. Wife of Li Wen Bi
- Yu En Tai as Li Wen Bi: Father of Li Wei and Li Cang; lower official in Jichuan
- Xu Wai Luo as Li Cang: Younger brother of Li Wei. The son of Zhu Ge Xiao Mei and Li Wen Bi

== Soundtrack ==
Title	Artist	Lyrics/Composer	Length
Brilliance; Theme Song	Liu Yuning	Zheng Zhuoqun; Yao Beina; Yang Yuxiao	4:32
To Taste; Ending Song	Bu Cai	Zheng Zhuoqun; Yao Beina; Yang Yuxiao	3:36
Over the Years	Xilinnayi Gao	Zheng Zhuoqun; Yao Beina; Yang Yuxiao	3:12
Sound	Lai Meiyun	Zheng Zhuoqun; Yao Beina; Yang Yuxiao	4:21
South Wind	Ye Xuanqing	Zheng Zhuoqun; Yao Beina; Yang Yuxiao	4:26
Never	Zhang Xianzi	Zheng Zhuoqun; Yao Beina; Yang Yuxiao	4:08

- HongKong version:

Title	Artist
Bubble Cucumber (Theme Song)	Yao Zhaofei, Zhang Chihao
Get the Courage to Be Happy (Ending Theme Song)	Windy Zhan

== Reception ==
In 2022, the series was national and internationally successful, becoming fastest drama on IQIYI to reach the 10,000 'Popularity Heat Index' mark; its first week peaked at 19.6 rating with 1.26M viewership. Critics appreciated casts acting in bringing their respective role to life, and the characterization which is not complex. The women empowerment and friendship theme was effectively conveyed. It ranked among the 'Top 5 Dramas' in viewership and featured in 'iQIYI Top 10', maintaining its lasting popularity.

== Ratings ==
Premiere ratings on TVB Jade in Hong Kong, China.

- The Blue number represents the highest ratings.

Dates	Episodes	Audience share	Average live TV ratings
17-21 April 2023	01－05	19.6	16.4
24-28 April 2023	06－10	19.8	17
01-5 May 2023	11－15	19.6	17.2
08-12 May 2023	16－20	19.1	17.8
15-19 May 2023	21－25	19.7	16.8
22-26 May 2023	26－30	19.6	17
All Episodes		19.8	17.3

== Awards and nominations ==
Year	Award	Category	Work	Result	Ref.
2022	IQIYI TV and Movie Jury Award	Best Newcomer in a TV Series	Tian Xiwei	Won	
2022	IQIYI TV and Movie Jury Award	Annual Influential Actor	Bai Jingting	Won	
2022	IQIYI TV and Movie Jury Award	Special Honor		Won	
2023	3rd Global Film and Television Culture Communication Summit Forum and Annual Selection	Excellent Series in International Communication		Won	
2023	Weibo Awards Ceremony	Progressive Actor of the Year	Tian Xiwei	Won	
2023	Golden Screenwriters' Night	Best Adapted Screenplay	Sangrou JiLu, Ding Zhuoqun & Zheng	Won	
2024	Star Awards Ceremony	Best Song Written By Television	Bubble Cucumber (Hongkong Version by Yao Zhaofei & Zhang Chihao)	Nominated	
2024	Star Awards Ceremony	Best Song Written By Television	Get The Courage To Be Happy (Hongkong Version by Windy Zhan)	Nominated	
2024	Golden Bud Network Film and Television Festival	Quality Director of the Year	Qichen Zhao	Won	
2024	Golden Bud Network Film and Television Festival	Excellent Drama of the Year		Won	
