= Pursuit of Jade =

2026 Chinese television series

- Promotional poster
- Also known as: Zhu Yu; Chasing Jade
- Genre: Historical; Romance
- Based on: Zhu Yu by Tuan Zi Lai Xi
- Written by: Zou Yue; Jin Zi; Zeng Zhen
- Directed by: Zeng Qingjie
- Starring: Zhang Linghe; Tian Xiwei
- Country of origin: China
- Original language: Mandarin
- No. of seasons: 1
- No. of episodes: 40

Production
- Executive producers: Wang Xiao Hui; Wang Ke
- Producers: Peng Tian (chief producer); Ye Zhou (chief producer); Lv Yan Ting; Fu Tuo; Ren Chang Qing; Wang Ying Yu
- Production location: Hengdian World Studios
- Editor: Wang Yuanyuan
- Running time: 45–55 minutes
- Production companies: Tencent Video; iQIYI; Haohan Entertainment; The Alliance of Gods; Chun Feng Hua Mian

Original release
- Network: Tencent Video; iQIYI; Netflix
- Release: 6 March – 26 March 2026

Pursuit of Jade (Chinese: 逐玉) is a 2026 Chinese television series directed by Zeng Qingjie. It stars Zhang Linghe and Tian Xiwei. It is based on the web novel Zhu Yu by Tuan Zi Lai Xi. On 6 March 2026, it was released worldwide on Tencent Video, iQIYI, and Netflix.

The series was a massive international success. Within one week of its broadcast, Pursuit of Jade recorded heat indexes exceeding 31,000 points on Tencent and 10,000 points on iQIYI. Upon its release, the series debuted at number six on Netflix's Global Top 10 Non-English Shows chart, and reached the top 5 of Netflix's Global Top 10 Non-English shows chart from March to early Spring.

== Synopsis ==
During a snowstorm, recently orphaned Fan Changyu encounters Xie Zheng, a fallen nobleman who is heavily injured. Changyu works as a butcher to support her family and help Zheng recover. Xie Zheng hides his true identity as decorated general Marquis Wu'an as he plots revenge for a sixteen-year blood feud. With their own goals in mind, the two enter into a marriage of convenience that grows into genuine love.

== Cast and characters ==
=== Main ===
- Zhang Linghe as Xie Zheng / Yan Zheng
  - Zhou Yige as teen Xie Zheng
  - Ruan Yunji as young Xie Zheng

On the surface, Xie Zheng is the frail live-in husband of Fan Changyu. However, he is hiding his identity as the Marquis of Wu'an, burdened with the blood feud of his family's massacre. He uses his gentle appearance to mislead the villagers while secretly investigating the truth of his family's tragedy and revenge.

- Tian Xiwei as Fan Changyu
  - Zhao Yiqiao as young Fan Changyu

A feisty and resilient butcher, Changyu enters into a matrilocal marriage with the injured Xie Zheng to save her family's house. When war begins, she enters the battlefield and becomes an acclaimed and decorated general.

=== Supporting ===
- Kong Xueer as Yu Qianqian

The owner and manager of Yixiang Restaurant. She has a son named Yu Bao'er.

- Deng Kai as Qi Min / Sui Yuanhuai
  - Xie Zimo as young Qi Min

The first-born son of rebel Prince Changxin, he harbors a deep secret and a desire for power. He is very possessive of Yu Qianqian.

- Wu Jia Jun as Yu Bao'er

The son of Yu Qianqian, whose lineage his mother keeps hidden.

- Ren Hao as Li Huaian

Also known as Lord Li, Li Huaian is the eldest grandson of Grand Tutor Li. He serves in the military on his grandfather's orders. He develops feelings for Fan Changyu.

- Li Qing as Gongsun Yin

The strategist of the Yanzhou army, he is Xie Zheng's righthand man and closest friend. He is in love with the Grand Princess Qi Shu.

- Yu Zhongli as Qi Shu

The Grand Princess of the realm, she is the sister to the current emperor. She longs for a life outside the palace walls and works as a medic for the Yanzhou army. She is in love with the army's strategist, Gongsun Yin.

- Yan Yikuan as Wei Yan

The Prime Minister of the realm, he is also the maternal uncle of Xie Zheng. He leads the Wei clan, the first of two primary factions in the imperial court.

- Wang Jiu Sheng as Li Jing

The Grand Tutor of the realm, he is also the grandfather of Li Huaian. He leads the Li clan, the second of two primary factions in the imperial court.

- Lu Yong as He Jingyuan

Also known as General He, he led the Jizhou armies against the rebels. He was a close friend of Fan Changyu's father.

- Guan Yunpeng as Qi Sheng

The reigning emperor, often regarded as a puppet ruler hung between the Li and Wei clan factions.

- Lin Muran as Sui Yuanqing

The second-born son of rebel Prince Changxin, he is the crown prince of the rebel faction.

- Lin Siyi as Shisan Niang

The bloodthirsty leader of the Qingfeng bandits, she is a fierce warrior and in a relationship with Sui Yuanqing.

Fan Family

- Cao Yanning as Fan Changning, Fan Changyu's younger sister
- Bai Liwei as Fan Erniu, Fan Changyu's father
- Yuan Ran as Meng Lihua, Fan Changyu's mother
- Gao Yuqing as Fan Daniu, Fan Changyu's uncle
- Li Yusu as Madame Fan, Fan Changyu's aunt

Blood-Robed Cavalry

The Blood-Robed Cavalry are elite retainers who serve the Marquis Wu'an. Distinguished by their crimson uniforms, they act as his most trusted subordinates, carrying out military operations, intelligence gathering, security, and special missions. Four are prominently featured:

- Shawn Zhang as Xie Wu, commander responsible for field deployment and command operations
- Liu Yu Wei as Xie Qi, commander responsible for protection missions
- Guan Wen as Xie Jiu, subordinate member of the guard
- Yang He Wen as Xie Shi Yi, subordinate responsible for military operations

Lin'an Villagers

- Liu Lin as Mrs. Zhao, Fan Changyu's and Fan Changning's neighbor and adoptive aunt
- Yue Yang as Mr. Zhao, Fan Changyu's and Fan Changning's neighbor and adoptive uncle
- Li Dianzun as Jin Yuanbao, petty criminal turned decorated warrior
- Wu Yijia as Man Wu, Jin Yuanbao's comrade turned decorated warrior
- Sun Kai as Man Cang, Jin Yuanbao's comrade turned decorated warrior
- Gao Qingchen as Man Di, Jin Yuanbao's comrade turned decorated warrior
- He Changxi (body), Zhu Zanjin (face) as Song Yan, Fan Changyu's former fiancé
- Fu Miao as Madame Song, Song Yan's mother
- Feng Jun as Granny Jin, Jin Yuanbao's grandmother
- Zhao Xiru as Fu Ling, Yu Qianqian's maidservant
- Xiao Lu as Lady Chen, owner of a tailor shop
- Wei Chenfei as Madame Yin, owner of a noodle shop
- Zhu Zhongjin as Li Deqin, chef at Yixiang Restaurant
- Ning Xiaohua as Guo Dali, rival butcher
- Xie Zecheng as a young shopowner for braised meat
- Pang Jing as Shopkeeper Luo, pawnshop owner

Government Office

- Du Chun as Wang Chuanxian, constable head
- Xiang Xia as Magistrate Cui of Qingping County
- Shang Qi as Cui Qianjin, daughter of Magistrate Cui

== Episodes ==
No.	Title	Directed by	Original release date
1	"Episode 1"	Qingjie Zeng	March 6, 2026
Fan Changyu lives in Lin'an with her sick younger sister Changning. After her parents were murdered by bandits, Changyu works to support herself and Changning by butchering pigs in Lin'an. She had been engaged to local scholar Song Yan, but his mother ended their engagement because of her reputation for being a jinx. Mrs. Song demands the return of the betrothal letter, but Changyu refuses until the Song family repays all the money Changyu's late parents had lent the Song family. While walking home after a butchering job outside of town, Changyu discovers a wounded young man, lying half-dead in the snow. Changyu assumes he was attacked by bandits, so she carried him home. Her neighbours (and adoptive aunt and uncle), Mr. and Mrs. Zhao help Changyu care for his wounds, letting him stay in the Zhao's home, just beside Changyu's house. When he wakes, the young man tells Changyu his name is Yan Zheng, a refugee from Chongzhou, and that he has no family left. As refugees are frowned upon, Changyu and the Zhaos keep his presence a secret. In flashbacks, an armoured Zheng fights with other warriors, and appears to be the sole survivor of a violent skirmish. It is revealed that Yan Zheng's real name is Xie Zheng, the famed Marquis of Wu'an. A white falcon arrives at his window, bearing a message that asks if he is alive. He scrawls the name of the town with a burnt chopstick and sends the reply away with the falcon. Mr. Zhao warns Changyu that Yan Zheng's medicine will be expensive, and she is already paying a lot for the medicine her sister needs. Changyu pawns the rare silver hairpin that belonged to her mother to pay for Yan Zheng's medicine, promising to return to buy the hairpin back in a few days. Soldiers arrive to search houses for refugees without travel passes: anyone caught will be forced to join the army. Changyu comes under suspicion when they find a bloodied cloth by the sickbed, but she declares it as used for her butchering business. Yan Zheng remains safely hidden in her pig sty.
2	"Episode 2"	Qingjie Zeng	March 6, 2026
In order to earn extra money, Changyu reopens her late parents' butcher shop. Her first day is a success, but Mr. Zhao arrives in a breathless haste. He tells Changyu that her uncle has arrived at her house with Jin Yuanbao and his brothers, petty criminals and debt collectors, to pay off his gambling debts with the title deed of the house. Mrs. Zhao goes to the Songs to ask Song Yan to help Changyu, but Madam Song stops her son from helping. Changyu storms back home in a fury and fights off the gangsters herself (with a little discreet help from Yan Zheng). The gang leave only after Constable Wang arrives to enforce order. An old friend of the family, he informs Changyu that, because her father has passed away, the title deed will go to the next male heir (in this case, her uncle). When Changyu goes to pay respects to her parents' memorial tablets, Yan Zheng comes down, and they talk. Mr. and Mrs. Zhao come up with a solution for Changyu to keep the house by taking in a matrilocal husband. Yan Zheng, being the nearest available male of marriageable age (staying right in their house!) and indebted to Changyu, would be ideal. Changyu attempts to talk to Yan Zheng about, but hesitates. Instead, she practices the conversation with one of her pigs. Unbeknownst to her, Yan Zheng overhears the whole scene, watching from above. When Changyu brings warm soup to Yan Zheng, he agrees to be her matrilocal husband. Overjoyed, she offers to provide for him if he stays.
3	"Episode 3"	Qingjie Zeng	March 6, 2026
Changyu goes about the next few days in a much more cheerful mood, very happy that Zheng agreed to marry her. She promises to hire the best doctors for him once they are married, planning to feed him by butchering pigs if he stays. Yan Zheng assures her that once he recovers, he will leave and that he will repay her for saving his life. When he asks her what she wants, she wishes to expand her pig butchering business so that she can take 20-30 pigs. Upon being told to think bigger, she wishes for 100-200 pigs. Changyu goes to the fabric shop to have wedding clothes made. Outside, townspeople argue over whether the famed Marquis Wu'an was alive and whether he was a good person. Back at the capital, in the palace, the emperor decides to reward Marquis of Wu’an's army with gold due to their leader's heroic status. Prime Minister Wei Yan, the Marquis' uncle, tells them not to announce the Marquis' death in order to keep enemies in the dark. In the woods, Changyu sprains her leg after being attacked by a wolf. Two gentlemen on the road offer to give her a ride home in their carriage: Li Huai’an and his loyal subordinate. Li Huai’an is a student of the great General He and is searching for the Marquis. They nearly meet Yan Zheng at Changyu's house when they drop her off. Li Huai’an believes the mysterious Yan Zheng may be the Marquis, but his subordinate is incredulous: why would the Marquis marry a butcher and become a live-in husband? After the two leave, Changyu goes to take measurements for Yan Zheng's wedding outfit. Zheng notices her sprained leg and resets it. Changyu asks Zheng to accompany her to pray for the Marquis in secret. Initially surprised, Xie Zheng tags along. Not knowing Yan Zheng is actually the Marquis, Changyu shares about the Marquis' supposedly bloodthirsty reputation, but she is actually impressed by his military achievements. Later, Yan Zheng notices in shock that his falcon has been caught by a trap set by Changyu. He frees it. Jin Yuanbao and his gang return to search for the title deed.
4	"Episode 4"	Qingjie Zeng	March 6, 2026
Mr. Zhao rallies the neighbours (with some discreet help from Yan Zheng again) to stop Jin Yuanbao and his gang from ransacking the house. Afterwards, Changyu helps clean Yan Zheng's wounds, realizing that his wounds reopened due to his involvement in the fight with the gangsters. Suspicious, she questions his martial arts skills, and he tells her that he used to be an armed escort. While brainstorming ways to help fight the case against Changyu's uncle, Yan Zheng offers to help, revealing his knowledge of court processes and literary background. He teaches her a simple poem to use in her case, which further intrigues Changyu. Song Yan arrives at night, offering Changyu a solution to keep the house by taking her as his concubine. Insulted, she rejects him, and when he tries to approach Changyu, Yan Zheng hurls him out of the house. Yan Zheng and Changyu put up an act to show Song Yan that they are husband and wife. In the morning, Mr. Zhao helps Yan Zheng collect silver taels from the bookshop, where Yan Zheng had sold his essays. Yan Zheng then buys back the hairpin Changyu pawned. Changyu returns to see her wedding outfit ready, which includes embroidered flowers for her wedding night. On the day of her wedding, the townspeople speculate that Changyu's husband must be either be ugly or crippled to have agreed to be a matrilocal husband. However, they were shocked at his stunningly handsome appearance. Song Yan arrives to give Changyu one last chance to accept his offer but is vehemently rejected. Yan Zheng thanks Song Yan for not recognizing a "true gem". During the rituals, Changyu states that Yan Zheng does not need to change his surname, and their children do not need to take hers since they can have many children and use both. When the last ritual states how Changyu has to be obeyed as the head of the household, Yan Zheng agrees and bows to Changyu. She whisper to him that in the future, they will discuss and make decisions together.
5	"Episode 5"	Qingjie Zeng	March 6, 2026
Changyu's uncle and aunt sneak behind the house due to their suspicions about the validity of the marriage. Using a candle to cast shadows, Yan Zheng and Changyu mislead the pair. In town the next day, Changyu reopens her parents' butcher shop to earn more money. She collect the travel documents for Yan Zheng and stops by the pawnbroker's shop. She is heartbroken to learn that her hairpin has already been sold to someone else. On her way home, Madam Song gives her some money and asks her to return the betrothal letter, as their family is moving out. Changning calls Yan Zheng over as Granny Kang and the rest of the townspeople harass Changyu. He reads out a long list of items the Song family had bought and spent at the expense of the Fan family. The Song family does not have enough money to pay it back, but Magistrate Cui's daughter, who is betrothed to Song Yan, insultingly pays the money by pouring it on the ground for the Fan family to pick up. Changyu reveals that the letter had been under a rock outside the Song family's door. Changyu explains to Yan Zheng that she was upset over losing the hairpin, only for him to pull it from his sleeve and hand it to her. Changyu chides Yan Zheng for selling his essays, as she can butcher pigs to provide for their family. Yan Zheng's falcon arrives at the Luyuan Academy, delivering Yan Zheng's message to headmaster Gongsun Yin.
6	"Episode 6"	Qingjie Zeng	March 6, 2026
Yan Zheng watches Changyu butcher a pig, afterwards helping her to cure meat. He takes note of her specially forged knives, and questions her skills in martial arts. His falcon, caught a second time in Changyu's trap, is adopted by her after Yan Zheng promises to train it (mostly to avoid Changyu killing it). Meanwhile, Changyu prays to her parents to protect Yan Zheng. The stove at Changyu's shop is smashed, as she did not pay protection money, only to realize that it was Jin Yuanbao and his gang. After confronting them, they fix the stove and help run the shop. Jin's grandmother angrily arrives, believing that he was collecting protection money. After Changyu defuses the situation, Jin tells Changyu that his brothers had their own family issues, needing money being unable to find jobs due to the war. Changyu cooks a meal for them and offers them employment. Yan Zheng goes to the shops to buy groceries and supplies for the Fan family, including clam ointment and wrist guards for Changyu. He tells the shopkeeper to deliver them as part of a pre-arranged purchase under the identity of Changyu's father. Meanwhile, Changyu is defamed by another store owner and angrily confronts him. After defeating him, the shop owner attempts to attack her but falls from a stone Yan Zheng throws skilfully to intercept him. At home, the shopkeeper delivered the groceries. Changyu wants to return the clam moisturizer, but Yan Zheng uses it so she can't return it. The next day, the court hearing is presided over by Magistrate Cui. After hours without Changyu's uncle showing up, his body is brought in by the local constables instead to the shock of all the bystanders.
7	"Episode 7"	Qingjie Zeng	March 7, 2026
Changyu's aunt accuses her of killing her uncle, and Changyu is placed under arrest. Constable Wang and his fellow constables go over to the Fan house to find the dead bodies of several black-robed men, speculating that someone had come to the Fan house to take revenge. Yan Zheng takes Changning and flees into the snowy woods. Changyu begs Constable Wang to free her so she can look for her sister. After hiding Changning, Yan Zheng and his falcon fight with the attackers. After Changyu arrives, Yan Zheng holds off the attackers to allow Changyu to escape, with Changyu coming back later to save him. Upon their return, they collapse in the snow, to be later found by Changning and Constable Wang. While asleep, Yan Zheng dreams of his mother and her suicide. Yan Zheng notices that their attackers carried a whistle resembling the ones carried by the Prime Minister's Iron Suicide Warriors, but he realizes they weren't after him, but Changyu. Changyu offers to teach Yan Zheng how to butcher pigs so he has an additional skill other than being an armed escort. While they're talking, Constable Wang arrives. He grimly states he is forced to arrest Yan Zheng for suspected murder of Changyu's uncle. During the trial, Magistrate Cui pounces on Yan Zheng's lost travel permit as a sign of guilt, believing him to be a bandit from the Qingfeng stronghold. Yan Zheng requests they wait a few days for his original travel permit to arrive, which the Magistrate interprets as insolence and orders his constables to beat Yan Zheng. Just as Yan Zheng was about to fight the magistrate's constables, Gongsun arrives with Yan Zheng's travel permit, claiming him as a Luyuan Academy student. As Luyuan Academy is the most prestigious educational institution in the empire (with nobility among its students), he uses his status as its headmaster to have the magistrate acquit Yan Zheng. Changyu is also released due to insufficient evidence. As the court is dismissed, Yan Zheng coughs up blood and tells Gongsun to take care of Fan Changyu. He then collapses.
8	"Episode 8"	Qingjie Zeng	March 7, 2026
While Zheng recovers, Gongsun is invited to tea by the Zhaos. He is shocked to learn that Yan Zheng has become a matrilocal husband. He initially imagines Changyu as a large and fierce lady, but is surprised to see her in person. Changyu asks if Gongsun is Yan Zheng's master or close friend, and reveals that she begged Yan Zheng for the marriage. After Zheng wakes up, Gongsun and Zheng question why Prime Minister Wei would want to kill the Fan household. Constable Wang advises Changyu to lay low and hide, and she wonders if Yan Zheng will follow her. She rushes home to see a letter and some money. Tearfully believing Yan Zheng had left, she was much relieved to see Yan Zheng return and that it was only Gongsun who left. Changyu asks if Yan Zheng would like to join her or stay with Mr. and Mrs. Zhao. He chooses the former. Yan Zheng asks if Changyu's parents left her any inheritance that she needed to take when on the run, to which Changyu says only the title deed, the knives, and her sister. Changyu visits her grandfather, who tries to tell Changyu something important but is cut off. Mr. Li from the famous Yixang Restaurant comes to find Changyu and recommend her to his manager. The owner of Yixiang restaurant, Yu Qianqian, strikes a deal with Changyu, offering money and a deposit for Changyu to supply pork and cook braised meat for the restaurant. Changyu's competitor, Butcher Guo, comes to the restaurant to slander both Qianqian and Changyu, so Qianqian has him beaten up by her staff in the back room. Lord Li notes that the person the assassins had been looking for was Fan Changyu, not Yan Zheng. Mrs Zhao encourages Changyu to consummate her marriage.
9	"Episode 9"	Qingjie Zeng	March 8, 2026
Yan Zheng and Changyu share a bed in order to fool Mr. and Mrs. Zhao. As they talk, Changyu says people close to them will still try to comfort them even after hurting them, but if the person genuinely wants to hurt them, then they are no longer close. They kiss, but realize a group of Iron Suicide warriors are outside their house. The couple fight them off. Changyu runs into the streets to divert them, and Lord Li Huai'an appears with his soldiers to seize the assailants. In the house, one of the warriors recognizes Yan Zheng as Marquis Wu’an and reveals that Prime Minister Wei ordered them to kill the Fan sisters and retrieve a letter. The warrior then kills himself. Lord Li explains that he was here to capture bandits from Qingfeng Stronghold. Upon discovering Changyu's memorial tablet to the Marquis, Lord Li corrects the sycophantic Magistrate Cui by saying despite his supposedly bloodthirsty reputation, the Marquis Wu'an is a national hero. Changyu runs home to save Yan Zheng as he passes out from blood loss. Lord Li suspects him to be Marquis Wu'an. In Lord Li's room, his associates debate on whether or not Yan Zheng could be the Marquis. Huai'an draws a picture and ask his men to send it to the Marquis' subordinates in Yanzhou to verify. Prime Minister Wei's son Wei Xuan asks General He to help tame Marquis Wu'an's soldiers at Yanzhou. Lord Li returns to report to General He that the Iron Suicide Warriors had attacked the Fan household twice. Lord Li asks his master what if Marquis Wu'an was alive, to which General He replies that the Marquis' survival would be a blessing for the Great Yin empire, as Prince Changxin of Chongzhou is expected to launch his rebellion soon.
10	"Episode 10"	Qingjie Zeng	March 9, 2026
Changyu and Changning go to pray for their parents. General He asks Lord Li to look after the Fan sisters if he dies one day. Granny Kang arrives to accuse Changing of injuring her grandson in self-defence. Before she leaves, Yan Zheng throws a candy to make her trip in front of the villagers. Changyu wants to divorce Yan Zheng as she believes her family is a burden to him. Yan Zheng refuses, telling her not to listen to the opinions of others. General He sends Prime Minister Wei a box of mysterious old letters from sixteen years earlier, asking him to spare the Fan sisters. Prime Minister Wei decides to let the daughters live and burns the letters. Lord Li returns to Lin'an to tell Changyu that bandits were after her because of a rumour that her father may have possessed a treasure map, but that they have found the treasure map elsewhere, and so she and her sister are safe. Lord Li also gives Changyu thirty taels from the government coffers, presumably on instructions from General He. Yan Zheng wonders why Lord Li would make up a lie to cover the case. Changyu tells her sister that they do not have to move. Yan Zheng writes a note and sends the falcon to deliver it. The falcon's disappearance saddens Changning, but Yan Zheng promises that it will return. Changyu opens her braised meat shop at Yixiang Restaurant. Lord Li moves into the Song house, directly opposite from the Fan house. Yan Zheng asks Lord Li why he is in Lin'an, to which he replies that he recognises Yan Zheng as the Marquis Wu'an. He declares his intention to be truly loyal to the empire.
11	"Episode 11"	Qingjie Zeng	March 9, 2026
The tense encounter between Yan Zheng and Lord Li ends when Changning arrives to ask Yan Zheng to go home to eat. Yan Zheng meets two of his personal guards Xie Wu and Xie Qi in the woods. He tells them to start storing grain and spread news of his death. Xie Wu notices that Yan Zheng is carrying something under his sleeve that appears as if it belongs to a woman. Changyu and Qianqian are on their way home when they are suddenly attacked by unknown assailants, including Butcher Guo. He drugs Changyu, but Yan Zheng is nearby and defeats Guo, tying him up and bringing him back to the Fan residence. There, he beats him into revealing his plans to drug and sell Qianqian and Changyu. As Yan Zheng is about to kill Guo, Changyu wakes up to stop him. Back at Luyuan Academy, Gongsun's student proposes a game of Go against him. The student is secretly the Grand Princess in disguise. The two discuss their experiences playing Go against an unknown opponent each day, unaware that they were actually playing against each other. Empress Dowager sends for her daughter to come home. Disheartened, the Princess lets Gongsun know that she had been secretly playing Go with him. Meanwhile, the Empress Dowager wishes for the Princess to marry Lord Li. Qianqian meets a rice merchant who calls himself Mr. Qi in her restaurant. He appears to be immediately infatuated with her.
12	"Episode 12"	Qingjie Zeng	March 10, 2026
Madam Song brings her friends to Yixiang Restaurant to gossip about Changyu and Qianqian. Afterwards, Mr. Qi sends his men to forcefully warn Madam Song for defiling Qianqian's name. Qianqian tells Changyu to design an emblem for her braised meat, and Changyu asks Yan Zheng to help. Business at the braised meat store increases tremendously, with women buying because of Yan Zheng's striking good looks and men buying because of his excellent calligraphy skill in designing the emblem.. Back at the restaurant, Qianqian is harassed by a drunken customer, and upon being rebuked, he tries to stab her with a knife, only to be stopped by Mr. Qi. Changning meets Bao'er, Qianqian's young son, and they play hide-and-seek together. The children become lost, and the adults launch a frantic attempt to find them. Yan Zheng finds them sleeping in a chest. General He and Yan Zheng hear from their own respective scouts that someone bought 200,000 units of grain at a high price while their army was having commoners pay their taxes in grain. It is revealed that Mr. Qi, whose real name is Qi Min, is the one who bought the grains. Qi Min tries to book out the entire restaurant, but Qianqian closes it to avoid him. She asks Changyu to let her borrow Yan Zheng to pretend to be her husband so that she can chase Mr. Qi away.
13	"Episode 13"	Qingjie Zeng	March 10, 2026
In exchange for 30 taels, Changyu allows Qianqian to borrow Yan Zheng as a husband for one day. Yan Zheng meets Qi Min. Both of them recognise each other but choose not to reveal their real identity. He tells Qi to come to him directly for business deals quoting 200,000 units of grain. In a conversation with his subordinate Zhao Xun, it is revealed that Qi leaked information on the sixteen-year-old Jinzhou massacre case so that the Marquis would re-investigate, driving a wedge between him and the Prime Minister Wei Yan. Now that the Marquis is not dead, Qi intends to win him over to his side. Zhao Xun goes to the Fan house to present Marquis Wu'an the Crown Prince's seal to offer him an alliance, revealing he knows about the Jinzhou massacre case from 16 years ago. Yan Zheng asks for a deposit of 200,000 units of grain. Before Chinese New Year, Yan Zheng teaches Changning how to write when he offered to write Spring Festival couplets. His beautiful calligraphy skills soon attracts the entire neighbourhood to seek his help, including a sheepish Granny Kang. Mr. and Mrs. Zhao, Changyu, Changning, and Yan Zheng celebrate the New Year with dinner and fireworks.
14	"Episode 14"	Qingjie Zeng	March 11, 2026
Changyu drunkenly attempts to kiss Yan Zheng, and when they are about to, Changning enters. Yan Zheng carries Changyu to bed, returning to his room to find that she had left him a red envelope at his pillow. After the food shortage created by the bought-up grain, Prince Changxin sends forces secretly to massacre the nearby Ma village. On the 1st day of Chinese New Year, Qianqian and her son Bao'er visit the Fan house. The children go to play, and a lady (later revealed to be Nanny Lan) tries to identify Bao'er. Qianqian, Changyu, and Yan Zheng realize the children are lost, and upon finding them, end up in a happy snowball fight. Nanny Lan reports back to Qi Min, revealing Bao'er matches the description of his missing son. Qi kidnaps a staff member of Yixiang Restaurant, interrogating her and killing her afterwards. At night, Changyu, Changning, and Yan Zheng go for a walk in the streets. Changyu sees people writing Song Yan's name on candles and picks them up to wipe his name off, trying to save Yan's unassuming devotees. Unfortunately, she runs into Song Yan, who mistakenly believes she still loves him. He offers her a candle, but Magistrate Cui's daughter arrives, so he pretends that Changyu had sought him out. Yan Zheng comes over to defend Changyu, embarrassing Song Yan. Yan Zheng, Changyu, and Changning are walking around the festival when Gongsun saw them from the second floor of a guesthouse and painted a portrait of them. Gongsun and Yan Zheng had a talk about the Prime Minister's son Wei Xuan putting General He in prison. Gongsun asks if it is time for Yan Zheng to return as the Marquis and lead the army.
15	"Episode 15"	Qingjie Zeng	March 11, 2026
Yan Zheng deliberates bringing Changyu and Changning with him, but resolves to leave without them, feeling that Changyu would be confined. Changyu brings Yan Zheng to eat noodles, and seeing that a couple where the women paid for the meals were being gossiped about, lets Yan Zheng pay for their meal. As he does not have small change, he takes out a huge silver ingot instead. Changyu visits her grandfather's home. He has clearly been mistreated, and in anger, she kicks her aunt out of the home, as the title deed now belongs to her grandfather. Changyu's guilt-ridden grandfather breaks down, telling her that her father was not his biological son. Many years ago, Fan Erniu paid Grandfather Fan to assume his dead son's identity, so that Changyu's family could lead a low-profile life. Grand Tutor Li, leader of the Li clan, tells his grandson Lord Li that Prime Minister Wei is hungry for power and must be brought down.
16	"Episode 16"	Qingjie Zeng	March 12, 2026
People gather outside of Yixiang Restaurant after a person is alleged to have died from their food. Qianqian is taken by the police constables to the Magistrate's office. However, it turns out that the Magistrate has been imprisoned as well. Magistrate Cui's daughter begs Changyu to save him. Yan Zheng and Changyu plan to stop the rioters and save Bao'er and Magistrate Cui. It turns out that Sui Yuanqing, the heir apparent to the rebel Prince Changxin, has masqueraded as a grains collection officer. Changyu captures him in exchange for freeing Magistrate Cui. Meanwhile, Yan Zheng and his men intercept the grains to be released to the commoners. At the county town gatehouse and walls, Sui Yuanqing's spies pose as civilian rioters and members of the police. However, they are discovered by Constable Wang and a masked Yan Zheng. In the ensuing battle, they are defeated by a combined force of Yan Zheng, Changyu, the loyal police constables and Zheng's personal guards. Magistrate Cui is freed, but as Yan Zheng fights with Sui Yuanqing, he falls off the wall, trying to grab Changyu down with him. However, Yan Zheng shoots Sui and saves Changyu. He runs after him and tells Changyu to meet him at the usual place. Yan Zheng chases Sui and two of his men, cornering them at a cliff, where his identity as the Marquis of Wu'an is revealed. Sui is shot as he falls down the cliff and is presumably dead. On another front, in the forest nearby the town, tipped off by Yan Zheng, Lord Li leads his soldiers to intercept a large Chongzhou rebel force in disguise. General He and the main Jizhou army arrive in time to relieve the situation. After the battle, Yan Zheng speaks to an injured Lord Li about what happened and their plans. The entire set-up was orchestrated by the Sui brothers to destabilise Jizhou province by 1) causing a shortage of grain, 2) disguising as fake Lin'an constables and Jizhou soldiers to attack the civilians, 3) posing as fake villagers inciting the civilians to riot. Later, Yan Zheng meets Changyu at the place where she first found him months ago.
17	"Episode 17"	Qingjie Zeng	March 11, 2026
Yan Zheng applies medication to Changyu's hand while she tells him that she has prepared clothes, shoes, money, and a divorce agreement, to give both of them closure since he is leaving. Yan Zheng becomes upset, telling her to inform him what kind of men she likes so he can find one for her. She also grows upset and says she would want someone not cold and stubborn. Hurt, he responds by spitefully saying he would marry someone who is gentle and knows how to take care of a home. She attempts to leave, and he grabs her and kisses her. They fight, and eventually Changyu leaves. Heartbroken and weary, he stays at the place where she found him all night. The next day, Changyu cries, upon finding the gifts Yan Zheng left for her birthday, including silver taels and wrist guards that he made for her. The male villagers, including Jin Yuanbao, his crew, and Mr. Zhao, are all conscripted to join the war, much to the distress of the rest of Lin'an. Changyu passes items to Mr. Zhao for Yan Zheng. In the Prime Minister's residence, he, his wife, and his son discuss the alliance between General He and the Marquis of Wu'an. Yan Zheng returns to his army camp as the Marquis, revealing to the officials and the empire that he is alive. Qianqian tells Changyu she and Bao'er are leaving. Bao'er gives Changning a piece of jade that he has always carried. Changning gives Bao'er a grasshopper whistle that Mr. Zhao had carved for her.
18	"Episode 18"	Qingjie Zeng	March 13, 2026
Sui Yuanqing wakes up and realizes he was saved by the Qingfeng Stronghold bandits. He successfully duels their leader, Shi Sanniang, kisses her, and they begin a relationship. Sui takes over the Qingfeng bandits and leads them to attack Lin’an, both to spite Marquis Wu’an and to look for Changyu. During the massacre, he attempts to extract information about Changyu's identity from Constable Wang and Magistrate Cui's daughter, killing them both when they refuse to betray her. However, Madam Song takes Sui to Changyu's house, where Sui kills her. There, Sui sees a portrait of the Fan family and mistakes Changning for Yan Zheng's daughter. He discovers a group of villagers hiding in the Zhaos' cellar, but spares them in exchange for Changyu. After going with him, she stabs Sui and kills the second master of Qingfeng Stronghold. She lures Sui away from the village and jumps down a cliff. Changning, who was not hiding with the rest of the villagers, stumbles upon Granny Kang and her grandson. Kang hides both Changning and her grandson Hu from the bandits, sacrificing herself in the process. At camp, Yan Zheng sees that his falcon had been hurt. He realises Lin'an has been attacked. Furious and fearing for Changyu's safety, he leads a hundred of his Blood Robe Cavalry and destroys the Qingfeng Stronghold. Using her hair ribbon, he sends his falcon to look for Changyu, finding her hanging between the branches below the cliffs, cold and unconscious. Moving to the nearest civilian household, Yan Zheng does gua sha for Changyu's blood flow upon recommendation from the blind old lady owner of the house.
19	"Episode 19"	Qingjie Zeng	March 13, 2026
While guarding Changyu, Xie Zheng's men wonder who she is and her relationship with the Marquis. Xie Zheng helps to clean the unconscious Changyu and asks her to marry him, telling her that her silence means agreement. Changning is found by Shi Sanniang, to Sui Yuanqing's delight. Qi Min finds Qianqian and Bao'er and takes them back to his palace. It is revealed that Qi Min is actually Sui Yuanhai, Prince Changxin's son and Sui Yuanqing's elder brother. He demands that Qianqian be happy with him, threatening Bao'er's life if she chooses not to. Changyu wakes up in the empty house. Thinking that Yan Zheng's soldiers protecting her are imposters, she escapes with the old lady. Changyu seeks Lord Li's help and learns that half of the villagers in Lin’an were killed and Changning is missing. Devastated and grieving deeply, she set up graves for the fallen and decides to seek out her missing sister.
20	"Episode 20"	Qingjie Zeng	March 14, 2026
A month after the massacre of Lin'an, Changyu goes on a hunting spree, saving captured children in hopes of finding Changning. She introduces herself as a pig-butcher before killing the kidnappers and traffickers. She rapidly becomes famous as the Beauty Slaughterer, and many women begin to dress like her and carry butcher knives for protection. Unfortunately, Changyu is still unable to find Changning. She mistakes a father for a child abductor and attacks him. The man reports her to the authorities, and she is arrested. Lord Li lets her out of prison, and she requests that he find the record of her parents' deaths. He does so, and it is confirmed to Changyu that her parents died at the hands of mountain bandits. Lord Li notes privately that the records appear to have been tampered with. Yan Zheng receives asks General He to help save his sister-in-law. To Zheng's surprise, General He immediately knows that he means Changning. General He reveals that he and Fan Erniu were former comrade-in-arms, and that Fan Erniu was not killed by bandits, but died by suicide. Bao'er attempts to connect with his father, Qi Min, but is violently rebuked. Bao'er is shocked when Qi Min orders a maid to be beat to death. Changyu travels westwards towards Chongzhou, searching for her sister. While at her campfire, officers question her destination, asking her why she is heading towards the rebelling province. Despite her protests, Changyu is arrested.
21	"Episode 21"	Qingjie Zeng	March 14, 2026
Bao'er meets Nanny Lan, who is one of the few to genuinely care for him. Bao'er purposefully eats ink to fall sick so he can see his mother. To stop this, Nanny Lan petitions Qi Min for Bao'er to have a playmate, offering Changning. Changyu is placed in a labour camp under General Tang, General He's subordinate. At the quarries, she meets an old man and defends him from the campground bullies. When the bullies turn on her, Jin Yuanbao and his gang from Lin'an confront them. Changyu cries tears of joy upon being reunited with familiar faces. That night, Changyu and the crew reconnect, where Changyu informs them of the massacre at Lin'an and the effects on their respective family members. They swear revenge on Sui Yuanqing. The old man introduces himself as Scholar Tao. He and Changyu talk about his disciple, Jiuheng, and Changyu's husband, Yan Zheng, unaware that the two are the same person. Nanny Lan takes both Bao'er and Changning to see Qianqian. Overjoyed, Qianqian tells the children to pretend to be happy to escape. Qi and Qianqian spend the night together in a hot tub. They remember when Qianqian saved him from drowning, and he fell in love with her. He gifted her a jade pendant which she eventually gave to Bao'er.
22	"Episode 22"	Qingjie Zeng	March 15, 2026
Sui Yuanqing plans to use Changning to draw the Marquis of Wu'an out, as his army outnumbers Yan Zheng's and is encircling them on a mountain to cut off their supplies. Qi Min, after discovering Qianqian's plans to escape, has her locked up. However, Nanny Lan has already escaped with Bao'er. After learning that those who carry extra-large rocks up the mountain are rewarded with meat, Changyu carries rocks herself to secure the food for Tao, Jin, and the rest of the crew. While there, she scouts the area and discovers a dam being built. Tao asks Changyu to scout again and realizes that the Marquis is planning to use the dam to drown the enemy's army. He introduces himself to General Tang as the former Minister of Works and the Grand Tutor, giving pointers to drill the holes for the dam in order to have a better intended effect. Changyu asks Grand Tutor Tao the reasons for his discovery, but he refuses unless he takes her as his disciple, to which she agrees. The general sends half of the camp workers away, under the pretense of going to the frontlines; in reality, those who stayed would die by drowning, and those who left would live. Tao exchanges his lot with Changyu to stay and save her, while the Jin brothers exchange theirs to follow Changyu. However, they learn the truth about the dam and return to save Tao. Sui brings Changning into battle and expects Marquis Wu'an to save his daughter. After Sui realizes Changning is actually the Marquis's sister-in-law, he tries to kill her, but is defeated by the Marquis who skilfully saves Changning with support from Xie Wu. On the Marquis's cue, the dam explodes, and water floods the gorge. Changyu and the Jin brothers stop three spies from sending a signal to Sui, ensuring he is not warned.
23	"Episode 23"	Qingjie Zeng	March 15, 2026
The flood drowns most of Sui's army. Qi runs back to saves Qianqian from the flood. He catches up with Nanny Lan and kills her; however, he is unable to find Bao'er and Zhao Xun. The Marquis and Gongsun find out that the labourers who stopped the enemy spies are called the Northwest Pig-Butcher Team. They also receive news that a second enemy army is moving closer, so they break camp and move to a mountain camp that is easier to defend. Changning is assigned to be cared by Gongsun and Xie Wu. Changyu and the Jin brothers are escorted to a nearby friendly military camp. Changyu reunites with Mr. Zhao at the camp, where he has been working as a blacksmith. Mr. Zhao advises Changyu that he believes Yan Zheng has feelings for her and they should reconcile. Tao arrives at the camp, and after some initial tension, Mr. Zhao gives his respect to Tao for exchanging his lot earlier to save Changyu. The two soon talk like old friends. Lord Li also arrives, reacting with shock that Mr. Zhao, Tao, and Changyu are all at the same camp. The four of them strategize on how to get food supplies to the mountain camp, as it is now under siege by the enemy army. As Lord Li is needed at the camp, Changyu offers to lead the supply run to Marquis Wu'an.
24	"Episode 24"	Qingjie Zeng	March 16, 2026
Two female medics arrive to see Marquis Wu'an. One of them is secretly the Grand Princess. She says the pig-butcher team protected her on the way up the mountain from Sui's forces. She tries to help treat the wounded soldiers, testing medicines on herself due to the shortage of supplies. Gongsun sees Changyu and he brings her to Changning. The sisters tearfully reunite. Gongsun reveals he is the army's strategist and leaves Changyu to help brew medicine for the wounded soldiers. Changyu meets the princess as a medic under the alias "Qi Benggong." Meanwhile, Marquis Wu'an lends his main tent for those lightly wounded, so the medical tents can care for the more seriously wounded soldiers. When Changyu brings medicine to the lightly wounded soldiers, she finally reunites with Yan Zheng. Gongsun stays outside with the other officers, and Xie Wu tells the other soldiers to leave the tent quietly to keep Yan Zheng's identity hidden. Changyu calls for the princess to cure Yan Zheng. The princess realizes Yan Zheng is actually Marquis Wu’an, but keeps his identity hidden from Changyu. Changyu tends to Yan Zheng's wounds. She laments that she did not divorce him earlier so that he would not have to serve in the army. They promise to stay together, and Yan Zheng apologizes for his behavior the night they separated. Gongsun enters to talk to Yan Zheng, while Changyu thinks of a solution for the salt and meat shortage to help him heal faster. Gongsun warned Yan Zheng about keeping his identity a secret, and helped arrange a private tent for him and Changyu.
25	"Episode 25"	Qingjie Zeng	March 17, 2026
Gongsun tells Changyu about the private tent and gives taels to Changyu under the pretext of rewarding her for bringing supplies. The princess and Yan Zheng talk about hiding his identity when they are interrupted by Changyu, who is delivering medicine. They play it off as Yan Zheng teaching Marquis Wu'an how to hide secret money, and the Princess leaves. He and Changyu spend time together and kiss. The Princess faints from testing the medicines on herself, and Gongsun cares for her. Sui's army roasts meat at the bottom of the mountain in order to lower Yan Zheng's army's morale, who have run out of meat and have resorted to hunting wild game. Changyu goes to visit a locked-up Sui, capturing him and holding him hostage in full view of his army. She and the Jin brothers beat him in front of them, humiliating and threatening to castrate him unless his army hands over their food. Changyu returns a hero, but because she had violated military rules and nearly interrupted their plans, Marquis Wu'an has one of his personal guards (Xie Jiu) masquerade as him in order to enforce military discipline. The fake Marquis Wu’an sentences 20 cane strokes to punish Changyu and the pig butcher team, and Yan Zheng offers to take the caning as Changyu's husband.
26	"Episode 26"	Qingjie Zeng	March 18, 2026
The Princess quickly enters with a tale of extenuating circumstances and says that she should be punished instead. Before she can kneel, Gongsun enters with another story of extenuating circumstances. Gongsun argues that if not for Changyu's removal of Sui from the cave, the enemy would have saved Sui. No one needed to be punished. News about Mrs. Fan's superhuman strength spreads across the camp. Changyu cooks for the camp and brings food to Yan Zheng. He hints to her of the possibility of him being a high-ranking officer one day and asked if she would be okay with it. She says she would be. Sui's army begins to launch a full assault on the camp, and the men are called to battle. Gongsun gives Princess the book of Go instructions, she hugs him and tells him to return safely. Changyu helps Yan Zheng change into his military outfit. But before he can go, she drugs him and wears his armour in order to take his place. She tells Changning to watch him and awaken him later. Once at the battlefield, Xie Wu realizes that it is Changyu in armour. He orders her to the reserves, instructing the pig-butchering squad to protect her. He then has his fellow guard Xie Jiu to seek out the Marquis and tell him that "Her Ladyship" (Changyu) has gone to the front lines. Elsewhere, Gongsun is in a stand-off with Shi Yue (a general of Sui's army) and taunts Sui while playing a guzheng. Meanwhile, the rest of the army is losing against another enemy general, Shi Hu. To save Xie Wu, Changyu attacks Shi Hu. Recognizing her as the woman who humiliated Sui, he attempts to kill her. Changyu fights him with her butcher knives, disarming him and killing him with two blows from his own weapon. Her butcher knives are shattered in the fight. Upon realizing their general is dead, Sui's army flees. Yan Zheng awakens, cutting his palm to drain the effects of the drug and rushing to the scene. When he arrives, the surviving army hails him joyfully as the Marquis Wu’an. Dumbfounded, Changyu realizes Yan Zheng is the Marquis Wu’an.
27	"Episode 27"	Qingjie Zeng	March 19, 2026
Changyu and Yan Zheng fight, as she is furious that he hid his identity from her. Upon returning to camp, Changyu discovers that Man Di, one of the Jin brothers, had been stabbed in the chest by a young Chongzhou soldier she had spared, and is recovering. Sui is saved by his general Shi Yue, but they learn of Shi Hu's death at the hands of Changyu. Gongsun is injured in the battle but sends news to the princess that he is in grave danger so she can treat him. Grand Tutor Tao comes to visit Gongsun and they realize they both know Fan Changyu. Xie Zheng visits Changyu's tent and explains himself to her. She does not blame him, but she feels that as a butcher's daughter she is not a good match for him. He takes his personal badge, kneels and puts it in Changyu's hand and reintroduces himself as Xie Zheng, courtesy name Jiuheng, and asks for her hand in marriage. Changyu rejects him, and heartbroken, he leaves. He runs into Grand Tutor Tao, his teacher. They have tea together, and Zheng asks if Master Tao can adopt his wife as a goddaughter. Master Tao agrees, and they realize his wife is also Master Tao's disciple. That night, neither Zheng nor Changyu can sleep. Zheng goes night fishing and Changyu goes for a night walk. They meet and talk over a campfire. Xie Zheng suggests they spar and gives her tips on fighting techniques before grilling fish he had caught. Xie Zheng explains that due to the risks of being in the military, he did not want to marry anybody in fear of leaving them a widow. However, ever since he met Changyu, he is now a little afraid to die. He asks what her plans were after the war. Changyu says to find Qianqian and Bao'er, to bring home the surviving villagers, and to rebuild Lin’an. Xie Zheng swears he will join her, as the days he spent in Lin'an were the happiest of his life.
28	"Episode 28"	Qingjie Zeng	March 20, 2026
Xie Zheng uses Changyu's broken butcher knives to forge a pair of dual swords for her. He cuts himself with it, as according to superstition, a sword must taste blood so as not to go against its master. While Bao'er and Zhao Xun are on the run, Bao'er identifies the road tracks to Xie Zheng's army and says they should seek help from them. His keen observations and brave strategic decisions at such a young age, inspire Zhao Xun that the boy is the chosen one. Grand Tutor Tao goes to see the Fan sisters and predicts that Changning will have a noble and fortunate life in the future. Tao speaks to Changyu privately and offers to adopt her as his goddaughter. She accepts, to Tao's joy. Tao presents Changyu with the courtesy name “Shanjun”, meaning Tigress of the Mountain. Changyu tells the princess she is leaving and asks her to take Changning and Mr. Zhao back to Mrs. Zhao in Lin'an. Changyu writes a letter to Xie Zheng, telling him that she and the pig-butcher team are leaving. He chases after her on horseback. They kiss and talk all night over a campfire. Xie Zheng gifts Changyu the reforged swords. Leaving Changyu at dawn, Xie Zheng orders his guard officer Xie Qi to lead a detachment to follow his wife secretly. He and Gongsun decide to march to Lucheng. Prince Changxin scolds Qi Min (his eldest son Sui Yuanhuai), for his two failed battles, stating that he will never be the crown prince even in the event of his brother's death. Bao'er and Zhao Xun are chased by Sui Yuanhuai's assassins, but Xie Zheng and his troops saves them. Zhao Xun informs Xie Zheng that Sui Yuanhuai is the real imperial crown prince. He reveals that the fire which burnt Qi Min in the Eastern palace was set by the Crown Princess herself in order to give him a chance at survival. In an end-credits scene, the princess finds a new wound on Changyu's neck while helping her put medication on her back. Changyu abruptly realizes it was a hickey from the night that she and Xie Zheng kissed at the campfire.
29	"Episode 29"	Qingjie Zeng	March 21, 2026
Zhao Xun reveals that after the Jinzhou massacre, Prince Changxin's wife took Sui Yuanhuai to the palace to keep the widowed Crown Princess company. However, when the fire broke out, it was reported that both the Crown Princess and her son Qi Min (the son of Crown Prince Chengde) died, whilst Changxin's eldest son was severely burned and went into seclusion. Xie Zheng deduces that the real Sui Yuanhuai died in the fire, and that Prince Changxin never figured out that Qi Min has replaced him. Zhao Xun reveals that Qi Min knew of Xie Zheng's identity back in Lin'an and wanted to use him to kill Sui Yuanqing and become the Crown Prince. Yu Qianqian is revealed to be Qi Min's former concubine, making Bao'er the Imperial Great Grandson. However, what happened at the Jinzhou massacre remains unknown. Elsewhere, a captive Qianqian confronts Qi Min for his tyranny. He reveals that his mother pressed his face into a burning brazier before dying in the fire, all so he could pretend that he was the real Sui Yuanhuai. Qi Min describes how he attempted to make the Xie and Wei families destroy each other, alongside Prince Changxin's family, to exact revenge for the deaths of his own family. He shows Qianqian half of a tiger tally, which he hints is irrefutable evidence of the Jinzhou massacre. That night, Qianqian drugs Qi Min and flees, but fortunately encounters Changyu on the road. Qi Min chases after them, but Xie Qi (tasked by Xie Zheng to follow Changyu) and General He rescue them both. General He invites them to Lucheng and mentions that he and Changyu's father were close friends. Through General He's flashbacks, it is revealed that sixteen years ago, when Wei Yan was a general, he sent Wei Qilin to Prince Changxin for troops and grain to reinforce Prince Chengde. However, the tiger tally Wei Yan gave Wei Qilin did not match the one Prince Changxin owned, so the prince did not send troops. As a result, Wei Qilin was branded a traitor. General He recalls how he helped Wei Qilin name his daughter Changyu, revealing that Wei Qilin is Fan Changyu's father. General He presents Changyu with a custom suit of armor, and asks her to join them in battle. Torn, Changyu consults her adoptive father Tao. He explains that in war, minimizing casualties is the best course of action. Qianqian informs Gongsun that Qi Min owns a tiger tally. Xie Zheng leads a full assault against Prince Changxin outside of Lucheng while General He defends the Lucheng city walls. Lord Li (who arrived a few days prior) is tasked to lead reinforcements at the rear. While leaving to go back to Lin'an with the other townspeople, Changyu and the Jin brothers change their mind, returning to Lucheng to assist in the battle.
30	"Episode 30"	Qingjie Zeng	March 21, 2026
Flying General He's flag to confuse the enemy, Changyu and her pig butcher squad join Lord Li's reinforcement squadron and catch the rebels off guard. They win, but Lord Li is injured in the skirmish. As Lord Li stubbornly refuses to back down, Changyu knocks out the injured lord and assumes control of the squadron. Changyu and Xie Zheng's forces reunite on the battlefield. She attacks Sui Yuanqing while he attacks Prince Changxin. Sui kills Man Di, one of the Jin brothers, and Prince Changxin orders Sui to attack the city. Xie Zheng chases after Sui to protect the city, and orders his general Xie Wu to protect Changyu. Changyu stops Prince Changxin from pursuing Xie Zheng, and they fight. He hints that her father was the infamous traitor Wei Qilin, and Changyu falters in shock. Thanks to Xie Wu's timely intervention, however, Changyu is able to disarm and kill the rebel Prince. In the aftermath of the battle, Princess Qi takes care of Changyu's wounds and reveals to her that she is the Grand Princess Royal. Although the battle was won, General He had died heroically to save Lucheng. A now-awake Lord Li visits Changyu and is furious that she kept him out of the battle, not allowing him to avenge General He. He hands her a letter from General He and leaves, declaring that there is no need for them to meet again. The letter from General He turns out to be a suicide note written by Changyu's father to the late general. Her father had asked to protect his two daughters. Changyu realizes her father was the infamous traitor Wei Qilin, who was cursed across the empire for cutting off the grain supply of the army. 100,000 men, as well as the Crown Prince, starved to death, and the city of Jinzhou fell. The body of General Xie Linshan (Xie Zheng's father) had been hung on the city wall. Sui Yuanqing manages to escape the battlefield and hides at the house of a cousin. His uncle attempts to poison him, but his cousin reveals the plot. Sui kills the whole family, sparing only his cousin, and she takes the poison herself. Shi Sanniang, Sui's girlfriend, watches this carefully. Later, Qi Min finds Sui and informs him that Changyu was the killer of Prince Changxin. Infuriated, Sui swears revenge.
31	"Episode 31"	Qingjie Zeng	March 22, 2026
Changyu goes to pay respects to Generals He and General Xie Linshan (Xie Zheng's late father). She attempts to stop the other general from cursing Wei Qilin, and Xie Zheng comes to her rescue. As Marquis Wu’an, the most respected commander in the empire, he orders the other generals to keep quiet and pay respects to Generals He and Xie. Later, when Xie Zheng comes to look for Changyu in her room, she acts distant out of fear that her father's reputation as a traitor would affect him as the Marquis. The next day, Lord Li comes to look for Changyu. He apologizes for his anger with her by kneeling and giving her thorn sticks to whip him with. She snaps them apart as an act of friendship. Back at Lin'an, in a safehouse, the Zhaos, Changning, and Bao'er are all reunited with Qianqian. The army is called together to receive the imperial reward of their military merits, proclaimed by the Imperial Eunuch Li Xiang. Lord Li is to take General He's position as the Military Administrator of Jinzhou. Changyu will be his deputy as a captain general of fifth rank, the highest military rank ever awarded to a woman. Both the Jizhou and Yanzhou armies receives a financial reward as well for their role in the victory. Gongsun nearly confesses his feelings to the princess, but ultimately says nothing. Lord Li attempts to arrange for the best military tutors for the newfound General Fan Changyu, but most of them give up after teaching her.
32	"Episode 32"	Qingjie Zeng	March 22, 2026
To stop the rumours of romance among their soldiers, Lord Li declares that Changyu is his sworn sister. Imperial Eunuch Li Xiang goes to deliver the message that the Emperor wants the princess and Marquis Wu’an to marry. Neither the princess nor Xie Zheng agree to the match. Xie Zheng cuts the Eunuch's ear off as a warning, however word spreads fast of his supposed status as Prince Consort, further saddening Changyu. Sui Yuanqing appears at Marquis Wu'an's camp with only a few men in order to take revenge for his father's death, but is unsuccessful. When Sui's mother Princess Changxin hears that Sui Yuanqing has been captured, she confronts Qi Min. After she reveals venomously that she knew the entire time that he was not her son, he kills her in retaliation. Changyu and Xie Zheng search for Qi Min, who has faked his death with a body double. Unbeknownst to them, Lord Li has turned traitor, allying himself with Qi Min due to his loyalty to the Li clan. Xie Zheng and Gongsun discuss the massacre that had occurred sixteen years ago, questioning if Wei Qilin was truly a traitor. Xie Zheng goes to look for Changyu in her room and reaffirms his love for her. He reveals that he knows she is Qilin's daughter, and asks if her origins were bothering her. He promises to continue investigating the matter to be with her. Xie Zheng tells Changyu he plans to let Sui Yuanqing escape so that he can lead them to Qi Min. True to plan, Zhao Xun informs Sui of his mother's death at the hands of Qi Min. Sui grows furious and swears revenge for the deaths of both his parents.
33	"Episode 33"	Qingjie Zeng	March 23, 2026
Xie Zheng visits Lord Li and hints that he is aware of Li's alliance with Qi Min. Out for revenge, Sui Yuanqing hunts down Qi Min and a vicious fight ensues between their forces. Sui ultimately hesitates to kill Qi, and Qi takes the chance to stab Sui in the chest. Before Sui dies, Shi Sanniang finds him and confesses her love for him. He does not return her feelings, but he gives her half of the tiger tally he had secretly kept. Sui then cuts his own throat so Shi Sanniang can take his head and tally to Fan Changyu, giving her a way out of her fugitive life. At the capital, Grand Tutor Li attempts to have the Prime Minister Wei executed for Xie Zheng's threat of rebellion against the imperial decree. However, news arrives of the death of Changxin and his sons, so the Emperor decides to reward both Changyu and Zheng. General Fan Changyu hosts a departure feast to honor the princess's return to the capital. Gongsun confesses his feelings to the princess and proposes marriage to her. Overjoyed, she accepts. Elsewhere in the camp, a drunken Changyu and Zheng kiss passionately. In the capital, Grand Tutor Li's youngest grandson taunts Prime Minister Wei's son Wei Xuan for his failure on the battlefield. He alleges that Wei Xuan is not his father's son, and that Wei Xuan never stopped loving his childhood sweetheart Lady Qi Rongyin. A fight begins between the two.
34	"Episode 34"	Qingjie Zeng	March 24, 2026
Prime Minister Wei and Grand Tutor Li request an audience before the Emperor about the incident. The Emperor attempts to defuse the situation and threatens to abdicate if they do not resolve their differences. The situation resolves, although not without consequences. Grand Tutor Li, disillusioned with the Emperor, resolves to no longer ally with him. Prime Minister Wei reopens the investigation into Jinzhou. He has his son Wei Xuan flogged eighteen times as punishment, before being confronted for his favouritism towards Xie Zheng over his own son. The princess comes to the Emperor's room and scolds him for trying to marry her off for political power. The Emperor, who is fully aware of the Li and Wei factions both attempting to manipulate him, breaks down. In a panic, he runs to Prime Minister Wei's house, swearing his loyalty and trust in him while confronting him about Qi Min's continued existence. Wei dismisses the Eastern Palace fire as a rumour and encourages him to bring Changyu into the capital to receive military rewards and ensure she does not ally herself with the Li clan. General Fan Changyu is given a grand welcome parade into the capital along with the Jin brothers. At her meeting with the Emperor, he appoints her as the Flower Crowned General with fourth rank, to the chagrin of the officials. Both sides make snide comments, and she rebukes both the Li and Wei factions. Lord Li speaks to his grandfather, concerned about supporting Qi Min as he believes Qi Min is a cruel man who will make a horrible tyrant of an emperor. However, the Grand Tutor still believes that his cruelty is not as great as Prime Minister Wei's, and orders his grandson to stay the course. After Changyu socializes with the other officers, she leaves to go for a walk on her own. She runs into Xie Zheng, who kisses her and promises to help her clear her father's name. Meanwhile, Prime Minister Wei informs the emperor of the existence of Qi Min. Grand Tutor Li resolves to pit Xie Zheng and Wei Yan against each other, starting a rumour that a letter between Wei Yan and Lady Qi led to the death of Xie Zheng's father.
35	"Episode 35"	Qingjie Zeng	March 25, 2026
There is an attack on the Lin'an safehouse, where Qianqian, Bao'er, Changning, and the Zhaos are staying. Xie Qi and his guards manage to fight off Qi Min's assassins but Qianqian and Bao'er are kidnapped (although Bao'er escapes again). Qianqian nearly dies from her injuries, and Qi furiously forces every physician staying nearby within 100 li to save her. Once Qianqian is finally healing, Qi happily presents her with Zisu, Qianqian's long-time favourite maid. Song Yan, who has been working at the Ministry of Rites as a ninth-rank scholar, is hired at the palace to give the new general etiquette lessons. He is dumbfounded to see that Fan Changyu, the butcher girl he had rejected back in Lin'an, is the general. She coolly orders him gone, and he stumbles out, only to be greeted by the Jin brothers, now seventh-rank imperial guards. Finally, he runs into Xie Zheng on the way out and, not realizing that he is the Marquis Wu’an, insults him for following Changyu's fame and glory. Song Yan's supervisor quickly pulls him down and greets the Marquis Wu’an, causing Song Yan to faint from shock. Xie Zheng takes Changyu to visit the capital at night. He brings her to a private pavilion to view the fireworks. Xie Zheng receives an edict to return to the Capital, as his presence has been discovered (returning to the Capital without an imperial edict is a punishable offense). Xie Zheng returns to his army and meets with Grand Tutor Tao. He prepares to face Prime Minister Wei in the capital. Meanwhile, Qi Min has returned to the capital and reveals to Grand Tutor Li that his men have infiltrated Xie Zheng's army. Jin's brothers send word that the emperor plans to make Changyu his royal consort. Changyu tries to dissuade the emperor by talking about butchering pigs. Nothing works until she mentions that she will have to divorce Xie Zheng, and the emperor hastily asks her to forget about the proposal. The Princess reveals to her mother, the empress dowager, that she knows of a maid who witnessed the palace fire seventeen years ago; however, she was told to stay silent out of fear of the Prime Minister. The emperor vows to prevent Xie Zheng's Yanzhou army and Fan Changyu's Jizhou army from joining to avoid another rebellion.
36	"Episode 36"	Qingjie Zeng	March 26, 2026
Marquis Wu’an arrives at the Capital with a grand welcome parade. Changyu, Jin Yuanbao, and the brothers watch through a window above. The people of the capital loudly debate who is better: the Marquis Wu’an, or the Flower Crowned General Fan. Xie Zheng goes to visit his mother's memorial and runs into his uncle, Prime Minister Wei. His uncle confronts him for marrying Wei Qilin's daughter. Wei declares that in accordance with the family rules for filial piety, Zheng must be punished for his disloyalty with 108 whippings. Zheng agrees, but swears the punishment will be his final act of loyalty to repay the man who raised him. Prime Minister Wei accepts. Afterwards, as Zheng lies bleeding on the ground, Changyu bursts in. She declares that Zheng is her husband, and she is his marchioness. Pleased, Zheng presents Changyu to the memorials of his parents and of the Xie ancestors. Xie Zheng's aunt (Prime Minister Wei's wife) arrives, and he introduces Changyu as his wife. That night, Changyu takes care of Zheng. Now that he has fulfilled his obligation to his uncle, the two can complete the traditional marriage rituals and be wed. Qianqian is held captive in the capital with Qi Min. Qi plans to make Qianqian the empress once he takes the throne. Qianqian refuses unless he begs on his knees. Qi does so, and they kiss. The next morning, Qianqian cuts the tiger tally from Qi's neck and tells her maid Zisu to bring it to Changyu. She gives Zisu money so that she may escape the city and live comfortably for the rest of her life. Xie Zheng receives a message from Gongsun, informing him that Prime Minister Wei had an affair with a royal consort. Meanwhile, Wei Yan reflects on his past and how he and his childhood sweetheart Qi Rongyin were meant to marry, but she was called to the Emperor's harem. Grand Tutor Li has Lord Li imprisoned.
37	"Episode 37"	Qingjie Zeng	March 27, 2026
The Emperor hosts a banquet to celebrate the return of Marquis Wu’an. He gifts him the Longquan sword (with imperial approval to punish all wrongdoers) but Xie Zheng gives it back to him, stating he cannot accept it. After an eunuch spills water on Xie Zheng at the banquet, he leaves to change. Zheng takes the opportunity to meet the princess's witness: the maid from the Qingyuan Palace who watched the fires start seventeen years ago. Unfortunately, they discover the maid in a delirious state. The setup turns out to be a trap, and Zheng and the princess are drugged by an aphrodisiac. Xie Zheng cuts himself to slow the effects and fights his way out of the palace. Changyu finds him in the imperial garden and saves the now-highly drugged Xie Zheng. Eunuch Li returns to the banquet and accuses Xie Zheng of drunkenly attempting to violate the maid. However, he is rebuked by the Emperor. While searching for Xie Zheng, the emperor and the ministers discover that the Qingyuan Palace has been set on fire, and the grand princess is still inside. Gongsun appears to save the Princess and gives her mouth-to-mouth resuscitation. A furious Empress Dowager orders a cover-up of the fire, and threatens all of the ministers, including the emperor, with death. Back in the now-empty banquet hall, Grand Tutor Li blames Prime Minister Wei for starting the fire. Xie Zheng and Changyu return to the banquet hall and were accused of starting the fire. Suddenly, Lord Li is brought in as the culprit of the fire. He stated that he came into the palace to confess his feelings for the princess, foiling Grand Tutor Li's plans to frame Xie Zheng. The emperor shifts the blame onto Eunuch Li, and Xie Zheng uses the Longquan sword to kill him. After everyone leaves, Prime Minister Wei warns the emperor not to play with fire, as the late emperor once did.
38	"Episode 38"	Qingjie Zeng	March 28, 2026
Changyu takes Xie Zheng back home to sober up. As a lingering effect of the aphrodisiac, he continues kissing her, and they consummate their marriage. That night, Xie Zheng finally has a good dream about his mother. Upon waking up, he tells Changyu that he will formally marry her into the family. Grand Tutor Li, the mastermind behind the framing plot, meets with Qi Min, who set the palace on fire. Qi Min tells the grand tutor that he has prepared a fake tiger tally for Changyu. The princess wakes up and thanks Gongsun for saving her. Changyu receives the tiger tally that Qianqian cut from Qi Min's neck from Zisu, Qianqian's loyal maid. Unfortunately, Zisu dies of her injuries, having being shot by one of Qi Min's assassins. Shi Sanniang also arrives, handing Changyu the other half of the tiger tally and Sui Yuanqing's head. Changyu arranges for Shi Sanniang to have a new travel pass and thanks her for taking care of Changning. Qi reveals to Qianqian that he knows she stole the tiger tally and, after she rebukes him, decides to chain himself to her. Xie Zheng and Changyu discuss the meaning of the tiger tallies. Changyu decides to beat the petition drum to seek an appeal to the emperor. If her petition is rejected, she will be beheaded. She is required to march through the streets before doing so and is vilified by the crowd (thanks to a strategic rumour, they know she is the daughter of Wei Qilin). Lord Li and the Jin brothers escort her. Meanwhile, Xie Zheng goes to his parents' memorial to seek forgiveness. He finds his mother's suicide note. It reveals how she discovered that her brother Prime Minister Wei had returned to the capital on a note from Lady Qi, causing both the fall of Jinzhou and her husband's death. The late emperor was pressuring Wei Yan with the lives of the soldiers to admit his guilt. Feeling caught between her brother and husband, she hoped that her death would trigger her brother's conscience and allow the young Xie Zheng a chance to live. Changyu is taken to an audience with the emperor and his ministers. There, Changyu presents the matching tiger tallies, arguing that someone must have deliberately delayed the sending of troops. However, Prime Minister Wei appears, revealing her as Wei Qilin's daughter and accusing her of attempting to destabilize the court. He orders her execution. Xie Zheng arrives, defending Changyu and accusing Prime Minister Wei of attempted rebellion. He presents the letter written by Consort Qi to Prime Minister Wei, detailing his abandonment of the soldiers. Elsewhere, Qi Min and Grand Tutor Li initiate their coup.
39	"Episode 39"	Qingjie Zeng	March 29, 2026
As the original maker of the tiger tallies, Grand Tutor Tao is brought to court to authenticate the tallies. He announces them as genuine, and the emperor orders Prime Minister Wei's execution. In response, Wei's men storm the court. The attack is interrupted, however, by a messenger announcing Qi Min's arrival at the gate. Xie Zheng and Prime Minister Wei resolve to quell the rebellion first before settling their dispute. Grand Tutor Li and Qi's men storm the palace, heralding Qi Min as the rightful emperor and seating him on the throne. The emperor passes the imperial seal to Qi Min, begging for his life. Xie Zheng and Prime Minister Wei temporarily join forces. Qi attempts to convince Marquis Wu'an to join him but Xie Zheng rebukes him, revealing that Qi has struck a secret deal to offer Great Yin's territories to Beijue (their northern barbarian enemies). Xie Zheng replies Qi Min's father - the Crown Prince Chengde - lord of the Eastern Palace, would rather die honourably than submit to Beijue, hence Xie Zheng will never serve Qi Min. Grand Tutor Li faints on the spot, realizing what Qi has done. Prime Minister Wei's wife and son Wei Xuan are taken hostage, but Xie Zheng shoots two arrows to kill their captors. While their armies storm the palace, Wei Yan and Xie Zheng face off in a duel, not allowing their men to interfere. Lord Li saves the emperor. Changyu arrives to rescue Qianqian. When a volley of arrows is shot towards them, Qi blocks the shots for Qianqian and falls off the building. However, he drags Qianqian along as they are still chained together. While Changyu is holding onto Qianqian, she cannot hold both their weights. In a rare moment of selflessness, Qi breaks his thumb, allowing the chain to slip off his hand and he falls to the ground. Qianqian is saved. Meanwhile, Xie Zheng disarms Prime Minister Wei and is about to kill him when Prime Minister Wei's subordinate fires an arrow at him. However, Wei's son Wei Xuan blocks the shot and dies in the attempt (repaying Xie Zheng for saving both him and his mother earlier). The other loyal imperial armies arrive at the palace. Prime Minister Wei accepts his defeat, and his forces surrender. Three days later, Xie Zheng's aunt asks him for mercy on Prime Minister Wei's behalf and explains that the prime minister married her to save her and her then-unborn son's lives. Wei Xuan's father had been a soldier in Prime Minister Wei's army. Bound to uphold the imperial law, Xie Zheng cannot promise her this mercy.. With the princess' help, Changyu goes to seek the Empress Dowager for the truth and discovers that while the Princess Consort started the fire to let Qi Min live, the late emperor had been the one who burnt Lady Qi to death, as she was accused of being pregnant with Prime Minister Wei's child. On the eve of Prime Minister Wei's execution, Grand Tutor Tao visits Prime Minister Wei in prison. He asks for the truth, because he knows the prime minister is covering up for the late emperor. Wei Yan explains that his careless words at a banquet with Crown Prince Chengde sowed the seeds of disaster. In a flashback, Crown Prince Chengde is seen at a banquet with his ministers. He wanted to go to the frontier with General Xie Linshan to achieve merit for his father. A drunken Wei, annoyed at the Emperor's favouritism of others over Chengde, proposes having him abdicate.
40	"Episode 40"	Qingjie Zeng	March 30, 2026
Following on the banquet in the flashback, Crown Prince Chengde is seen feasting with his ministers. He asks them to forget Wei's careless words, but the truth leaks out regardless. The late Emperor is informed, and plots with Prince Changxin to have Chengde killed. Prime Minister Wei reveals that the letter he received from Lady Qi had been forged by the late emperor, all so that Wei would delay getting reinforcements and enter the palace to save her from the fire. Lady Qi died in that fire, and Wei realized that without swift action, he would be labelled a traitor and cause his whole clan's extermination. Hence he staged a coup and forced the late emperor to abdicate in order to stabilize the realm. However, the late emperor had schemed too meticulously with Prince Changxin, and Jinzhou still fell to the Beijue enemies, due to lack of supplies and reinforcements. Wei Yan was forced to shift the blame to Wei Qilin, his most trusted subordinate. Wei reveals that when Qi Min leaked information to have Xie Zheng investigate the case, Wei Yan tried to silence the Fan daughters in order to protect the bond between uncle and nephew. However, as fate would have it, Fan Changyu had been the one to save Xie Zheng. Sitting nearby out of sight, Xie Zheng and Changyu overheard the whole story and finally learnt the truth. Yu Qianqian visited Qi Min in his cell. She presented him with poisoned soup, which Qi knowingly drinks. He admits he fell in love with Qianqian because she accepted him and did not disregard him because of his burn scars. He dies in her arms. As time passes, the fate of various characters are decided. Emperor Qi Sheng becomes insane and regresses to a child-like state of mind, unable to recognize anyone. As the only eligible descendant of imperial lineage, Yu Bao'er ascends to the throne and is crowned emperor, with Qianqian as Empress Dowager Yu. Xie Zheng is appointed as Prince Regent and Changyu as Grand General, with the rank of First-Rank Lady Protector of the State. All three will serve as key advisers in governing the empire until the emperor is of age. Wei Qilin and General Meng Shuyuan are posthumously declared innocent and honoured as the Earl of Zhongyang and Marquis of Wusu respectively. Lord Li gives away the family wealth to the empire to seek forgiveness for the Li clan, while he accepts exile to the frontier. Grand Tutor Li realizes the gravity of his sins, having played the villain for no gain. Months later, Grand Tutor Tao visits Prime Minister Wei in prison and presents him with poison wine on behalf of Xie Zheng as a merciful death for his crimes. Wei Yan drinks it, recalling a pleasant last meal with Xie Zheng. Later, Changning and Bao'er hide behind the throne and eat sweets. She asks if she could be a princess in the future, and Bao'er asks if she would prefer to be empress instead. They make a pinky promise. In Lin’an, Changyu and Xie Zheng return to visit Mr. and Mrs. Zhao and their other neighbours. The spirits of all those who died in the Lin'an massacre are seen waving happily upon their return. Changyu calls Mr. and Mrs. Zhao her godfather and godmother. The Jin and Man brothers also come to acknowledge the Zhao couple. Xie Zheng and Fan Changyu have become local legends, and a matchmaking tree is made in Lin'an from their story. Five years later, Xie Zheng and Changyu, who now have two children, lead their army to defend against the invading Beijue barbarians. In an end credits scene, there is an alternate ending where seventeen years ago, both the Jinzhou military defeat and Wei's coup did not happen. Xie Zheng's father is alive, his wife and Changyu's mothers are friends, and Lady Xie asks her son to make Changyu her daughter-in-law. Sixteen years later, Xie Zheng and Prime Minister Wei discuss the war with the Beijue enemies and the Emperor's increasing suspicions. In this alternate timeline, Qi Min is an honourable and benevolent Crown Prince. Qi Min, Wei Changyu, Xie Zheng, Gongsun Li, and the Grand Princess all visit Yixiang Restaurant in Lin'an. Changyu and Zheng are betrothed, as well as Gongsun and the princess. Upon meeting Qianqian, Qi Min is physically repulsed, vomiting non-stop, and mutters that they must have been enemies in a past life.

== Soundtrack ==
Part	Title		Artist	Lyricist	Composer	Notes
Part	English	Chinese	Artist	Lyricist	Composer	Notes
1.	"Careful with Fate"	我对缘分小心翼翼	JJ Lin	Vincent Fang	JJ Lin	Theme song
2.	"I Searched For Him A Thousand Times in the Crowd"	众里寻他千百度	Zhang Bichen	Xin Qiji	Dong Dongdong	
3.	"Clear as Me"	清清如我	Yisa Yu	Chen Xi	Dong Dongdong	
4.	"Road Ahead"	前路	Huang Xiaoyun	Chen Xi	Dong Dongdong	
5.	"What's Done is Done"	木已成丹	Zhang Yuan	Chen Xi	Dong Dongdong	
6.	"A Single Thought"	一念	Zhang Zining, Li Xinyi	Chen Xi	Dong Dongdong	
7.	"Rising Storm"	风云起	Xu Hebin	Chen Xi	Dong Dongdong	

== Release ==
Pursuit of Jade was released worldwide on 6 March 2026 on Tencent Video, iQIYI, and Netflix. On 8 March 2026, it was released on Dragon TV.

== Reception ==
=== Rating ===
The series recorded heat indexes exceeding 31,000 on Tencent and 10,000 on iQIYI within one week of its broadcast. Upon its release, the series debuted at number six on Netflix's Global Top 10 Non-English Shows chart.

=== Critical and public response ===
The drama was praised for its engagement of the "femme gaze," a prominent element in director Zeng Qingjie's prior work. The series received praise for its an inverted fairy tale plot structure with a supernaturally strong female main character and a supernaturally handsome male main character.

Chinese magazine CNA Lifestyle noted that beauty of the lead actor, Zhang Linghe, is emphasized in both in the dialogue as well as filming choices, in ways that are specific to its genre of Chinese drama and that resonate with historical Chinese idealized forms of masculinity, such as the novel Dream Of The Red Chamber's main character, Jia Baoyu.

While the series was highly successful, it also faced some mockery and criticism from critics, social media and some official publications, regarding the male lead character's visual appearances, especially during battle scenes. The military newspaper People's Liberation Army Daily noted the male lead character's visual appearance as "excessively softened and deliberately refined, with some even wearing rouge and powder." The social media post of the propaganda office of the Zhejiang Provincial Committee of the Chinese Communist Party stated that such images could have "an adverse impact on the aesthetic and cultural values of young people." On the other hand, official broadcaster, China Central Television, was among the broadcasting and media outlets that gave praise to the series.
