= Kim Sung-hoon (director) =

South Korean film director (born 1974)

- Born: 1974 (age 51–52); South Korea
- Occupation: Film director

Korean name
- Hangul: 김성훈
- RR: Gim Seonghun
- MR: Kim Sŏnghun

Kim Sung-hoon (Korean: 김성훈; born 1974) is a South Korean film director debuted with the musical drama film My Little Hero (2013). His second feature was the fast-paced action film Confidential Assignment (2017) which starred Hyun Bin. A box office hit with more than 7.8 million admissions and grossing over US$56.4 million, the film was sold to 42 territories, including the U.S., the Middle East, India, the Philippines and Mongolia.

== Filmography ==
- Love (1999) - assistant director
- My Little Hero (2013) - director
- Confidential Assignment (2017) - director
- Rampant (2018) - director
- Chief Detective 1958 (2024) (TV series) – director
- Gold Land (2026) (TV Series) - director

== Awards and nominations ==
| Year | Award | Category | Nominated work | Result |
|---|---|---|---|---|
| 2017 | Brilliant Korean Film Star Award | Best Director | Confidential Assignment | Won |
| 2026 | Global OTT Awards | Best Director | Gold Land | Nominated |
