= Confidential Assignment =

- Theatrical release poster
- Hangul: 공조
- Hanja: 共助
- Lit.: Cooperation
- RR: Gongjo
- MR: Kongjo
- Directed by: Kim Sung-hoon
- Written by: Yoon Hyun-ho
- Produced by: Yoon Je-kyoon
- Starring: Hyun Bin; Yoo Hae-jin; Kim Joo-hyuk; Jang Young-nam; Im Yoon-ah
- Cinematography: Lee Sung-jae
- Edited by: Jin Lee
- Music by: Hwang Sang-joon
- Production company: JK Film
- Distributed by: CJ Entertainment
- Release date: January 18, 2017
- Running time: 125 minutes
- Country: South Korea
- Language: Korean
- Budget: US$8.5 million
- Box office: US$57 million

Confidential Assignment (Korean: 공조) is a 2017 South Korean action comedy film directed by Kim Sung-hoon. It stars Hyun Bin, Yoo Hae-jin, and Kim Joo-hyuk. In the film, a North Korean officer and a Seoul detective team up to track down a dangerous fugitive, who is running a gang of counterfeiters.

== Plot ==
Im Cheol-ryung, an officer of a special investigation team in North Korea, barges into a warehouse that prints counterfeit money, where he learns that his superior Cha Ki-seong and his own team are there to steal the master plates to print the counterfeit money. A shootout ensues where Cheol-ryung's wife Hwa-ryung and his team are killed, while Cheol-ryung is gravely injured.

Meanwhile, the North Korean officials learn that Cha Ki-seong has fled to South Korea, where Cheol-ryung is ordered to capture Ki-seong and retrieve the stolen master plates, and is given only three days to complete his mission. However, South Korean officials suspect that Ki-seong is really a killer, and they assign Detective Kang Jin-tae from Seoul to watch over Cheol-ryung tightly as they suspect he intends to kill Ki-seong for revenge. Jin-tae meets Cheol-ryung at the airport, and they head for Myeong-Dong to check on one of Ki-seong's men, Park Myung-ho, but Cheol-ryong escapes after learning about Jin-tae's mission. Cheol-ryung arrives at Myeong-Dong to Jongro where Jin-tae also arrives there and interrogates Park, but the latter escapes. After the orders from his superior, Jin-tae takes Cheol-ryung to his home to spy on him.

Having guessed the Jin-tae's plan, Cheol-ryung removes the SIM card which Jin-tae had inserted in his phone to track his location anytime. The duo learns about the location where Park was supplying drugs and a fight ensues where Cheol-ryung takes the phone of one of the men and gives it to Jin-tae. Cheol-ryung learns Park's location after secretly bugging Jin-tae's phone. The duo heads to the restaurant where they find that Park is conversing with one of Ki-seong's comrades (who had been present at the warehouse). The comrade learns that Park plans to settle in South Korea, where he kills him under Ki-seong's orders. Cheol-ryung arrives and warns Ki-seong of his impending death, where he fights the comrade, who escapes. After checking Park's belongings, the officials learn about Cheol-ryung's mission.

Meanwhile, Jin-tae learns about Cheol-ryung's past and decide to help him. They reach the place where Ki-seong has arranged a deal to sell the plates, but Ki-seong kills the buyer when Cheol-ryung arrives and kills the henchmen where he is about Ki-seong, but Jin-tae stops him which gives time for Ki-seong to escape. Cheol-ryung takes the master plates and leaves. However, Ki-seong kidnaps Jin-tae's family and demands the plates. A frightened Jin-tae tells Cheol-ryung, where he takes the plates and heads to the location. Jin-tae and Cheol-ryung arrives and gives the plates to Ki-seong, who leaves Jin-tae's family where Jin-tae takes his family to a safe place. A battle ensues where Cheol-ryung and Jin-tae manages to kill Ki-seong. One year later, Cheol-ryung and Jin-tae receive their next mission.

== Cast ==
- Hyun Bin as Im Cheol-ryung
- Yoo Hae-jin as Kang Jin-tae
- Kim Joo-hyuk as Cha Ki-seong
- Jang Young-nam as Park So-yeon
- Im Yoon-ah as Park Min-young
- Lee Dong-hwi as Park Myung-ho
- Oh Eui-shik as Lee Dae-pal
- Kong Jung-hwan as Sung-kang
- Lee Hae-young as Detective squad chief Pyo
- Park Min-ha as Kang Yeon-ah
- Jun Gook-hwan as Won Hyung-sool
- Um Hyo-sup as Chairman Yoon
- Lee Yi-kyung as Lee Dong-hoon
- Shin Hyun-bin as Hwa-ryung
- Park Jin-woo as Jang Chil-bok
- Park Hyung-soo as NIS executive
- Kim Jun-han as NIS agent
- Eum Moon-suk as Troops #4

== Reception ==
Confidential Assignment opened in second place at the box office on January 18. It rose to first place in its second week selling an accumulative four million tickets by January 30 and surpassed the five million mark two days later.

The movie became the most viewed Korean movie during the first half of 2017 by attracting 7.8 million audience domestically. However, this record was surpassed in August by A Taxi Driver.

== International ==
Confidential Assignment was sold to 42 territories, including the U.S. and several countries in Asia.

- In US on January 27, 2017
- In Canada on February 3
- In Australia and New Zealand on February 9
- In Hong Kong and Macao on February 16
- In Taiwan on February 17
- In Vietnam on March 3
- In Thailand on April 13
- In India on November 25

== Awards and nominations ==
Year	Award	Category	Recipient	Result	Ref.
2017	53rd Baeksang Arts Awards	Best New Actress	Im Yoon-ah	Nominated	
2017	53rd Baeksang Arts Awards	Most Popular Actress	Im Yoon-ah	Won	
2017	Korean Film Shining Star Awards	Newcomer Award: Best New Actress	Im Yoon-ah	Won	
2017	Korean Film Shining Star Awards	Best Director	Kim Sung-hoon	Won	
2017	Fantasia International Film Festival	Action! Award	Confidential Assignment	Won	
2017	22nd Busan International Film Festival	Marie Claire Asia Star Awards: Rising Star Award	Im Yoon-ah	Won	
2017	1st The Seoul Awards	Best Supporting Actor	Kim Joo-hyuk	Won	
2017	1st The Seoul Awards	Most Popular Actress	Im Yoon-ah	Won	
2017	1st The Seoul Awards	Best New Actress	Im Yoon-ah	Nominated	
2017	54th Grand Bell Awards	Best New Actress	Im Yoon-ah	Nominated	
2017	38th Blue Dragon Film Awards	Best New Actress	Im Yoon-ah	Nominated	
2017	38th Blue Dragon Film Awards	Best Film Editing	Confidential Assignment	Nominated	
2017	1st Marianas International Film Festival in Saipan	Best Popular Asian Actress	Im Yoon-ah	Won	
2017	6th Korea Top Star Awards	Popular Star Award	Hyun Bin	Won	
2018	12th Asian Film Awards	Best Newcomer	Im Yoon-ah	Nominated	
2018	12th Asian Film Awards	AFA Next Generation Award	Im Yoon-ah	Won	
2018	13th University Film Festival of Korea	Best Actress Award	Im Yoon-ah	Won	

== Sequel ==
Confidential Assignment 2: International, a sequel was announced on August 24, 2020. Filming started on February 18, 2021 and was released on September 7, 2022.
