= Stars Academy season 1 =

Season of television series

Stars Academy
- Season 1
- Hosted by: Sammy Leung
- Coaches: AGA; Pakho Chau; Vincy Chan; JW; Gin Lee; Hacken Lee; Janice Vidal
- No. of contestants: 15
- Winner: Gigi Yim
- Runner-up: Chantel Yiu
- Opening theme: "Stars Academy" by all contestants
- No. of episodes: 14

Release
- Original network: TVB
- Original release: 10 April – 19 July 2021

Season chronology
- Next → Stars Academy 2

Stars Academy is a Hong Kong singing competition television series to find young singing talents. The first season premiered on 10 April 2021 and continued until 19 July 2021 for 14 episodes. Hosted by Sammy Leung, the show featured Hacken Lee as the coaching supervisor, along with AGA, Pakho Chau, Vincy Chan, JW, Gin Lee, and Janice Vidal as coaches. Throughout the competition, several performances gained popularity among the viewers, including Chantel Yiu's "Love Prediction" (戀愛預告), Gigi Yim's "Without You, I Still Love You" (沒有你還是愛你), and Yumi Chung's "Wild City" (狂野之城). The show was won by Gigi Yim. Following the finale, the contestants held a 4-day live concert titled First Live on Stage from 12 to 15 August 2021. The programme's popularity led TVB to continue its run for a second season (2022). It also inspired other TV shows, including the musical television series Forever Young at Heart (2021–2022) and the youth talent singing show Stars Junior Academy (2022).

== Production ==
Following their previous singing competition series, The Voice (2009–2015), TVB and its subsidiary TVB Music Group (formerly Voice Entertainment, referred to as such henceforth) intended to produce a new programme and opened applications in July 2020. The original concept of the show aimed to discover young talents in Cantopop and involved sending the contestants to different parts of the world for musical training. Due to the prolonged COVID-19 pandemic, TVB abandoned this plan and instead conducted the training domestically. In November 2020, fifteen contestants were introduced to the public through a group performance on TVB's 53rd Anniversary Gala show. In January 2021, "The First Call" promotional footage was released, showcasing the contestants' vocals in eight group and solo performances. These performances were also made available as digital singles on various music streaming platforms.

Originally planned for February or March 2021, the competition faced a delay due to a management shake-up at Voice Entertainment, finally commencing in April 2021. In early April, additional promotional footage titled "Prequel" introduced actor Sammy Leung as the host and singer Hacken Lee as the coaching supervisor. Musician Johnny Yim joined the team as the music director. The show's eponymous theme song was then digitally released on 9 April 2021, accompanied by a music video featuring all the contestants. The first episode was broadcast on 10 April 2021. The show used XR technology to create a unique stage effect—the first in TVB's broadcasting history. A complemental TV programme titled Starry Starry Academy aired concurrently, featuring commentary, behind-the-scenes footage, and interviews.

== Format and competition overview ==
Coaches of Stars Academy
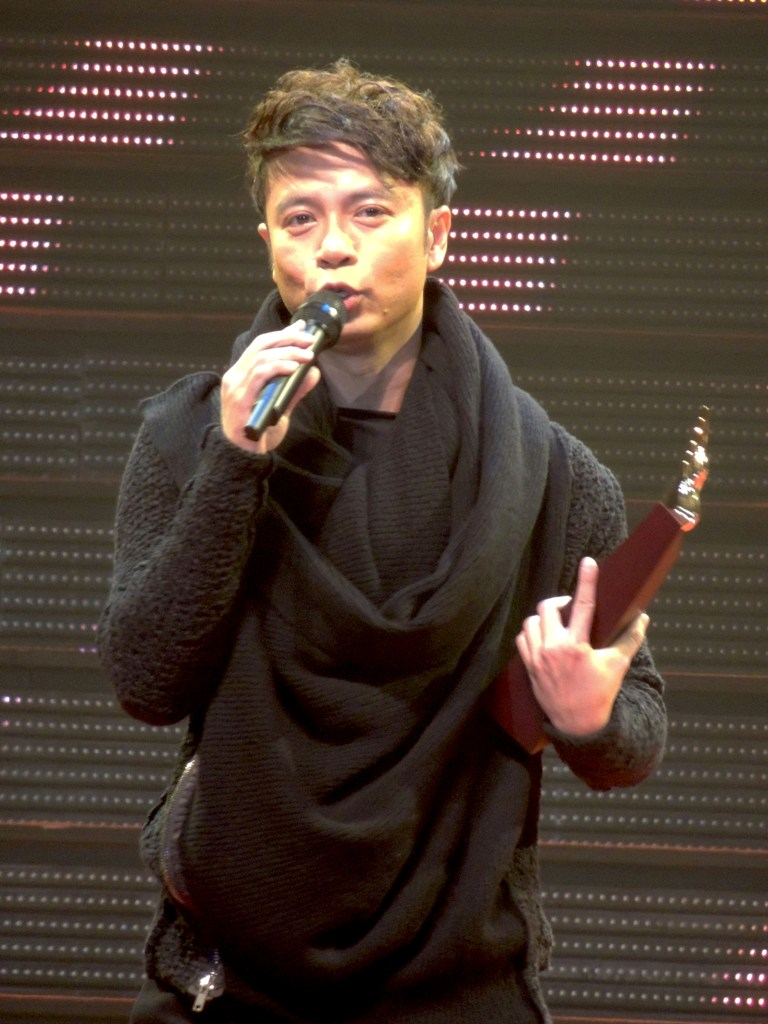
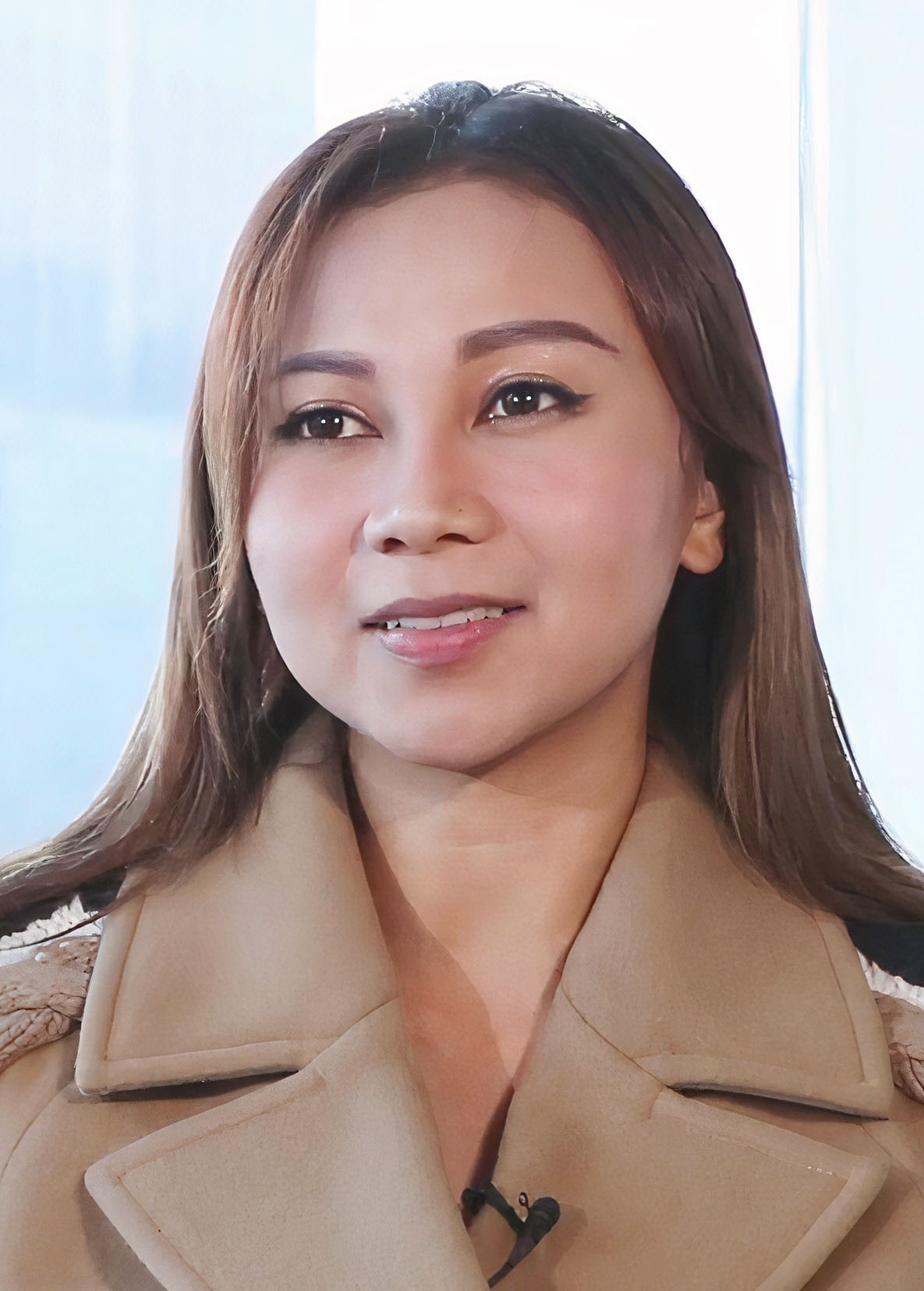
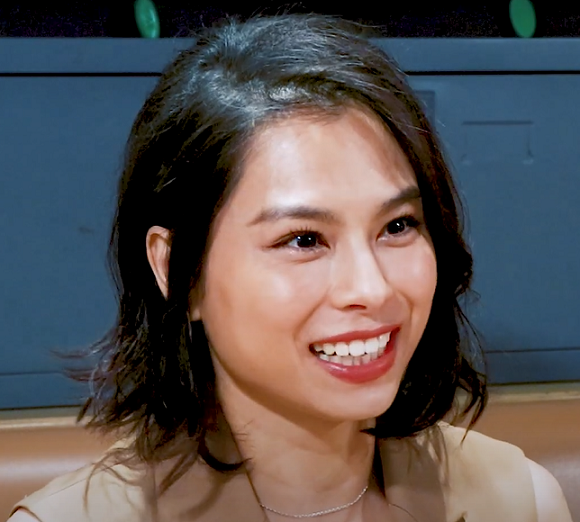
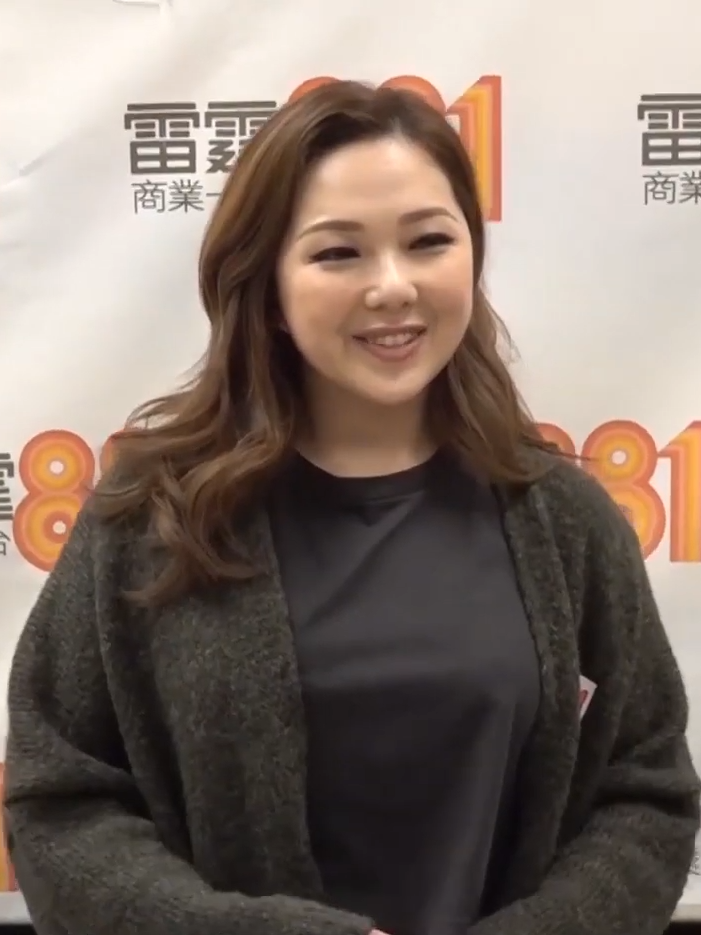
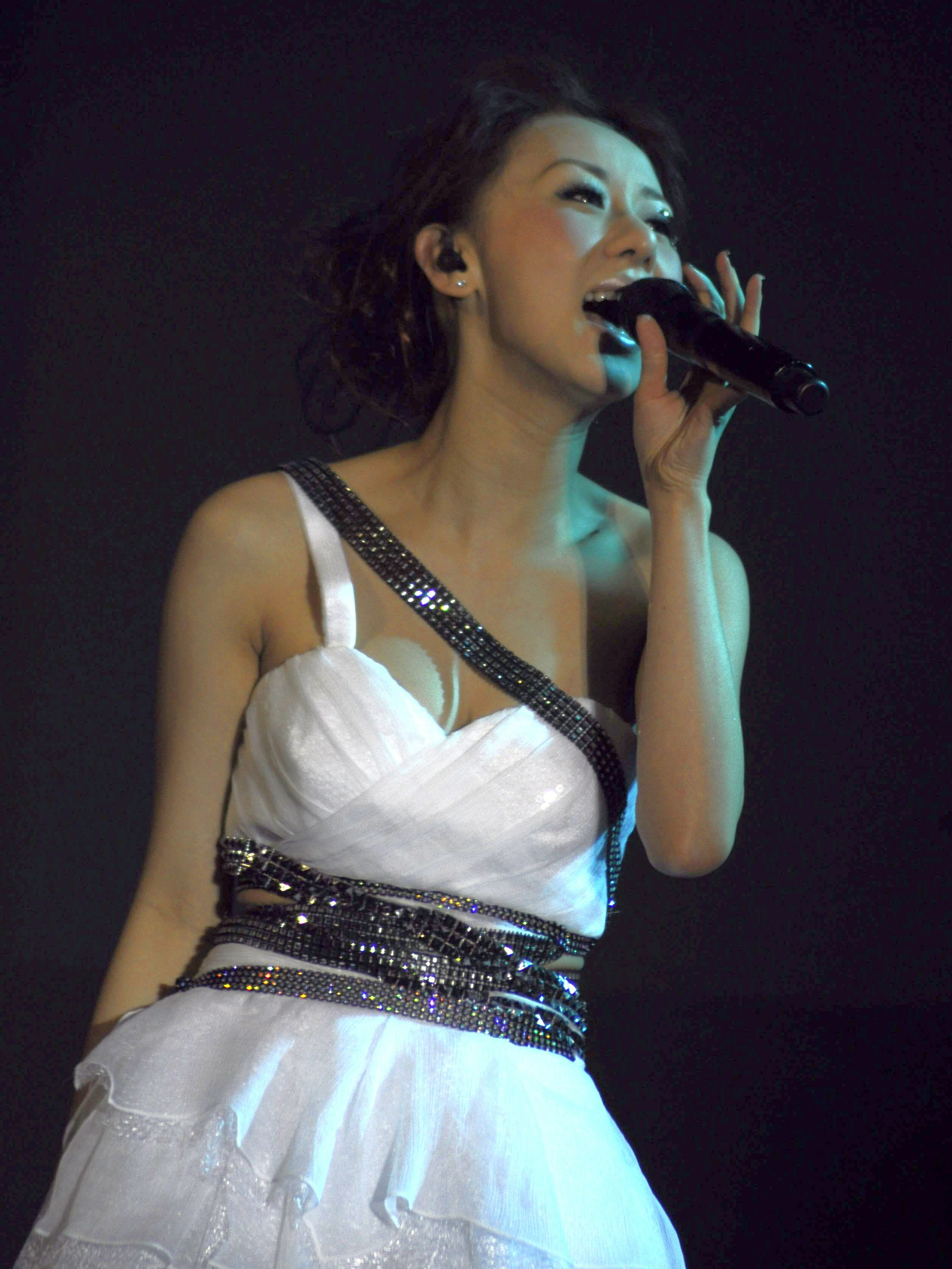
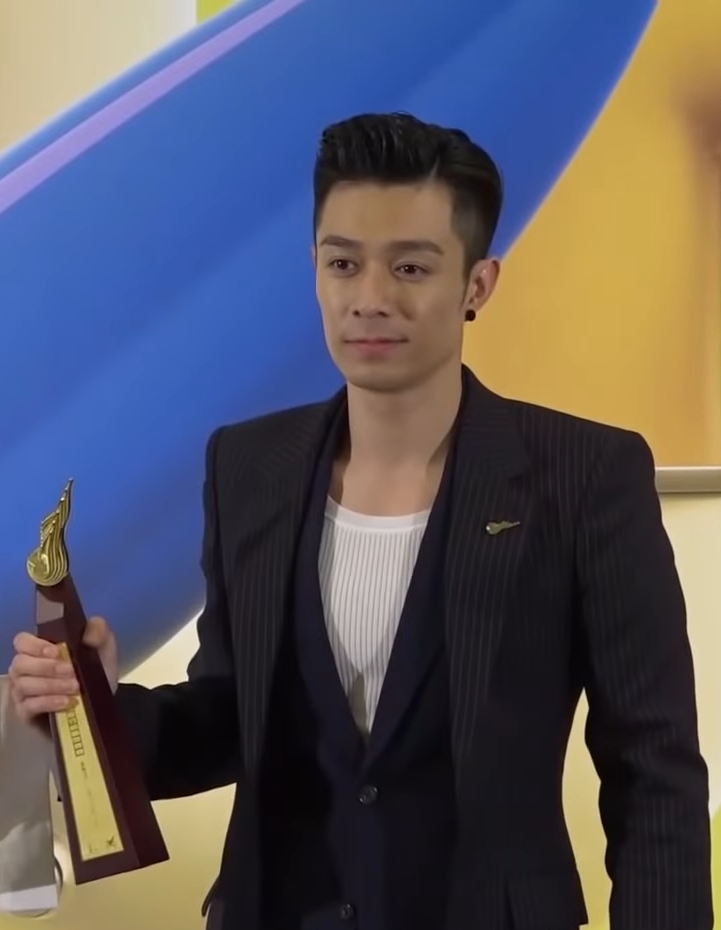
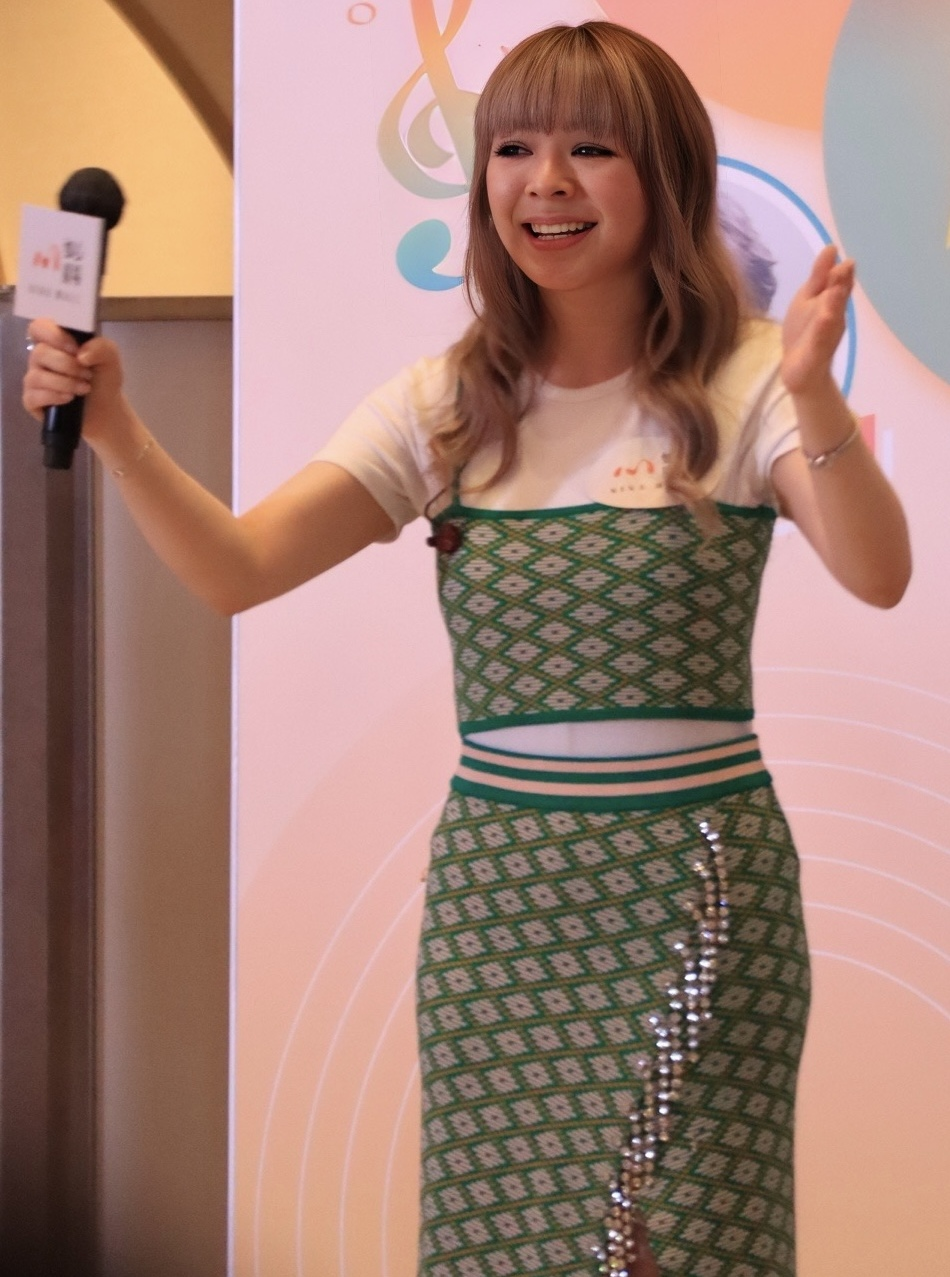
L–R, top: Hacken Lee (coaching supervisor), AGA, Gin Lee, Janice Vidal
L–R, bottom: Vincy Chan, Pakho Chau, JW

The fifteen contestants performed individually or in groups in a series of rounds. Except for the live finale, the competition was pre-recorded. Depending on the length, each round was broadcast within one or two episodes. The show employed a panel of 25 professional music judges in each round to critique and score the contestants.

The competition kicked-off in Episodes 1–2 with individual performances from all the contestants. One contestant was eliminated, leaving fourteen to continue. These fourteen contestants were then divided into two teams, seven apiece, named as the Red and Blue teams.

In the following four rounds (Episodes 3–9), the Red and Blue teams competed against each other under the guidance of their respective coaches. With Hacken Lee as the coaching supervisor, the Red Team was led by Vincy Chan, Pakho Chau, and JW. The Blue team was led by AGA, Gin Lee, and Janice Vidal. The losing team's coaches would eliminate one to three contestants per round, as stipulated by the rules. Episodes 3–4 featured individual head-to-head battles, and the team with the higher overall score would win. In Episodes 5–6, the teams competed in five matches, with designated lead vocalists in the first three and collaborative performances involving the full team and coaches in the latter two. The team with the most wins would be the winner. Episode 7 featured three team battles competing for a cumulative score. Episodes 8–9 featured a 1980s–2000s Cantopop Golden Hits theme. Under guest host Alan Tam's guidance, the teams engaged in another series of one-on-one battles, competing for the higher number of match wins.

In the next four rounds (Episodes 10–14), the competition returned to an individual format. Episodes 10–11 introduced guest coaches Mag Lam, Phil Lam, and Jay Fung, joining the permanent ones. Each contestant performed a duet with a chosen coach, resulting in the elimination of one contestant in each episode. Episode 12 eliminated another contestant. During this time, Hacken Lee departed from his coaching role due to his commitment to Sing! China. In Episode 13, Hins Cheung appeared as a guest coach. The six remaining contestants were paired up based on judges' preferences to perform duets, with the higher-scoring contestant from each pair advancing to the top five. The highest scorer among the remaining contestants also advanced, while the bottom two battled in an elimination round, each performing another duet with Cheung, and the one with the lower score being eliminated. The finale (Episode 14) took place on 19 July 2021 and featured the top five finalists. Unlike previous rounds, the finale incorporated both judges' scores and audience votes to determine the winner. Gigi Yim and Chantel Yiu became the top two and competed in a final round. Ultimately, Gigi Yim won three awards: Judges' Choice, Viewers' Choice, and Overall Championship, along with a HKD $100,000 prize.

== Contestants ==
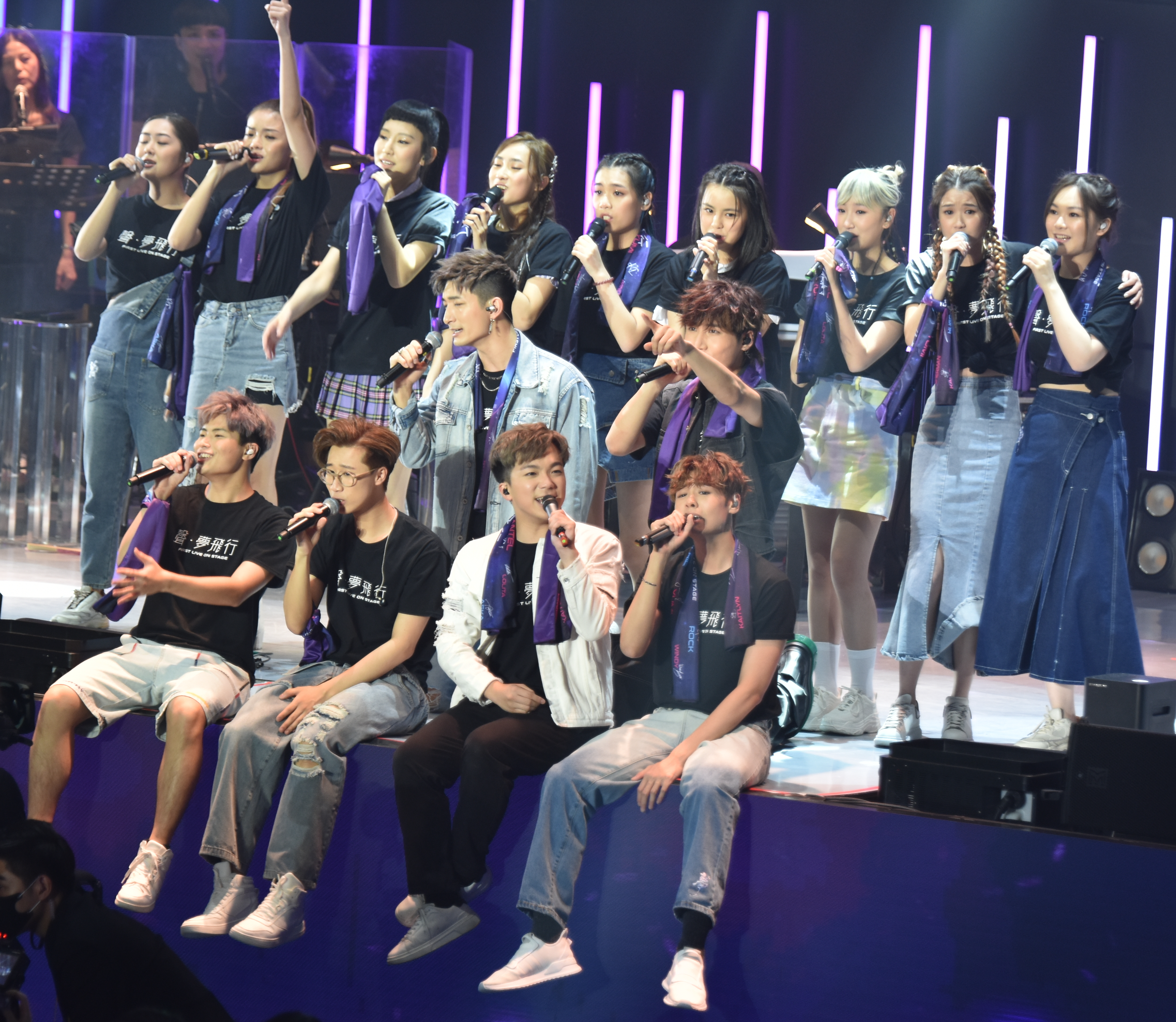
Back – Venus Lam, Aeren Man, Gigi Yim, Yumi Chung, Kaitlyn Lam, Chantel Yiu, Windy Zhan, Sherman Poon, Lolita Tsoi Middle – Aska Cheung, Hugo Wong Front – Steven Suen, Felix Lam, Rock Ho, Archie Sin

- Gigi Yim Ming-hay (Note: Chinese: 炎明熹; Jyutping: Jim^{4} Ming^{4}-hei^{1}) (age 16 on the show) was considered to have the most standout vocals on the show. Her rendition of Sandy Lam's "Without You, I Still Love You" (沒有你還是愛你) was the first performance that gained widespread popularity.
- Chantel Yiu Cheuk-faye (Note: Chinese: 姚焯菲; Jyutping: Jiu^{4} Coek^{3}-fei^{1}) (age 14 on the show) was recognized for her innate musical talent despite not being the most technically skilled contestant. Her rendition of Danny Chan's "Love Prediction" (戀愛預告) became the most-viewed performance, eventually ranking as top six local YouTube videos of the year. One of the judges, musician Harry Ng, commented on being greatly impressed by her storytelling ability in this performance.
- Yumi Chung Yau-mei (Note: Chinese: 鍾柔美; Jyutping: Zung^{1} Jau^{4}-mei^{5}) (age 14 on the show) is most known for her dancing ability, highlighted in her performances, including her rendition of Aaron Kwok's "Wild City" (狂野之城).
- Archie Sin Ching-fung (Note: Chinese: 冼靖峰; Jyutping: Sin^{2} Zing^{6}-fung^{1}) (age 22 on the show) impressed Eric Kwok, a music producer and judge on the show, with his performance of Eason Chan's "The Night No Longer Comes" (黑夜不再來). Kwok complimented him for making the rendition "his own". Sin and fellow contestant Aska Cheung co-wrote the original song "Puzzle" (拼圖), which Red Team contestants performed in the competition.
- Rock Ho Chun-lok (Note: Chinese: 何晉樂; Jyutping: Ho^{4} Zeon^{3}-lok^{6}) (age 24 on the show) was praised for delivering a "heartfelt interpretation" of Danny Chan's "Wait" (等).
- Aeren Man Hoi-ting (Note: Chinese: 文凱婷; Jyutping: Man^{4} Hoi^{2}-ting^{4}) (age 20 on the show)
- Kaitlyn Lam Kwan-lin (Note: Chinese: 林君蓮; Jyutping: Lam^{4} Gwan^{1}-lin^{4}) (age 18 on the show)
- Hugo Wong Yik-bun (Note: Chinese: 黃奕斌; Jyutping: Wong^{4} Jik^{6}-ban^{1}) (age 21 on the show)
- Felix Lam Chi-lok (Note: Chinese: 林智樂; Jyutping: Lam^{4} Zi^{3}-lok^{6}) (age 17 on the show) was noted for having a distinctive voice timbre.
- Windy Zhan Tian-wen (Note: Chinese: 詹天文; Jyutping: Zim^{1} Tin^{1}-man^{4}) (age 15 on the show) was noted for her high-pitched vocals. Notable performance including her rendition of G.E.M.'s "Bubble", and "Bang Bang" by Jessie J, Ariana Grande, and Nicki Minaj. She also performed Sandy Lam's "Without You, I Still Love You" (沒有你還是愛你) as a counterpart to Gigi Yim who also performed that song in a same episode of the show.
- Sherman Poon Ching-man (Note: Chinese: 潘靜文; Jyutping: Pun^{1} Zing^{6}-man^{4}) (age 23 on the show)
- Aska Cheung Chi-ho (Note: Chinese: 張馳豪; Jyutping: Zoeng^{1} Ci^{4}-hou^{4}) (age 26 on the show) and fellow contestant Archie Sin co-wrote the original song "Puzzle" (拼圖), which Red Team contestants performed in the competition.
- Steven Suen Hon-lam (Note: Chinese: 孫漢霖; Jyutping: Syun^{1} Hon^{3}-lam^{4}) (age 22 on the show)
- Venus Lam Chi-ngai (Note: Chinese: 林沚羿; Jyutping: Lam^{4} Zi^{2}-ngai^{6}) (age 21 on the show)
- Lolita Tsoi Hoi-wing (Note: Chinese: 蔡愷穎; Jyutping: Coi^{3} Hoi^{2}-wing^{6}) (age 18 on the show)

== Episode performances ==
* Song titles are loosely translated into English for better readability. Official Chinese song titles are indicated in parentheses.

Color key:

Red team contestant	Blue team contestant
This contestant advanced to next round.	This contestant was eliminated.
This contestant was in the top two.	This contestant was in the bottom two.
This contestant won Stars Academy.	This contestant was the runner-up.

=== Episodes 1–2 ===
Order	Contestant	Song	Score	Result	Ref.
1	Yumi Chung	"Skylight" (天窗) by Joey Yung	15	Advanced	
2	Aska Cheung	"Your Name Engraved Herein" (刻在我心底的名字) by Crowd Lu	16	Advanced	
3	Chantel Yiu	"Final Boarding Call" (在月台上等你) by Janice Vidal	9	Advanced	
4	Felix Lam	"No Other Replacement in This World" (天下無雙) by Eason Chan	13	Advanced	
5	Windy Zhan	"Bubble" (泡沫) by G.E.M.	24	Advanced	
6	Rock Ho	"Worse Comes to Worst" (壞與更壞) by Yoga Lin	22	Advanced	
7	Sherman Poon	"You Are Your Own Legend" (你是你本身的傳奇) by Charmaine Fong	8	Advanced	
8	Archie Sin	"Beneath the Cherry Blossom Tree" (櫻花樹下) by Hins Cheung	14	Advanced	
9	Gigi Yim	"Unbreakable Love" (永不失聯的愛) by Eric Chou	19	Advanced	
10	Hugo Wong	"My Vow" (我的宣言) by Pakho Chau	13	Advanced	
11	Aeren Man	"Wooden Grain" (木紋) by Denise Ho	5	Advanced	
12	Kaitlyn Lam	"True or False" (世事何曾是絕對) by Lowell Lo	22	Advanced	
13	Steven Suen	"Special Person" (特別的人) by Khalil Fong	20	Advanced	
14	Venus Lam	"I Ain't Got You" (如果沒有你) by Karen Mok	15	Advanced	
15	Lolita Tsoi	"Science of the Heart" (心之科學) by Joey Yung	4	Eliminated	

=== Episodes 3–4: First team battles ===
Order	Contestant	Song	Score (Note: Red team won with a cumulative score 97–78.)	Ref.
1	Gigi Yim	"Snowflower" (花無雪) by Vincy Chan	12	
1	Archie Sin	"Song of Happiness" (幸福之歌) by Supper Moment	13	
2	Sherman Poon	"Perseverance" (忍) by Mag Lam	14	
2	Steven Suen	"Full Moon Party" by Jay Fung	11	
3	Felix Lam	"Mailman" (郵差) by Faye Wong	7	
3	Chantel Yiu	"Escape Door" (逃生門) by JW	18	
4	Windy Zhan	"Suffering" (煎熬) by Jess Lee	10	
4	Aeren Man	"Superman" by AGA	15	
5	Kaitlyn Lam	"Parabola" (拋物線) by Tanya Chua	21	
5	Aska Cheung	"Love You Too Much" (只是太愛你) by Hins Cheung	4	
6	Hugo Wong	"Little White" (小白) by Pakho Chau	16	
6	Venus Lam	"Be Keen on You" (喜歡你) by Beyond	9	
7	Yumi Chung	"Goddess" (女神) by Joyce Cheng	3	
7	Rock Ho	"The Book of Laughter and Forgetting" (笑忘書) by Hins Cheung	22	

Team formation and result
Red team		Blue team	
Aska Cheung	Advanced	Yumi Chung	Advanced
Rock Ho	Advanced	Felix Lam	Advanced
Sherman Poon	Advanced	Kaitlyn Lam	Advanced
Archie Sin	Advanced	Venus Lam	Eliminated
Hugo Wong	Advanced	Aeren Man	Advanced
Chantel Yiu	Advanced	Steven Suen	Advanced
Windy Zhan	Advanced	Gigi Yim	Advanced

=== Episodes 5–6: Second team battles ===
Order	Contestant(s)	Song	Score (Note: Red team won the round 3–2 in matches.)	Ref.
1	Yumi Chung, Kaitlyn Lam, Aeren Man, Gigi Yim	"How You Like That" by Blackpink	7	
1	Aska Cheung, Archie Sin	"Colour of Your Eyes" (眼色) by Yoga Lin	18	
2	Kaitlyn Lam	"Light Years Away" (光年之外) by G.E.M.	3	
2	Windy Zhan	"Bang Bang" by Jessie J, Ariana Grande and Nicki Minaj	22	
3	Felix Lam, Steven Suen, Gigi Yim	"Onion" (洋蔥) by Aska Yang	22	
3	Sherman Poon, Hugo Wong, Chantel Yiu	"Born Second Grade" (天生二品) by Jace Chan	3	
4	Yumi Chung, Felix Lam, Kaitlyn Lam, Aeren Man, Steven Suen, Gigi Yim	"Lydia" by F.I.R.	2	
4	Aska Cheung, Rock Ho, Sherman Poon, Archie Sin, Hugo Wong, Chantel Yiu, Windy Zhan	"Puzzle" (拼圖) Original song	23	
5	Rock Ho, Vincy Chan (coach), JW (coach)	"Servant of Love" (裙下之臣) by Eason Chan	1	
5	Gigi Yim, Janice Vidal (coach)	"Million Reasons" by Lady Gaga	24	

Team formation and result
Red team		Blue team	
Aska Cheung	Advanced	Yumi Chung	Advanced
Rock Ho	Advanced	Felix Lam	Advanced
Sherman Poon	Advanced	Kaitlyn Lam	Advanced
Archie Sin	Advanced	Aeren Man	Advanced
Hugo Wong	Advanced	Steven Suen	Eliminated
Chantel Yiu	Advanced	Gigi Yim	Advanced
Windy Zhan	Advanced		

=== Episode 7: Third team battles ===
Order	Contestant(s)	Song	Score (Note: Blue team won with a cumulative score 66–9.)	Ref.
1	Aska Cheung, Rock Ho, Sherman Poon, Archie Sin, Chantel Yiu	"Bicycle" (單車) by Eason Chan	3	
1	Felix Lam, Kaitlyn Lam	"Half Moon Serenade" (月半小夜曲) by Hacken Lee	22	
2	Hugo Wong	"The Last One" (煞科) by Sammi Cheng	4	
2	Yumi Chung, Aeren Man	"Dancing Street" (跳舞街) by Priscilla Chan	21	
3	Windy Zhan	"Without You, I Still Love You" (沒有你還是愛你) by Sandy Lam	2	
3	Gigi Yim	"Without You, I Still Love You" (沒有你還是愛你) by Sandy Lam	23	

Team formation and result
Red team		Blue team	
Aska Cheung	Eliminated	Yumi Chung	Advanced
Rock Ho	Advanced	Felix Lam	Advanced
Sherman Poon	Eliminated	Kaitlyn Lam	Advanced
Archie Sin	Advanced	Aeren Man	Advanced
Hugo Wong	Advanced	Gigi Yim	Advanced
Chantel Yiu	Advanced		
Windy Zhan	Advanced		

=== Episodes 8–9: Fourth team battles ===
Order	Contestant	Song	Score (Note: Blue team won the round 3–2 in matches.)	Ref.
1	Yumi Chung	"Impatient Beings" (心急人上) by Cookies	19	
1	Hugo Wong	"Side Face" (側面) by Leslie Cheung	6	
2	Kaitlyn Lam	"Embraced by the Starlight" (繾綣星光下) by Shirley Kwan	22	
2	Windy Zhan	"I Must Leave" (非走不可) by Cass Phang	3	
3	Chantel Yiu	"Love Prediction" (戀愛預告) by Sandy Lamb	19	
3	Aeren Man	"Don't Know" (未知) by Joey Yung	6	
4	Felix Lam	"Impression" (印象) by Sam Hui	4	
4	Archie Sin	"The Night No Longer Comes" (黑夜不再來) by Eason Chan	21	
5	Gigi Yim	"Love Trap" (愛情陷阱) by Alan Tam	16	
5	Rock Ho	"Wait" (等) by Danny Chan	9	

Team formation and result
Red team		Blue team	
Rock Ho	Advanced	Yumi Chung	Advanced
Archie Sin	Advanced	Felix Lam	Advanced
Hugo Wong	Advanced	Kaitlyn Lam	Advanced
Chantel Yiu	Advanced	Aeren Man	Advanced
Windy Zhan	Eliminated	Gigi Yim	Advanced

=== Episodes 10–11 ===
Order	Contestant with a coach of choice	Duet song	Score (Note: Rock Ho and Hugo Wong had the same score, which prompted the judges to make a knock-out vote. The result was 13–12 in favor of Rock Ho.)	Result	Ref.
1	Felix Lam, Phil Lam	"Breaking Up On a Rainy Day" (分手總要在雨天) by Jacky Cheung	11	Eliminated	
2	Kaitlyn Lam, Vincy Chan	"Love Commandments" (情誡) by Faye Wong	17	Advanced	
3	Archie Sin, Jay Fung	"Rustle of Rain" (沙沙的雨) by David Lui	23	Advanced	
4	Aeren Man, Mag Lam	"Love Is Full of Doubt" (愛是懷疑) by Eason Chan	13	Advanced	
5	Gigi Yim, AGA	"Hard Life" (命硬) by Justin Lo	23	Advanced	
6	Rock Ho, Gin Lee	"The Dark Day" (天黑黑) by Stefanie Sun	11 (13)	Advanced	
7	Hugo Wong, Pakho Chau	"Willing To Replace You" (甘心替代你) by Ekin Cheng	11 (12)	Eliminated	
8	Chantel Yiu, JW	"A Life of Contradictions" (矛盾一生) by JW	18	Advanced	
9	Yumi Chung, Janice Vidal	"Even If the World's No Fairy Tales" (就算世界無童話) by Janice Vidal	20	Advanced	

=== Episode 12 ===
Order	Contestant	Song	Score	Result	Ref.
1	Archie Sin	"Late Person" (昨遲人) by Andy Hui	18	Advanced	
2	Kaitlyn Lam	"If I Don't Have You" (如果沒有你) by Karen Mok	7	Eliminated	
3	Aeren Man	"Bad Boy" by A-Mei	9	Advanced	
4	Chantel Yiu	"In Love Again" (我這樣愛你) by Leon Lai	23	Advanced	
5	Gigi Yim	"The Goodbye Kiss" (吻別) by Jacky Cheung	18	Advanced	
6	Yumi Chung	"Wild City" (狂野之城) by Aaron Kwok	20	Advanced	
7	Rock Ho	"I Can't Sing" (我不會唱歌) by Hacken Lee	24	Advanced	

=== Episode 13 ===
Order	Contestant	Duet song	Score	Result	Ref.
1	Gigi Yim	"Encounter" (遇見) by Stefanie Sun	11	Bottom two	
1	Chantel Yiu	"Encounter" (遇見) by Stefanie Sun	14	Advanced	
2	Aeren Man	"All Summer Holiday" (全身暑假) by Joey Yung	2	Bottom two	
2	Yumi Chung	"All Summer Holiday" (全身暑假) by Joey Yung	23	Advanced	
3	Rock Ho	"How Could I Not Regret Having Let You Go" (怎麼捨得你) by Jacky Cheung	12	Advanced	
3	Archie Sin	"How Could I Not Regret Having Let You Go" (怎麼捨得你) by Jacky Cheung	13	Advanced	
Elimination round
4	Aeren Man, Hins Cheung (coach)	"At Least I've Got You" (至少還有你) by Sandy Lam	0	Eliminated	
4	Gigi Yim, Hins Cheung (coach)	"Gossip" (流言) by Vivian Chow and Kevin Lin	25	Advanced	

=== Episode 14: Finale ===
Order	Contestant	Song	Score (Note: The outcome of the first round was determined by combining the judges' scores with the audience votes. In the second round, the judges' scores alone determined the result.)	Result	Ref.
1	Yumi Chung	"The Fourth Night's Mood" (第四晚心情) by Aaron Kwok	18.9%	Third place	
2	Archie Sin	"What I Miss" (我懷念的) by Stefanie Sun	17.6%	Fourth place	
3	Chantel Yiu	"I Love You" (愛很簡單) by David Tao	25.0%	Top two	
4	Rock Ho	"Slip Out" (衝口而出) by Eason Chan	5.3%	Fifth place	
5	Gigi Yim	"Understanding" (領悟) by Winnie Hsin	33.0%	Top two	
Second round
6	Chantel Yiu	"Chotto" (Chotto等等) by Sammi Cheng	3	Runner-up	
7	Gigi Yim	"Bad Romance" by Lady Gaga	22	Winner	

== Elimination chart ==
Color key:

Winner	Runner-up
Advanced as an individual contestant	Advanced as part of the Red team	Advanced as part of the Blue team
Eliminated as an individual contestant	Eliminated as part of the Red team	Eliminated as part of the Blue team

Contestant	Episode 1–2	Episode 3–4	Episode 5–6	Episode 7	Episode 8–9	Episode 10–11	Episode 12	Episode 13	Finale
Gigi Yim	Advanced	Advanced	Advanced	Advanced	Advanced	Advanced	Advanced	Advanced	Winner
Chantel Yiu	Advanced	Advanced	Advanced	Advanced	Advanced	Advanced	Advanced	Advanced	Runner-up
Yumi Chung	Advanced	Advanced	Advanced	Advanced	Advanced	Advanced	Advanced	Advanced	Eliminated
Archie Sin	Advanced	Advanced	Advanced	Advanced	Advanced	Advanced	Advanced	Advanced	Eliminated
Rock Ho	Advanced	Advanced	Advanced	Advanced	Advanced	Advanced	Advanced	Advanced	Eliminated
Aeren Man	Advanced	Advanced	Advanced	Advanced	Advanced	Advanced	Advanced	Eliminated	
Kaitlyn Lam	Advanced	Advanced	Advanced	Advanced	Advanced	Advanced	Eliminated		
Hugo Wong	Advanced	Advanced	Advanced	Advanced	Advanced	Eliminated			
Felix Lam	Advanced	Advanced	Advanced	Advanced	Advanced	Eliminated			
Windy Zhan	Advanced	Advanced	Advanced	Advanced	Eliminated				
Sherman Poon	Advanced	Advanced	Advanced	Eliminated					
Aska Cheung	Advanced	Advanced	Advanced	Eliminated					
Steven Suen	Advanced	Advanced	Eliminated						
Venus Lam	Advanced	Eliminated							
Lolita Tsoi	Eliminated								

== Reception and ratings ==
As of September 2021, Chantel Yiu's performance of "Love Prediction" (戀愛預告) has accumulated 4.08 million views on YouTube, making it the most-watched performance. Following closely behind are Gigi Yim's rendition of "Without You, I Still Love You" (沒有你還是愛你) with 2.3 million views, and Yumi Chung's performance of "Wild City" (狂野之城) with 2.18 million views, ranking as the second and third most-viewed performances, respectively. Yiu, Yim, and Chung also received significant media coverage and were considered popular among the viewers, contributing to the overall success of the show. The finale had an average viewership of 1.57 million, reaching a peak of 1.63 million viewers.

Danny Chan, the late songwriter of "Love Prediction" (戀愛預告, 1984)―the classic became widely popular again after contestant Chantel Yiu performed it on Episode 8 of the show.

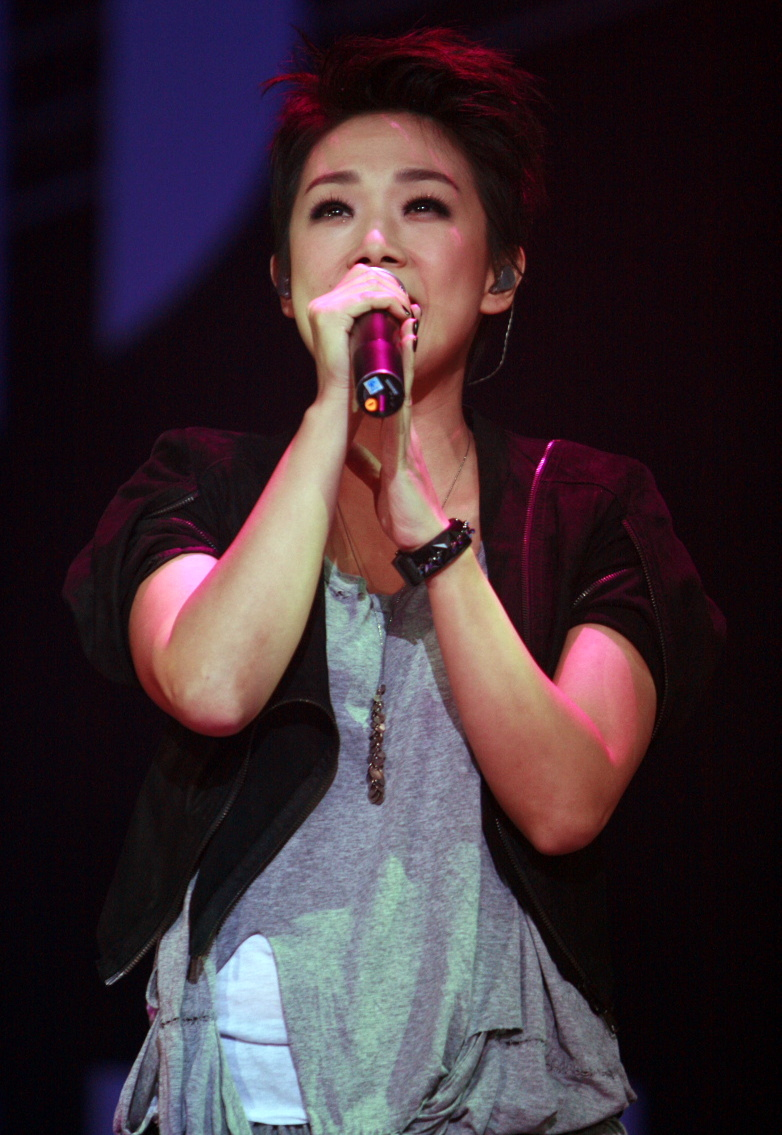
Sandy Lam, the original artist of "Without You, I Still Love You" (沒有你還是愛你, 1991)

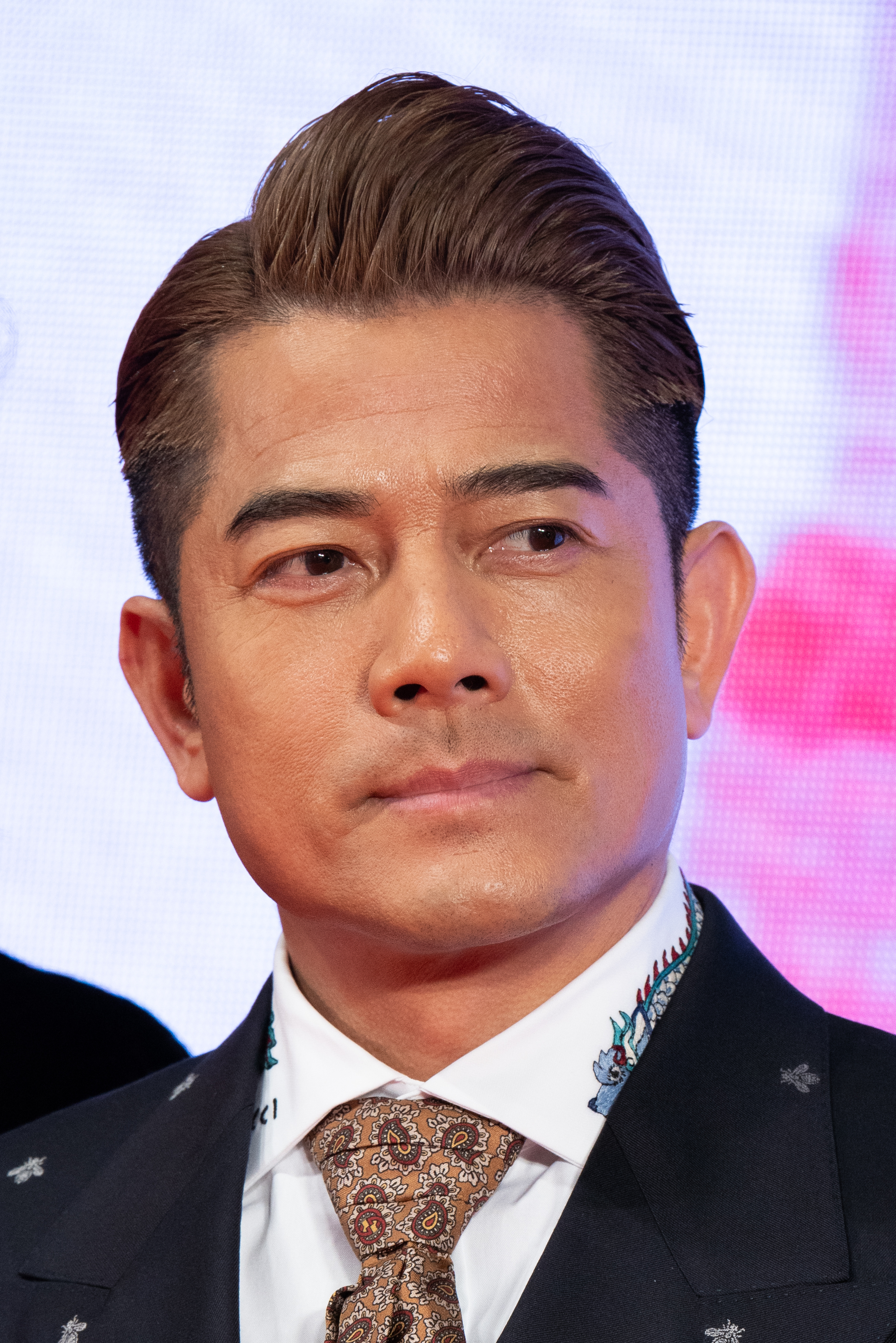
Aaron Kwok, the original artist of "Wild City" (狂野之城, 1994)

Episode	Airing date	Viewership rating (Note: According to Hong Kong's Nielsen TV ratings system, each rating point represents about 64,200 viewers.)		Ref.
Episode	Airing date	Hong Kong	Macau	Ref.
First Call	3 January 2021	14 points	8.3 points	
Prequel	4 April 2021	17.3 points	10.6 points	
1	10 April 2021	19 points	13.9 points	
2	17 April 2021	16.9 points	11.7 points	
3	24 April 2021	17.2 points	12.2 points	
4	1 May 2021	16.3 points	10.7 points	
5	8 May 2021	16.3 points	11.3 points	
6	15 May 2021	N.A.	N.A.	
7	22 May 2021	N.A.	N.A.	
8	5 June 2021	16.1 points	N.A.	
9	12 June 2021	17.1 points	N.A.	
10	19 June 2021	16.6 points	N.A.	
11	26 June 2021	17 points	N.A.	
12	3 July 2021	17.1 points	N.A.	
13	17 July 2021	18.2 points	N.A.	
14 (Finale)	19 July 2021	23.9 points	N.A.	
Finale Special	19 July 2021	17.1 points	N.A.	
First Live on Stage (concert)	28 August 2021	13.3 points	N.A.	

== Post–competition ==
Alongside a management contract with TVB, the contestants also signed a record deal with Voice Entertainment. In October 2021, a dedicated sublabel, All About Music, was established under Voice Entertainment to handle the release of their musical works. The top five finalists—Gigi Yim, Chantel Yiu, Yumi Chung, Archie Sin, and Rock Ho—were among the first artists to launch their solo careers under the label. (Note: Gigi Yim released her debut song with Voice Entertainment in September 2021. At the establishment of All About Music, she joined the sublabel for about a year before returning to what is now known as TVB Music Group.) In addition to the solo endeavors, All About Music also formed a girl group called After Class which included Gigi Yim, Windy Zhan, Chantel Yiu, and Yumi Chung. The contestants made their acting debut starring in the musical television series Forever Young at Heart (2021–2022). In September 2025, Gigi Yim left TVB management and established her own studio to oversee her future work.

== Concerts ==
First Live on Stage was a live concert featuring the fifteen contestants, with the music coaches making special appearances as guest performers. Originally planned for two dates, Voice Entertainment added two more dates to accommodate the overwhelming popularity. The concert ran from 12 to 15 August 2021 at MacPherson Stadium, featuring a setlist primarily consisted of songs performed by the contestants during the singing competition. A televised version of the concert was broadcast on 28 August 2021.

The contestants reunited two years later for What We Become Live, a concert that took place on 22 December 2023, at Kowloonbay International Trade & Exhibition Centre. The show was said to experience lower-than-expected ticket sales and received criticism for its disappointing setlist.

== Releases ==
=== The First Call ===
- Gigi Yim – "Guarding the Wheatfield" (守望麥田 by Faye Wong)
- Chantel Yiu, Windy Zhan and Yumi Chung – "The End" (到此為止 by Shiga Lin)
- Rock Ho and Sherman Poon – "Lost for Words" (欲言又止 by Vincent Wong and Hana Kuk}
- Archie Sin and Felix Lam – "Snowflakes" (飛花 by Hacken Lee)
- Aska Cheung and Kaitlyn Lam – "A Kind of Sorrows" (有一種悲傷 by A-Lin)
- Steven Suen – "Missing" (太難開始 by Hubert Wu)
- Venus Lam, Lolita Tsoi and Aeren Man – "What I Miss" (我懷念的 by Stefanie Sun)
- Hugo Wong – "Dawn of Us" (by Jackson Wang)

=== Original songs ===
- Group – "Stars Academy" (造夢時學會飛行, 2021) – Stars Academy theme song
- Group – "Go Go Gold" (奪金, 2021) – TVB's 2020 Summer Olympics theme song
- Group – "Hat Trick" (2022) – featuring the second season contestants
- Group — "Puzzle" (拼圖, 2023)

== Awards and nominations ==
Year	Award	Category	Nominated work	Result	Ref.
2021	54th TVB Anniversary Awards	Best Variety Show	Stars Academy	Won	
2021	54th TVB Anniversary Awards	Best TV Themesong	"Stars Academy"	Won	
2021	54th TVB Anniversary Awards	Best TV Host	Sammy Leung	Nominated	
2022	New York Festivals TV & Film Awards	Entertainment Programme Promotion (bronze)	Stars Academy	Won	
