= JW (Hong Kong singer) =

Hong Kong singer and actress (born 1990)

- 王灝兒
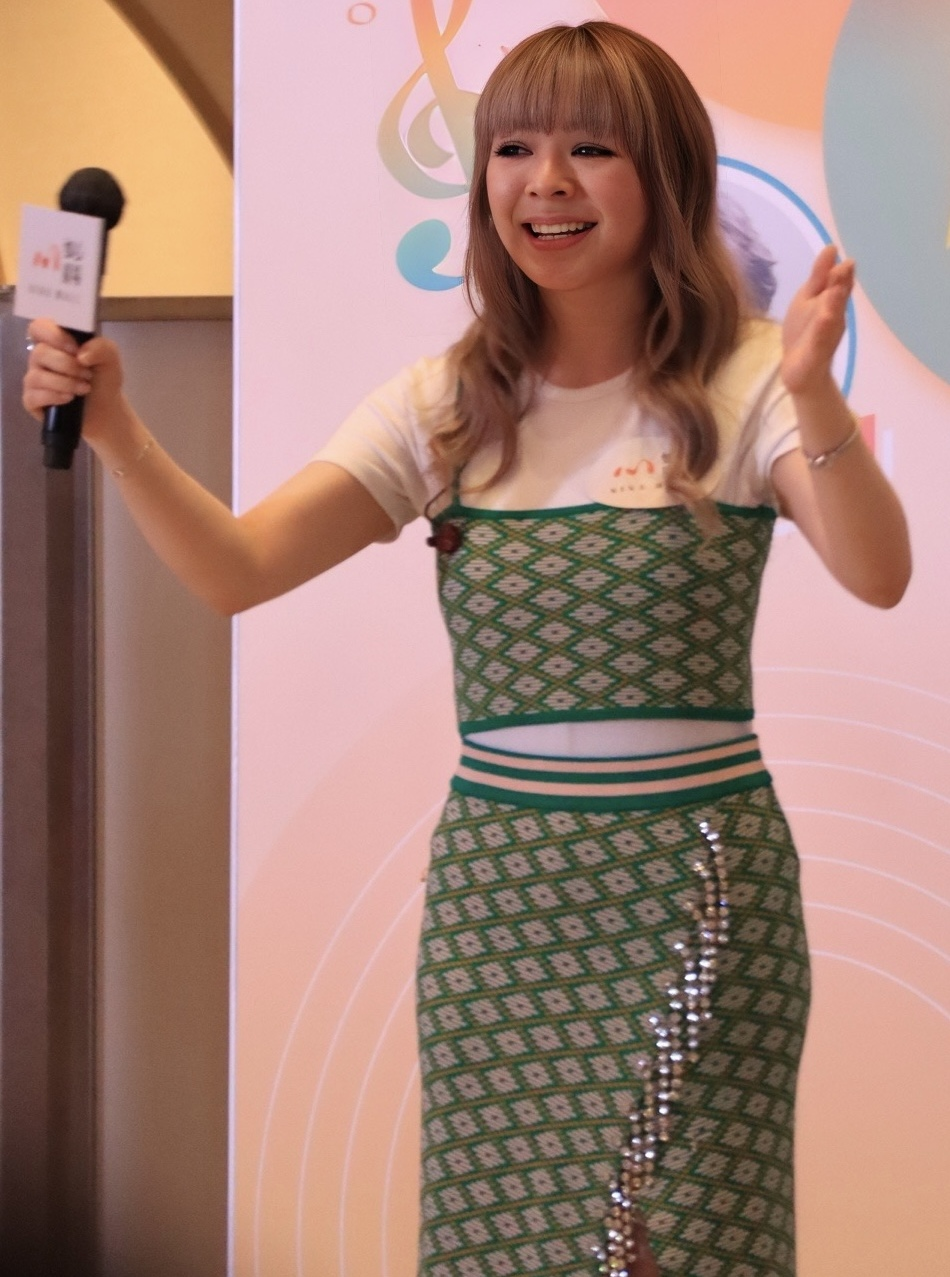
- Pronunciation: Wong Ho-yee
- Born: 18 June 1990 (age 36); British Hong Kong
- Other name: Joey Wong
- Education: King's College London
- Occupations: Singer; actress
- Years active: 2010 - present
- Agent: TVB
- Musical career
- Origin: Hong Kong
- Genres: Cantopop; Mandopop
- Instrument: Vocals
- Labels: Amusic; Sunny Idea; Voice Entertainment
- Website: Official Instagram

Chinese name
- Traditional Chinese: 王灝兒
- Simplified Chinese: 王灏儿
Transcriptions
Yue: Cantonese
- Jyutping: Wong^{4} Hou^{6}-ji^{4}

Joey Wong Ho-yee (Note: Chinese: 王灝兒; Jyutping: Wong^{4} Hou^{6}-ji^{4}) (born 18 June 1990), known professionally as JW, is a Hong Kong Cantopop singer and actress. Debuted in 2010, Wong was the youngest singer at the time to have won a "Golden Melody Song" at the Jade Solid Gold Best Ten Music Awards Presentation. She later found success with her 2015 hit "A Life of Contradictions". Wong ventured into acting after signing with Voice Entertainment in 2020, appearing in various TVB television series.

== Life and career ==
=== 1990–2010: Early life ===
Joey Wong was born on 18 June 1990, in Hong Kong. Her father has Chinese ancestry, while her mother has Spanish and Filipino roots. Her older sister, Cindy, is a lawyer. Wong's interest in music began after she got influenced and joined her older sister to participate in a local singing competition during primary school. She won first place and continued to participate in various singing competitions throughout her schooling years, some of which she won prizes.

Wong's aspirations for a singing career took a serious turn when she received an unexpected call from a friend, who arranged a meeting with Amusic's executive and singer, Leon Lai. It was by chance that Lai had heard a demo recording she had made at a friend's house. Around 2009–2010, after their meeting, Lai offered her a music contract. Prior to this opportunity, Wong had not considered singing as a professional career path. She attended Marymount Secondary School and South Island School before pursuing her higher education at King's College London where she obtained a bachelor's degree in geography in 2012. During her college years, she resided in the United Kingdom for her studies but would return to Hong Kong during the summer to record and perform music.

=== 2010–present: Career ===
Wong made her debut in the music scene with her first solo single, "Missing A Good Friend" (掛念好友), and followed it up with the duet "Love Diaries" (男人信什麼), alongside Janice Vidal, in the early half of 2010. To keep the public intrigued, she initially did not appear in either music videos or public performances. In July 2010, Wong was officially introduced to the public in her first concert titled "JW Missing Good Friend". Soon after, Wong released her first EP, Los Angeles (2010). Her achievements during this period included receiving awards such as Best New Artist and Golden Melody Song at major year-end music award shows. Following her strong debut, however, Wong faced a period of career stagnation and struggled to achieve significant success. In 2015, after signing with Sunny Idea, Wong's career took a positive turn with the release of "A Life of Contradictions" (矛盾一生), which garnered widespread attention, revitalizing her career. She shared her personal experience with the lyricist, which was later woven into the song's lyrics. Wong revealed in an interview that she "pour[ed] out all my feelings" during the recording process. The song achieved more than 18 million YouTube views and won several awards.

In August 2020, Wong signed with Voice Entertainment, a music subsidiary of TVB. From 2021 to 2022, she took on a coaching role on TVB's singing competition show Stars Academy. During the first season, Wong played a significant role in providing guidance to the runner-up, Chantel Yiu. In addition to her music career, Wong began venturing into acting. She made her notable acting appearance in TVB's ancient comedy series, Your Highest (2022), where she landed her first major role.

== Discography ==
- Los Angeles (2010)
- That's Me (2011)
- My Tale (2017)

=== List of songs by JW ===
* Note: Some song titles on this list are official English titles, while others are transliterations of the original Chinese titles.

List of songs by JW
Song	Other performer(s)	Writer(s)/Producer(s)	Album	Year	Ref.
"A Life Of Contradictions" (矛盾一生)	None	Terence Lam; Chan Wing-him; Randy Chow	My Tale	2015	
"A Sentimental Person" (性情中人)	William So	Albert Leung; Mark Lui	Non-album single	2014	
"Accompany You" (陪你)	None	J. Arie; Chung Suet-ying; Silverstrike	Non-single album	2023	
"Astronaut" (太空人)	None	Chan Wing-him; Randy Chow; Jon Reshard	My Tale	2016	
"Beautiful Battlefield" (美麗戰場)	None	Freddie Lo; Alex Lau	Non-single album Theme song of TVB series The War of Beauties	2022	
"Because Of Deep Love" (原來只因深愛著)	James Ng	Riley Pong; Chan Wing-him; Larry Wong; Terrence Lam; Randy Chow; Nick Wong; Schumann Lee	My Tale	2017	
"By My Side" (誰人在身邊)	None	Sandy Cheng; Alan Cheung; Herman To; Joseph Wei	Non-album single Theme song of TV series The Legend of Xiao Chuo	2021	
"Can't Give No More" (花不起溫暖)	None	Damon Chui; Hayes Yeung; Nick Wong; Alex Lau	Non-album single Theme song of TVB series Your Highness	2022	
"Could You Be My Friend" (Mandarin)	None	Michael Moog; Kimberly Cole; G. Jacobo Pablo Garcia; Cheung Cho-kiu; Mark Lui	Non-album single	2014	
"Domination" (主宰)	None	Chan Wing-him; Andrew Gilbert; Taneisha Jackson; Lee Yat-ding; Randy Chow	Non-album single	2018	
"Escape Door" (逃生門)	None	Endy Chow; Riley Pong; Johnny Yim; Schumann Lee	Non-album single	2019	
"Falling In Love"	None	Fire Lee; Janice Lee Thompsett	That's Me	2011	
"Feel The Bass"	None	Alzahn Shemo; Jonnic Lee Thompsett; Michael Moog	Non-album single	2013	
"FF"	None	T-ma; Jay Fung; JW; T-Rexx	Non-album single	2022	
"Filled With Love" (愛心灌溉)	None	Hayes Yeung; Joseph Wei	Non-album single Theme song of TVB series Come Home Love: Lo and Behold	2021	
"Fly Freely" (自由飛翔)	None	Terrence Lam; Chan Wing-him; Randy Chow; Nick Wong	My Tale	2016	
"Heaven at Thirteen" (十三歲的天堂)	None	Terrence Lam; Yiu Sum; Harris Ho	Non-album single	2023	
"Hopeless" (原來無明天)	None	Alex Lau; Hayes Yeung; Patrick Yip	Non-album single Theme song of TVB series Romeo and His Butterfly Lover	2023	
"How Many Years" (多少年)	None	Terrence Lam; Chan Wing-him; Randy Chow; Nick Wong	My Tale	2016	
"I Don't Want To Leave" (我不想別離)	None	Sandy Cheng; Damon Chui; Johnny Yim; Herman To; Joseph Wei	Non-album single Theme song of TVB series Arms Reaction 2021	2021	
"I Just Wanna Stay With You"	None	Chan Wing-him; Gareth Chan	Non-album single	2017	
"I Need A Friend"	None	Michael Moog; Kimberly Cole; G. Jacobo Pablo Garcia; Mark Lui	Non-album single	2014	
"Jealousy" (妒忌心)	None	Chan Wing-him; Carl Wong	Non-album single	2017	
"Juicy Girl"	None	Tim A. Wang; Stella Chow; Mark Lui; Bat Sing-gung	That's Me	2011	
"Love Diaries" (男人信什麼)	Janice Vidal	Albert Leung; Mark Lui	Los Angeles	2010	
"Mature Young Woman" (輕熟女)	None	Yeung Zan-bong; Chan Wing-him; Schumann Lee	Non-album single	2020	
"Missing A Good Friend" (掛念好友)	None	Joe Lei; Mark Lui	Los Angeles	2010	
"Missing You" (掛住你)	None	Chan Wing-him; Mark Lui	That's Me	2011	
"Nazca Lines" (納斯卡線)	None	Howie Yung; Wyman Wong; Randy Chow; Nick Wong	Non-album single	2022	
"No Self-Control" (毫無自制)	None	Stella Chow; Jonnic Lee Thompsett	That's Me	2011	
"Not Afraid Of Loneliness" (孤單不要怕)	None	Riley Pong; Edmond Tsang	Los Angeles	2010	
"Runaway"	None	Shimica Wong; Chan Wing-him; Dough-boy; Randy Chow	My Tale	2016	
"Seeing No One Today" (今天不見人)	None	Joe Lei; Mark Lui	Los Angeles	2010	
"Sense of Security" (安全感)	None	Chan Wing-him; Terrence Lam; Randy Chow; Nick Wong	Non-album single	2017	
"Short Story" (小故事)	None	Chan Wing-him; Terrence Lam; Randy Chow; Nick Wong	My Tale	2016	
"Stand by Me" (伴我左右)	None	Alan Cheung; Joe Lei; Herman Ho; Joseph Wei	Non-album single Theme song of TVB series Barrack O'Karma 1968	2022	
"Stupid BOII"	None	Shimica Wong; Chan Wing-him; Dough-boy; Silverstrike; Randy Chow	My Tale	2016	
"Sweet Talk To Me" (氹我)	None	Fire Lee; Mark Lui	That's Me	2011	
"Therapy" (分手後的治癒療程)	None	Zion Lee; GingerLemonCola; TonYnoT; Randy Chow	Non-album single	2023	
"Unsettled Girl" (飄浮女孩)	None	Yan Gin-keung; Mark Lui	Non-album single	2013	
"Victoria" (維多利亞)	None	Chan Wing-him; Phil Lam; Randy Chow	Non-album single	2018	
"Wave's One Hand" (揮揮手)	None	Chan Wing-him; Anthony Chue; Eye Fung; Schumann Lee	Non-album single	2018	
"Wish"	None	Kwong Ching-yan; Wayne James; Nick Wong; Alex Lau	Non-single album Theme song of TVB series Big White Duel 2	2022	
"Year-end Thankfulness" (年末感恩)	None	Chan Wing-him; Cousin Fung	Non-album single	2019	
"You'd Taken My Youth Away" (你帶着我的青春離去)	None	Chan Wing-him; Cousin Fung; Nick Wong; Randy Chow	Non-album single	2017	

=== Television series ===
Year	Title	Role	Notes	Ref.
2021	Sinister Beings	Pui-yee	Cameo	
2021	Fraudstars	Cheuk Yan-yan	Guest star	
2021	Stars Academy	Herself	Singing competition coach	
2021	Starry Starry Academy	Herself	Stars Academy making-of footage	
2021	First Live on Stage	Herself	Stars Academy concert	
2021	Forever Young at Heart	Miss Wong	Supporting role	
2022	Stars Academy 2	Herself	Singing competition coach	
2022	Your Highness	Miss Fok	Second lead role	
2022	The War of Beauties		Cameo	
2023	Treasure of Destiny	Jade	Cameo	
TBA	Your Highness 2		Second lead role	

== Awards and nominations ==
- Only major music awards are included per List of Hong Kong music awards. Most music nominations are excluded due to the lack of reliable sources.

Year	Award	Category	Nominated work	Results	Ref.
2010	33rd RTHK's Top Ten Chinese Songs Music Awards	Promising Newcomers (silver)	Herself	Won	
2010	2010 Metro Radio Music Awards	Best New Female Artists	Herself	Won	
2010	2010 Metro Radio Music Awards	Song of the Year	"Love Diaries" (男人信什麼)	Won	
2010	2010 Jade Solid Gold Music Awards	Best New Female Artists (gold)	Herself	Won	
2010	2010 Jade Solid Gold Music Awards	Golden Melody Song Award	"Love Diaries" (男人信什麼)	Won	
2010	2010 IFPI Hong Kong Record Sales Awards	Top Ten Best-selling Albums	Los Angeles	Won	
2010	2010 IFPI Hong Kong Record Sales Awards	Top Ten Best-selling Local Artists	Herself	Won	
2010	2010 IFPI Hong Kong Record Sales Awards	Best-selling Newcomer Female Artist	Herself	Won	
2013	2013 Metro Radio Music Awards	Most Popular Singers	Herself	Won	
2013	2013 Metro Radio Music Awards	Best Dance Songs	"Feel the Bass"	Won	
2014	2014 Metro Radio Mandarin Music Awards	Mandarin Powerful Dance Song	"Could You Be My Friend"	Won	
2014	2014 Metro Radio Mandarin Music Awards	Popular Idol	Herself	Won	
2014	2014 Metro Radio Music Awards	Best Dance Song	"Could You Be My Friend"	Won	
2014	2014 Metro Radio Music Awards	Best Dance Singer	Herself	Won	
2015	2015 Metro Radio Music Awards	Best Song Interpretation	Herself	Won	
2016	2016 Metro Radio Music Awards	Best Female Singer (bronze)	Herself	Won	
2016	2016 Ultimate Song Chart Awards	Best Female Singer (bronze)	Herself	Won	
2016	39th RTHK's Top Ten Chinese Songs Music Awards	Top Ten Chinese Golden Melody	"A Life of Contradictions" (矛盾一生)	Won	
2016	2016 Jade Solid Gold Awards	Golden Song Awards	"A Life of Contradictions" (矛盾一生)	Won	
2016	2016 Jade Solid Gold Awards	Outstanding Performance Awards	Herself	Won	
2017	40th RTHK's Top Ten Chinese Songs Music Awards	Outstanding Pop Singer Awards	Herself	Won	
2017	40th RTHK's Top Ten Chinese Songs Music Awards	Top Ten Chinese Golden Medley	"Because Of Deep Love" (原來只因深愛著) (with James Ng)	Won	
2017	2017 Metro Radio Music Awards	Best Duet Song	"Because Of Deep Love" (原來只因深愛著) (with James Ng)	Won	
2017	2017 Jade Solid Gold Awards	Best Duet Song (silver)	"Because Of Deep Love" (原來只因深愛著) (with James Ng)	Won	
2017	2017 Jade Solid Gold Awards	Gold Song Awards	"Sense of Security" (安全感)	Won	
2018	41st RTHK's Top Ten Chinese Songs Music Awards	Outstanding Pop Singer Awards	Herself	Won	
2018	2018 Jade Solid Gold Music Awards	Gold Song Awards	"You'd Taken My Youth Away" (你帶着我的青春離去)	Won	
2019	2019 Jade Solid Gold Music Awards	Gold Song Awards	"Escape Door" (逃生門)	Won	
2020	2020 Jade Solid Gold Music Awards	Gold Song Awards	"Mature Young Woman" (輕熟女)	Won	
2023	2023 Metro Radio Music Awards	Top Ten Songs	"Heaven at Thirteen" (十三歲的天堂)	Won	

== Concerts ==
- JW Missing Good Friends (2010)
- Stage of Grief (2016)
- Never Too Early (2018)
