= After Class =

After Class may refer to:

- After Class (film), a 2019 American comedy-drama film
- After Class (group), a Hong Kong Cantopop girl group
