= Chantel Yiu =

Hong Kong singer

- 姚焯菲
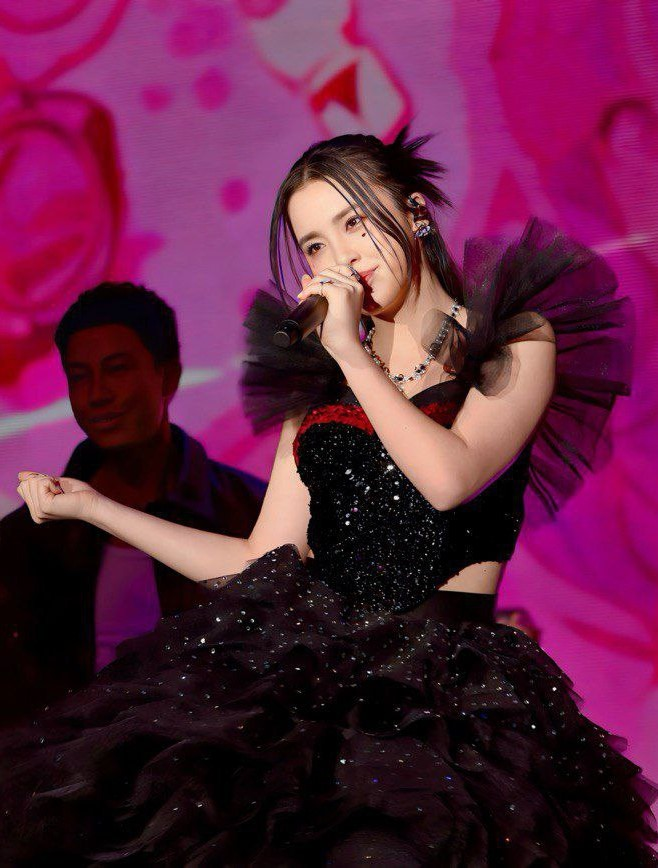
- Yiu in 2023
- Born: 22 September 2006 (age 20); Hong Kong
- Occupations: Singer; actress
- Agent: TVB
- Height: 1.65 m (5 ft 5 in)
- Musical career
- Genre: Cantopop
- Instruments: Vocals; piano
- Years active: 2021–present
- Label: All About Music
- Member of: After Class

Chinese name
- Chinese: 姚焯菲
Transcriptions
Standard Mandarin
- Hanyu Pinyin: Yáo Zhuōfēi
- Bopomofo: ㄧㄠˊ ㄓㄨㄛ ㄈㄟ
Yue: Cantonese
- Jyutping: jiu^{4} coek^{3} fei^{1}
- IPA: [jiw˩ tsʰœk̚˧ fej˥]

Chantel Yiu Cheuk-faye (Chinese: 姚焯菲, [jiw˩ tsʰœk̚˧ fej˥]; born 22 September 2006) is a Hong Kong singer and actress, and a member of the Hong Kong girl group After Class. She is noted for being the first runner-up of TVB's reality talent competition Stars Academy in 2021. Yiu made her solo debut in October 2021 with the single "So, This is Love" (原來談戀愛是這麼一回事).

== Early life ==
Yiu was born in Hong Kong on 22 September 2006, being the elder of two sisters. Her father, Raman Yiu (姚輝文), is an accountant who is a partner and the chief financial officer of the private equity fund Nexus Point and used to work in Bain Capital Asia, and her mother is also an accountant. She attended Good Hope School for kindergarten and primary school, then attended Christian Alliance International School until 2023, then transferred to Diocesan School for Girls in Auckland, New Zealand and graduated there in the following year with “Academic High Distinction”.

== Music career ==
Yiu became one of the contestants of TVB's reality talent competition Stars Academy in 2021, and her performance of Danny Chan's song "Love Prediction" (戀愛預告) in the competition gained her popularity. She became the first runner-up of the competition (with Gigi Yim being the winner), and debuted on 29 October 2022 with the single "So, This is Love".

In November 2021, Yiu, along with Yim, Yumi Chung and Windy Zhan, formed a girl group called "After Class", with the debut single "Present For Future" (要為今日回憶). She then received rookie awards in Metro Radio Hits Music Awards 2021, Ultimate Song Chart Awards Presentation 2021 and Hong Kong Gold Songs Award Presentation Ceremony 2021/2022 on 27 December 2021, 1 January 2022 and 24 July 2022, respectively.

In 2022, she released two singles, namely "Soulmate" (靈魂伴侶) and "BFF", which she was awarded for the latter at Metro Radio Hits Music Awards 2022. In the following year, she released her first CD single “Next Faye” along with a photo album named ONe, as well as being awarded in Metro Radio Hits Music Awards 2022 with the single.

In 2024, Yiu released "Can't Hide from Love", collaborated with MC, a Warner Music singer, which making her being the second TVB artist having singles in ViuTV chart after Grace Wong. She was then awarded “The Most Popular Television Song” in TVB Awards Presentation 2024 by the single “This Family”, the opening theme of Come Home Love: Lo and Behold.

In 2025, Yiu released "KMC", her first single as a songwriter. In the same year, she started studying Music Business in New York University.

== Acting career ==
Yiu made her acting debut on the TVB television series Forever Young at Heart, which she played a student having a crush with a teacher. While her second acting character was in another TVB television series Come Home Love: Lo and Behold as Ko Yat-tung.

== Discography ==
=== Singles ===
Title	Year	Peak chart positions	Album
Title	Year	HK	Album
"So, This is Love" (原來談戀愛是這麼一回事)	2021	–	So, This is Love
"Soulmate" (靈魂伴侶)	2022	–	Non-album singles
"BFF"	2022	–	Non-album singles
"Getaway" (小出走)	2023	–	Non-album singles
"Next Faye" (這個姿態)	2023	–	ONe
"Island of Purity" (初心小島)	2024	–	Non-album singles
"Dreamscape"	2024	–	Non-album singles
"Will You Be My Lover"	2024	–	Non-album singles
"Not Like You" (至少他不似你)	2024	–	Non-album singles
"New Fantasy"	2025	–	New Fantasy
"KMC"	2025	–	Non-album singles

==== Collaborations ====
Title	Year	Notes
"Can't Hide from Love" (誰能避開戀愛這事情) (with MC)	2024	Hong Kong Songs peak chart position: 13
"CYA" (with Windy Zhan, Yumi Chung)	2024	

== Filmography ==
=== Television series ===
Year	Title	Role
2021	Forever Young at Heart	Chan Ting (Chantel)
2025	Come Home Love: Lo and Behold	Ko Yat-tung
