= After Class (group) =

Hong Kong Cantopop musical girl group

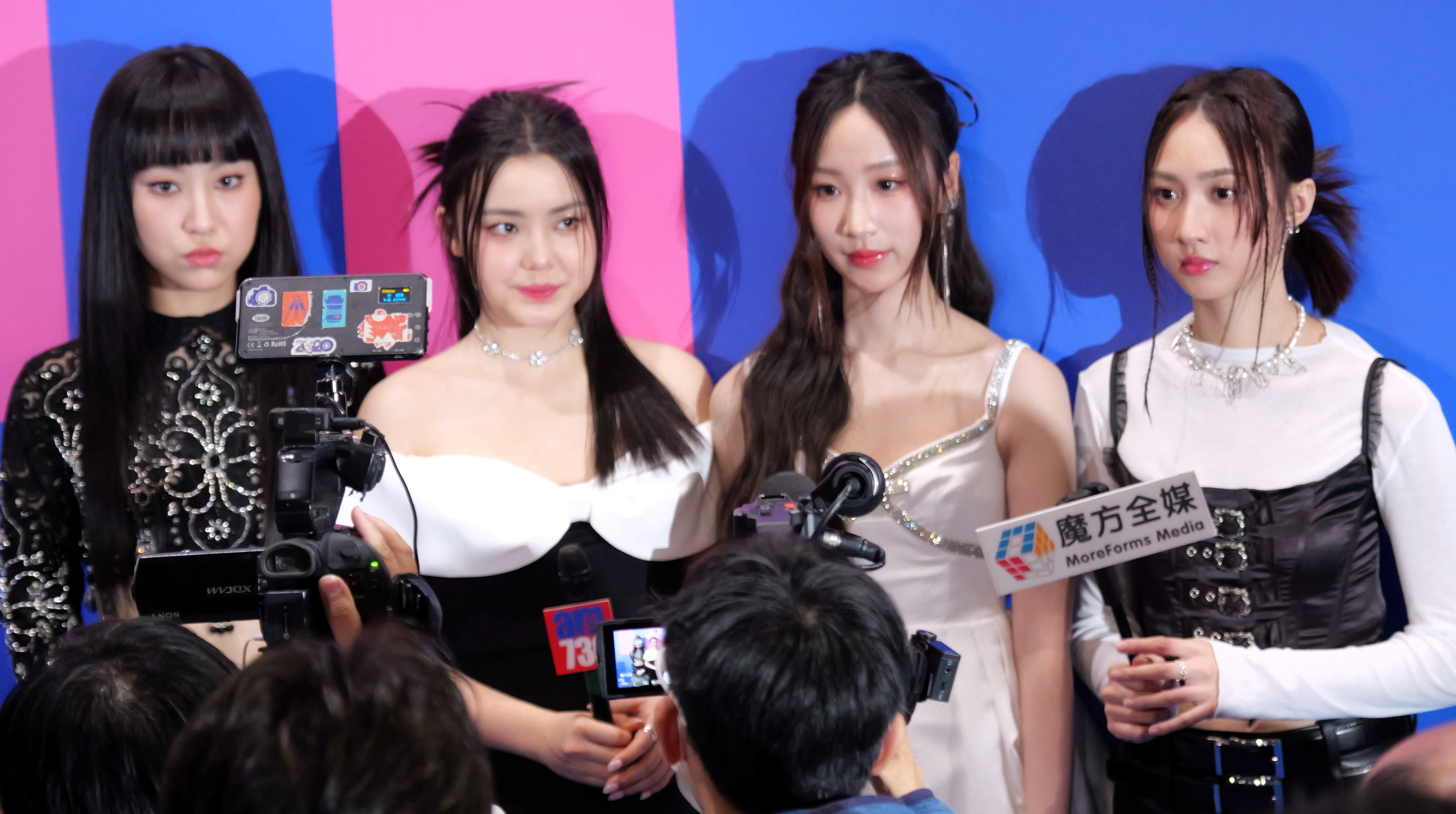
- After Class in an event in 2023; Starting from left: Gigi Yim, Chantel Yiu, Windy Zhan, Yumi Chung

Background information
- Also known as: "Four Little Flowers of Stars Academy" (聲夢四小花)
- Origin: Hong Kong
- Genre: Cantopop
- Occupation: Singers
- Years active: 2021–present
- Labels: All About Music; Television Broadcasts Limited
- Members: Windy Zhan; Chantel Yiu; Yumi Chung
- Past members: Gigi Yim

After Class is a Hong Kong Cantopop girl group formed from Hong Kong broadcaster TVB's reality talent show Stars Academy in 2021. The group consists of three members: Windy Zhan, Chantel Yiu and Yumi Chung. They debuted on 27 November 2021, with the first single Present for Future (要為今日回憶).

== History ==
=== 2021–22: Formation ===
In 2021, TVB started to create its own reality talent competition Stars Academy. In the competition, which is also the first season of its competition series, Gigi Yim, Windy Zhan, Chantel Yiu, and Yumi Chung are the youngest contestants among all.

The Quartet have been called the "Four Little Flowers of Stars Academy" (聲夢四小花) since the end of the competition. On 25 November 2021, all four members hinted that they would form a group called "After Class" through their Instagram accounts. Two days later, the music video of the group's debut "Present For Future" was released via YouTube. On 28 November, After Class made their live debut performance of "Present For Future" in the annual charity fundraising show Gala Spectacular, co-organised by the Po Leung Kuk and TVB, at the Hong Kong Coliseum. Later, the TVB drama Forever Young at Heart, which stars all four members, aired on the TVB Jade starting from 5 December 2021 till 13 February 2022, and their performances have attracted media attention.

On 23 January 2022, the group gained their first peak chart position in TVB with their debut "Present For Future". The group hosted their first virtual concert in "Yahoo Metaverse" organised by Yahoo Hong Kong on 17 June 2022.

On 16 November 2022, All About Music released a teaser of After Class's dance-pop single "Not Givin' Up", and the song was sent to local radio stations the next day. On 18 November, the lyrics video of "Not Givin' Up" was released via YouTube. On 4 December, After Class's live performance of the song at the TVB City was premiered in the annual charity fundraising show Tung Wah Charity Show, co-organised by the Tung Wah Group of Hospitals and TVB.

On 23 December 2022, After Class received a Cantopop rookie award at the Yahoo Asia Multiverse Buzz Awards 2022 which was organised by Yahoo Hong Kong and took place at the KITEC, and it was the first award the group received. On 29 December, After Class received another rookie award at the 2022 Metro Radio Music Awards which was hosted by the Metro Broadcast Corporation and held at the HKCEC, and the group performed the song "Not Givin' Up" live at the award presentation ceremony.

== Name ==
According to member Chantel Yiu, their manager named the group "After Class" as the members could only work and meet after class.

== Members ==
English name	Chinese Name	Birthday	Rank in Stars Academy
Windy Zhan	詹天文	2 March 2006 (age 20)	10
Chantel Yiu	姚焯菲	22 September 2006 (age 20)	2
Yumi Chung	鍾柔美	21 December 2006 (age 19)	3

=== Past members ===
English name	Chinese Name	Birthday	Rank in Stars Academy
Gigi Yim	炎明熹	9 April 2005 (age 21)	1

== Discography ==
=== Singles ===
List of singles, with selected chart positions
Title	Year	Peak chart positions	Album
Title	Year	HK	Album
"Present For Future" (要為今日回憶)	2021	—	Non-album singles
"Not Givin' Up"	2022	—	Non-album singles
"—" denotes a recording that did not chart.

== Awards and nominations ==
Award ceremony	Year	Category	Result
Yahoo Asia Multiverse Buzz Awards	2022	Popular Groups by Votes	Final 3
Yahoo Asia Multiverse Buzz Awards	2022	Music Rookies (Groups)	Won
Metro Radio Music Awards	2022	Best Rookies	Won
