= Windy Zhan =

Hong Kong pop singer and actress (born 2006)

- 詹天文
- Zhan in November 2026
- Born: Zhan Tianwen; 2 March 2006 (age 20); Hong Kong, China
- Education: Ma On Shan Methodist Primary School (2012–2016); International Christian Quality Music Secondary and Primary School (ICQM) (2016–2024)
- Occupations: Singer; actress
- Agent: TVB (2021–present)
- Musical career
- Genres: Cantopop; Vocal music
- Instrument: Vocals
- Years active: 2021–present
- Label: All About Music (2021–present)
- Member of: After Class; (2021–present)
- Website: Windy Zhan on Instagram; Windy Zhan on Facebook; Windy Zhan on Weibo (in Chinese)

Chinese name
- Chinese: 詹天文
Transcriptions
Standard Mandarin
- Hanyu Pinyin: Zhān Tiānwén
- Bopomofo: ㄓㄢ ㄊㄧㄢ ㄨㄣˊ
Yue: Cantonese
- Yale Romanization: jīm tīn màhn
- Jyutping: Zim1 Tin1Man4
- IPA: Cantonese pronunciation: [tsim^{5} tʰin^{5} mɐn^{21}]

Signature
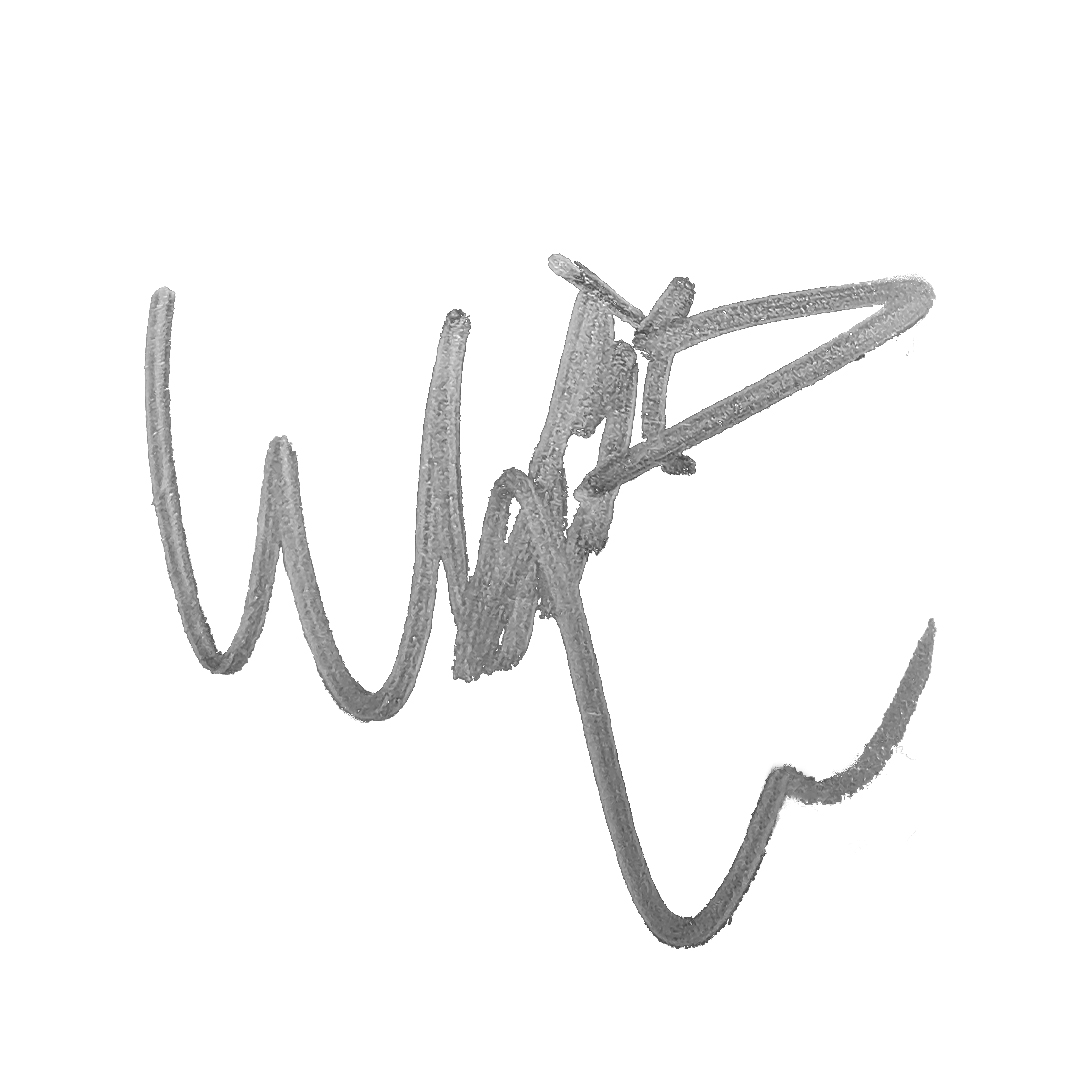

Windy Zhan Tian-wen (Chinese: 詹天文; pinyin: Zhān Tiānwén; Jyutping: Zim1 Tin1Man4; born 2 March 2006) is a Hong Kong female Cantopop singer and actress, and a member of the Hong Kong girl group After Class. She is a contestant of the season 1 of TVB's 2021 reality singing talent competition Stars Academy. Zhan made her solo debut on 31 March 2023 with the single Reminiscence: Distance (沒有你的新學期).

== Early life ==
Born in Hong Kong with a Hubei descent on 2 March 2006, Zhan is the smallest child in a family of three children (two elder brothers). Zhan has been learning singing since the age of three, and learning and practising vocal music with Hong Kong professional sopranos Wang Shan (王珊) and Candy Chik (戚芷君) since the age of five. From 2012, she attended the Ma On Shan Methodist Primary School (馬鞍山循道衛理小學) and later won multiple awards at the Hong Kong Schools Music Festival. She also once performed as a soloist with the City Chamber Orchestra of Hong Kong. In 2016, she switched to the International Christian Quality Music Secondary and Primary School (ICQM) to continue her primary and secondary school studies until 2024.

== Career ==
=== 2020–2022: Stars Academy and group debut ===
In 2020, Zhan was qualified as one of the 15, and one of the youngest, contestants in the season 1 of TVB's 2021 reality singing talent competition Stars Academy. Some of her notable performances in the show include her rendition of G.E.M.'s Bubble (泡沫), and Bang Bang by Jessie J, Ariana Grande, and Nicki Minaj. She also performed Sandy Lam's Without You, I Still Love You (沒有你還是愛你) as a counterpart to Gigi Yim who also performed that song in a same episode of the show. Zhan eventually ranked tenth place in the show.

Following the Stars Academy season 1, Zhan signed the sublabel All About Music under the record label TVB Music Group, and debuted as a member of the girl group After Class on 27 November 2021, along with another three Stars Academy season 1 contestants Gigi Yim, Chantel Yiu, and Yumi Chung, with their debut single Present For Future (要為今日回憶).

Together with other 14 contestants of the show, Zhan then performed in her first TV drama series Forever Young at Heart in late 2021 and early 2022. In the series, she plays a secondary school student with extraordinary musical talent but is often ignored by her parents at home. She also performed the Les oiseaux dans la charmille aria, extracted from the opera The Tales of Hoffmann written by Jacques Offenbach, in the series.

During 2022 to 2023, Zhan sang drama songs or themes in Cantonese for several TV dramas that were broadcast on TVB, including the episode insert song Saying "I Do" Again (再說我願意) for Stranger Anniversary (雙生陌生人), the ending theme Love Permit (愛情許可證) for Royal Feast (尚食), and the episode insert song So That's Being Lonely Repeatedly (原來寂寞得多) for Treasure of Destiny (新四十二章).

=== 2023–present: Solo debut ===
On 31 March 2023, Zhan formally debuted as a Cantopop solo artist with her single Reminiscence: Distance (沒有你的新學期), a song about friendship and love in secondary school life with its music video filmed at the ICQM, her alma mater.

In June 2023, Zhan participated in a music competition of the ICQM as coloratura soprano, singing the aria Der Hölle Rache kocht in meinem Herzen (more commonly known as the Queen of the Night aria) in the second act of Mozart's opera The Magic Flute (Die Zauberflöte). The video of her performance was later reposted by a Taiwan-based classical music Facebook page, and was highly praised by netizens, mainly Taiwanese.

In July 2023, Zhan covered Elisa Chan Kit-ling's (陳潔靈) 1983 single Platinum Elevator (白金升降機) as an episode insert song of the TVB drama series Unchained Medley (靈戲逼人).

On 20 October 2023, Zhan released her second and dance-pop single The Great Sculptor (大雕刻家). She was then awarded the "Best Rookie" (勁爆新人) at the 2023 Metro Radio Hits Music Awards (新城勁爆頒獎禮) held by Metro Broadcast Corporation, and the "Most Promising Rookie: Silver Award" (最有前途新人獎：銀獎) at the RTHK's 2024 Top Ten Chinese Gold Songs Award (十大中文金曲頒獎音樂會).

Being a candidate of the 2024 HKDSE, Zhan announced in April 2024 that she has been accepted to admission with an entrance scholarship to the Berklee College of Music in Boston, USA. But on 29 July 2024, Zhan announced her decision to enroll in the Xinghai Conservatory of Music in Guangzhou, China, instead.

== Discography ==
=== Singles ===
==== As lead artist ====
Title	Year	Peak chart positions	Album	Ref.
Title	Year	HK	Album	Ref.
"Saying "I Do" Again" (再說我願意)	2022	—	Ending theme of Stranger Anniversary (雙生陌生人)	
"Love Permit" (愛情許可證)	2022	—	Cantonese version of the ending theme of Royal Feast (尚食)	
"My Little Darling" (荳芽夢)	2022	—	With Rowena Cortes (露雲娜), cover of the opening theme of 1981 TVB drama series My Little Darling (荳芽夢)	
"So That's Being Lonely Repeatedly" (原來寂寞得多)	2023	—	Episode insert song of Treasure of Destiny (新四十二章)	
"Reminiscence: Distance" (沒有你的新學期)	2023	—	Non-album single	
"Courage to Acquire Happiness" (得到快樂的勇氣)	2023	—	Cantonese version of the ending theme of New Life Begins (川內相親)	
"Platinum Elevator" (白金升降機)	2023	—	Episode insert song of Unchained Medley (靈戲逼人)	
"Forget about Life but Remember Death" (忘生記死)	2023	—	Opening theme of Romeo And His Butterfly Lover (羅密歐與祝英台)	
"The Great Sculptor" (大雕刻家)	2023	—	Non-album single	
"Troubleshoot" (麻煩彈開)	2024	—	Non-album single	

== Filmography ==
=== Television series ===
Year	Title	Original Title	Role	Notes/Ref.
2021	Forever Young at Heart	青春本我	Windy Ngai Wan-dik (倪韻廸)	

== Awards and nominations ==
Year	Award	Category	Nominated work	Result	Ref.
2023	Metro Radio Hits Music Awards 2023 (新城勁爆頒獎禮2023)	Best Rookie (勁爆新人)	—N/a	Won	
2024	45th Top Ten Chinese Gold Songs Award (第四十五屆十大中文金曲)	Most Promising Rookie: Silver Award (最有前途新人獎：銀獎)	—N/a	Won	
