= International Christian Quality Music Secondary and Primary School =

School in Diamond Hill, Hong Kong

Coordinates: 22.34528°N 114.20552°E

- 國際基督教優質音樂中學暨小學
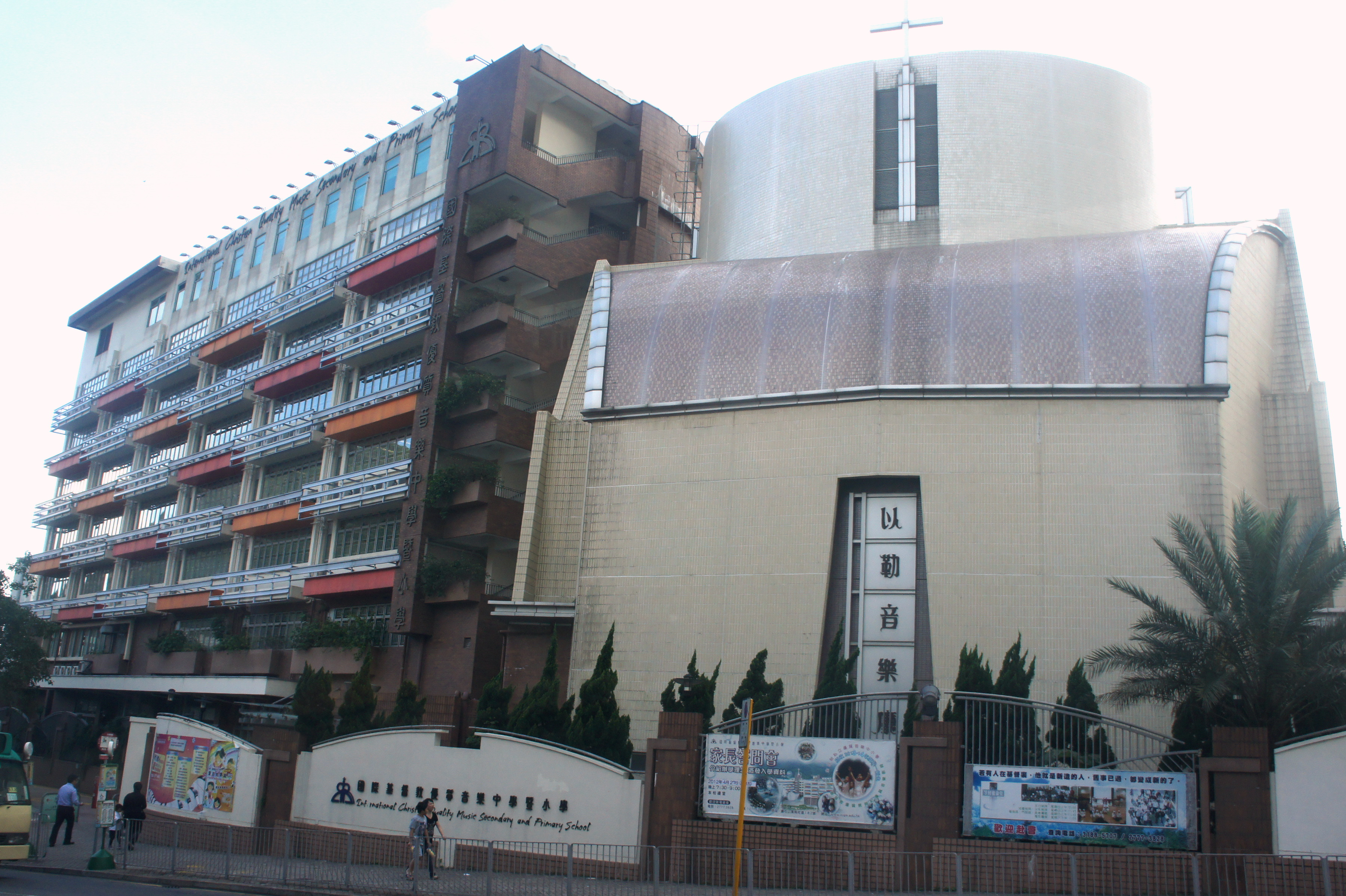
- 182 Po Kong Village Road, Diamond Hill, Kowloon, Hong Kong

Information
- Type: Private school
- Motto: Let the word of Christ dwell in you richly in all wisdom; teaching and admonishing one another in psalms and hymns and spiritual songs, singing with grace in your hearts to the Lord. Colossians 3:16
- Religious affiliation: Christianity
- Established: 2003
- Principal: Mr. Chan Wing Sang
- Faculty: 120 people
- Enrollment: 1029 people
- Affiliation: Hong Kong International Institute of Music (HKIIM)
- Website: www.icqm.edu.hk

International Christian Quality Music Secondary and Primary School
- Traditional Chinese: 國際基督教優質音樂中學暨小學
- Simplified Chinese: 国际基督教优质音乐中学暨小学
Transcriptions
Standard Mandarin
- Hanyu Pinyin: Guójì Jīdūjiào Yōuzhì Yīnyuè Zhōngxué jì Xiǎoxué
Yue: Cantonese
- Jyutping: gwok3 zai3 gei1 duk1 gaau3 jau1 zat1 jam1 ngok6 zung1 hok6 kei3 siu2 hok6

International Christian Quality Music Secondary and Primary School (國際基督教優質音樂中學暨小學 ICQM) is the first music school in Hong Kong. It is situated in 183 Po Kong Village Road, Diamond Hill, Kowloon.

ICQM has a concert hall (the Jehovahjireh Concert Hall), two chapels, 40 music rooms. There is an electronic music studio and 2 computer rooms.

== Jehovahjireh Concert Hall ==
The concert hall's architect was Joseph Ho of Hsin Yieh Architects and the acoustician was Prof. Ir. Dr. James Wing Ho Wong, the President of Allied Acoustics, Allied Environmental Consultants Limited, he brought the first adjustable acoustics reverberation chambers auditorium design to Hong Kong. The Jehovahjireh Concert Hall, with 798 seats and incorporated sacred geometry, boasts superb acoustics. The hall has an acoustic canopy which adapts the hall for different musical performances.

There are 1029 students.

== Notable alumni ==
- Wong Ji-yuet – activist and politician
- Windy Zhan – Hong Kong Cantopop singer
