= Forever Young at Heart =

Hong Kong television series (2021–2022)

- Also known as: 青春本我
- Genre: Youth; Secondary school; Musical; Ensemble drama; Teen drama
- Screenplay by: Erica Li; Ki Kin-chung; Helen Wong; Eric Li
- Directed by: Erica Li; Ki Kin-chung; Ho Chun-yue; Yeung Yiu-wah
- Starring: Gigi Yim; Chantel Yiu; Yumi Chung; Windy Zhan; Aska Cheung; Archie Sin; Rock Ho
- Theme music composer: Andy Schaub
- Opening theme: "Forever Young at Heart" by Archie Sin & Rock Ho
- Country of origin: Hong Kong
- Original language: Cantonese
- No. of episodes: 10

Production
- Executive producer: Yu-fong Peng
- Producer: Erica Mak
- Production location: Hong Kong
- Editor: Li Ka-wing
- Running time: approx. 45 minutes per episode
- Production company: TVB

Original release
- Network: TVB
- Release: 5 December 2021 – 13 February 2022

Forever Young at Heart (Chinese: 青春本我; lit. 'My Egoistic Youth') is a Hong Kong musical television series produced by television network TVB. It premiered on 5 December 2021 and continued until 13 February 2022 for 10 episodes. With school campus setting as the backdrop, the show chronicles the lives of a group of secondary school students and their internal struggles at the fictional Innovative Dreamers' College.

== Synopsis ==
School life is often regarded as the most vibrant and carefree phase in a person's life. However, it is not without its share of psychological and behavioral challenges. This plot revolves around the journey of a group of young secondary school students as they navigate the complexities of their family dynamics, relationships, friendships, bullying, and the confusion that often accompanies adolescence. Ultimately, they overcome these obstacles and uncertainties, demonstrating their personal growth along the way.

== Cast ==
- Gigi Yim as Gigi Ho Chin-chin
- Chantel Yiu as Chantel Chan Ting
- Yumi Chung as Yumi Yip Man-yee
- Windy Zhan as Windy Ngai Wan-dik
- Aeren Man as Aeren Yeung Ngoi-lam
- Sherman Poon as Sherman Cheung Siu-man
- Kaitlyn Lam as Kaitlyn Lee Heung-lin
- Venus Lam as Venus Fung Lok-si
- Lolita Tsoi as Lolita Lo Lai-sing
- Aska Cheung as Aska Ngai Ka-dik
- Archie Sin as Archie Yip Ar-chee
- Rock Ho as Rock Mak Lok-hak
- Eden Lau as Eden Yan Yin-tang
- Lee Siu-kin as Lai Siu-kin
- Felix Lam as Felix Ko Fu-nik
- Steven Suen as Hu Ji
- Hugo Wong as Hugo Wu Hiu-kong

=== Supporting cast ===
- Joey Wong as Miss Wong – a psychologist
- James Ng as Yip Sir – a music teacher
- Brian Chu as Chu Sir – a Chinese teacher
- Andy Lin as On Sir – a geography teacher
- Maverick Mak as Mak Sir – a PE teacher
- Jinny Ng as Miss Yim – a math teacher
- Tania Chan as Miss Man – an English teacher
- Wong Cho-lam as Chow Chi-ching – school chancellor
- Patrick Dunn Tse as O Lam – school principal
- Philip Keung
- Alice Chan
- Chin Ka-lok
- Angela Tong
- Strawberry Yeung

== Production and background ==
TVB's singing competition television series Stars Academy was premiered in April–July 2021 to considerable popularity. In June 2021, the TVB's then-Deputy General Manager Eric Tsang had an idea to create a tailor-made musical television series starring the show's contestants after its conclusion. Some contestants from TVB's dancing competition show Dance for Life (2021) were also cast. He invited content creator Erica Li to be its creative director. The plotline contains psychological elements, including mental health issues teenagers experience during their adolescent years, infusing with singing and dancing in a secondary school setting. Screenwriting involved the help of counseling psychologists and the incorporation of real-life cases. As the cast transitioned from singing to their first attempt at acting, the writers closely followed the contestants' traits while creating the characters and plotline to match their background. Li personally met with the actors and was inspired by some of their own struggle stories.

Principal photography ran through September–November 2021. Some of the school-age actors mainly filmed during the weekends to accommodate their academic schedules. The shooting took place at various school locations including Kowloon Tong and Sha Tin, Hong Kong. The series features various original songs with musician Johnny Yim serving as the musical director and Maverick Mak as the dance director. Several Stars Academy contestants were involved in the composition and writing process, including Archie Sin, Aska Cheung, Rock Ho, Kaitlyn Lam, and Aeren Man. The series featured supporting appearances by well-known Hong Kong singers, including JW (a Stars Academy coach), Jinny Ng, and James Ng.

== Music ==
=== Digital release ===
Forever Young At Heart

Soundtrack album by Various Artists
- Released: 2021–2022
- Studio: Abbey Road Studios
- Genre: Cantopop
- Language: Cantonese; Mandarin; English
- Label: All About Music
- Producer: Johnny Yim

Track Listing
No.	Title	Lyrics	Music	Artist(s)	Length
1.	"chop-chop (快啲快啲)"	Erica Li & Ka-wai Pang	Johnny Yim	Archie Sin, Aska Cheung, Felix Lam, Hugo Wong, Rock Ho, Steven Suen, Aeren Man, Kaitlyn Lam, Lolita Tsoi, Sherman Poon, Venus Lam & Windy Zhan	3:30
2.	"I Me Mine Myself (自我推介)"	Erica Li	Johnny Yim	Aeren Man, Kaitlyn Lam, Sherman Poon, Windy Zhan & Yumi Chung	3:08
3.	"Everything Will Be Alright (別難過)"	Aska Cheung	Aska Cheung	Aska Cheung & Aeren Man	3:18
4.	"BroMance (兄弟幫) dance version"	Aska Cheung & Ka-wai Pang	Archie Sin, Aska Cheung & Kaitlyn Lam	Aska Cheung, Archie Sin, Eden Lau, Markii & Rock Ho	3:51
5.	"It's Complicated (複雜)"	Aska Cheung	Aska Cheung, Kaitlyn Lam & Johnny Yim	Gigi Yim	3:12
6.	"Soulmate (靈魂伴侶)"	Erica Li & Rock Ho	Bing-yan Leung	Chantel Yiu	3:49
7.	"The Fool (傻人)"	Erica Li & Archie Sin	Kaitlyn Lam	Yumi Chung	2:35
8.	"Quicksnap (#即影即友)"	Ka-wai Pang	Ka-wai Pang	Chantel Yiu, Gigi Yim & Yumi Chung	3:21
9.	"Forever Young At Heart (青春本我)"	Andy Schaub, Erica Li, Aeren Man & Rock Ho	Andy Schaub	Archie Sin & Rock Ho	3:42
10.	"Had It All"	Andy Schaub	Andy Schaub	Andy Schaub	4:06
11.	"BroMance (兄弟幫) Basketball dance version"	Aska Cheung	Archie Sin & Aska Cheung & Kaitlyn Lam	Aska Cheung & Eden Lau	2:06

=== Physical release ===
The physical soundtrack album was released on 14 February 2022 and contains all the digital released songs, excluding "BroMance" (Basketball dance Version) and "Had It All". It peaked at number one on Hong Kong Record Merchants Association chart. A second edition was released on 14 March 2022 following its first print's popularity and also peaked at number one on the same chart. (Note: The weekly "Top ten album" sales chart is announced on RTHK's radio show Made In Hong Kong every Friday.)

== List of cover songs ==
- "School Opening Ceremony" (開學禮) originally by Hacken Lee
- "Sunshine" (陽光) originally by Leon Lai
- "Little Story" (小故事) originally by JW
- "I Still Love You Without You" (沒有你還是愛你) originally by Sandy Lam
- "Unconditional" (無條件) originally by Eason Chan
- "Love Is Not Easy" (越難越愛) originally by Jinny Ng
- The Tales of Hoffmann ("Les oiseaux dans la charmille" aria)
- "Love Prediction" (戀愛預告) originally by Sandy Lamb
- "So She Doesn't Love Me Enough" (原來她不夠愛我) originally by James Ng
- "The Great Waterway" (偉大航道) originally by C Kwan
- "Puzzle" (拼圖) originally by Stars Academy contestants

== Viewership ratings ==
Episode	Airing date	Average rating (Note: According to Hong Kong's TV rating system, each rating point represents approximately 64,670 viewers.)	Ref.
1	5 December 2021	16.8 points	
2	12 December 2021	14.6 points	
3	19 December 2021	11.5 points	
4	26 December 2021	12.1 points	
5	9 January 2022	16.1 points	
6	16 January 2022	16.5 points	
7	23 January 2022	14.6 points	
8	30 January 2022	14.9 points	
9	6 February 2022	14.7 points	
10	13 February 2022	16.2 points	

== Awards and nominations ==
Year	Award	Category	Nominated work	Result	Ref.
2022	New York Festivals TV & Film Awards	Children/Youths Entertainment Program	Forever Young at Heart (bronze)	Won	
2022	Asian Academy Creative Awards	Best Theme Song Or Title Theme	"Forever Young At Heart" by Archie Sin & Rock Ho	Won	
