= Yumi Chung =

Hong Kong singer

- 鍾柔美
- Chung in 2026
- Born: Yumi Belza Bayanin; 21 December 2006 (age 19); Hong Kong
- Education: ECF Saint Too Canaan College
- Occupations: Singer; actress
- Agent: TVB
- Musical career
- Genres: Cantopop; Pinoy pop
- Instruments: Vocals; guitar; saxophone; piano
- Years active: 2015–present
- Label: All About Music
- Member of: After Class

Chinese name
- Chinese: 鍾柔美
Transcriptions
Standard Mandarin
- Hanyu Pinyin: Zhōng Róuměi
- Bopomofo: ㄓㄨㄥ ㄖㄡˊ ㄇㄟˇ
- Wade–Giles: Chung^{1} Jou^{2} Mei^{3}
Yue: Cantonese
- Jyutping: zung^{1} jau^{4} mei^{5}
- IPA: [tsʊŋ˥ jɐw˩ mej˩˧]

Yumi Chung Yau Mei (Chinese: 鍾柔美, Jyutping: zung^{1} jau^{4} mei^{5}; born 21 December 2006), also known by her Philippine name as Yumi Belza Bayanin, is a Hong Kong-born Filipino singer and actress, and a member of the Hong Kong girl group After Class. She is noted for being the 2nd runner-up in TVB's reality talent competition Stars Academy in 2021. Chung made her solo debut in February 2022 with the single "Breakin' My Heart".

== Early life ==
Chung was born on 21 December 2006 in Hong Kong, to a Hong Kong Chinese father and a Filipino mother. She attended in Nancy Sit's talent school and joined a girl group named Honey Bees with other students in the school. She left Honey Bees and later joined another girl group named A Little Bit Shy with other 6 girls at the age of 10. She also worked as child actress, which one of her portrayal is being the childhood Leung Sum, which the adulthood is portrayed by Tavia Yeung, in Momentary Lapse of Reason.

== Music career ==
Chung became one of the contestants of TVB's reality talent competition Stars Academy in 2021, and her performance of Aaron Kwok's "The Wild City" (狂野之城) in the competition gained her popularity. After the performance clip was posted on YouTube, it once topped the YouTube trend list and reached 1 million views within five days, accumulating more than 3.1 million views. She became the third contestant on the show to have exceeded 1 million views with a single performance. The song also became the first dance song on the show to have over one million views. She eventually won the third place in the finals of Stars Academy.

In October, Chung sang the theme song named 不想輕躺 for the TV drama Heart City Hong Kong, Prop Up Youth (Chinese: 青年心城之撐起青春). She became the second contestant of Stars Academy to release a solo single after Gigi Yim, and became the first to release a theme song of a drama among the contestants of Stars Academy. In November, Chung, along with Gigi Yim, Chantel Yiu and Windy Zhan, formed a girl group called After Class, with their debut single "Present for Future" (要為今日回憶).

In February 2022, Chung released a single named "Breakin' My Heart", which is her debut single other than drama theme songs. She also released another single named "Wanna Be Close to U" in October of the same year.

In 2023, two more singles were released: "y2k還襯我麼?" in July, and "下一個暑假" in September.

== Acting career ==
Chung made her first acting after Stars Academy on the TVB television series Forever Young at Heart in 2021, which a bully victim was portrayed and she sang the insert song of that scene.

== Discography ==
=== Singles ===
==== As lead artist ====
Title	Year	Peak chart positions	Album
Title	Year	HK	Album
"不想輕躺"	2021	—	Theme song of Heart City Hong Kong, Prop Up Youth
"傻人"	2021	—	Insert song of Forever Young At Heart
"Breakin' My Heart"	2022	—	Non-album single
"Wanna Be Close to U	2022	—	Non-album single
"y2k還襯我麼"	2023	—	Non-album single
"寵寵"	2023	—	Theme song of My Pet My Angel
"下一個暑假"	2023	—	Non-album single
"Crack!"	2024	—	Non-album single
"Masterpiece"	2024	—	Non-album single

== Filmography ==
=== Television series ===
Year	Title	Original Title	Role	Notes/Ref.
2015	Momentary Lapse Of Reason	收規華	Leung Sum (childhood)	
2016	A Fist Within Four Walls	城寨英雄	Unnamed character	
2017	Tiger Mom Blues	親親我好媽	Sun Kai	
2017	Provocateur	與諜同謀	Unnamed character	
2017	The Forgotten Valley	平安谷之詭谷傳說	Ng Siu Chui	
2021	Forever Young At Heart	青春本我	Yip Man Yee Yumi	
2026	Pretty Dangerous	臥底嬌娃	Lau Po Yee (Bowie)	

=== Films ===
Year	Title	Original title	Role	Notes/Ref.
2017	Transformed	Transformed	Rose	
2018	Dearest Anita	朝花夕拾.芳華絕代	Olivia	
