= Stars Academy =

Hong Kong singing competition series

- Also known as: 聲夢傳奇
- Genre: Reality competition
- Written by: Yuen Sze-yung (2021); Wong Ka-lok (2021); Chan Fung-san (2022); Chan Wai-lan (2022); Cheng Sui-kei (2022)
- Presented by: Sammy Leung
- Country of origin: Hong Kong
- Original language: Cantonese
- No. of seasons: 2
- No. of episodes: 29

Production
- Producers: Lam Chun-man (2021); Keung Yin-hoi (2021); Chan Yuk-leung (2021); Mok Chun-tung (2021); Cheng Yu-sing (2022)
- Production location: Hong Kong
- Running time: approx. 70 minutes
- Production companies: TVB; TVB Music Group

Original release
- Network: TVB Jade
- Release: 10 April 2021 – 2 October 2022

Stars Academy (Chinese: 聲夢傳奇; lit. 'Legend of a Musical Dream') is a Hong Kong singing competition television series created and produced by television network TVB and its subsidiary, TVB Music Group. The show ran for two seasons from 2021 to 2022, aiming to discover unsigned young singing talents. Its judging panel featured various Hong Kong music executives, music producers, singer-songwriters, radio DJs, and music critics. The winners of the two seasons were Gigi Yim and Jasmine Yam.

== Format ==
The singing competition spans multiple seasons, featuring pre-recorded rounds and a live finale. Contestants showcase their talents individually or in groups, progressing through various rounds and facing eliminations. Coaches, composed of established singers, form teams and guide contestants, while judges, including industry professionals like music executives from major record labels, music producers, singer-songwriters, radio DJs, and music critics, provide evaluations. (Note: Major record labels include Emperor Entertainment Group, Media Asia Music, Sony Music Hong Kong, TVB Music Group, Universal Music Hong Kong, and Warner Music Hong Kong.) In all rounds except the live finale, contestants are evaluated based on judges' scores. The ultimate winner is determined through a combination of judges' scores and audience votes in the grand finale, where the voting window opens for a specific timeframe leading up to, and closing at a designated time on the finale day. The format combines individual performances, team dynamics, and themed challenges.

The winner receives a monetary prize of HKD $100,000. In the second season, additional prizes were introduced for the first and second runners-up, as well as other awards for remaining finalists. The eligible age-range for contestants is 30 years old and below.

== Series overview ==
Johnny Yim took on the role of music director, and Sammy Leung served as the host for both seasons. Following the competition, TVB maintains a fixed-period management contract with the contestants.

Winners of Stars Academy

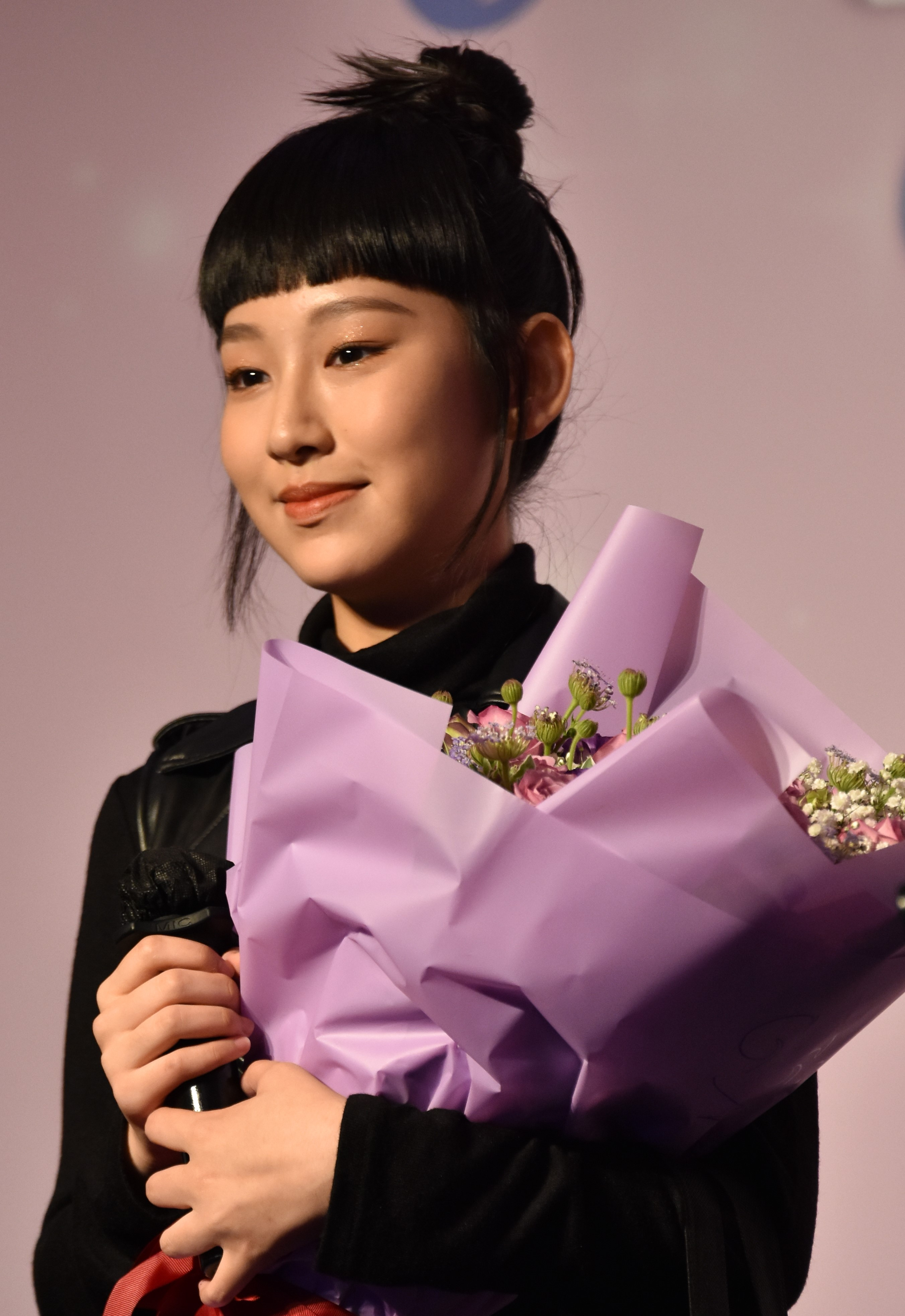
Gigi Yim (2021)

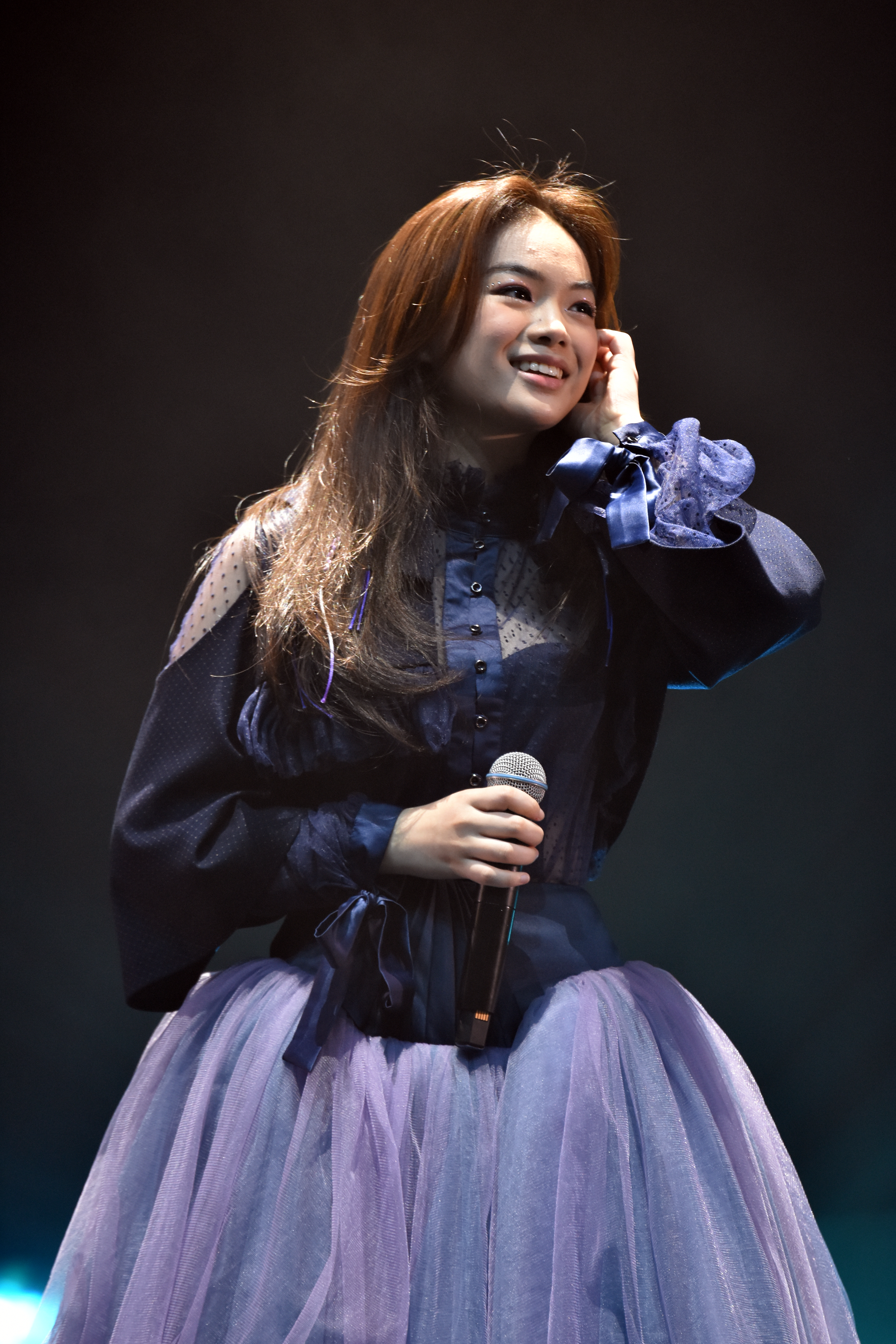
Jasmine Yam (2022)

=== Season 1 (2021) ===
The inaugural season of the show premiered from April to July 2021, featuring 15 contestants ranging in age from 14 to 26. Coaches included AGA, Pakho Chau, Vincy Chan, JW, Gin Lee, Hacken Lee, and Janice Vidal. The top five finalists included Gigi Yim, Chantel Yiu, Yumi Chung, Archie Sin, and Rock Ho. Ultimately, Gigi Yim won the crown, with Chantel Yiu as the runner-up on 19 July 2021. Throughout the competition, several performances gained popularity, including Gigi Yim's rendition of "Without You, I Still Love You" (沒有你還是愛你), Chantel Yiu's "Love Prediction" (戀愛預告), and Yumi Chung's "Wild City" (狂野之城). The finale had an average viewership of 1.57 million. The first season contestants signed a record deal with TVB Music Group (formerly Voice Entertainment), which launched a sublabel called All About Music dedicated to releasing their musical works. The top five contestants were the first to release their solo debuts. Additionally, All About Music formed the girl group After Class, consisting of Gigi Yim, Chantel Yiu, Yumi Chung, and Windy Zhan. After the competition, the contestants had the opportunity to perform in front of a live audience at their graduated live concert First Live on Stage (2021) and later starred in the musical television series Forever Young at Heart (2021—2022).

=== Season 2 (2022) ===
The second season aired from June to October 2022, featuring a total of 23 contestants, including 17 individuals and a 6-membered girl group, with ages ranging from 13 to 29. The show featured Eric Kwok, Eman Lam, Phil Lam, Alan Po, Hanjin Tan, along with the return of Vincy Chan, JW, and Gin Lee as coaches. The top five finalists were Jasmine Yam, Janees Wong, Sabrina Chiu, Pamela Chiu, and the girl group XiX. On 2 October 2022, Jasmine Yam was crowned the winner, while Janees Wong took the runner-up position. Throughout the season, Yam was deemed one of the most popular contestants among the viewers. The finale reached a peak viewership of 1.16 million. Gin Lee, in her coaching role, was noted as the key figure in guiding both Gigi Yim and Jasmine Yam to their winning titles in their respective seasons. Following the competition, the contestants performed at their graduated live concert Prom Night (2022). In September 2023, the girl group XiX, having signed a record deal with Universal Music Hong Kong, became the first finalists to make their official debut. (Note: Originally a 6-membered group, member Aster Lau left in May 2023 to pursue a solo career under All About Music.)

== Related show ==
Stars Junior Academy (Chinese: 聲夢Junior) is a 4-episode TV programme broadcast from 27 February to 27 March 2022. The show documented the training and elimination journey of eighteen contestants aged 11–15, with the final four earning the opportunity to join the second season of Stars Academy. The programme featured Eric Kwok as the guiding director accompanied by various other established singers. Several first season contestants of Stars Academy made appearances as coaching assistants. Caitlin Yang, Crystal Leung, Charlotte Mow, and Kiele Tang were announced as the winners. Later, it was revealed that two eliminated contestants, Aster Lau and Vici Chong, would join the original four winners to form a 6-membered girl group named XiX, who would compete together.
