= Gigi Yim =

Hong Kong singer

- 炎明熹
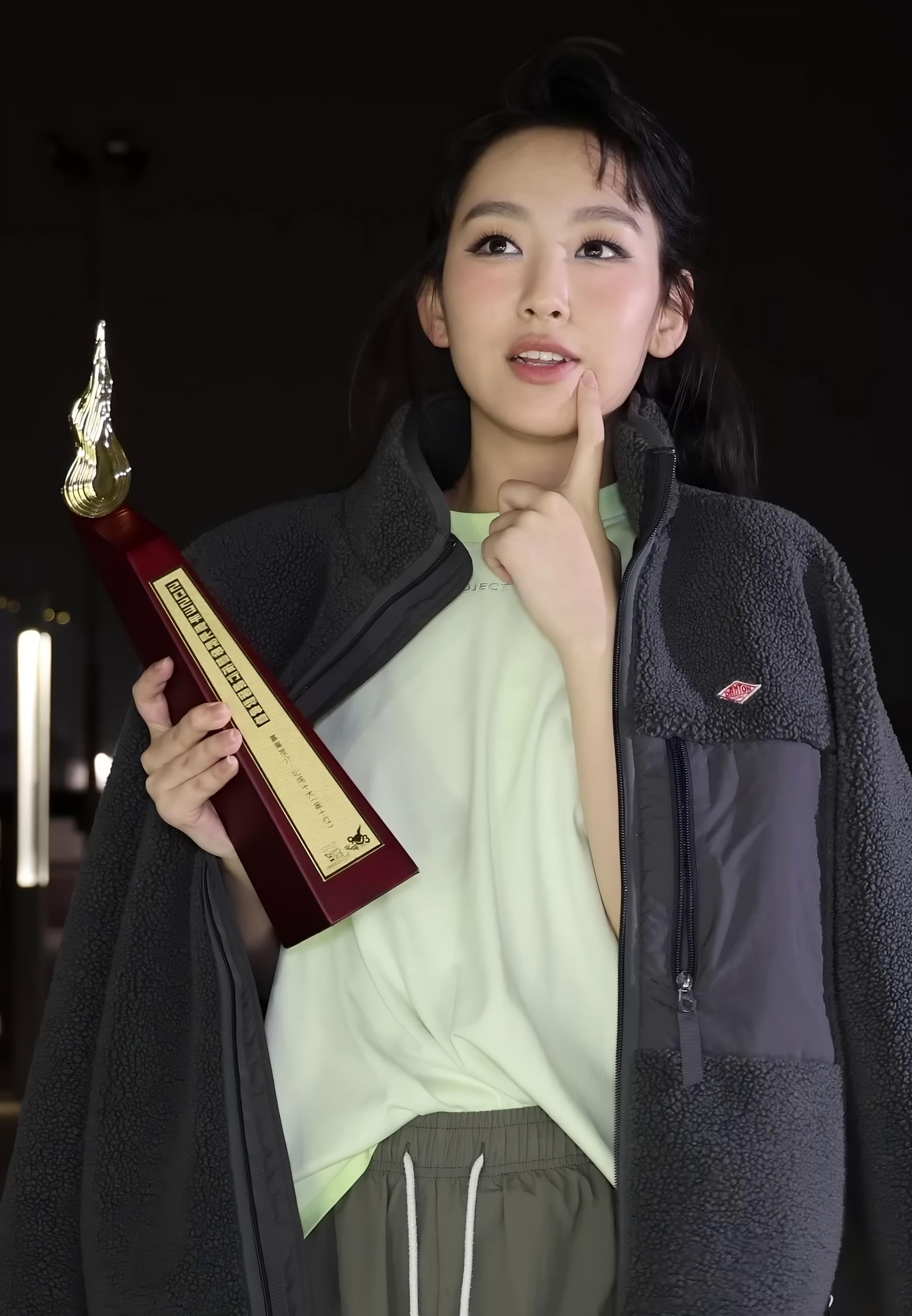
- Yim attending an event for Ultimate Song Chart Awards Presentation 2023 on 1 January 2024.
- Born: Wang Kai-yan (王佳恩); 9 April 2005 (age 21); Hong Kong
- Education: St. Antonius Girls' College
- Occupations: Singer; actress
- Agent: TVB (2021–2025)
- Musical career
- Genres: Cantopop; Mandopop
- Instruments: Vocals; guitar; piano
- Years active: 2021–present
- Labels: All About Music (2021–2025); Sony Music (2026-present)
- Formerly of: After Class

Chinese name
- Chinese: 炎明熹
Transcriptions
Standard Mandarin
- Hanyu Pinyin: Yán Míngxī
- Bopomofo: ㄧㄢˊ ㄇㄧㄥˊ ㄒㄧ
Yue: Cantonese
- Jyutping: jim^{4} ming^{4} hei^{1}
- IPA: [jim˩ mɪŋ˩ hej˥]

Birth name
- Chinese: 王佳恩
Transcriptions
Standard Mandarin
- Hanyu Pinyin: Wáng Jiā'ēn
- Bopomofo: ㄨㄤˊ ㄐㄧㄚ ㄣ
Yue: Cantonese
- Jyutping: wong^{4} gaai^{1} jan^{1}
- IPA: [wɔŋ˩ kaj˥ jɐn˥]

Gigi Wang Lung-hay (Chinese: 王爖熹, [wɔŋ˩ lʊŋ˩ hej˥]; born 9 April 2005), commonly known as her stage name Gigi Yim Ming-hay (Chinese: 炎明熹, [jim˩ mɪŋ˩ hej˥]), is a Hong Kong singer and actress, and was a former member of the Hong Kong girl group After Class. She is noted for winning TVB's reality talent competition Stars Academy in 2021. Yim made her solo debut in September 2021 with the single "Noble Truth" (真話的清高).

== Early life ==
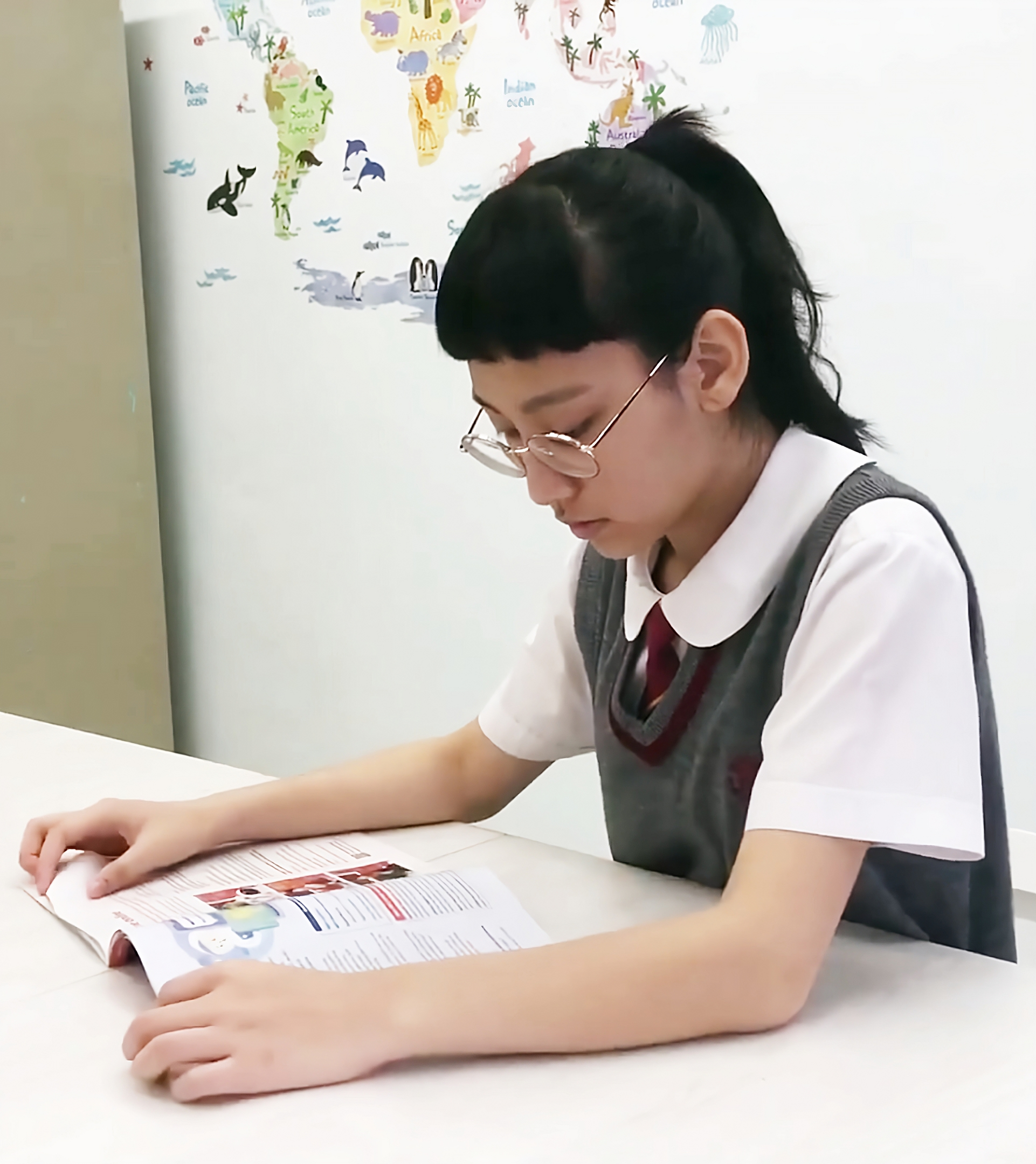
Yim was studying in the St. Antonius Girls' College

Yim was born Wang Kai-yan, later changed to Wong Lung-hay, in Hong Kong on 9 April 2005, being the eldest of three siblings. With both parents being Mainland Chinese, she grew up with her parental aunt and uncle in Hong Kong and attends St. Antonius Girls' College. She has been keen on singing since her childhood and is influenced by Chinese reality singing competition The Voice of China. As her uncle discovered her singing talent, he encouraged her to keep learning, subsequently she began training in a music academy, and participating in different kinds of talent shows and competitions.

== Music career ==
Yim became one of the contestants of TVB's reality talent competition Stars Academy in 2021, and her performance of Sandy Lam's "Without You, But Still Love You" (沒有你還是愛你, which itself is a Cantonese cover version of Beverley Craven's "Promise Me") in the competition gained her popularity.

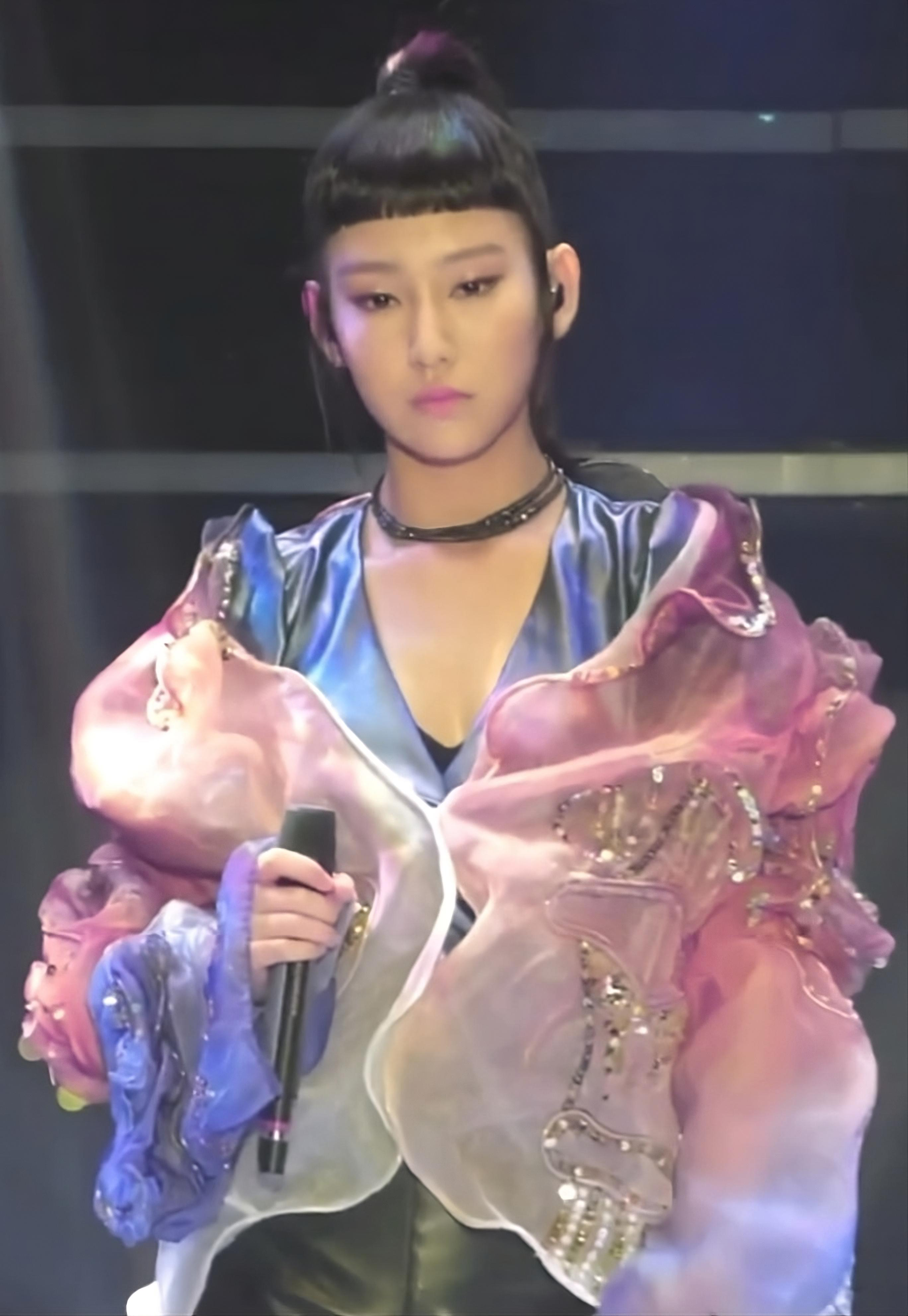
Yim performed at her live concert 'First Live On Stage' at the Macpherson Stadium on 12 August 2021.

After winning the competition, she debuted in September 2021 with the single "Noble Truth". In November, Yim, along with Chantel Yiu, Windy Zhan and Yumi Chung, formed a girl group called "After Class", with their debut single "Present For Future" (要為今日回憶). She also released another single "Love is Beauty with a Flaw" (愛是帶種缺陷的美) collaborated with Hubert Wu in 2021. She then received rookie awards in 2021 Metro Radio Music Awards, Ultimate Song Chart Awards Presentation 2021 and Hong Kong Gold Songs Award Presentation Ceremony 2021/2022 on 27 December 2021, 1 January 2022 and 24 July 2022, respectively.

In 2022, she released five other singles, namely "It's Complicated" (複雜), "One Water Two Ways" (一水兩方), "Most Concerned About" (最牽掛的), "Flame" (焰) and "Wanna Date You" (好想約你). She also participated in the reality singing competition Infinity and Beyond (声生不息; 聲生不息) organised by TVB and Hunan Television. She was then awarded Metro Radio Hits Music Awards 2022 by the single "Flame".

== Acting career ==
Yim made her acting debut on the TVB television series Forever Young At Heart, which she was nominated for the category of Most Improved Female Artiste at TVB Awards Presentation 2022.

== Discography ==
=== Singles ===
==== As lead artist ====
Title	Year	Peak chart positions	Album
Title	Year	HK	Album
"Noble Truth" (真話的清高)	2021	—	Non-album singles
"It's Complicated" (複雜)	2022	—	Non-album singles
"One Water Two Ways" (一水兩方)	2022	—	Non-album singles
"Most Concerned About" (最牽掛的)	2022	—	Non-album singles
"Flame" (焰)	2022	—	Non-album singles
"Wanna Date You" (好想約你)	2022	—	Non-album singles
"Crystal Clear" (劇集)	2023	—	Non-album singles

==== Collaborations ====
Title	Chinese Title	Year	Notes
"Imperfect Love" (with Hubert Wu)	愛是帶種缺陷的美	2021	
"Wings" (with Albert Chau, Michelle Siu)	翅膀	2024	

== Filmography ==
=== Television series ===
Year	Title	Original Title	Role	Notes
2021	Forever Young At Heart	青春本我	Ho Chin-chin (Gigi)	
2023	Come Home Love: Lo And Behold	愛·回家之開心速遞	Herself	
2024	/	戀上西沙	Gigi	Short TV Series Produced by TVB in Collaboration with SHK

== Concerts ==
- Gigi Yim Gi-FORCE Concert (2023)
