= Jace Chan =

Hong Kong singer (born 1994)

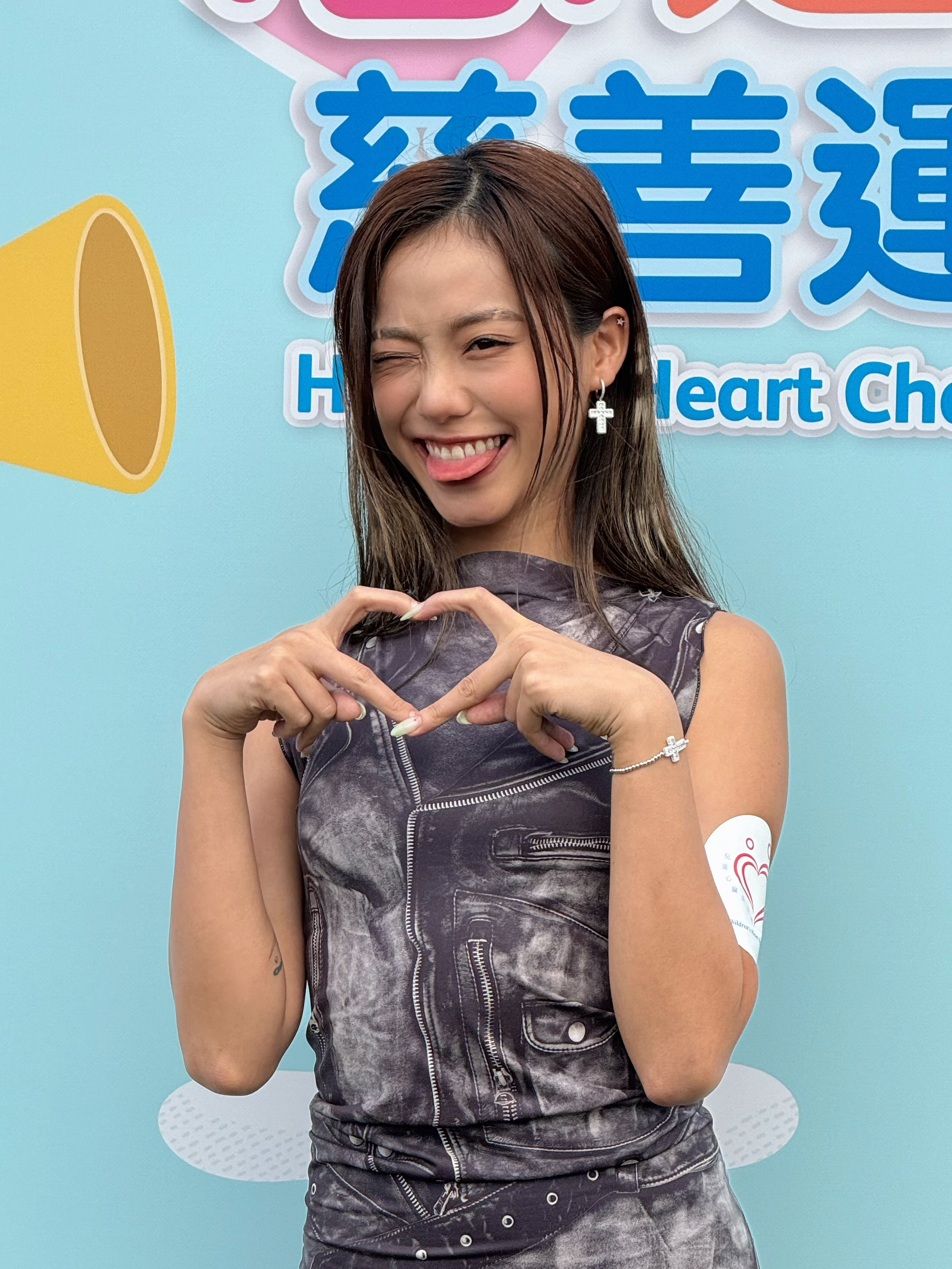
- Chan at Heart-to-Heart Charity Sports Day 2023
- Born: Chan Hoi Wing; 11 March 1994 (age 32); British Hong Kong
- Education: Hong Kong Baptist University – Bachelor's Degree
- Occupations: Singer; actress
- Years active: 2017–present
- Notable work: "天生二品"

Jace Chan Hoi Wing (Chinese: 陳凱詠; pinyin: chén kǎiyǒng; Cantonese Yale: chàn hóiwihng) is a Hong Kong singer and actress. She debuted in the music industry in 2019 and won Metro Radio's New Artist Award. Her song "Quarantine" (Chinese: 隔離) won her an additional award.

Her acting debut was a supporting role in the 2017 TV series Margaret & David - Ex (Chinese: 瑪嘉烈與大衛系列 前度) made by ViuTV.

== Early life ==
Chan was born and raised in Hong Kong.

Chan graduated from Hong Kong Baptist University, where she studied public relations and advertising, in 2016.

== Career ==
After graduation, Chan worked at Universal Music Hong Kong as an on-screen host for UM Webzine, its online entertainment channel, for two years. In addition to that, she has also worked as a dance teacher and a stylist on Good Night Show - King Maker. At this time, she began busking and performing with the Hong Kong band Dusty Bottle. She later signed with music label Universal Music in 2018.

In 2019, she became one of the "Fabulous Four", becoming the new singer of that year. She released 3 songs that year: Sudden Urge (Chinese: 想突然), a R&B song featuring LMF and 24Herbs, Trying for Normalcy (Chinese: 想正常), a heavier song, describing the conflicts in later stages of a relationship, and Speak (Chinese: 講) whose demo was recorded in Paris.

In 2020, Chan collaborated with Alex Fung to compose the melody of the song Born to be in Second Place (Chinese: 天生二品) alongside Hirsk, a Hong Kong Composer. The song was a success, managing to get to the top of the Music Charts of ViuTV, Commercial Radio, Metro Radio and RTHK. In that August, she released a love song, Quarantine (Chinese: "隔離"), collaborating with Alex Fung again. Chan's friends, Z. Koo and Chung Suet Ying were the main actors in the music video. The song was another success, topping the charts on iTunes, MusicOne, and KKBOX. This song also became one of the 10 best songs recommended by Metro Radio. A duet version with the indie singer Terence Lam was also made.

In 2021, Chan reused the crew and invited Terence Lam to be a co-composer of the song The Virtual Man & ME (Chinese: 虛擬人與我), a song about an online relationship. She released her first album, Processing, on May 14, 2021, and the album reached the golden award sales (15,000 copies sold) on its first day out. Songs from the album were listened to approximately 2 million times on MOOV. The album contained all Chan's previous songs as well as a new song, "I Wish," which expressed Chan's hope for relieving stress and doing things her audience likes without being restricted. It became the top song on the charts of RTHK, Commercial Radio, TVB and ViuTV. Chan has also invited the vocal of bands Chochukmo and R.O.O.T, Jan Curious to record a Poolside Version. In July, Chan was chosen by Spotify to be the Hong Kong representative for their July EQUAL Global Music Program and her portrait was on the screen of New York Times Square. On August 20, Chan held her first concert under the sponsorship of American Express, though the way its tickets were sold led to disputes in the music community.

In 2022 Chan released a R&B song "Long D" composed by Jay Fung and reenacted many classic old Hong Kong movie scenes in its music video. She sung in 21 shows of the musical Bye-Bye Your Tale in August that year.

In early 2023, Chan was dropped by her label, Universal Music Group, over conflicting values. After her contracts expired, she independently released her five-song EP, Hatchling, in October 2023. All the songs on the EP were written by Chan, unlike her previous projects.

In 2024, she co-headlined the Moov Live and 903 Music is Live concerts and made a guest performance at Sammi Cheng's concert at the Hong Kong Coliseum. At the 2024 Ultimate Song Chart Awards Presentation, Chan won the Silver Prize for Best Female Singer and "I'm Tired" was awarded second place in the Top 10 Songs of the Year.

== Discography ==
=== Albums ===
Order	Album name	Album type	Publishing firm	Release date	Songs
1	Processing	Album	Universal Music Hong Kong	14 May 2021	CD1: 1. "想突然" Feat. Phat; 2. "想正常"; 3. "講"; 4. "天生二品"; 5. "Quarantine"; 6. "Quarantine (Studio Live Duet)" Feat. Terence Lam; 7. "虛擬人與我"; 8. "I Wish"; CD2: 1. "Forever Summer" (English); 2. "Feel Me (想正常Demo)"; 3. "困獸鬥" (feat.FatBoy@ERROR) Theme song for ViuTV drama Showman's Show; 4. "Cold (講 Demo)" (English); 5. "天生二品 (2 Drummers Version)" feat. Anton & Kay; 6. "DOITDOIT (半個鍾說Demo)"; 7. "想突然 (hirsk Remix)"; 8. "困獸鬥 (TonYnoT Remix)"; 9. "虛擬人與我 (Yeung Tung Remix)"; 10. "I Wish (Mael Remix)"
2	Revolving	Album	Jace World	22 Aug 2025 (REVOLVING: UP); 12 Dec 2025 (REVOLVING: DOWN)	CD1 - REVOLVING: UP: 1. INTRO; 2. "Freaks Night Parade" (百妖夜行的修行) (2024); 3. "BIG CARS" (大車) (2025); 4. "SWITCH" (蛻) (2025); 5. "Oops" (出事) (2025); 6. "Xihu" feat. Novel Fergus (西湖) (2025); 7. "Pamper Ü" (我養你) (2024); 8. "5am Percepts" (五時戒) (2025); CD2 - REVOLVING: DOWN: 1. INTERLUDE; 2. "I'm Tired" (間歇性休眠) (2024); 3. "Slowly In Love" (慢慢活) (2025); 4. "Hold Me Tight" (蟠) (2025); 5. "PTSD" (會痊癒的) (2025); 6. "Immaculate" (清白之身) (2025); 7. "Loud & Proud" (是那麼聲勢浩大) (2025); 8. "Huggies" (那黑夜沒很夜) (2024)

=== Extended plays ===
Title	Album details	Tracklisting	Ref.
Hatching	Released: 16 October 2023; Label: Jace.World; Formats: Cassette, digital download and streaming	1. Byebye 掰掰歌; 2. Lo Siento 各行各路; 3. Calm Down 練功; 4. Earthly Fairy 見聞覺知; 5. Sigue Haciendo 時機已到 (feat. Chung Suet Ying)	

=== Singles ===
- "Yours Hatefully" (沒有無緣無故的恨) (2021)
- "Shuuu" (收聲多謝) (2021)
- "Long D" (2022)

=== Collaborations ===
- 2018: "Forever Summer" (English song of the Hong Kong band Dusty Bottle, also the lyricist for the song)
- 2019: "困獸鬥" (Theme song for ViuTV drama Showman's Show, featuring FatBoy of Error)
- 2020: "Last Seen!" (Theme song for Commercial Radio program Medication for Insomnia and the music in another program, Last Seen!. featuring OSCAR, Yanny Chan and Anson Kong)
- 2020: "隔離" (lit: Quarantine) (Studio Live Duet) (with Terence Lam)
- 2021: "Before 30" (Theme song for Commercial Radio program Medication for Insomnia and the music in another program, Last Seen! Season 5. featuring OSCAR, Yanny Chan, Anson Kong and Kaho Hung)
- 2022: "This Is How We Roll" (Featuring in P1X3L's song)
- 2024: "Gradually" (漸漸我們) (with Edan Lui)

=== Other songs ===
- 2018: "I'll be You" (Promotional music for Universal Music Hong Kong, appearing as the anchor of UMwebzine in the music video)
- 2018: "Summer Thing" (Personal creation)
- 2019: "Chung Full Hustle" (Theme song for Commercial Radio program Chung Full Hustle, also the composer of the song)

Songs Chart on Billboard, Hits of the World and Hong Kong Songs

Year	Title	Peak chart positions	Weeks on Chart
2022	"Ge Li (隔離)" with Terence Lam	13	26
2022	"Long D"	23	1

== Filmography ==
=== Drama ===
Year	Title	Role	Network	Note
2019	Showman's Show	Ngai Pui Lam / "Lam Lam"	ViuTV	

=== TV shows ===
Year	Title	Network
2021	All Suspicious	ViuTV
2021	Dance for Life	TVB

=== Educational TV shows ===
Year	Title	Network
2017	Primary 5 Maths - Volume (1)	ETV
2017	Primary 6 Maths - Volume (2)	ETV

== Videography ==
=== Music videos ===
Year	Title	Artist(s)	Director(s)	Choreographer(s)
2018	"Forever Summer"	Dusty Bottle, Vocal & Lyrics: Jace Chan	Travis Ho	—N/a
2019	"Sudden Thought"	Jace Chan Featuring Phat	Travis Ho	—N/a
2019	"Want to Be Normal"	Jace Chan	Travis Ho	Danie Chan
2019	"Speak"	Jace Chan	Kinlong Chan	
2020	"Born to Be Different"	Jace Chan	Pixel Ivan	—N/a
2020	"Quarantine"	Jace Chan	Wong Kwun Bun	—N/a
2021	"Virtual Human & I"	Jace Chan	Kim Lee	—N/a
2021	"I Wish"	Jace Chan	Kinlong Chan	Danie Chan
2021	"I Wish (Poolside Version)"	Jace Chan Featuring Jan Curious		—N/a
2021	"Making the Rules"	Jace Chan	Kim Lee	Oceann Kenken
2022	"Long D"	Jace Chan	Kendra Koh	—N/a
2022	"This Is How We Roll"	P1X3L Featuring Jace Chan	Suzanne Lai	Rock Fang, Lok Au
2023	"Calm Down"	Jace Chan	Travis Good	—N/a
2024	"Freaks Night Parade"	Jace Chan	Kvnloverboy	
2024	"I'm Tired"	Jace Chan	Elaine Lam	—N/a
2024	"Gradually"	Edan Lui and Jace Chan	Kwokin	—N/a

== Concerts ==
=== Solo ===
Date	Name	Venue	Notes
14 May 2021	MOOV Special - Jace Chan	West Kowloon Cultural District Freespace	Sharing of her new album, Processing
20 August 2021	Presented by American Express - Jace Chan PROCESSED Concert	KITEC E-Max Music Zone	First personal concert
11–12 December 2021	Presented by FWD - Jace Chan UNBORDERED Live	KITEC E-Max Star Hall	First personal concert with open ticket offices
17 June 2022	MUSICATION - Jace Chan	-	Online concert

=== Collaborations ===
Date	Name	Venue	Notes
20 October 2021	CHILL CLUB: The New Vibes	KITEC E-Max Star Hall	Cooperation with ERROR, Yoyo Sham and Joyce Cheng
12 November 2021	Tiffany & Co. T1 Concert	Harbour City	Cooperation with Terence Lam, Charmaine Fong and Tyson Yoshi
8 August 2022	YSL Beauty Zone Music Live	West Kowloon Cultural District Freespace	Cooperation with MC Cheung
19 January 2024	MOOV Live JAY x JACE	HKCEC Hall 5BC	Cooperation with Jay Fung
22 June 2024	Music is Live sparkle EDAN x JACE x JEFFREY x MARF	AsiaWorld–Expo Arena	Cooperation with Edan Lui, Jeffrey Ngai, Marife Yau
18 January 2025	FOUR in LOVE CHARITY LIVE 2025	Kai Tak Stadium	Cooperation with Jay Fung, Cloud Wan, Dear Jane

=== Performances and guest appearances ===
Date	Name	Venue	Notes
4 July 2022	Jay Fung Have a JAY Time 2022	KITEC E-Max Star Hall	Guest appearance
19-26 August 2022	Terence Lam - SUMMER BLUES Live	Hong Kong Coliseum	Video recorded duet with Terence Lam
29 November 2023	Lolly Talk Little Things Concert 2023	KITEC E-Max Star Hall	Guest appearance
15 May 2024	WHO IS YAN TING LIVE 2024	KITEC E-Max Star Hall	Guest appearance
30 June 2024	TheNextwave XX24 Beach Music Festival	Tai Pak Beach, Discovery Bay	
16 July 2024	You & Mi Sammi Cheng World Tour	Hong Kong Coliseum	Guest appearance
8 March 2025	The Singleton: Just Sing. Live in Wonderland	West Kowloon Cultural District	
23 March 2025	ComplexCon Hong Kong 2025	AsiaWorld–Expo Arena	

== Awards and nominations ==
=== Music awards ===
Year	Award ceremony	Platform	Venue	Category	Work	Result	Criteria
2019	Metro Radio Music Awards	Metro Broadcast Corporation	Metro Broadcast Office	New Artist Awards	-	Won	
2020	Metro Radio Music Awards	Metro Broadcast Corporation	Tung Luen Industrial Building, Kwai Chung	Top 10 Songs	"隔離" (Ge Li / Quarantine)	Won	
2021	Chill Club Awards 20/21	ViuTV	Star Hall, KITEC	Top 10 Songs	"天生二品" (Born to Be Different)	Won	From online voting
2021	Ultimate Song Chart Awards Presentation	Commercial Radio Hong Kong	Arena, AsiaWorld–Expo	My Favourite Female Singer	-	Final 5	From online voting
2022	Ultimate Song Chart Awards Presentation	Commercial Radio Hong Kong	Arena, AsiaWorld–Expo	My Favourite Female Singer	-	Final 5	From online voting
2024	Ultimate Song Chart Awards Presentation	Commercial Radio Hong Kong	Arena, AsiaWorld–Expo	My Favourite Female Singer	-	Final 5	From online voting
2024	Ultimate Song Chart Awards Presentation	Commercial Radio Hong Kong	Arena, AsiaWorld–Expo	Best Female Singer	-	Silver Prize	
2024	Chill Club Awards 24/25	ViuTV	Kai Tak Arena	Female Singers of the Year	-	Bronze Prize	From online voting
