= Ultimate Song Chart Awards Presentation 2022 =

2022 edition of an award ceremony

- Date: 1 January 2023
- Location: AsiaWorld–Expo, Hong Kong
- Hosted by: Commercial Radio
- Website: Ultimate Song Chart Awards Presentation 2022

Television/radio coverage
- Network: ViuTV, Commercial Radio Hong Kong

The Ultimate Song Chart Awards Presentation 2022 (Chinese: 2022年度叱咤樂壇流行榜頒獎典禮) was held at AsiaWorld–Expo, Arena on 1 January 2023.

== Winners ==
Category	Artiste(s)	Work	Ref.
Top 10 Songs of the Year	Terence Lam	"Who Invented the Encore" (邊一個發明了ENCORE)	
Top 10 Songs of the Year	MC Cheung	"Caution Wet Floor"	
Top 10 Songs of the Year	Dear Jane	"What Happened"	
Top 10 Songs of the Year	Keung To	"Spiegel Im Spiegel (Mirror in Mirror)" (鏡中鏡)	
Top 10 Songs of the Year	Kay Tse	"Life Just Goes On" (憶年)	
Top 10 Songs of the Year	Panther Chan	"Underworld"	
Top 10 Songs of the Year	Ian Chan	"Breathing With You" (留一天與你喘息)	
Top 10 Songs of the Year	Gareth. T	"Happy Tears"	
Top 10 Songs of the Year	Wilson Ng, Chintung Tse	"I'm Sad Too" (我也難過的)	
Top 10 Songs of the Year	Jay Fung	"Freakin' Nightmare"	
Album of the Year	Terence Lam	"MEMENTO"	
Ultimate Male Singers	Terence Lam (gold)		
Ultimate Male Singers	Jay Fung (silver)		
Ultimate Male Singers	MC Cheung (bronze)		
Ultimate Female Singers	Joyce Cheng (gold)		
Ultimate Female Singers	Vincy Chan (silver)		
Ultimate Female Singers	Cath Wong (bronze)		
Ultimate Groups	MIRROR (gold)		
Ultimate Groups	Dear Jane (silver)		
Ultimate Groups	COLLAR (bronze)		
Ultimate Male Newcomers	Jeremy Lee (gold)		
Ultimate Male Newcomers	Chase Chan (silver)		
Ultimate Male Newcomers	Dark Wong (bronze)		
Ultimate Female Newcomers	Cloud Wan (gold)		
Ultimate Female Newcomers	Sabrina Cheung (silver)		
Ultimate Female Newcomers	Kayan9896 (bronze)		
Ultimate New Groups	COLLAR (gold)		
Ultimate New Groups	Lolly Talk (silver)		
Ultimate New Groups	STRAYZ (bronze)		
Ultimate Singer-songwriters	Terence Lam (gold)		
Ultimate Singer-songwriters	Jay Fung (silver)		
Ultimate Singer-songwriters	Ian Chan (bronze)		
Ultimate Songwriter	Gareth.T		
Ultimate Lyricist	Wyman Wong		
Ultimate Music Producer	T-Ma		
Ultimate Music Arranger	Carl Wong		
Audience's Favourite Male Singer	Anson Lo		
Audience's Favourite Female Singer	Joyce Cheng		
Audience's Favourite Group	MIRROR		
Audience's Favourite Song	Keung To	"What The Work Says" (作品的說話)	

== Performances ==
Artiste(s)	Songs	Ref.
COLLAR, Kiri T, Lolly Talk & Kayan9896	"Call My Name!", "Twist Cone", "Triple Sweetness", "Not Too Close"	
Anson Kong, Wilson Ng, Jeremy Lee, Kaho Hung & Jeffrey Ngai	"Sin No Maki" (信之卷), "I'm Sad Too" (我也難過的), "Apollo" (阿波羅), "Dirty", "The First Fan" (第一個迷) &"doodoodoo"	
