= Ultimate Song Chart Awards Presentation 2021 =

2021 edition of an award ceremony

- Date: 1 January 2022
- Location: AsiaWorld–Expo, Hong Kong
- Hosted by: Commercial Radio
- Website: Ultimate Song Chart Awards Presentation 2021

Television/radio coverage
- Network: ViuTV

The Ultimate Song Chart Awards Presentation 2021 (Chinese: 2021年度叱咤樂壇流行榜頒獎典禮) was held at the AsiaWorld–Expo on 1 January 2022. It recognized the best Cantopop recordings, compositions, and artistes of the eligibility year.

== Winners ==
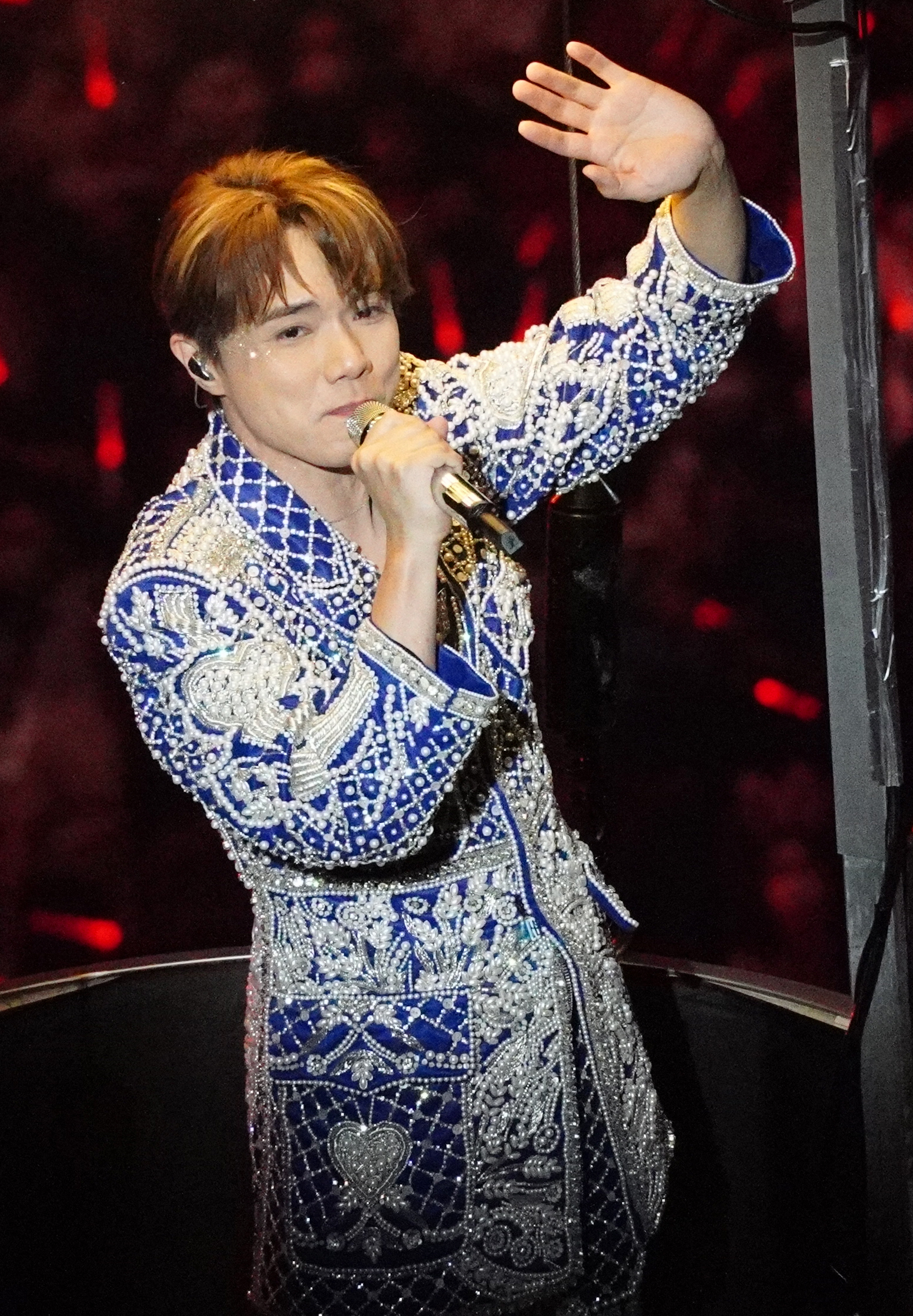
Hins Cheung won "Best Male Singer" award.

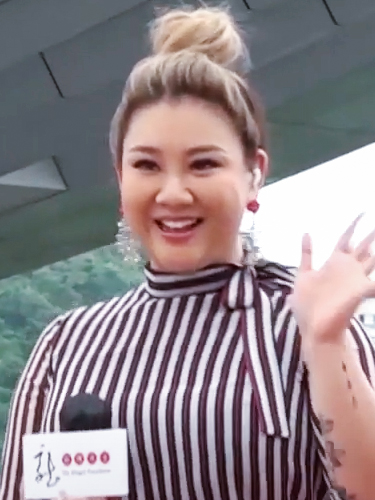
Joyce Cheng won "Best Female Singer" award.

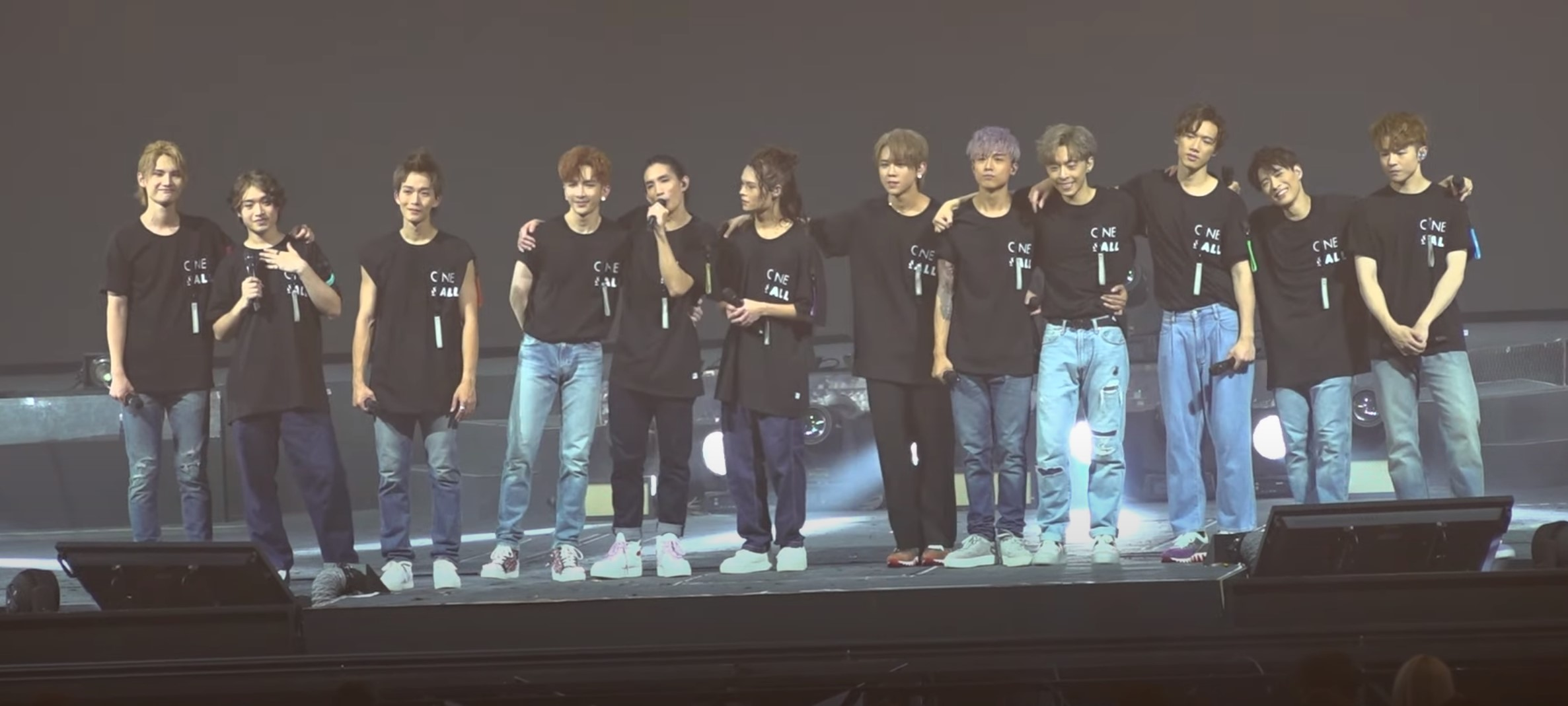
Mirror, as group and individuals, won eight awards.

Category	Artiste(s)	Work	Ref.
Top 10 Songs of the Year	RubberBand	"CIAO"	
Top 10 Songs of the Year	Mirror	"BOSS"	
Top 10 Songs of the Year	Hins Cheung	"What Separates Us/The Way We Were" (俏郎君)	
Top 10 Songs of the Year	Stephanie Cheng	"Drink More Water" (多喝水)	
Top 10 Songs of the Year	Terence Lam	"Magical Random Potion" (神奇的糊塗魔藥)	
Top 10 Songs of the Year	Jer Lau	"Diary of a Madman" (狂人日記)	
Top 10 Songs of the Year	C AllStar	"Together We Strive For A Better World" (集合吧! 地球保衛隊)	
Top 10 Songs of the Year	Yoyo Sham	"Come What May" (風的形狀)	
Top 10 Songs of the Year	Anson Lo	"Megahit"	
Top 10 Songs of the Year	Vincy Chan	"Sea Of Thorns" (荊棘海)	
Album of the Year	Hins Cheung	The Brightest Darkness	
Ultimate Male Singers	Hins Cheung (gold)		
Ultimate Male Singers	Terence Lam (silver)		
Ultimate Male Singers	Jay Fung (bronze)		
Ultimate Female Singers	Joyce Cheng (gold)		
Ultimate Female Singers	Cath Wong (silver)		
Ultimate Female Singers	Mag Lam (bronze)		
Ultimate Groups	C AllStar (gold)		
Ultimate Groups	Mirror (silver)		
Ultimate Groups	Dear Jane (bronze)		
Ultimate Male Newcomers	MC Cheung (gold)		
Ultimate Male Newcomers	Edan Lui (silver)		
Ultimate Male Newcomers	Mike Tsang (bronze)		
Ultimate Female Newcomers	Gigi Cheung (gold)		
Ultimate Female Newcomers	Gigi Yim (silver)		
Ultimate Female Newcomers	Chantel Yiu (bronze)		
Ultimate New Groups	Rock Hill Street (gold)		
Ultimate New Groups	MC $oHo & KidNey (silver)		
Ultimate New Groups	P1X3L (bronze)		
Ultimate Singer-songwriters	Terence Lam (gold)		
Ultimate Singer-songwriters	Jay Fung (silver)		
Ultimate Singer-songwriters	Phil Lam (bronze)		
Ultimate Songwriter	Terence Lam		
Ultimate Lyricist	Wyman Wong		
Ultimate Music Producer	Edward Chan		
Ultimate Music Arranger	Terence Lam		
Audience's Favourite Male Singer	Keung To		
Audience's Favourite Female Singer	Joyce Cheng		
Audience's Favourite Group	Mirror		
Audience's Favourite Song	Keung To	"Dear My Friend"	
