= Hong Kong Gold Songs Award Presentation Ceremony 2021/2022 =

2021–2022 edition of an award ceremony

- Date: 24 July 2022
- Location: TVB Studio, Hong Kong
- Hosted by: TVB & RTHK
- Website: Hong Kong Gold Songs Award Presentation Ceremony 2021/2022

Television/radio coverage
- Network: TVB

The Hong Kong Gold Songs Award Presentation Ceremony 2021/2022 (Chinese: 香港金曲頒獎典禮 2021/2022) was held on 24 July 2022. Hosted by TVB and RTHK jointly, it recognized the best Cantopop recordings, compositions, and artistes of the eligibility year.

== Background ==
The Hong Kong Gold Songs Award Presentation Ceremony 2021/2022 was originally two separate events: the Top Ten Chinese Songs Music Awards held by Radio Television Hong Kong (RTHK) since 1979, and the Jade Solid Gold Best Ten Music Awards Presentation held by TVB since 1984. On January 5, 2022, RTHK and TVB jointly held a press conference to announce the merger of the two ceremonies. The award show was initially scheduled to take place on April 3, 2022, at Kowloonbay International Trade & Exhibition Centre. However, due to the COVID-19 pandemic, it was rescheduled to July 24, 2022, at the TVB City. This awards ceremony marked the first time in the history of Hong Kong's pop music that two major electronic media organizations collaborated to host a music awards ceremony, with TVB inviting RTHK to co-organize the event. The awards winners were determined through public opinion surveys conducted by independent agencies, online voting by citizens, and votes from music professionals.

== Winners ==
Category	Artiste(s)	Work	Ref.
Top 10 Gold Song Awards	Joyce Cheng	"First Tear Last Salute" (先哭為敬)	
Top 10 Gold Song Awards	Gigi Yim	"Noble Truth" (真話的清高)	
Top 10 Gold Song Awards	Mike Tsang	"I'm Not As Good" (我不如)	
Top 10 Gold Song Awards	Edan Lui	"Mr. E's Series of Unfortunate Events" (E先生連環不幸事件)	
Top 10 Gold Song Awards	Hins Cheung	"What Separates Us/The Way We Were" (俏郎君)	
Top 10 Gold Song Awards	Vincy Chan	"Sea of Thorns" (荊棘海)	
Top 10 Gold Song Awards	MC	"Pillow Talk" (記憶棉)	
Top 10 Gold Song Awards	AGA	"City Pop"	
Top 10 Gold Song Awards	Janice Vidal	"It's OK To Be Sad"	
Top 10 Gold Song Awards	Chantel Yiu	"So, This Is Love" (原來談戀愛是這麼一回事)	
Best Male Singer Award	Hins Cheung		
Best Female Singer Award	Joyce Cheng		
Best Group Award	Supper Moment		
Best Singer-songwriter Awards	Jay Fung (gold)		
Best Singer-songwriter Awards	Phil Lam (silver)		
Best Singer-songwriter Awards	Mischa Ip (bronze)		
Best Male Newcomer Awards	Mike Tsang (gold)		
Best Male Newcomer Awards	MC (silver)		
Best Male Newcomer Awards	ANSONBEAN (bronze)		
Best Female Newcomer Awards	Gigi Yim (gold)		
Best Female Newcomer Awards	Chantel Yiu (silver)		
Best Female Newcomer Awards	Gigi Cheung (bronze)		
Most Improved Artists of the Year	Mischa Ip (gold)		
Most Improved Artists of the Year	Kako Hung (silver)		
Most Improved Artists of the Year	Zaina Sze (bronze)		
Best TV Series Theme Songs	JW	"I Don't Want To Leave" (我不想別離) (gold)	
Best TV Series Theme Songs	Kayee Tam	"Never Happening" (不可能發生) (silver)	
Best TV Series Theme Songs	Gin Lee & Michelle Siu	"This Kind Of Love" (這種親) (bronze)	
Best Album Awards	Hins Cheung	The Brightest Darkness	
Best Album Awards	Hana Kuk	Can't Let You Go (不能放手)	
Best Album Awards	MIRROR	One and All	
Best Group Song	MIRROR	"BOSS"	
Best Mandarin Song Award	Vivian Koo	"Stubborn" (倔強)	
Gold Melody Song Award	Jacky Cheung & Gin Lee	"When The Sun Rises" (日出時讓街燈安睡)	

== Viewership ==
The show achieved a 19.1 rating points, which translates to 1.24 million viewers.
