= Kiri T =

Hong Kong singer-songwriter

Kiri T 謝曉盈
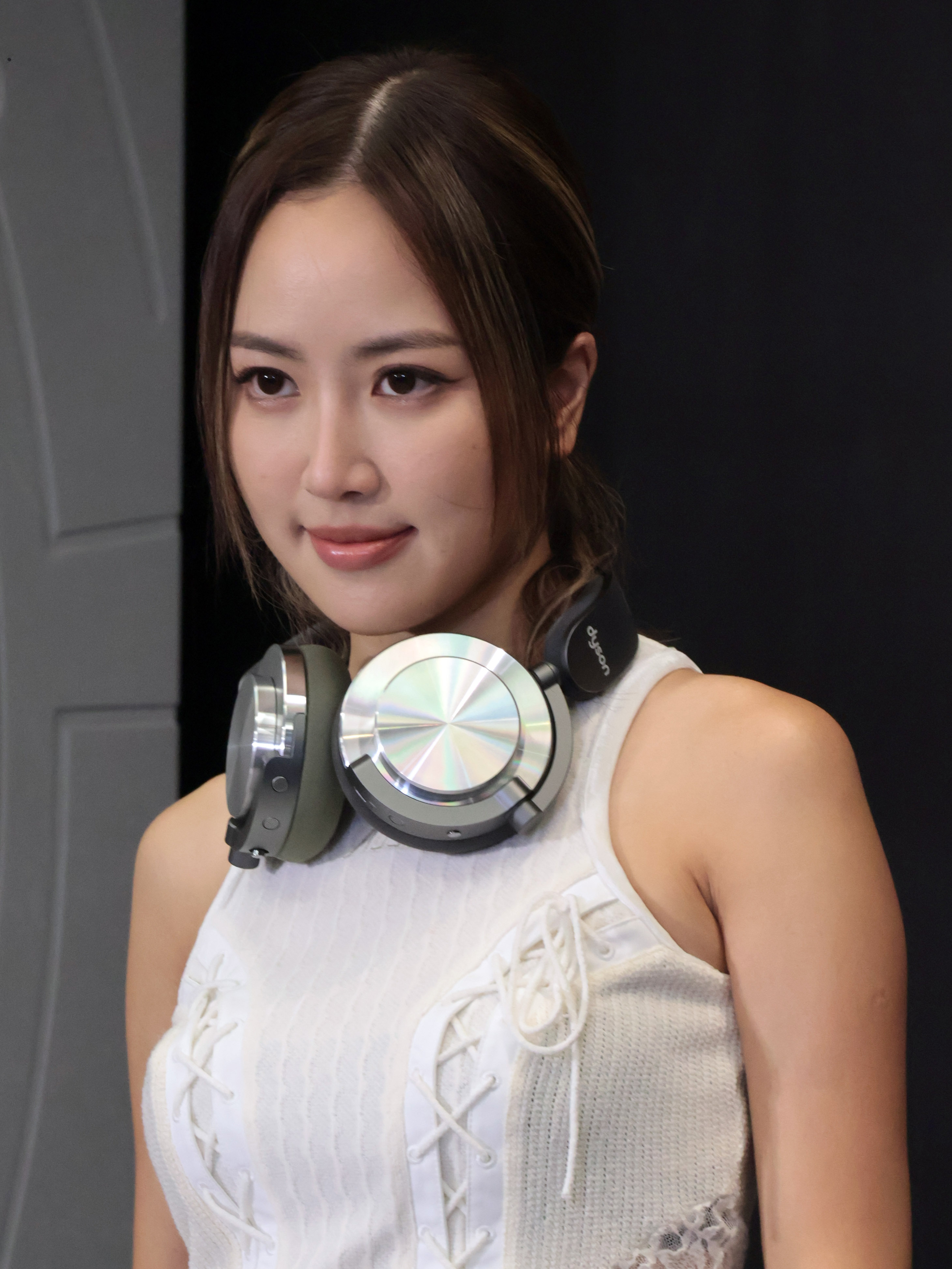

Background information
- Also known as: Kiri T
- Born: Kiri Tse Hiu Ying; December 27, 1994 (age 31); British Hong Kong
- Genres: Pop; Cantopop; Indie; R&B; Emo; Downtempo
- Occupations: Singer-Songwriter; musician; record producer; composer; lyricist; pianist
- Instruments: Piano; guitar; violin; saxophone
- Years active: 2017-present
- Labels: Warner Music Hong Kong; Kurious Grocery
- Website: kiritmusic.net
- Education: Marymount Secondary School; Berklee College of Music
- Notable work: English Songs; 10,000ft. Temporary; Psycho; Catch Vibes; Cantopop Songs; Eggnorant Sandwich; You Gotta Screw Up At Least Once; Dear Kiwi; Bilingual; Bilingual Problems
- Awards: Whats Good Music Awards 2022：Best Female Singer、Best Song（English）Silver Award《Temporary》 Music OnAir Award: Kiri T (ENEMY), (uknowdat), (Fuvk the Fairytale)

Chinese name
- Traditional Chinese: 謝曉盈
- Simplified Chinese: 谢晓盈
Transcriptions
Standard Mandarin
- Hanyu Pinyin: xiè xiǎo yíng
Yue: Cantonese
- Jyutping: ze6 hiu2 jing4

Kiri T, previously known as Kiri Tse, is a singer-songwriter currently signed under Warner Music Hong Kong. As one of the leading artists in Hong Kong who specializes in Hong Kong English pop, she often tops Hong Kong English song charts. As an alumnus of the Berklee College of Music, Kiri began her music career at the age of 14 when she started writing songs for major Cantopop stars. She debuted as an Indie singer-songwriter in 2015 with her first single, Twenty-Something. She continued her path as an indie artist while focusing on music production in the U.S. where she released notable tracks like Rearview Mirror. In 2021, Kiri released her viral album CHILI T which covers hit songs like Temporary and 10,000ft. In 2022, she joined Warner Music Hong Kong as part of the FUTURE IS NOW program and began releasing Cantopop songs. Her fanbase extends out of Hong Kong and covers U.S., Europe and Asia Pacific.

== Biography ==
=== Early life ===
Kiri went to primary school in Hong Kong and secondary school in the UK. She took classical music lessons and began composing songs. In 2009, when Kiri was fourteen, she composed the music for Joey Yung's song "Two Sides" (兩面) as her first ever musical work.

=== Education ===
Kiri studied at Berklee College of Music in the United States. In 2012, Kiri produced the song "All Is Fair", and in 2013, she wrote the song and lyrics of ALL IS FAIR. She was signed into Denise Ho's record label Goomusic, and began to write songs for other singers.

In 2015, she released her very first single, "Twenty-Something" on SoundCloud. This captured the attention of another artist, Lucian, which wrote a remix version for her. "Twenty-Something (Lucian Remix)"" got over 7 million streams on Spotify and labels were interested in signing her; however, she refused and became an independent singer-songwriter. In 2016, she performed at Denise's "Dear Friend" concert at Hong Kong Coliseum.

=== Kurious Grocery (2017–2022) ===
Kiri began her music career as an indie singer-songwriter in New York, releasing popular tracks like "Rearview Mirror, I'm Not Here" and "Strangers". In 2017, she wrote songs for award-winning Cantopop artists like Cherry Ngan, Kary Ng, Jan Lamb and Waa Wei. Her debut album Golden Kiri (2019) and subsequent single releases which showcased her unique fusion of pop, R&B and electronic music have received strong local Hong Kong radio support and topped many English music charts.

Kiri was also featured on Denise's podcast (菇武門) in 2020 after releasing well-known tracks "Psycho" and "IDontBelieveInClosures". Later, Kiri, along with other artists formed the group One One Collective and hosted songwriting camps. Later on in June 2020, she released her first Mandarin track "Fuvk the Fairytale". In 2021, Kiri T released her second album, CHILI T. The album includes well-known tracks such as "Temporary", "Psycho", and "10,000ft". Following the release of the album, she was featured on ViuTV's Chill Club TV show for the very first time. In late 2021, she composed Janice Vidal's Little Miss Janice and was featured on a ViuTV singer-songwriter program.

=== Warner Music (2022-present) ===
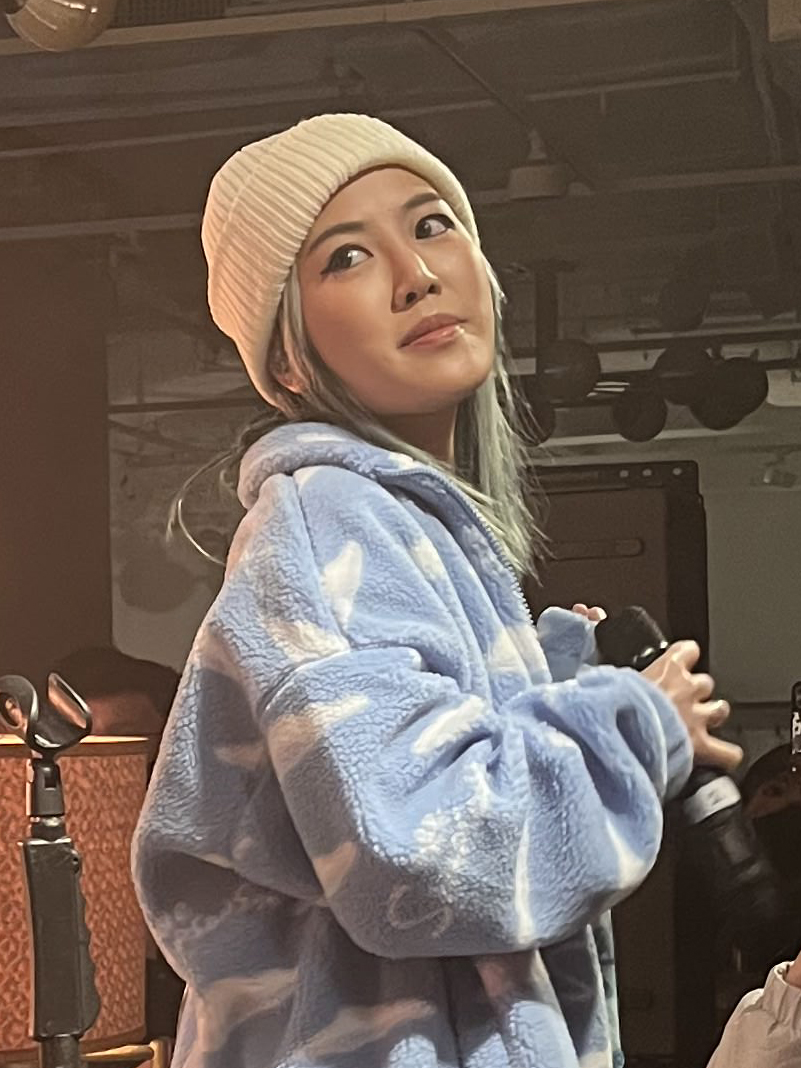
Kiri T in 2022

Kiri joined Warner Music Hong Kong as a part of the Future Is Now Program in July 2022.

"u owe me $$" (Single) & "i hate u owe me $$" (Single)

Kiri released her first single with Warner Music called u owe me $$ on July 19, 2022. The song is in English, and it interpolates pop, R&B and electro-pop. "u owe me $$" topped the 903 English Song Chart. Later on, her friend, moon tang, which is also an artist under Warner Music, thought that her song "i hate u" and Kiri's "u owe me $$" are matchy, so Kiri made an remixed medley combining the two songs, named "i hate u owe me $$".

"Twist Cone" (Single) and "Strawberry Icecream" (Single)

In October 2022, Kiri released "Twist Cone", which was her first official Cantonese song. The track went viral in Hong Kong, which made Kiri decide to release the remixed-demo version named Strawberry Icecream. Strawberry Icecream was also her first visualizer style music video, but because of this, the video did not gain much views on YouTube when it was released. On Spotify, however, the song was featured on EQUAL and EQUAL HONG KONG, which gained over 600K+ streams in less than 3 months. Some netizens have commented that they like the English version (Strawberry Icecream) better, but not the lyrics of Twist Cone since it is "a bit weird".

"Dear Kiwi" (Single) and "One Day I Might Have A Say" (Single)

Kiri released her second Cantonese song, "Dear Kiwi" after a collab with MC Cheung. The MV was filmed in Los Angeles, USA, which, Kiri, playing as a ballet, learns to not give in to other's expectation and be her true self. "Dear Kiwi" topped the 903 Cantonese chart, which was her first "champion" song on Hong Kong Cantonese song charts. The English version, "One Day I Might Have A Say", was the acoustic demo version of "Dear Kiwi", which was a visualizer again, after "Strawberry Icecream". The visualizer was a vlog of Kiri's trip in L.A., and the song became popular on Spotify after getting featured on the playlist ".ORG". Kiri was also chosen as Spotify Hong Kong's EQUAL cover artist in the same month.

"Eggnorant Sandwich" (Single)

In August 2023, Kiri released a funky-pop single "Eggnorant Sandwich" (originally called "Pottery Farm" as the demo version), which topped the CHILL CLUB chart for the week. She wrote the song with her friends Adam Pondang and Zev Troxler in a writing session in the US, with lyrics by Chung Suet and Kiri herself.

"not so xmas xmas" (EP)

In December, she collabed with Moon Tang again and released a Christmas special EP called "not so xmas xmas, and" songs "You Make It Feel Like Christmas" and "Twelve Nights of Christmas".

In late December 2023, Kiri was chosen as "7 Hong Kong female singers to watch out for in 2024" by International magazine Tatler and "Hong Kong's Top 100 Influencers" by #legend magazine.

"You Gotta Screw Up At Least Once" (Single)

In March 2024, she released "You Gotta Screw Up At Least Once", which got 1.2 million streams on Spotify in just one and a half months; the song was also her first MV on YouTube that got over 1 million plays. In the music video, Kiri was on an old truck, playing the rhythm of the song on an abandoned piano. A traffic violation was accidentally captured in the music video; in the middle of the song, a minibus was seen following the truck Kiri was on and crossed the double white line possibly due to the slow speed of the truck. Netizens joked that the MV turned into a car cam film. "You Gotta Screw Up At Least Once" also topped many charts, including Hong Kong Billboard (#1), 903 (#1), CHILL CLUB (#5) and YouTube Viral: Music (#5). The song also helped her gained at least 5K subscribers and 10K+ Instagram followers. Her YouTube channels was also merged, and her own channel became the Official Artist Channel in the same month.

"Bilingual Problems" (Single) Kiri released her 5th cantopop song on June 6, 2024, named "Bilingual Problems". The song was originally composed in English by Kiri T and Gavin Chan. Later on, Kiri, alongside Justin Yau re-arranged the song, while Chan Wing Him contributed Cantonese lyrics. The MV was filmed in Wanhua District, Taipei and in one-shot, featuring Kiri holding English letter balloons and a kiwi balloon in one hand and an old-fashioned recorder in another hand. She wore the same outfit as the MV of You Gotta Screw Up At Least Once.

== Branding ==
Kiri used to have her own music label, Kurious Grocery, a subsidiary of Denise Ho's Goomusic with Canaan Fong as her manager. The label was created back in 2017 but ceased operations in 2022 when Kiri joined Warner Music Hong Kong.

== Discography ==
Albums and EPs
Year	Album title	Type	Brand	Notes		
2019	Golden Kiri	Album	Kurious Grocery	Debut Album		
2019	San Junipero · Roll Deep in the Feels · Rearview Mirror · IDontBelieveInClosures · Better · Strangers · I'm Not Here · Castle in the Sky · Twenty-Something · 囡 To Stanford (Bonus Track)	Album	Kurious Grocery	Debut Album		
2019	Sugar Tapes	Album	Kurious Grocery			
2019	Catch Vibes · Pretty Thing · Cold Out · Colours · Rise and Shine · Like That · Curious Case of Felicia Waters · Talk to Me	Album	Kurious Grocery			
2021	CHILI T	Album	Kurious Grocery			
2021	Psycho · ENEMY · Don't Judge My Body · 1312! · Fuvk the Fairytale · icouldusealittlehelp · Temporary · Fairytale · 10,000 ft.	Album	Kurious Grocery			
2023	not so xmas xmas	EP	Warner Music (Hong Kong)	With Moon Tang		
2023	Let It Snow · Twelve Nights Of Christmas · Last Christmas · Christmas Hideaway · Not On This Christmas · You Make It Feel Like Christmas	EP	Warner Music (Hong Kong)	With Moon Tang		
Singles
Date	Song Title	Composer	Lyricist	Arranger	Producer	Notes
2015
5/10	Twenty-Something	Kiri T				
10/30	Twenty-Something; (Lucian Remix)	Kiri T		Kiri T/Lucian		
2016
5/9	Leave	Kiri T				Demo of Kary Ng's 奉愛之名
2017
6/20	I'm Not Here	Kiri T	Kiri T/Max Mckellar	Kiri T	Matthew Sim	
6/26	I'm Not Here (HIRSK Remix)	Kiri T			hirsk	
7/12	Size 9	Kiri T/Alex Fung	Jan Lamb	Alex Fung		Cantopop single with Jan Lamb
7/14	I'm Not Here (Kultur Remix)	Kiri T			Kultur	
8/11	Rearview Mirror	Kiri T/Matthew Sim/Max Mckellar			Kiri T/Max Mckellar	
9/15	Better	Kiri T	Kiri T/Max Mckellar	Kiri T	Kiri T/Alexander Fung/Matthew Sim	
11/17	Roll Deep In The Feels	Kiri T			hirsk	
2018
1/12	Strangers	Kiri T			Kiri T/Matthew Sim	
12/22	In Between	SOPHY		Kiri T	Jeff Chan	With Sophy Wong
2019
3/8	IDontBelieveInClosures	Kiri T		hirsk	4AM Class (Kiri T/hirsk/Daniel Chu)	
4/12	IDontBelieveInClosures; (Golden Mix)	Kiri T		Kiri T/Daniel Chu	Kiri T	
4/23	San Junipero	Kiri T				
4/23	Castle in the Sky	Kiri T				
4/23	囡 (To Stanford)	Kotringo	Canaan Fong	Kiri T	Kiri T/HOCC	
9/19	Psycho	Kiri T/Daniel Chu				
2020
2/10	財神爺 Choi Sun Yeah	Kiri T/Nichung		Kiri T	Kiri T/Daniel Chu	Cantopop single with Nichung; released under One One Collective
2/17	ENEMY	Kiri T/Jimmy Harry/Daniel Chu		4AM Class (Kiri T/hirsk/Daniel Chu)		
5/15	Don't Stress	Kiri T/Jeffery Ng/; JNYBeatz/VUCHS	Kiri T/VUCHS/JNYBeatz			
6/1	Fuvk the Fairytale	Kiri T	Kiri T/Canaan Fong	Kiri T		
9/1	Keep On Breathing	Kiri T				Ad song for Doughnut
9/4	uknowdat	Kiri T	Geniuz F the Future	Kiri T		With Geniuz the Future
2021
2/26	10,000 ft.	Kiri T/Lux Pyramid/; George Morgan		Kiri T/Lux Pyramid	Kiri T/Lux Pyramid	
2/26	Temporary	Kiri T				
2/26	Fairytale	Kiri T/Daniel Chu		4AM Class (Kiri T/hirsk/Daniel Chu)		
2/26	Don't Judge My Body	Kiri T/Daniel Chu		4AM Class (Kiri T/hirsk/Daniel Chu)		
2/26	icouldusealittlehelp	Kiri T/Daniel Chu		4AM Class (Kiri T/hirsk/Daniel Chu)		
2/26	1312!	Kiri T/mxngo		Kiri T/VUCHS		
4/25	南亞仔	Kiri T	Kiri T/ZAIN	Kiri T		Cantopop single with ZAIN
9/23	10,000 ft	Kiri T/Lux Pyramid/; George Morgan		Kiri T	Kiri T/Edward Chan	Featuring Jason Chan
11/18	自作孽	Kiri T	ZAIN/Canaan Fong	Kiri T		Cantopop single with ZAIN
2022
2/24	Dating Rules	Kiri T				With Janice Vidal
7/19	u owe me $$	Kiri T/Daniel Chu/Gavin Chan		Kiri T	Kiri T/Daniel Chu	
8/30	i hate u owe me $$	Kiri T/Daniel Chu/Gavin Chan/moon tang	Kiri T/Daniel Chu/Gavin Chan/moon tang/Daniel Toh	Kiri T		With moon tang
10/17	Twist Cone (扭擰雪糕屋)	Kiri T/Daniel Chu/Gavin Chan	Chung Suet	Kiri T	Kiri T/Daniel Chu	First cantopop single
12/7	Strawberry Icecream	Kiri T/Daniel Chu/Gavin Chan	Kiri T/Daniel Chu/Gavin Chan	Kiri T	Kiri T	Demo version of Twist Cone
2023
2/13	The One For U (Not For Me) (世一 (不可一世))	Kiri T/Jay Fung/Gareth Chan/JNYBeatz	Wyman Wong	Derrick Sepnio /Fergus Chow /Nick Wong	Gareth Chan	Cantopop single with MC Chueng
3/23	Dear Kiwi (歧義種子)	Kiri T/Daniel Toh	Chung Suet	Kiri T/Daniel Chu	Kiri T/Gareth Chan	Cantopop Single
4/25	One Day I Might Have A Say	Kiri T/Daniel Toh/Gavin Chan		Kiri T/Daniel Chu/Daniel Toh	Kiri T	Demo version of Dear Kiwi
8/8	Eggnorant Sandwich (關我蛋治)	Kiri T/Zev Troxler/Terence Po Lun Lam/Adam Pondang	Kiri T/Chung Suet/Zex Troxler	Terence Po Lun Lam/Adam Pondang		Cantopop Single
12/5	Let It Snow	Jule Styne	Sammy Cahn	Lushroom		With moon tang
12/5	Twelve Nights of Christmas	Federic Austin/Enoch Cheng	Kiri T/Federic Austin/Gavin Chan	Enoch Cheng	Kiri T/Enoch Cheng	
12/5	Not On This Christmas	Kiri T/Gavin Chan		Kiri T	Kiri T/Gavin Chan	
12/5	You Make It Feel Like Christmas	Busbee/Justin Tranter/Gwen Stefani/Blake Shelton		Kiri T		With moon tang
2024
3/19	You Gotta Screw Up At Least Once (至少做一件離譜的事)	Kiri T/J.Arie/Gavin Chan	Wyman Wong	Kiri T/Sotoc	Kiri T/Gareth Chan	Cantopop Single
6/6	Bilingual Problems (有些話要用英文說)	Kiri T/Gavin Chan	Kiri T/Chan Wing Him	Kiri T/Justin Yau	Kiri T/Jeffero Chan	Cantopop Single
9/3	Beyond Words (傷心的時候別説話)	Jay Fung/Gareth Chan	Erin Yan	Kiri T	Kiri T/Gareth Chan	Cantopop Single
11/4	縈	Eagle Chan/Esther Wu	Winnie. L	Esther Wu	Sotoc	Song from; 埋班作樂III

Composed Songs

Year	Song	Artist	Role
2009	兩面	Joey Yung	Composer
2012	無臉人	Denise Ho	Composer
2012	ALL IS FAIR	Denise Ho	Composer and Lyrics
2013	在青木原的第三天	Denise Ho	Composer
2016	親愛的黑色	Denise Ho	Arranger
2017	閃光	Cherry Ngan	Composer and Arrangement
2017	惡女	Cherry Ngan	Arrangement
2017	奉愛之名	Kary Ng	Composer and Arrangement
2017	Come With Me	Kary Ng	Arrangement
2017	雪女	Waa Wei	Arrangement
2017	九號鞋 (feat. Kiri T)	Jan Lamb	Composer
2018	Yeah!	Eman Lam	Composer and Arrangement
2018	閃光	Cherry Ngan	Arrangement
2019	773312	Kay Tse	Composer
2019	代你白頭	Denise Ho	Arrangement and Producer
2020	Negative	Alferd Hui	Arrangement and Producer
2020	我總是想像你離開後的日子	Denise Ho	Composer, Arrangement and Producer
2021	南亞仔	ZAIN	Composer and Arrangement
2021	自作孽	ZAIN	Composer, Arrangement and Producer
2022	I Like Being Yours	Sabrina Cheung	Background Vocal Arrangement
2022	Maybe That's The Right Time	Sabrina Cheung	Background Vocal Arrangement
2022	Little Miss Janice	Janice Vidal	Composer, Arrangement and Producer
2022	Dating Rules (feat. Kiri T)	Janice Vidal	Composer, Lyrics, Arrangement and Producer
2022	Hong Kong Toolbar《叱咤樂壇》Radio Jingle		Composer and Arrangement
2023	世一	MC	Background Vocal Arrangement
2023	世一（不可一世）	MC	Composer (with Jay Fung, Gareth Chan, JNYBeatz); Background Vocal Arrangement and Chorus
2023	Teaser	Nancy Kwai	Composer, Lyrics, Arrangement and Producer
2023	掰掰歌	JACE	Arranger and Producer
2023	Last Christmas	Moon Tang	Arranger and Producer
2024	In Love In The Morning	Sabrina Cheung	Background Vocal Arrangement
2024	Pamper Ü	JACE	Composer, Producer, Background Vocal Producer and; Background Vocal Arrangement

== Filmography ==
=== Music Video Appearances ===
Year	Singer	Song title
2021	ZAIN	自作孽
2021	ZAIN	南亞仔
2022	Janice Vidal	Dating Rules (Live at Warner Music Studio)
2022	Dear Jane	Deadline Fighter
2026	Kaho Hung	一筆滿意

=== Programs and Shows ===
Year	Program Title
2018	wow and flutter live
2018	RTHK The Works
2019	wow and flutter live
2019	KKBOX – Kiri Meets People：Fan Matching!
2019	RTHK The Works
2020	KKBOX – 2nd Annual KKBOX Campus Ambassador x Kiri T Interview
2020	谷 Live
2021	ViuTV – CHILL CLUB EP116
2021	ViuTV – Art Junction EP24
2021	生 (Sheng) Sessions
2022	ViuTV 歌手門 (feat. Janice Vidal)
2023	ViuTV – Talker: Shopping More EP12
2023	Music Panda EP37 (feat. Moon Tang & On Chan)
2023	ViuTV – CHILL CLUB EP203
2024	ViuTV – CHILL CLUB EP218
2024	Music Panda EP43 (feat. Per se)
2024	ViuTV – CHILL CLUB EP239

== Collaboration ==
moon tang

As artists under the same label Warner Music Hong Kong that share similarities in music style, Kiri T and moon tang often collaborate on musical projects. In terms of music, Kiri and moon first started their musical “friendship” back in 2021 when they held a joint concert; then, in 2022, Kiri joined Warner Music Hong Kong and released the single, u owe me $$. At the same time, moon tang also released the catchy song i hate u. The two singer-songwriters decided to make a remixed medley of the two songs, named i hate u owe me $$, which was the first song they collabed on. Since then, they have appeared in multiple TV programs and concerts together such as Music Panda, Summer Vibes by Pacific Place, YouTube Music Night, FUTURE IS NOW, CHILL CLUB and many more. In December 2023, they collabed again and released the viral Christmas EP, not so xmas xmas. As of 2024, they have collabed and co-released a total of 7 songs and 1 EP.

HIRSK and Daniel Chu

As alumnus of the Berklee College of Music, Kiri T, HIRSK and Daniel Chu formed the 4AM Class and often write songs together. Their music style often combines electropop, jazz and R&B.

== Awards ==
- Whats Good Music Awards 2022：Best Female Singer, Best Song (English) Bronze Award: Kiri T – Temporary
- Music OnAir Award Best Songs: Kiri T – ENEMY, Kiri T – uknowdat (feat. Geniuz F the FUTURE), Kiri T – Fuvk the Fairytale
- 22nd '''CASH Golden Sail Music Awards''' Best Melody: Kiri T – You Gotta Screw Up At Least Once
