= Hong Kong Songs =

Hong Kong music chart

The Hong Kong Songs is a record chart that ranks the best-performing songs in Hong Kong since February 2022. Published by Billboard magazine, the data are compiled by MRC Data based collectively on each single's weekly digital streaming and download sales. It was announced on February 14, 2022, as part of Billboard's Hits of the World chart collection, ranking the top 25 songs weekly in more than 40 countries around the globe.

Every Tuesday, a new chart is compiled and officially released to the public on its website. Each chart is dated with the "week-ending" date of the Saturday four days later.

== List of number-one songs ==
=== 2025 ===
No.	Issue date	Song	Artist(s)	Ref.
1	January 4	"APT."	Rosé and Bruno Mars	
2	January 11	"APT."	Rosé and Bruno Mars	
3	January 18	"Liar"	MC Cheung	
4	January 25	"Liar"	MC Cheung	
5	February 1	"Liar"	MC Cheung	
6	February 8	"Liar"	MC Cheung	
7	February 15	"Liar"	MC Cheung	
8	February 22	"Liar"	MC Cheung	
9	March 1	"Liar"	MC Cheung	
10	March 8	"Liar"	MC Cheung	
11	March 15	"Liar"	MC Cheung	
12	March 22	"Like Jennie"	Jennie	
13	March 29	"Liar"	MC Cheung	
14	April 5	"Liar"	MC Cheung	
15	April 12	"Liar"	MC Cheung	
16	April 19	"In Doubt"	MC Cheung	
17	April 26	"In Doubt"	MC Cheung	
18	May 3	"Liar"	MC Cheung	
19	May 10	"Liar"	MC Cheung	
20	May 17	"Ginkgo"	Keung To	
21	May 24	"Ginkgo"	Keung To	
22	May 31	"By My Side"	Tyson Yoshi and Hins Cheung	
23	June 7	"Ginkgo"	Keung To	
24	June 14	"Ginkgo"	Keung To	
25	June 21	"No Full Frontal"	Gareth.T	
26	June 28	"No Full Frontal"	Gareth.T	
27	July 5	"No Full Frontal"	Gareth.T	
28	July 12	"No Full Frontal"	Gareth.T	
29	July 19	"No Full Frontal"	Gareth.T	
30	July 26	"No Full Frontal"	Gareth.T	
31	August 2	"No Full Frontal"	Gareth.T	
32	August 9	"No Full Frontal"	Gareth.T	
33	August 16	"No Full Frontal"	Gareth.T	
34	August 23	"Golden"	Ejae, Audrey Nuna and Rei Ami	
35	August 30	"Golden"	Ejae, Audrey Nuna and Rei Ami	
36	September 6	"Golden"	Ejae, Audrey Nuna and Rei Ami	
37	September 13	"Golden"	Ejae, Audrey Nuna and Rei Ami	
38	September 20	"Lonely Planet"	Keung To	
39	September 27	"Lonely Planet"	Keung To	
40	October 4	"Golden"	Ejae, Audrey Nuna and Rei Ami	
41	October 11	"No Full Frontal"	Gareth.T	
42	October 18	"Golden"	Ejae, Audrey Nuna and Rei Ami	
43	October 25	"Golden"	Ejae, Audrey Nuna and Rei Ami	
44	November 1	"Golden"	Ejae, Audrey Nuna and Rei Ami	
45	November 8	"Golden"	Ejae, Audrey Nuna and Rei Ami	
46	November 15	"No More"	Gareth.T and Skai Isyourgod	
47	November 22	"No Full Frontal"	Gareth.T	
48	November 29	"No Full Frontal"	Gareth.T	
49	December 6	"No Full Frontal"	Gareth.T	
50	December 13	"No Full Frontal"	Gareth.T	
51	December 20	"No Full Frontal"	Gareth.T	

=== 2024 ===
No.	Issue date	Song	Artist(s)	Ref.
1	January 6	"Emergency Contact"	Gareth.T	
2	January 13	"Emergency Contact"	Gareth.T	
3	January 20	"Permanent Damage"	MC Cheung & Panther Chan	
4	January 27	"Permanent Damage"	MC Cheung & Panther Chan	
5	February 3	"Permanent Damage"	MC Cheung & Panther Chan	
6	February 10	"Tinted Windows"	Kaho Hung	
7	February 17	"Emergency Contact"	Gareth.T	
8	February 24	"Tinted Windows"	Kaho Hung	
9	March 2	"Tinted Windows"	Kaho Hung	
10	March 9	"Easy"	Le Sserafim	
11	March 16	"Easy"	Le Sserafim	
12	March 23	"3-Life of Luck"	Yan Ting	
13	March 30	"Background Noise"	MC Cheung	
14	April 6	"3-Life of Luck"	Yan Ting	
15	April 13	"Magnetic"	Illit	
16	April 20	"Magnetic"	Illit	
17	April 27	"Magnetic"	Illit	
18	May 4	"Fortnight"	Taylor Swift featuring Post Malone	
19	May 11	"Magnetic"	Illit	
20	May 18	"You're Out of This World"	Keung To	
21	May 25	"You're Out of This World"	Keung To	
22	June 1	"Supernova"	Aespa	
23	June 8	"How Sweet"	NewJeans	
24	June 15	"How Sweet"	NewJeans	
25	June 22	"Would You Be Mine?"	Tyson Yoshi	
26	June 29	"You Gotta Screw Up at Least Once"	Kiri T	
27	July 6	"You Gotta Screw Up at Least Once"	Kiri T	
28	July 13	"Rockstar"	Lisa	
29	July 20	"Solitude"	Ian Chan	
30	July 27	"Solitude"	Ian Chan	
31	August 3	"You're Out of This World"	Keung To	
32	August 10	"You're Out of This World"	Keung To	
33	August 17	"You're Out of This World"	Keung To	
34	August 24	"Every Single Time"	Keung To	
35	August 31	"Every Single Time"	Keung To	
36	September 7	"Mind Your Ex"	MC Cheung	
37	September 14	"Every Single Time"	Keung To	
38	September 21	"Every Single Time"	Keung To	
39	September 28	"Every Single Time"	Keung To	
40	October 5	"Every Single Time"	Keung To	
41	October 12	"Every Single Time"	Keung To	
42	October 19	"Every Single Time"	Keung To	
43	October 26	"Mantra"	Jennie	
44	November 2	"APT."	Rosé and Bruno Mars	
45	November 9	"APT."	Rosé and Bruno Mars	
46	November 16	"APT."	Rosé and Bruno Mars	
47	November 23	"APT."	Rosé and Bruno Mars	
48	November 30	"APT."	Rosé and Bruno Mars	
49	December 7	"APT."	Rosé and Bruno Mars	
50	December 14	"APT."	Rosé and Bruno Mars	
51	December 21	"APT."	Rosé and Bruno Mars	
52	December 28	"APT."	Rosé and Bruno Mars	

=== 2023 ===
No.	Issue date	Song	Artist(s)	Ref.
1	January 7	"What Happened"	Dear Jane	
2	January 14	"What Happened"	Dear Jane	
3	January 21	"What Happened"	Dear Jane	
4	January 28	"What Happened"	Dear Jane	
5	February 4	"The One for You"	MC Cheung	
6	February 11	"The One for You"	MC Cheung	
7	February 18	"The One for You"	MC Cheung	
8	February 25	"What Happened"	Dear Jane	
9	March 4	"The One for You"	MC Cheung	
10	March 11	"What Happened"	Dear Jane	
11	March 18	"Loner Anthem"	Gareth.T	
12	March 25	"Loner Anthem"	Gareth.T	
13	April 1	"Tsui"	Keung To	
14	April 8	"What Happened"	Dear Jane	
15	April 15	"Flower"	Jisoo	
16	April 22	"Flower"	Jisoo	
17	April 29	"Flower"	Jisoo	
18	May 6	"Imaginary Fairground"	Hins Cheung	
19	May 13	"What If"	Terence Lam	
20	May 20	"Cupid"	Fifty Fifty	
21	May 27	"Cupid"	Fifty Fifty	
22	June 3	"Cupid"	Fifty Fifty	
23	June 10	"Tsui"	Keung To	
24	June 17	"Dummy"	Keung To	
25	June 24	"Dummy"	Keung To	
26	July 1	"Dummy"	Keung To	
27	July 8	"Dummy"	Keung To	
28	July 15	"Dummy"	Keung To	
29	July 22	"Super Shy"	NewJeans	
30	July 29	"Seven"	Jung Kook featuring Latto	
31	August 5	"Seven"	Jung Kook featuring Latto	
32	August 12	"Inhale"	MC Cheung	
33	August 19	"Seven"	Jung Kook featuring Latto	
34	August 26	"Seven"	Jung Kook featuring Latto	
35	September 2	"Seven"	Jung Kook featuring Latto	
36	September 9	"Seven"	Jung Kook featuring Latto	
37	September 16	"Seven"	Jung Kook featuring Latto	
38	September 23	"Not My Problem"	MC Cheung	
39	September 30	"Seven"	Jung Kook featuring Latto	
40	October 7	"Seven"	Jung Kook featuring Latto	
41	October 14	"3D"	Jung Kook featuring Jack Harlow	
42	October 21	"You & Me"	Jennie	
43	October 28	"You & Me"	Jennie	
44	November 4	"Seven"	Jung Kook featuring Latto	
45	November 11	"Seven"	Jung Kook featuring Latto	
46	November 18	"Seven"	Jung Kook featuring Latto	
47	November 25	"Perfect Night"	Le Sserafim	
48	December 2	"Seven"	Jung Kook featuring Latto	
49	December 9	"Perfect Night"	Le Sserafim	
50	December 16	"Emergency Contact"	Gareth.T	
51	December 23	"Emergency Contact"	Gareth.T	
52	December 30	"Emergency Contact"	Gareth.T	

=== 2022 ===
No.	Issue date	Song	Artist(s)	Ref.
1	February 19	"Pillow Talk"	MC Cheung	
2	February 26	"Pillow Talk"	MC Cheung	
3	March 5	"Regression"	Terence Lam	
4	March 12	"Pillow Talk"	MC Cheung	
5	March 19	"Pillow Talk"	MC Cheung	
6	March 26	"Pillow Talk"	MC Cheung	
7	April 2	"Pillow Talk"	MC Cheung	
8	April 9	"Pillow Talk"	MC Cheung	
9	April 16	"Still Life"	BigBang	
10	April 23	"Red Scarf" (Till We Meet Again Movie Theme Song)	WeiBird	
11	April 30	"Caution Wet Floor"	MC Cheung	
12	May 7	"Caution Wet Floor"	MC Cheung	
13	May 14	"Pillow Talk"	MC Cheung	
14	May 21	"Pillow Talk"	MC Cheung	
15	May 28	"Cherlas"	Hins Cheung	
16	June 4	"Cherlas"	Hins Cheung	
17	June 11	"Pillow Talk"	MC Cheung	
18	June 18	"Pillow Talk"	MC Cheung	
19	June 25	"Pillow Talk"	MC Cheung	
20	July 2	"Dear My Friend,"	Keung To	
21	July 9	"Dear My Friend,"	Keung To	
22	July 16	"Dear My Friend,"	Keung To	
23	July 23	"Greatest Works of Art"	Jay Chou	
24	July 30	"A Gentleman's Guide to Old-Fashioned Dating"	MC Cheung	
25	August 6	"A Gentleman's Guide to Old-Fashioned Dating"	MC Cheung	
26	August 13	"A Gentleman's Guide to Old-Fashioned Dating"	MC Cheung	
27	August 20	"A Gentleman's Guide to Old-Fashioned Dating"	MC Cheung	
28	August 27	"A Gentleman's Guide to Old-Fashioned Dating"	MC Cheung	
29	September 3	"Pink Venom"	Blackpink	
30	September 10	"A Gentleman's Guide to Old-Fashioned Dating"	MC Cheung	
31	September 17	"A Gentleman's Guide to Old-Fashioned Dating"	MC Cheung	
32	September 24	"A Gentleman's Guide to Old-Fashioned Dating"	MC Cheung	
33	October 1	"Shut Down"	Blackpink	
34	October 8	"A Gentleman's Guide to Old-Fashioned Dating"	MC Cheung	
35	October 15	"A Gentleman's Guide to Old-Fashioned Dating"	MC Cheung	
36	October 22	"A Gentleman's Guide to Old-Fashioned Dating"	MC Cheung	
37	October 29	"A Gentleman's Guide to Old-Fashioned Dating"	MC Cheung	
38	November 5	"What Happened"	Dear Jane	
39	November 12	"What Happened"	Dear Jane	
40	November 19	"What Happened"	Dear Jane	
41	November 26	"What Happened"	Dear Jane	
42	December 3	"What Happened"	Dear Jane	
43	December 10	"What Happened"	Dear Jane	
44	December 17	"What Happened"	Dear Jane	
45	December 24	"What Happened"	Dear Jane	
46	December 31	"What Happened"	Dear Jane	

== Artist milestones ==
=== Most cumulative weeks at number one ===
Rank	Artist	Count
1st	Keung To	52
2nd	MC Cheung	49
3rd	Dear Jane	16
4th	Jung Kook	14
5th	Latto	13
6th	Rosé	11
6th	Bruno Mars	11
7th	Gareth.T	8
8th	Le Sserafim	4
8th	Illit	4
8th	Jennie	4
8th	Hins Cheung	4
9th	Jisoo	3
9th	Fifty Fifty	3
9th	Panther Chan	3
9th	NewJeans	3
9th	Kaho Hung	3
10th	Blackpink	2
10th	Terence Lam	2
10th	Yan Ting	2
10th	Kiri T	2
10th	Ian Chan	2
10th	Tyson Yoshi	2
11th	Jay Chou	1
11th	WeiBird	1
11th	BigBang	1
11th	Jack Harlow	1
11th	Taylor Swift	1
11th	Post Malone	1
11th	Aespa	1
11th	Lisa	1
11th	Justin Bieber	1
11th	Nicki Minaj	1

== Song milestones ==
=== Most weeks at number one ===
No. of weeks	Song	Artist	Year(s)	Ref.
16	"What Happened"	Dear Jane	2022–2023	
22	"No Full Frontal"	Gareth.T	2025-2026	
14	"Liar"	MC Cheung	2025	
13	"Seven"	Jung Kook featuring Latto	2023	
11	"APT."	Rosé and Bruno Mars	2024–2025	
12	"Pillow Talk"	MC Cheung	2021	
12	"A Gentleman's Guide to Old-Fashioned Dating"	MC Cheung	2022	
8	"Every Single Time"	Keung To	2024	
