= Nancy Kwai =

Hong Kong singer and actress (born 2000)

- 歸綽嶢
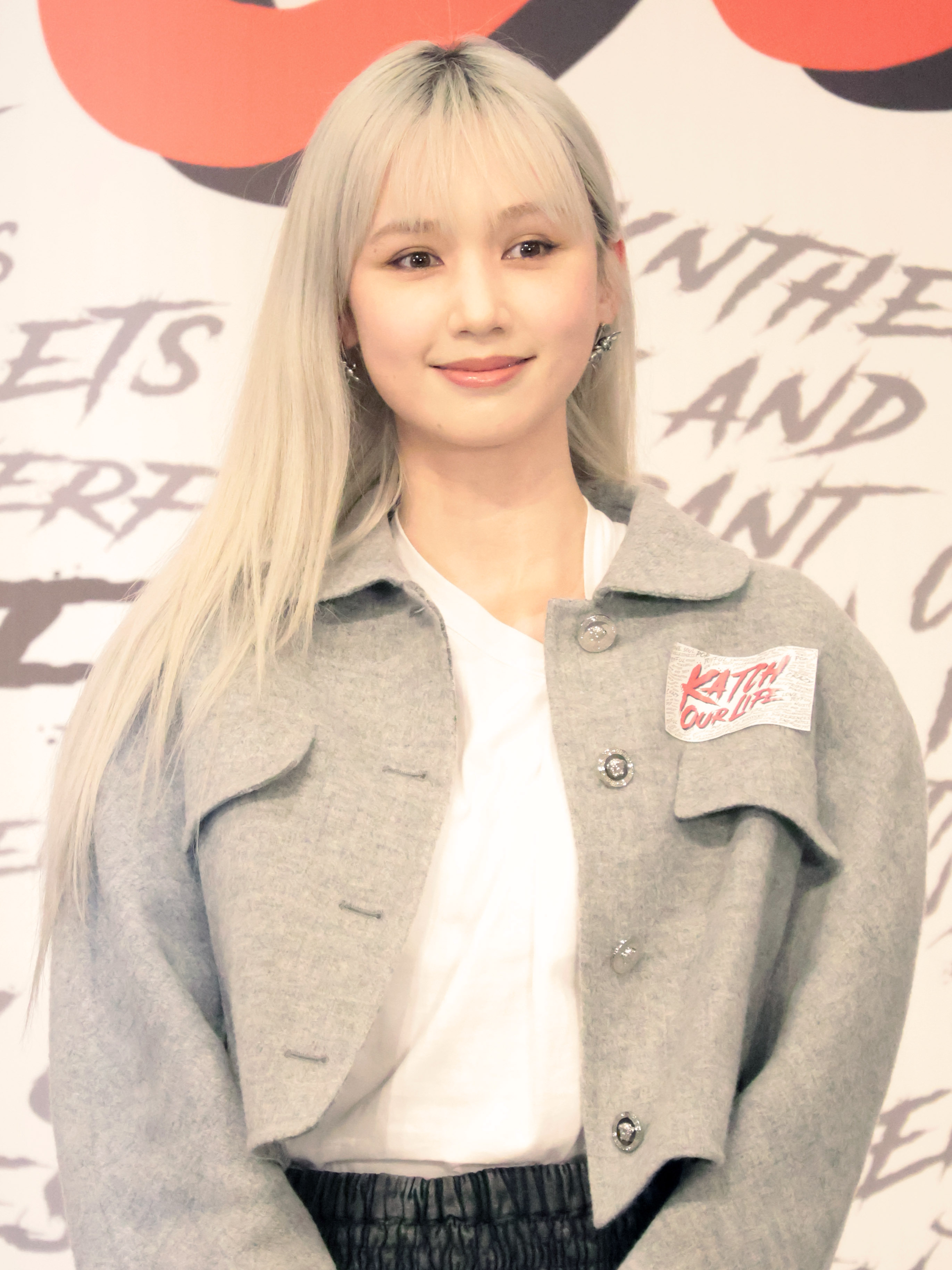
- Kwai in May 2024
- Born: Kwai Nam-sin (歸南茜); 2000 (age 25–26); Hong Kong
- Education: Lingnan University (BA)
- Occupations: Singer; actress
- Musical career
- Instrument: Vocals
- Years active: 2022–present
- Label: Warner Music Hong Kong

Nancy Kwai Cheuk-yiu (Chinese: 歸綽嶢; born 15 February 2000) is a Hong Kong singer and actress.

== Biography ==
Kwai was born in 2000. She enjoyed singing as an interest when she was young, but had never thought of being a professional singer. Kwai attended Lingnan University and graduated with a Bachelor of Arts in cultural studies. She worked as a model during her university years and gained popularity on the internet after filming an advertisement for Daikin in 2020. She also appeared in the music videos of Dear Jane's "Ended Before We Even Started" and Kaho Hung's "Monologue" in the same year. In 2021, Kwai made her onscreen debut in ViuTV's 2021 anthology series You Only Live Once.

Kwai was signed by Warner Music Hong Kong as a singer in late 2022. She released her first single, "Teaser", in January 2023, which was labelled as a "903 Special Recommendation" by Commercial Radio Hong Kong. She released her second single, "Count to Three", in April 2023, and appeared in the music video of MC's "The One For U". Later the same year, Kwai guest-starred in ViuTV's thriller series Left On Read as a schoolgirl who is brutally murdered in the first episode. She also made her film debut in the 2023 drama film Time Still Turns the Pages, portraying the teenage version of Hanna Chan's character. In 2024, Kwai won Best Female Debut Singer in the Chill Club Chart Award Presentation 23/24.

== Discography ==
=== Studio albums ===
List of studio albums, with selected chart positions
Title	Album details	Peak chart positions					Ref.
Title	Album details	CRHK	RTHK	Metro Radio	TVB	ViuTV	Ref.
Premiere	Released: 1 February 2024; Label: Warner Music Hong Kong; Formats: CD, digital download	—N/a	—N/a	—N/a	—N/a	—N/a	
Blossoming	Released: 15 April 2025; Label: Warner Music Hong Kong; Formats: digital download	—N/a	—N/a	—N/a	—N/a	—N/a	

=== Singles ===
Year	Title	Album	Ref.
2023	"Teaser"	premiere	
2023	"Count to Three"	premiere	
2023	"You took my breath away"	premiere	
2023	"Look into my eyes"	premiere	
2023	"Never mind"	premiere	
2023	"To be continued"	premiere	
2024	"Out of the blue"	—N/a	
2024	"Let Go"	—N/a	
2025	"I Tried..."	—N/a	

== Filmography ==
=== Films ===
Year	Title	Role	Notes/Ref.
2023	Time Still Turns the Pages	Sherry Lam (Teenage)	

=== Television ===
Year	Title	Role	Notes/Ref.
2021	You Only Live Once	Nancy	Main role
2023	Left On Read	Grace	Guest role

== Awards and nominations ==
Year	Award	Category	Result	Ref.
2023	Ultimate Song Chart Awards Presentation	Ultimate Female Newcomers	silver	
2024	Chill Club Chart Award Presentation 23/24	Best Female Debut Singer	Won	
