= MC (singer) =

Hong Kong pop singer

Michael Cheung
- 張天賦
- Cheung in 2026
- Born: December 1, 1996 (age 29); Hong Kong
- Other name: MC
- Occupations: Singer; actor
- Years active: 2019–present
- Musical career
- Origin: Hong Kong
- Genre: Cantopop
- Instrument: Vocals
- Label: Warner Music Hong Kong
- Website: Official Instagram

Chinese name
- Traditional Chinese: 張天賦
- Simplified Chinese: 张天赋
Transcriptions
Standard Mandarin
- Hanyu Pinyin: Zhāng Tiān-fù
Yue: Cantonese
- Jyutping: zoeng^{1} tin^{1} fu^{3}

Michael Cheung Tin-fu (Note: traditional Chinese: 張天賦; simplified Chinese: 张天赋; Jyutping: Cheung^{1} Tin^{1}-fu^{3}) (born 1 December 1996), better known by his stage name MC Cheung Tin-fu, is a Hong Kong singer and actor. He rose to fame as the runner-up in the 2019 talent competition reality show King Maker II. He subsequently signed a record deal with Warner Music Hong Kong and made his debut with the single "Good Time" in 2021. He won various new artist awards, including 2021 Ultimate Song Chart Best Male Newcomer (Gold).

== Early life and education ==
Cheung was born in Hong Kong on 1 December 1996. At a young age, he emigrated to Canada to pursue studies, where he subsequently graduated.

== Career ==
Cheung gained prominence as a runner-up in the 2019 Hong Kong reality competition show, King Maker II. He rejected an offer from ViuTV to join a boyband in order to pursue a solo career. In December 2020, Cheung signed a record label deal with Warner Music Hong Kong and released his debut EP Have a Good Time (2021) a year later. His 2021 single "Pillow Talk" topped the Hong Kong Songs chart for 12 weeks and its accompanying music video earned more than 20 million YouTube views. The success helped Cheung earned the gold award for Best New Male Artist at the Ultimate Song Chart Awards Presentation 2021.

== Impact ==
In 2023, Cheung was named among Forbes's Asia "30 under 30" list.

== Discography ==
=== Studio albums ===
| Title | Album details | Tracklisting | Ref. |
|---|---|---|---|
| This is MC | Released: 20 January 2023; Label: Warner Music Hong Kong; Formats: CD, digital download, streaming | 1. Overkill; 2. This Is MC; 3. The One For U (世一); 4. A Gentleman's Guide to Old-Fashioned Dating (老派約會之必要); 5. Obedience (乖乖報到); 6. Fun Fair (只限成人入場); 7. Caution Wet Floor (小心地滑); 8. Assurance (最低保障); 9. Drink Up (乾); 10. The One For U Not For Me (世一 (不可一世)) (feat. Kri T.) | |
| Treble | Released: 12 March 2024; Label: Warner Music Hong Kong; Formats: CD, digital download, streaming | 1. Not My Problem (與我無關); 2. Floral Sea (花海); 3. September with You; 4. Background Noise (隔牆有耳); 5. Permanent Damage (永久損毀) (feat. Panther Chan); 6. Inhale (抽); 7. AM730 (七點半鐘的陽光); 8. The Last Straw (救命稻草); 9. Secondary Personality (第二人格); 10. Butterfly (feat. Hei-Z, Kwan.T) | |

=== Extended plays ===
| Title | Album details | Tracklisting | Ref. |
|---|---|---|---|
| Have A Good Time | Released: 22 December 2021; Label: Warner Music Hong Kong; Formats: CD, digital download, streaming | 1. Good Time; 2. Overruled (反對無效); 3. Loser; 4. Pillow Talk (記憶棉); 5. About Time (時候不早); 6. How Many Times | |

=== Singles ===
| Title | Year | Peak chart positions | Album |
| Title | Year | HK | Album |
|---|---|---|---|
| "Good Time" | 2021 | — | Have A Good Time |
| "Overruled" (反對無效) | 2021 | 2 | Have A Good Time |
| "How Many Times" (with Jay Fung) (English) | 2021 | — | Non-album singles |
| "Can't Stop Myself Tonight" (with Jay Fung) (English) | 2021 | — | Non-album singles |
| "Loser" | 2021 | — | Have A Good Time |
| "Pillow Talk" (記憶棉) | 2021 | 1 | Have A Good Time |
| "About Time" (時候不早) | 2021 | 3 | Have A Good Time |
| "Stay Busy Over Christmas" (聖誕很忙) (with Kaho Hung) | 2021 | 21 | This is MC |
| "Caution Wet Floor" (小心地滑) | 2022 | 1 | This is MC |
| "A Gentleman's Guide to Old-Fashioned Dating" (老派約會之必要) | 2022 | 1 | This is MC |
| "Frenemy" (with Kaho Hung) | 2022 | 14 | Frenemy |
| "Why Not Both" (二損一) (with Kaho Hung) | 2022 | — | Frenemy |
| "Warning" (觸電) (with Kaho Hung) | 2022 | — | Frenemy |
| "Drink Up" (乾) | 2022 | 16 | This is MC |
| "Overkill" | 2022 | — | This is MC |
| "The One For U" (世一) | 2023 | 1 | This is MC |
| "Obedience" (乖乖報到) | 2023 | 17 | This is MC |
| "The One For U (Not For Me)" (世一(不可一世)) (feat. Kiri T) | 2023 | 12 | This is MC (Deluxe) |
| "Floral Sea" (花海) | 2023 | — | Treble |
| "Secondary Personality" (第二人格) | 2023 | — | Treble |
| "Inhale" (抽) | 2023 | 1 | Treble |
| "Not My Problem" (與我無關) | 2023 | 1 | Treble |
| "The Last Straw" (救命稻草) | 2023 | — | Treble |

== Filmography ==
=== Television shows ===
| Year | Title | Platform | Note | Ref. |
|---|---|---|---|---|
| 2019 | King Maker II | ViuTV | Singing competition | |

=== Films ===
| Year | Title | Chinese Title | Role | Ref. |
|---|---|---|---|---|
| 2023 | One Night at School | 夜校 | Szeto (夜校) | |
| 2024 | Love Lies | 我談的那場戀愛 | Joe Lee (李偉祖) | |
| 2024 | The Prosecutor | 誤判 | Lee King-wai (李景威) | |

=== Music video appearances ===
| Year | Title | Role | Ref. |
|---|---|---|---|
| 2022 | Kiri T – "Twist Cone" | | |

== Concerts ==
| Name | Date | Venue | Note | Ref. |
|---|---|---|---|---|
| This Is Live | 22–23 October 2021 | Macpherson Stadium, Hong Kong | With Kaho Hung | |
| Have A Good Time | 13–14 December 2021 | Music Zone, KITEC | | |
| Kaho x MC Frenemy Live 2022 | 2–4 September 2022 | Star Hall, KITEC | With Kaho Hung | |
| This Is MC | 20–22 January 2023 | Hong Kong Coliseum | | |
| This Is MC Live In Macau | 30 September – 1 October 2023 | Cotai Arena | | |
| This Is MC 2 Live In Guangzhou | 29 June 2024 | Guangzhou International Sports and Performing Arts Center | | |
| This Is MC 2 Live In Foshan | 24 August 2024 | GBA International Sports and Cultural Center | | |
| This Is MC 2 Live In Malaysia | 7 September 2024 | Arena of Stars | | |
| This Is MC 2 Live In Macau | 28, 29, 31 December 2024, 4, 5 January 2025 | The Londoner Arena | | |
| This Is MC 2 Live In Dongguan | 22 February 2025 | Dongguan Sports Center | | |

=== Concert participation ===
| Name | Date | Venue | Ref. |
|---|---|---|---|
| The Next 20 Hins Live in Hong Kong | 2 January 2022 | Hong Kong Coliseum | |
| Chill Club Keep Going Concert | 24 May 2022 | Star Hall, KITEC | |
| 903 Music Green Sonic Brand New Live | 9 September 2022 | AsiaWorld–Arena, AsiaWorld–Expo | |
| UN1TED Fest 2022 | 29 October 2022 | AsiaWorld-Summit (Hall 2), AsiaWorld–Expo | |
| PUNCH Live 2023 | 11 March 2023 | AsiaWorld–Arena, AsiaWorld–Expo | |

== Awards ==
=== Music Awards ===
| Year | Award ceremony | Platform | Venue | Category | Result | Criteria |
|---|---|---|---|---|---|---|
| 2023 | Ultimate Song Chart Awards Presentation 2022 | CRHK | AsiaWorld–Arena, AsiaWorld–Expo | Best Male Singers | Bronze | CRHK Airplay |
| 2023 | Ultimate Song Chart Awards Presentation 2022 | CRHK | AsiaWorld–Arena, AsiaWorld–Expo | Top 10 Songs of the Year | No.2 – "Caution Wet Floor" | CRHK Airplay |
| 2023 | Ultimate Song Chart Awards Presentation 2022 | CRHK | AsiaWorld–Arena, AsiaWorld–Expo | Audience's Favorite Song | Final 5 – "A Gentleman's Guide to Old-Fashioned Dating" | Online Voting |
| 2022 | Ultimate Song Chart Awards Presentation 2021 | CRHK | AsiaWorld–Arena, AsiaWorld–Expo | Best Male Newcomers | Gold | CRHK Airplay |
| 2022 | Chill Club Awards 21/22 | ViuTV | Star Hall, KITEC | Best Male Newcomers | Gold | 100% from online voting |
| 2022 | Chill Club Awards 21/22 | ViuTV | Star Hall, KITEC | Top 10 Songs of the Year | No.8 – 'Pillow Talk' | 100% from online voting |
| 2022 | Hong Kong Gold Songs Award Presentation Ceremony 2021/2022 | RTHK & TVB | TVB Station | Best Male Newcomers | Silver | |
| 2022 | Hong Kong Gold Songs Award Presentation Ceremony 2021/2022 | RTHK & TVB | TVB Station | Top 10 Songs of the Year | 'Pillow Talk' | |
