= Jay Fung =

Hong Kong pop singer

Jay Fung 馮允謙
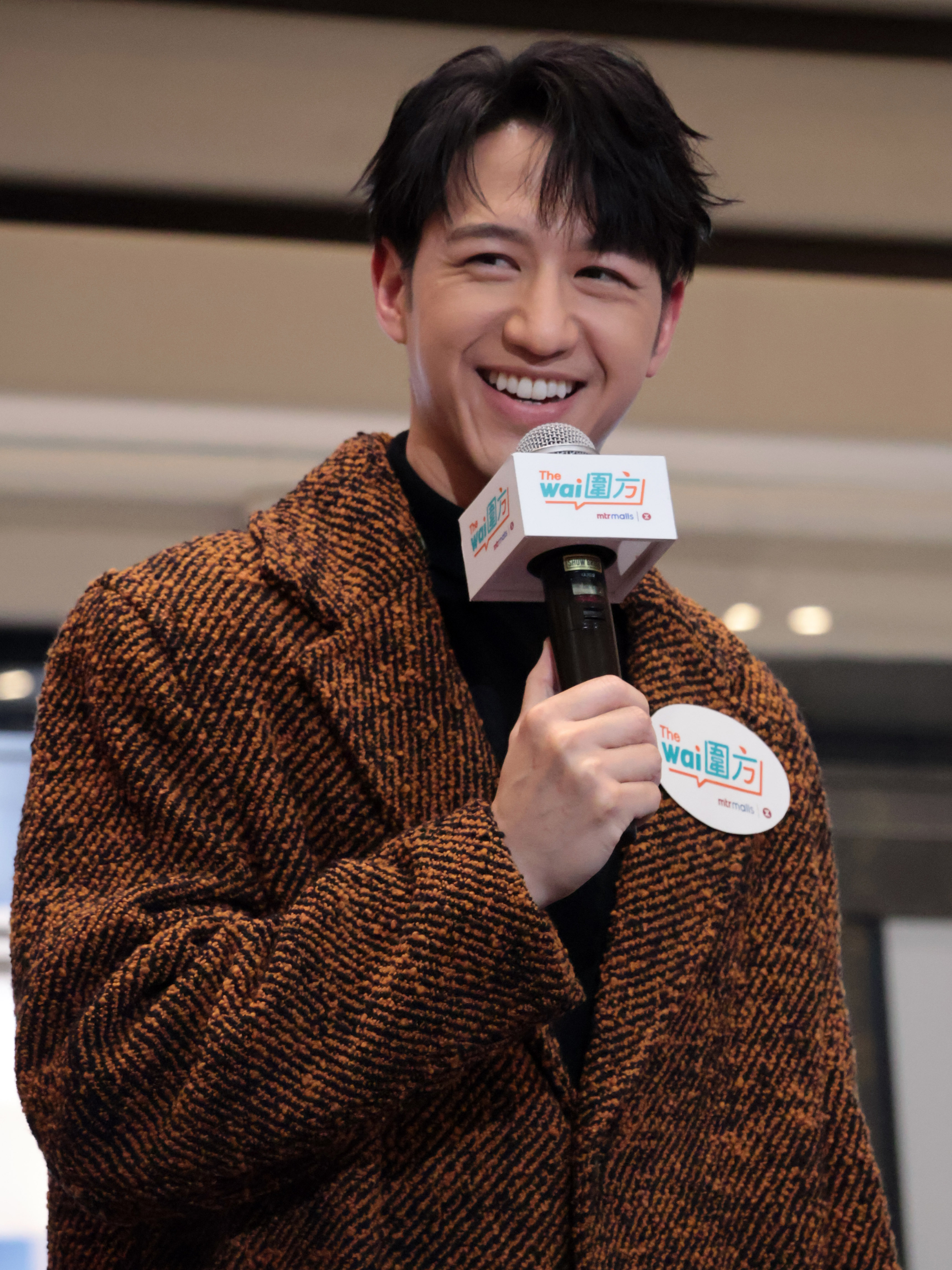
- Fung in 2023

Background information
- Born: 22 February 1988 (age 38); British Hong Kong
- Education: University of Alberta
- Genre: Cantopop
- Occupation: Singer
- Instruments: Voice, guitar, bass, drum, piano
- Years active: 2011–present
- Label: Media Asia Music

Chinese name
- Traditional Chinese: 馮允謙
Transcriptions
Standard Mandarin
- Hanyu Pinyin: Féng Yǔnqiān

Jay Fung (Chinese: 馮允謙; born 22 February 1988) is a Hong Kong and Canadian singer-songwriter. He won the 1st runner up in The Voice 3. Born in Hong Kong and raised in Edmonton, Canada, his style of singing is deeply influenced by Western pop music. He signed a contract with Music Plus Label at 2012 and debuted with the song "Starting From Today" (今天開始). In 2018, he joined Media Asia Music.

== Early life and education ==
Fung was born on 22 February 1988 in British Hong Kong. He emigrated to Edmonton, Canada with his family when he was one-and-a-half years old. He graduated from the University of Alberta majoring in Marketing.

== Career ==
Fung began learning the guitar at the age of 13. In 2011, Fung competed in the 3rd season of The Voice, placing as the final runner-up. He officially joined Music Plus Label, part of Imperial Entertainment Group, in 2012. On 12 November 2012, he released his first album, Starting From Today.

In 2017, Fung collaborated with T-ma to compose and produce the theme song "Hong Kong, My Home" for the 20th anniversary of the establishment of the Hong Kong Special Administrative Region.

In 2018, Fung officially joined Media Asia Music. The following year, he launched the "Voice navigation" (聲音導航) to lead music fans to escape from the hustle and bustle;"Backwoods" (山旮旯, tentative name) teaches people to love in time"Full Moon Party" has a strong folk jazz style; The MV of "Finding for Buckingham" was filmed in Vladivostok, Russia, and Feanna Wong Shuk Man was invited to sing "Finding Buckingham: You're My Buckingham" to express the feeling of waiting for the lover to come to shore. The four songs are included in the EP "Detour" released in 2020, the EP also became one of the top ten local albums selected by the editors of the streaming music platform KKBox.

In 2020, in addition to "Detour" at the beginning of the year, Fung also released his second EP "Awaken" at the end of the year. The latter includes four station champion songs "Last 7 Days" (開始倒數) and "Beyond the Stars" (地球來的人), which have a stronger science fiction element, telling the story of the end of the world and human migration to other planets, so the cover design of "Awaken" also has a futuristic feel. "Beyond the Stars" was selected by KKBox editors as one of the top ten local songs of the year, it also won the "Best Song" award at the Metro Hot Awards 2020 and 2020 903 Music Awards ranked fifth in the "Professional Recommendation. 903 Top Ten". With his outstanding performance that year, Fung also won the silver medals for the "Hit Songs Singer-Songwriter" and "Hit Songs Male Singer" categories at 903 Awards Ceremony, winning a total of three awards.

In 2021, Fung launched a three-part series of "Vampire Love Story" MVs: "Miss Somebody" (思念即地獄) describes the pain of missing someone in a Long-distance relationship; "Love Crime" (因愛之罪名) has a retro style and tells the story of love that is not accepted by the public; "Sorry" (一步一悔過), which was written when a person felt guilty after a quarrel with his girlfriend during his career low. Among the three songs, "Missing Somebody" became the champion song of four stations (903, RTHK. 997, and ViuTV); at the end of the year, it won the "Best Song" at the New Town Hot Awards 2021, and became one of the top ten local singles selected by the KKBox editors of the year. "LIFE / LINE" is also one of the top ten local albums carefully selected by KKBox editors. Fung won the silver award for "Singer-Songwriter of the Year" in the Chill Club Recommendation Chart Annual Recommendation 21/22, and won the gold award for "Hong Kong Gold Songs CASH Songwriter" at the Hong Kong Gold Songs Awards 2021/2022.

Besides his songs, Fung served as a guest mentor on TVB's music talent show "The Voice of Dreams" in episodes 10 and 11 earlier this year. In episode 10, his duet with Archie Sin Ching-fung on Lui Fong's song "The Rustling Rain" received the highest score of the entire episode. Furthermore, Fung collaborated with Ian Chan on the "I Am Live" concert 002 in August,, and with Janice Vidal for the "BACK TO THE NEW SKOOL" concert in October, both held at the Star Hall of the Kowloon Bay International Trade & Exhibition Centre.

== Discography ==
Album

- Brand New Start (2012)
- Tu Es Digne D'amour (2013)
- The In-Between (2014)
- Odyssey (2015)
- Coexistence (2016)
- Detour (2020)
- Awaken (2020)
- Life / Line (2021)
- Love & Loss (2022)
- Emo (2024)

Single

- Bring Out Ya Fire (2023)
- Searching For Sugar Man (2023)
- Yes, I Know I Know (2023)
- You Are Mine For Life (2023)

== Concerts ==
Year	Date	Name	Venue	Note
2023	25-26 March	Jaypop Live@Coliseum	Hong Kong Coliseum	

== Filmography ==
=== Films ===
Year	Title	Notes/Ref.
TBA	An Abandoned Team	

=== Television shows ===
Year	Title	Network	Role	Note
2011	The Voice 3	TVB	Contestant	Silver
2021	King Maker IV	ViuTV	Judge	EP28-31
2023	King Maker V	ViuTV	Mentor	

=== Music video appearances ===
Year	Title
2015	Girls' Sample - "Simple Girl"

== Songwriting works for other singers ==
As Composer:

- "DWBF" by Ian Chan (2021)
- "Overruled" by MC Cheung (2021)
- "You Made My Day" by Ansonbean (2021)
- "Long D" by Jace Chan (2022)
- "The One For U" by MC Cheung (2023)

== Awards and nominations ==
Year	Award ceremony	Platform	Venue	Category	Result
2023	Ultimate Song Chart Awards Presentation 2022	CRHK	AsiaWorld–Arena, AsiaWorld–Expo	Best Male Singers	Silver
2023	Ultimate Song Chart Awards Presentation 2022	CRHK	AsiaWorld–Arena, AsiaWorld–Expo	Best Singer-songwriters	Silver
2023	Ultimate Song Chart Awards Presentation 2022	CRHK	AsiaWorld–Arena, AsiaWorld–Expo	Top 10 Songs of the Year	No.10 - "Freakin' Nightmare"
2022	Ultimate Song Chart Awards Presentation 2021	CRHK	AsiaWorld–Arena, AsiaWorld–Expo	Best Male Singers	Bronze
2022	Ultimate Song Chart Awards Presentation 2021	CRHK	AsiaWorld–Arena, AsiaWorld–Expo	Best Singer-songwriters	Silver
