= Chochukmo =

Hong Kong indie rock band

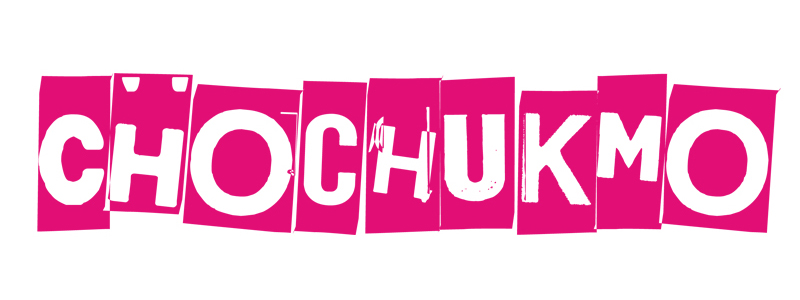

Background information
- Origin: Hong Kong
- Genres: Indie rock
- Years active: 2005–present
- Labels: Unsigned
- Members: Jan Curious (vocal); Mike Orange (guitar/keyboard); Les Hunter (guitar); Tom Wong (bass); Kitty Trouble (drum)

Chochukmo (Chinese: 觸執毛) is a 5-piece indie rock band based in Hong Kong, with Jan Curious on vocal, Mike Orange on guitar and synthesizer, Les Hunter on guitar, Tom Wong on bass, and Kitty Trouble on drums and percussion.

They performed at TONE Music Festival 2022 in AsiaWorld–Arena, Hong Kong.

== Discography ==
- The Underground: Something Alternative #1 (compilation) (20 September 2008)
- The King Lost His Pink (28 November 2009)
- "Good Night" (single) (26 May 2012)
- A Tragedy Your Majesty (12 October 2013)

== Sources ==
- Fitzpatrick, Liam (15 February 2010). "Loose Canon". Time. Review of The King Lost His Pink.
- Shamdasani, Pavan (21 October 2009). "Clockenflap Festival: Try a Little Grass". Time.
- CNNGo: The Hong Kong Hot List: 20 People to watch
- CNNGo: What's that sound? Chochukmo
- Bitetone: The King Lost His Pink Album Review
- Bitetone: The Pink Is Back: Chochukmo Interview
