= Terence Lam =

Hong Kong composer, singer-songwriter, and record producer

Terence Lam 林家謙
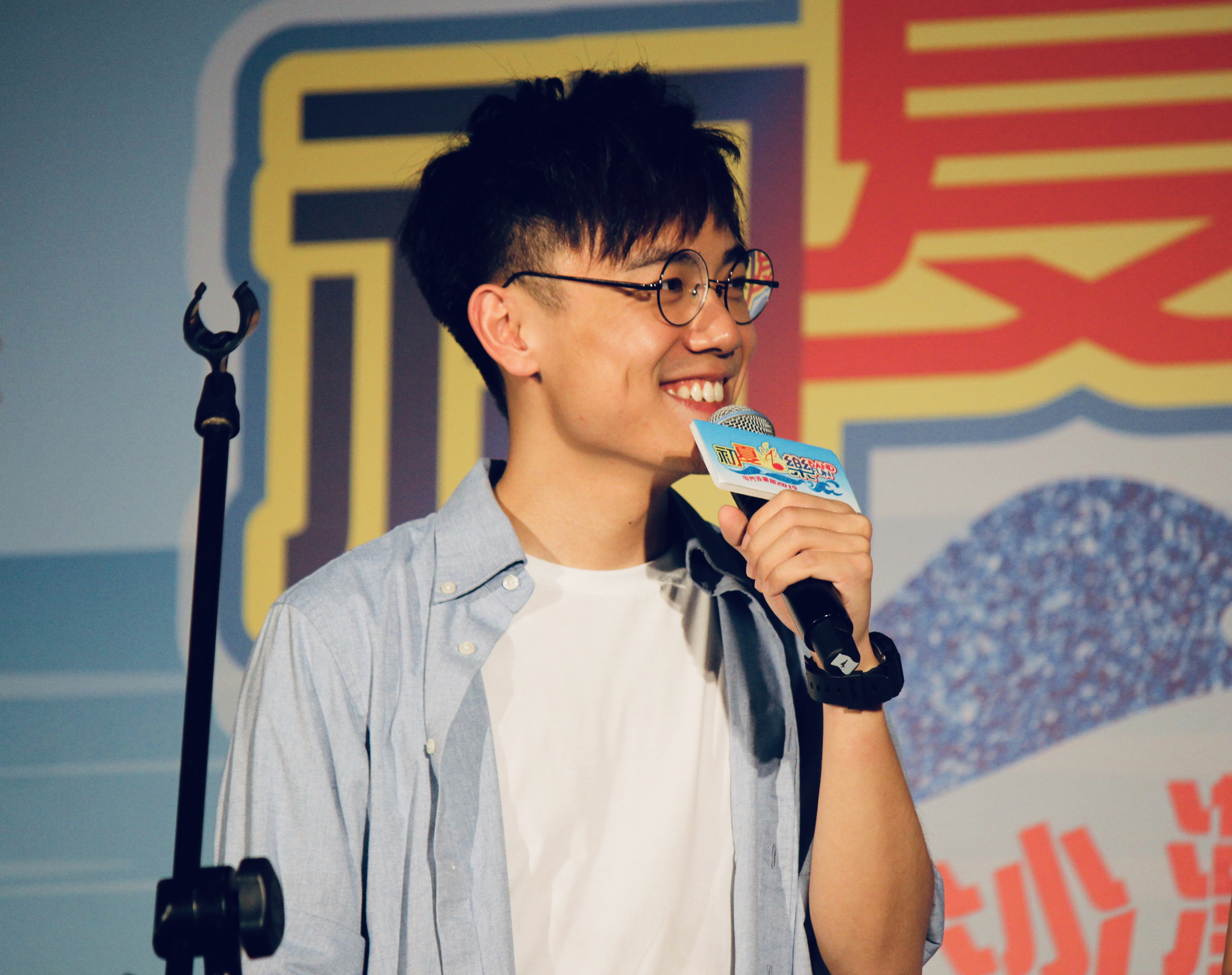
- Lam in 2019

Background information
- Also known as: Terence Lam Ka-mint
- Born: 3 September 1991 (age 34); British Hong Kong
- Education: Lingnan University (B.A.)
- Genres: Pop; Cantopop
- Instruments: Piano (Grade 5); Guitar
- Years active: 2014–present
- Website: https://www.terencelam0903.com/

Chinese name
- Traditional Chinese: 林家謙
- Simplified Chinese: 林家谦
Transcriptions
Standard Mandarin
- Hanyu Pinyin: Lín Jiāqiān
Yue: Cantonese
- Jyutping: Lam^{4} Gaa^{1} Him^{1}

Terence Lam Ka-him (Chinese: 林家謙; born 3 September 1991) is a Hong Kong composer, singer-songwriter, and record producer. Lam had a musical interest since a young age, which he started to learn playing the piano when he was four or five years old. He attended the Lingnan University, where he received the Bachelor of Arts (Honours) in Contemporary English Studies in 2013. During his university studies, Lam participated in several college singing competitions, where he met the singer-songwriter Chet Lam who brought him into the music industry. In 2014, he became a composer, signing a contract for Warner Chappell Music Hong Kong where at one point he was composing one song a week.

Lam has composed songs for the singers Eason Chan, Jason Chan, Hins Cheung, Pakho Chau, JW, Charmaine Fong, Alfred Hui, Eman Lam, Janice Vidal, Rainie Yang, and Joey Yung. Pakho Chau's 2014 song "About Us" (關於我們) was Lam's first composition to achieve commercial success. Lam's composition of the JW song "A Lifetime of Contradictions" (矛盾一生) was the first to receive widespread attention. Lam's songs are in the traditional genres of pop music and Cantopop though he puts his own twist on his songs through tempo changes and melody trends.

In 2019, Lam made a career change from being a composer to being a singer-songwriter. In January of that year, he released the song "NEXT" (下一位前度), which hit several charts and became the first song that made him well-known as a singer. The next year, he released "Solitude" (一人之境), which was broadly praised. In May 2020, he released his debut album, Major in Minor whose name was inspired by how he is an independent musician. Although he writes songs for a record label, he remains an independent singer who is not signed to a label or a talent manager. Lam has received composer, arranger, and singer awards from RTHK, Ultimate 903, and ViuTV. He received the best composer award from RTHK in 2016 and 2017, the best new artist award from Ultimate 903 in 2020, and the best composer, best arranger, and best male singer awards from the ViuTV Chill Club awards in 2021.

== Early and personal life ==
Lam was born on 3 September 1991 in Hong Kong. Born to a moderately well-off family, he has three brothers and is the youngest child in the family, one of whom is a grade eight pianist who provides him suggestions when he composes music. Lam started learning piano when he was around four to five years old and achieved ABRSM grade five ultimately. As a child, he enjoyed music and completed at a Wan Chai District music competition when he was around six to seven years old. At the age of 14 to 15, he spent HKD$700 (US$90.09) to purchase a microphone and mixing console online, which he used the equipment to start recording music covers to share online. Lam is an Introvert. When he was in secondary school and university, Lam felt he lacked control and the ownership of his voice and did not respect nor felt confident in his own singing. He stopped singing for a brief period of time due to his lack of confidence in controlling his voice after experiencing his voice change during his puberty. Lam attended St Joseph's College, a Catholic boys' secondary school in Hong Kong. He is also an alumnus of Hong Kong Sze Yap Commercial and Industrial Association Wong Tai Shan Memorial College, where he completed his sixth form studies. He is 171 cm (5 ft 7 in) tall. Lam graduated in 2013 from Lingnan University, where he received an honours Bachelor of Arts degree in Contemporary English studies. The reason he studied English in university was due to English being his best performed A-level subject. While at university, he and a female student sang in a university singing contest and an interuniversity singing contest, where he won the first place in both competitions. Mentioning in an interview that he has somewhat of a Buddha-like mindset, Lam was last in a relationship when he was 25 or 26 years old. Lam lives with his family. Prior to entering the music industry, Lam worked at a technology company.

== Music career ==
=== 2014–2019: Start of composing career ===
Lam entered the music industry in 2014 as a songwriter with Chet Lam's help. They met at a university singing competition where Chet Lam was a guest performer. Chet Lam liked Terence Lam's work, and they signed an agreement to have the latter write songs for the former. Lam subsequently signed a contract with Warner Music Group to be a composer, where at one point, he was composing one song a week for the company. The singer Pakho Chau's 2014 song "About Us" (關於我們) was the first of Lam's compositions to achieve commercial success. "About Us" was Lam's fifth or sixth demo. His composition of the JW song "A Lifetime of Contradictions" (矛盾一生) was the first to be widely noticed. JW's singing of "A Lifetime of Contradiction", which received over 18 million views, revitalised her previously flagging career. Lam subsequently finished two more songs for JW: "How Many Years" (多少年) and "Free to Soar" (自由飛翔). When he began composing songs, Lam was a huge fan of the Taiwanese singer Yoga Lin and Lam sent him a message with demos of songs he had composed on social media. Lin performed some of Lam's songs which led to the two forming a strong bond. Songs composed by Lam that were sung by Lin include "Bad and Worse" (壞與更壞), which was Lin's first Cantonese song, and "Do Not Forget You" (勿忘你). In 2016 and 2017, Lam received the composer award at RTHK's "Top Ten Chinese Gold Songs Award" ceremony.

According to HK01, he has collaborated with most of Hong Kong's singers who are currently active in the industry. He has written songs for the singers Charmaine Fong, Pakho Chau, JW, Alfred Hui, Jason Chan, Joey Yung, Hins Cheung, Janice Vidal, and Eman Lam. Lam composed Joey Yung's song "The Science of Heart" (心之科學), which received an Ultimate 903 award in 2018. Lam composed Hong Kong singer Miriam Yeung's song "Cherie Yu" (余春嬌), Eman Lam's song "Love Is A French Dessert" (愛情是一種法國甜品), and Taiwanese singer Rainie Yang's "Showing One's Incompetence" (獻醜), Alfred Hui's "Single" (單數), and Hins Cheung's "Diving" (潛水). It takes him roughly one day to write a song. With his elder brother, he manages a music production company. His duties include making new music available for purchase and for radio broadcasts. He established Terence Lam Production & Company to assist him in retaining the copyright over his compositions.

=== 2019: Start of singing career ===
In 2019, he began his singing career after participating in a singing contest. That year, he did a Mandarin duet for a movie theme song with JC of the song "Lost In Love" (如影隨心), which sparked his desire to do more singing. In January 2019, he released the song "NEXT" (下一位前度), the first song that made him well-known as a singer. The song hit several major charts. Lam collaborated with Christopher Chak on the song's composition. Chak suggested including vocal music and inversion in the piece which demonstrated Lam's musical abilities. In 2019, Lam wrote and sang the songs "just carry on" and "Listen to Wind" (聽風), the latter of which he also arranged. The two songs did not receive as much as attention as "NEXT". For "just carry on", Lam said that the song likens people to flowers that bloom at different times. Its message is that people do not need to compare themselves with each other. The song's music video features four new actors including Rachel Leung and Will Or to accompany Lam in acting various scenes of people being in a "collapsed state". As Lam had trouble acting in the scenes, the directors needed to have everyone leave before filming his parts.

Lam composed fewer songs in 2019 than he did in previous years as he was adjusting to becoming a performer and as his energies were focused on promoting his work and planning. He composed two or three songs that year. During the 2019 Ultimate Song Chart Awards hosted by Commercial Radio Hong Kong, Lam received the best new artist award.

=== 2020: Major in Minor and "Terence's Adventures in Wonderland" ===
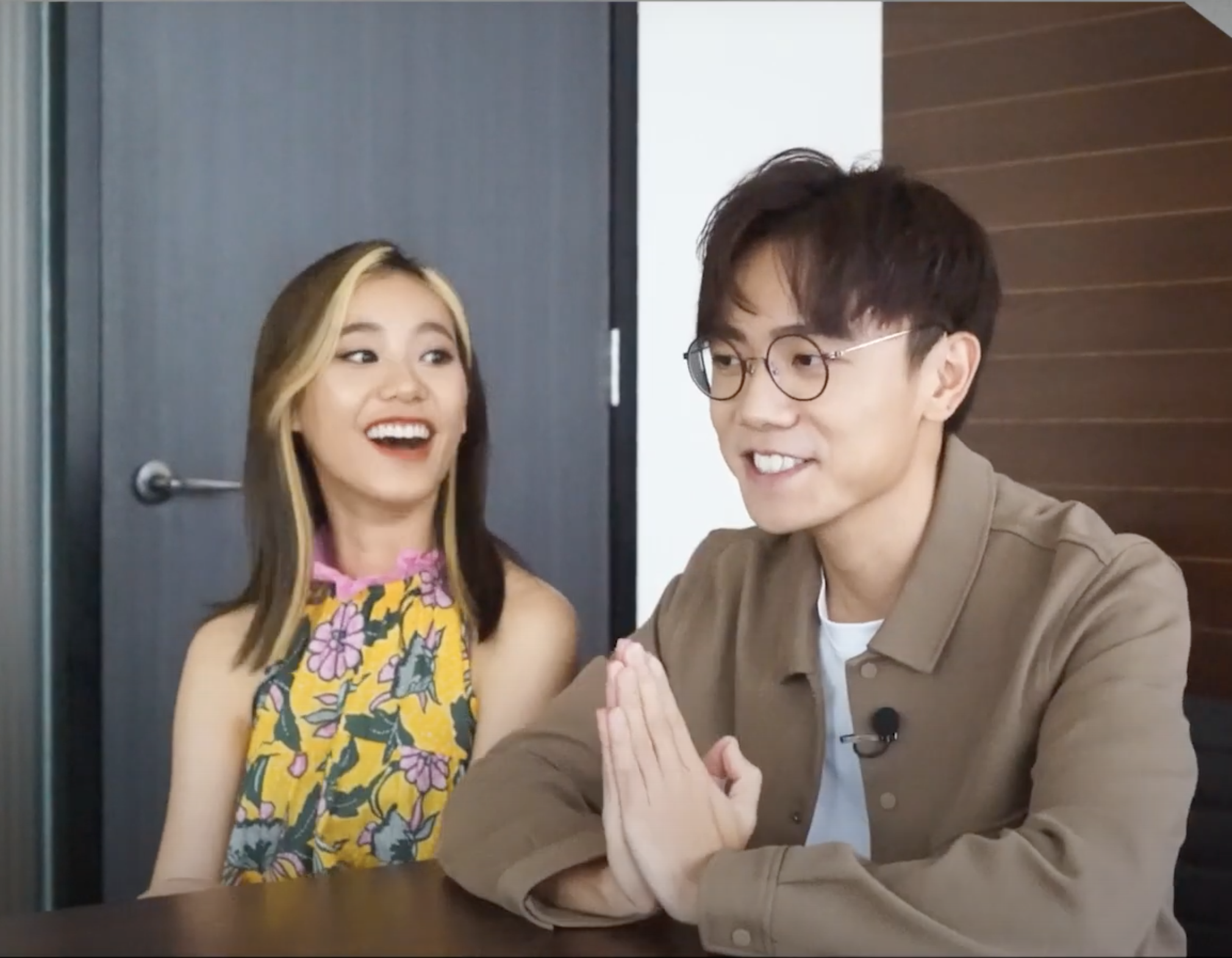
Terence Lam with Jace Chan in an am730 interview in October 2020. The duo sang a duet of the song "Quarantine".

In 2020, he released a favourably reviewed song titled "In a Funk" (拼命無恙), which detailed a love rectangle. Owing to its topic, rhythm, and melody, listeners considered it a sequel to his previous song "NEXT". The song's lyrics were written by Albert Leung. "Solitude" (一人之境), the next song he released, was "widely acclaimed". The song's lyrics expounded on the loneliness common in life and came at a particularly timely moment during the COVID-19 pandemic when people were social distancing. Lam wrote the lyrics, composed, arranged the music, and produced the song. He had composed the song as an unused demo five or six years prior to its release and reused it for himself to sing. Hong Kong Economic Times reviewer Chan Ka Yin found the song reminded herself as a woman in her 40s to spend more personal time on herself and do more introspection. Writing in The Loop, music critic Yannie Chan said "Solitude" "features an addictive melody and meaningful lyrics celebrating the art of enjoying time by yourself".

In May 2020, Lam released his first extended play titled Major in Minor. The name "Major in Minor" comes from listeners' experiencing contradictory sensations when hearing Lam's songs. His motivational song might make people feel a tinge of sadness, while his sad song might make them feel inspired. The name also is inspired by how Lam is making mainstream music as an independent musician. Lam spent in the six figures to self-finance the EP. After the EP sold out in less than two weeks, Lam decided not to release additional copies, which made the EP go out of print. His decision was because he didn't want additional copies to make his work sell poorly and as a result have to be sold at a discount. This led to sales on online auction companies to reach several thousand dollars. The EP was released with two covers: one in blue and one in orange. One website offered to sell both versions of Lam's EP at HKD$2,800 (US$360.36), which was a tenfold increase from the original price. Lam initially had reservations about making the EP as he was uncertain about whether people would still buy physical copies of albums. Furthermore, his songs were usually about different topics, leading him to be uncertain about how to tie the songs together. After he heard from his fans that his songs had many common characteristics, he within a month took his five most recent compositions, added his demo cover of "Solitude", and composed some simple music to connect them together to create the EP. He inserted "after the party" before "Solitude" so that the audience could experience the bustling sensation of a party. The album's other songs are "NEXT", "just carry on", "Listen to Wind", and "In a Funk". He made an agreement with the music platform Joox to release Major in Minor under its Joox Original project. The platform had an exclusive licence to stream the album. SPILL music critic Fan Wong found that "the songs were all high quality but they were inevitably lacking in freshness" since they had previously been released. Lam's songs "NEXT" and "just carry on" have "unexpected, staggered notes and hard-to-touch beats", which critic Wong said have become Lam's trademark. His songs "Listen to Wind" and "In a Funk" made Wong think of the sophisti-pop genre in making people ponder and have feelings of refinement.

In the later half of 2020, Lam released the song "Terence's Adventures in Wonderland" (特倫斯夢遊仙境). The song has a scale with a 24-note range. With a fast tempo and playful tone, it is much faster than Lam's typical slow-paced songs. HK01 compared the song's main character, Terence, to Alice from the children's novel Alice's Adventures in Wonderland. The song describes how Terence encounters witches and snow beasts upon entering a dream world. The witches tell him that those who exist in the dream world are people who cannot live in a sober world. He sings and parties with the villagers. After waking up, he cannot rediscover the descending stairs that took him to the dream world. He takes out a pen to record the song he had sung with the villagers. For the music video, Lam took the unconventional approach of hiring the illustrator The Odd Little World and the animator Sundae Service to animate Terence's adventures in the dream world. An HK01 music critic said that while Lam's previous songs largely had a pessimistic theme, "Terence's Adventures in Wonderland" is "a breakthrough" in being different and "proves that he can cater to the market and to the public while insisting on his own style".

Lam performed a live in-studio duet of the song "Quarantine" (隔離) with Jace Chan. On 13 November 2020, Lam released "Turning Back the Clock in One Sentence" (時光倒流一句話. The song's theme is regret and it is influenced by a 1980s atmosphere. It received more than a million views in less than half a month. In 2020, he composed two songs for Eason Chan: "A Dance for Tomorrow" (致明日的舞) and "Love Casually, Randomly" (是但求其愛). Regarding the latter song, which Lam produced, Chan praised Lam for his unconventional composition and for using a trombone instead of a trumpet. When Lam was at the early stage as a composer, Lam sent his music demos to Chan even though at the time the two were not acquainted. Following an encounter at a private party, they started talking again in 2017.

=== 2021–present: Ultimate Song Chart and Chill Club awards ===
During the 2020 Ultimate Song Chart Awards hosted on 1 January 2021, Lam received the bronze award for best male singer as well as the best composer award. He ranked among the top five in the fan-voted "My Favourite Male Singer" award, which Keung To won. During the awards ceremony, Lam played the guitar and sang his song "Terence's Adventures in Wonderland". In contrast to most of the other male attendees who wore suits, Lam wore a less formal Mike Amiri "multicolour souvenir patchwork hoodie" and a Paul Smith shirt with colourful striped patterns to match his performance that night of his song "Terence's Adventures in Wonderland", to make it easier to play the guitar, and to make himself more comfortable and relaxed. As an independent artist, he chooses his own outfits to wear at award ceremonies instead of relying on a team to help him with the decisions. After Lam's awards at the 2020 Ultimate Song Chart Awards, U Lifestyle called Lam "the fastest rising male singer in Hong Kong's music scene". Owing to the COVID-19 pandemic, Lam had a lower income and fewer performing opportunities so he had more time to compose songs. In January 2021, three of Lam's songs ranked in KKBox's top 20 ranking of songs streamed on the platform: "Solitude" ranked third, "In a Funk" ranked 13th, and "Quarantine" ranked 14th. In March 2021, while the pro-democracy supporter Ventus Lau was incarcerated at Stanley Prison, Lau listened to Lam's songs and worked on rewriting the songs' lyrics. In April 2021, he rewrote the lyrics of Lam's most recent song, "The Magical Confused Potion" (神奇的糊塗魔藥).

At the ViuTV Chill Club Awards ceremony on 18 April 2021, Lam received six awards including for his song "Solitude" as the best song. He also received awards for best composer, best arranger and best male singer. When Lam went on the stage, no one was there to present the award to him, and he said "you get the award yourself, very casual". Lam was poker-faced and was reluctant to give speeches after receiving the awards. His behaviour at the award ceremony led critics to call him "arrogant" and "disrespectful", and to question why he became a singer instead of remaining a behind-the-scenes composer. Lam's supporters responded that he was very introverted and like many other entertainers were at a loss for words in prominent settings. A day after the awards ceremony, he released a statement thanking ViuTV and his fans, saying "there is a lot of room for learning and improvement in expressing myself". In April 2021, Lam performed as a featured singer at Ronald Cheng's concert.

== Artistry ==
Lam's songs are in the traditional genres of pop music and Cantopop though he puts his own twist on his songs through tempo changes and melody trends. He "takes the Cantopop route through and through, making it friends and unique". Lam expressed interest in making an album of Mandarin songs. He said that if he could get non-Cantonese speakers to become his fans, they might listen to his Cantonese songs too. Lam referenced as an example Eason Chan, who released Mandarin songs that attracted a substantial Taiwanese fanbase who listened to his Cantonese songs too.

Before he entered the music industry, Lam did not receive a formal singing education. He did not take singing lessons because he thought of singing as a way to express the performer's emotions and that it would not be ideal if everyone learned to sing in the same way. Lam said that owing to his lack of music training, he might not be a technically strong singer. He felt that did not matter as much if he were able to emotionally inspire his listeners. He initially did not plan to become a singer as he wanted to experience being a creator who worked behind the scenes.

Although Lam signed an agreement with a record label for the music he composes, for his singing, Lam remains as an independent musician who has not signed with a record label or talent manager. He enjoyed the freedom in being able to make songs in his own way without considering other people's opinions. Signing with a record label would require him to make compromises. He composes, arranges, and directs songs in which he is the main singer. Lam is solely responsible for choosing which singers he will collaborate with next and connecting with them.

== Reception ==
K Law of U Lifestyle found that Lam had "special timbre, an introverted singing voice, and was good at transcribing the songs with varying degrees of play". am730 said that Lam had "a special voice and unique and alluring vocals". SPILL music critic Fan Wong said that Lam's critics largely focus on his singing. Wong said that although Lam is not one of the technically strongest singers, he is "not bad at all" in that area. The critic concluded that "the combination of Lam's elegant singing and his traditional yet embellished with the unconventional performance makes him so memorable". An Apple Daily music critic said Lam has received criticism for having "a dull voice, like a robot with no emotions".

== Discography ==
- Major in Minor (2020)
- SEVEN (stylised as (seven)^{7}) (2021)
- MEMENTO (2022)
- ISFP (2024)
- Camouflage (2024)
- Evergreen (2025)
- Five Easy Pieces (2026)

== Filmography ==
=== Television shows ===
Year	Title	Network	Note
2023	Where Do Do you go	HOYTV	
