= Kowloonbay International Trade & Exhibition Centre =

Building in Hong Kong

Coordinates: 22°19′26″N 114°12′13″E

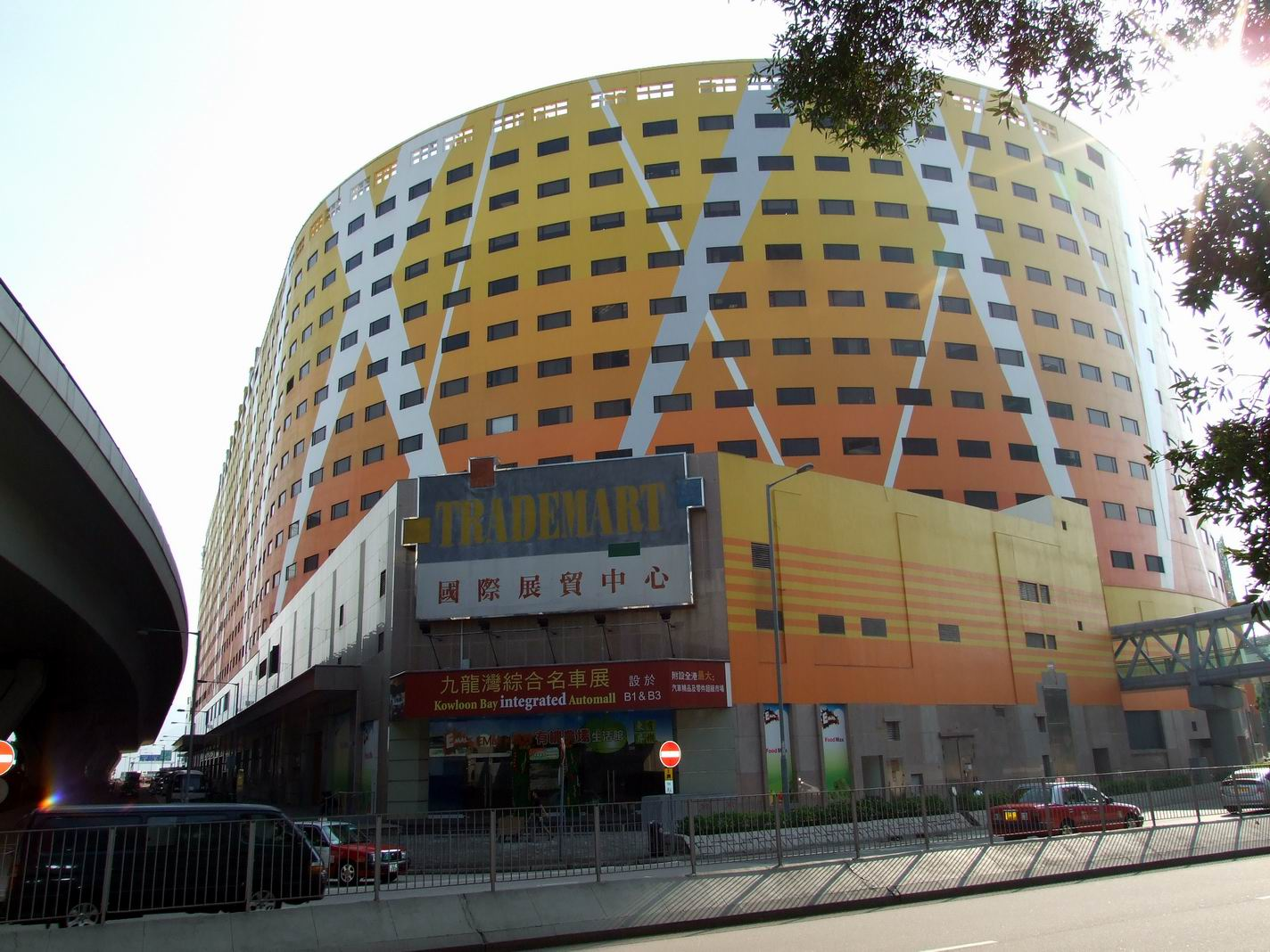
- Kowloonbay International Trade & Exhibition Centre (pictured 2007)
- Traditional Chinese: 九龍灣國際展貿中心
- Simplified Chinese: 九龙湾国际展贸中心
Transcriptions
Standard Mandarin
- Hanyu Pinyin: Jiǔlóng Wān Guójì Zhǎn Mào Zhōngxīn
Yue: Cantonese
- Yale Romanization: Gáu lùhng wāan gwok jai jín mauh jūng sām
- Jyutping: Gau2 lung4 waan1 gwok3 zai3 zin2 mau6 zung1 sam1

Hong Kong International Trade and Exhibition Centre
- Traditional Chinese: 香港國際展貿中心
- Simplified Chinese: 香港国际展贸中心
Transcriptions
Standard Mandarin
- Hanyu Pinyin: Xiānggǎng Guójì Zhǎn Mào Zhōngxīn
Yue: Cantonese
- Yale Romanization: Hēung góng gwok jai jín mauh jūng sām
- Jyutping: Hoeng1 gong2 gwok3 zai3 zin2 mau6 zung1 sam1

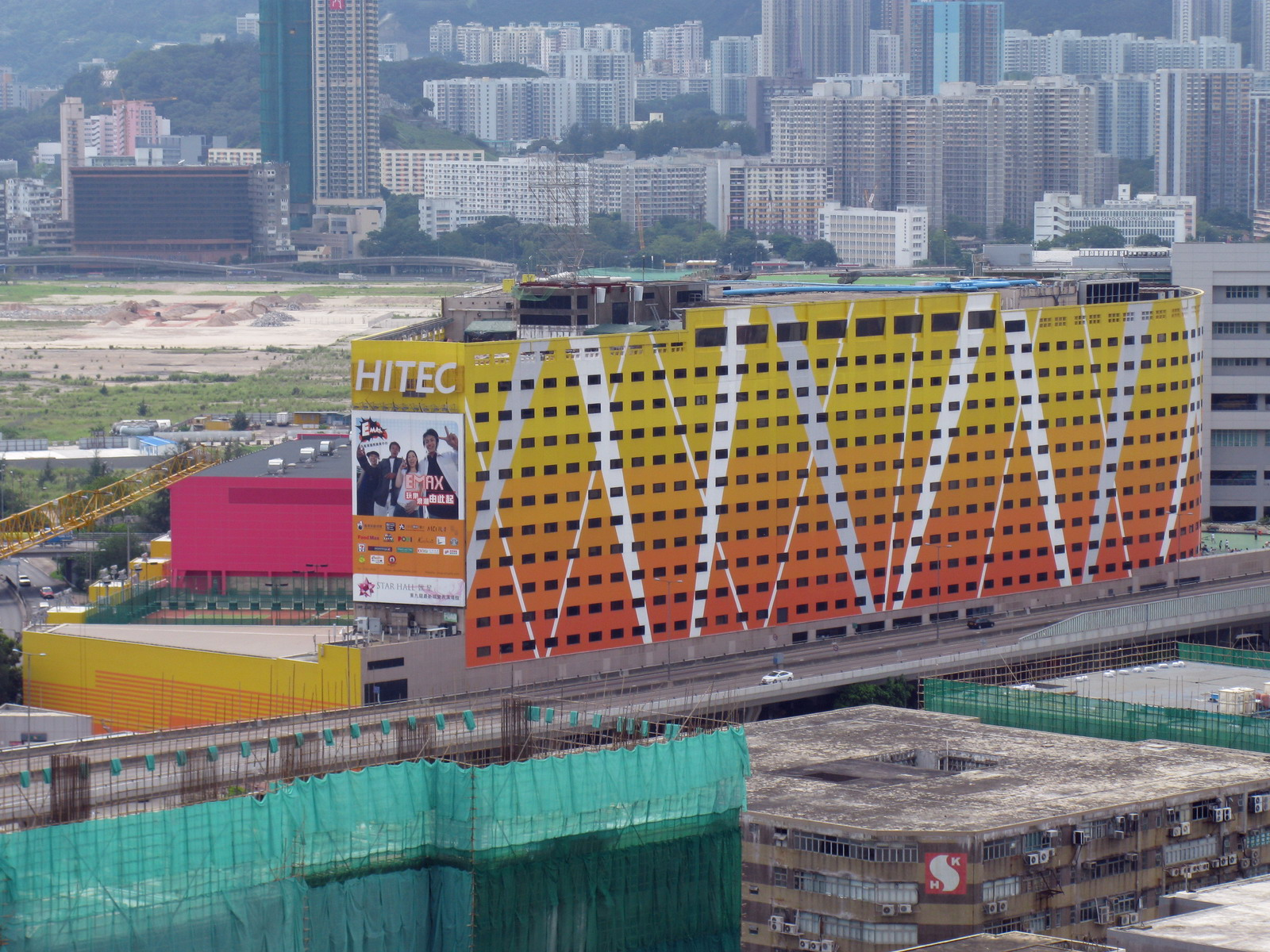
KITEC, with the site of the former Kai Tak Airport in the background

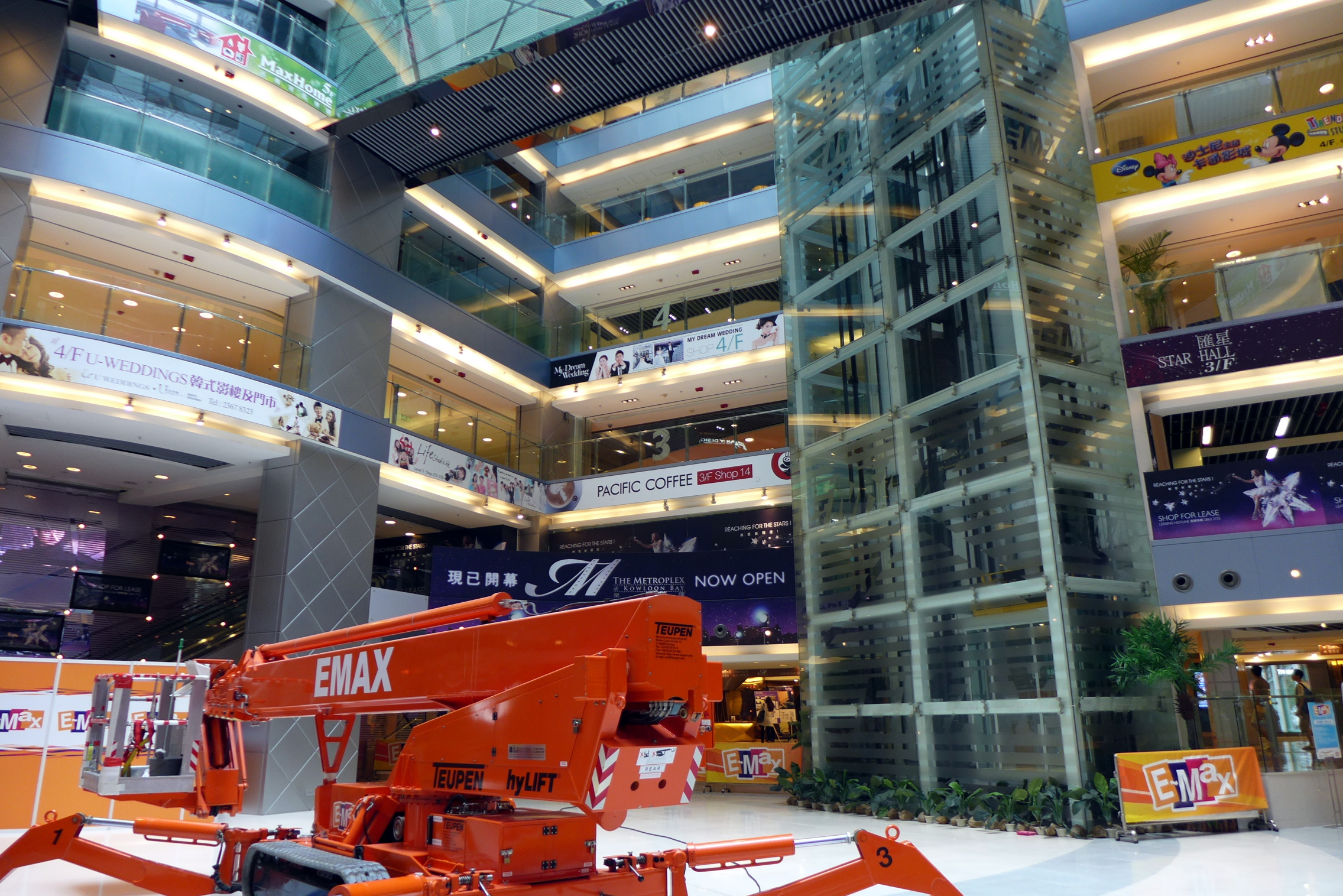
E-Max shopping mall

The Kowloonbay International Trade & Exhibition Centre (KITEC, formerly known as the Hong Kong International Trade and Exhibition Centre or HITEC), was an exhibition centre, shopping mall and performance venue situated at 1 Trademart Drive, Kowloon Bay, Kowloon, Hong Kong. It was developed by Hopewell Holdings Ltd.

In 2021, a consortium led by Billion Development bought the venue for $1.4 billion US dollars to redevelop it into three grade-A office buildings. As a result, the KITEC ended its operations at 5pm on 30 June 2024.

== Facilities ==
=== Convention and exhibition spaces ===
Multi-functional venues, including Music Zone @ E-Max, Rotunda 1, Rotunda 2, Rotunda 3 and Star Hall, can accommodate exhibitions, concerts, banquets and business functions. There was an auditorium with 702 tiered seats and a conference centre with 17 meeting rooms on the 6th and 7th floors.

=== E-Max shopping mall ===
The mall provides dining in the forms of Chinese and western restaurants and cafés. Major tenants included:

- Hong Kong Bowling City
- Kowloon Bay Integrated Auto Mall
- Premier Home Forum
- PetMax
- Starbucks
- The Metroplex, self-operated independent cinema with 9 screens and a total capacity of over 1,100 people, G/F. (Opened on 14 February 2014)

=== Offices ===
The centre offers office spaces ranging from 56 m^{2} (600 sq ft) to an entire floor of 9,300 m^{2} (100,000 sq ft).

It has included several divisions of the Registration and Electoral Office.

=== Star Hall ===
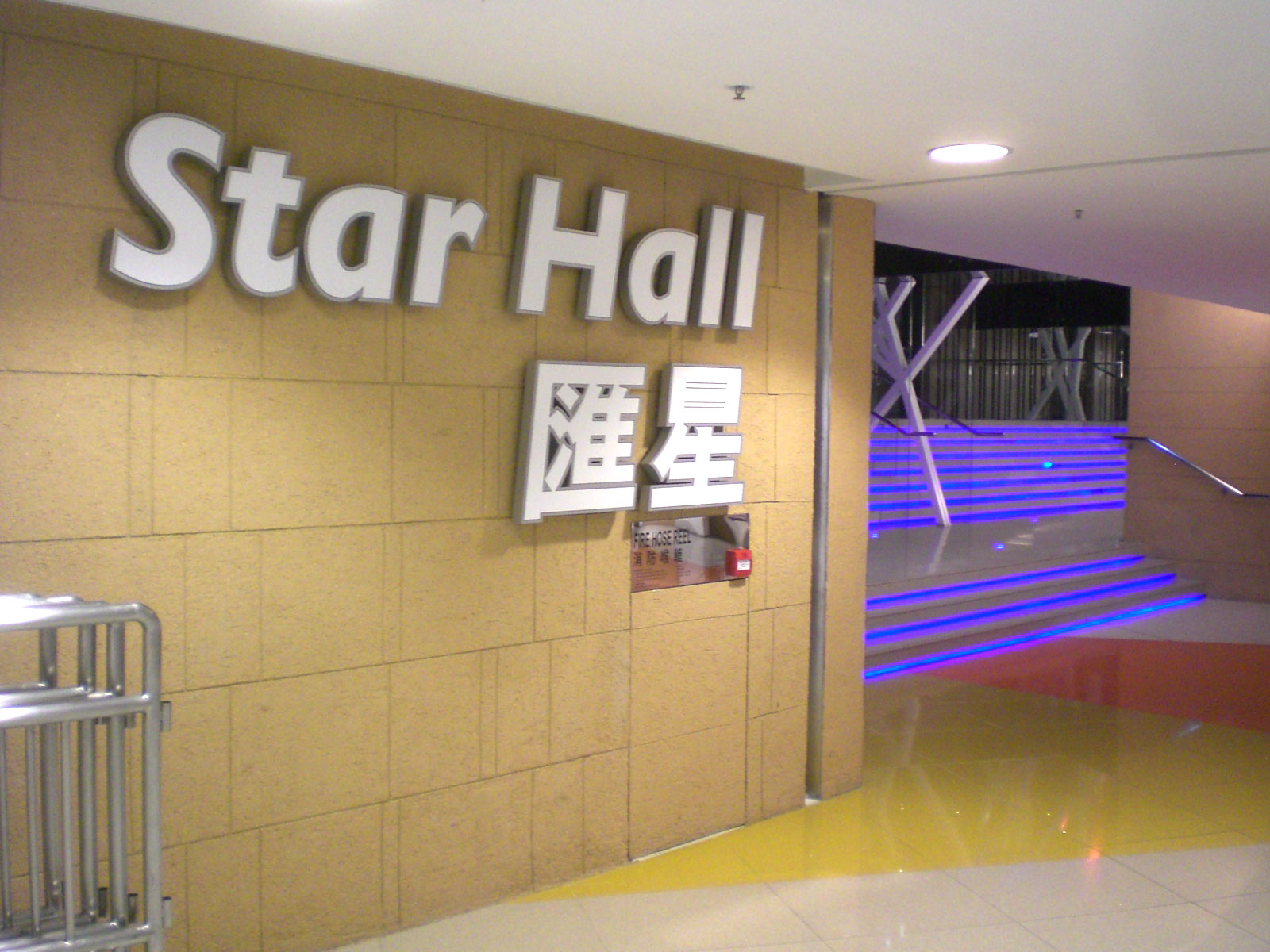
Star Hall

Star Hall (匯星) was the performance venue inside KITEC. It can accommodate audiences of 3,600 people. It was a popular venue for concerts. The 4-storey Star Hall measuring 2,800 m^{2} (30,000 sq ft) offers column-free space.

== Notable Events ==
- FanFan - We Are Friends Concerts - August 21, 2009
