= Dear Jane (band) =

Hong Kong boy band

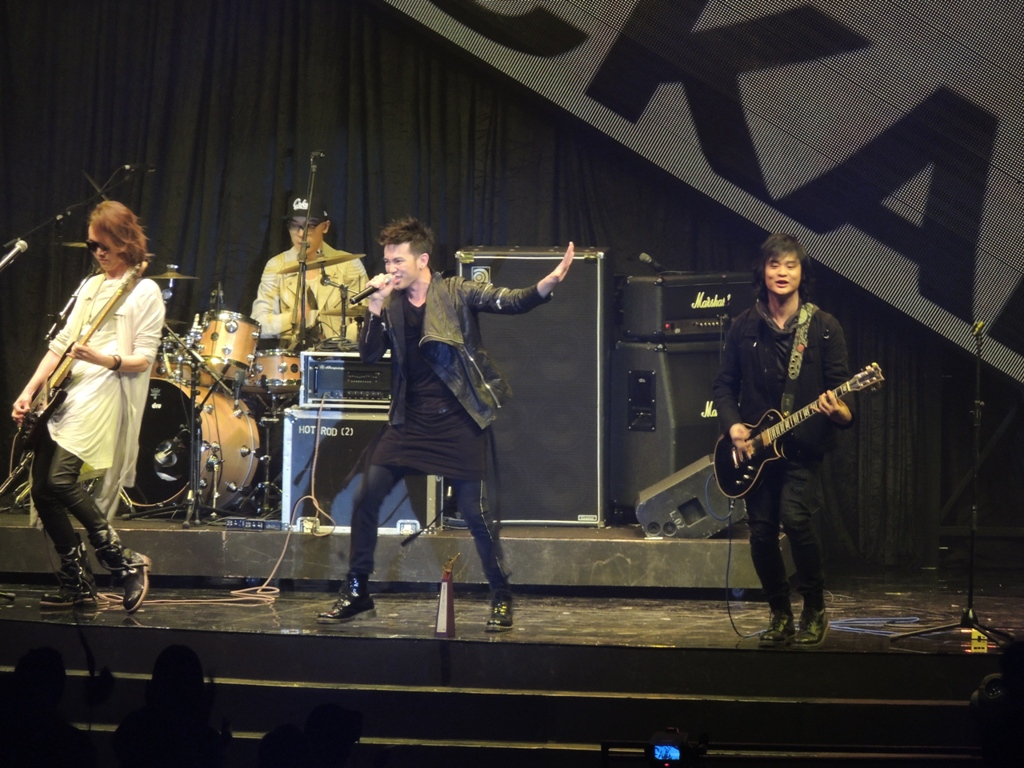

Background information
- Origin: Hong Kong
- Genre: Pop Rock
- Label: Warner Music
- Members: Tim Wong - Lead Vocal; Jackal Ng - Bassist; Howie Yung - Guitarist; Nice Lai - Drummer
- Past members: Adam Diaz - Guitarist
- Website: WarnerMusic.com.hk/Dear-Jane

Dear Jane is a Hong Kong boy band that consists of Tim Wong (lead vocalist), Jackal Ng (bass), Howie Yung (guitar/vocals) and Nice Lai (drums).

== History ==
Dear Jane was formed in 2003. Members Adam Diaz and Howie Yung had previously been in an indie band called "Fuse". The band's name refers to the term Dear John letter but from the point of view of a male writing to a female. The name signifies their music highlighting the point of view of a male.

Dear Jane was first signed by See Music Ltd. In 2008, the contract was discontinued and the band was later signed by Music Nation Ltd., the same record company as Aaron Kwok. In 2011, the band moved to Warner Music.

== Mainland China censorship ==
The Dear Jane song Galactic Repairman was released in 2020 to great popularity in Hong Kong. In July 2021, it was reported that a Hong Kong secondary school, the ELCHK Yuen Long Lutheran Secondary School, had punished students for singing the song during a school singing competition, claiming the lyrics contained political themes. The Education Bureau of the Hong Kong government reportedly warned the school that the song might violate the national security law imposed on Hong Kong by China in 2020.

It was subsequently revealed that Chinese streaming service QQ Music had censored the song in response to the incident. A month later, the Chinese Ministry of Culture and Tourism announced that it would establish a list of songs banned for "illegal content". Dear Jane's song was thereafter taken off the air in China.

In January 2022, there were unconfirmed allegations that DJs from RTHK, Hong Kong's public broadcaster, had been barred from playing any songs from 10 artists, including Dear Jane.

== Discography ==
- "100" (2006) - by See Music Ltd.
- "XOXO" (2009) - by Music Nation Ltd.
- "GAMMA" (2011)
- "Yellow Fever!" (2012)
- "Dear Jane (Special Edition)" (2014)
- "Unavoidable" (2013)
- 101 (2016)
- Limerence (2020)
