= List of entertainment events at AsiaWorld–Expo =

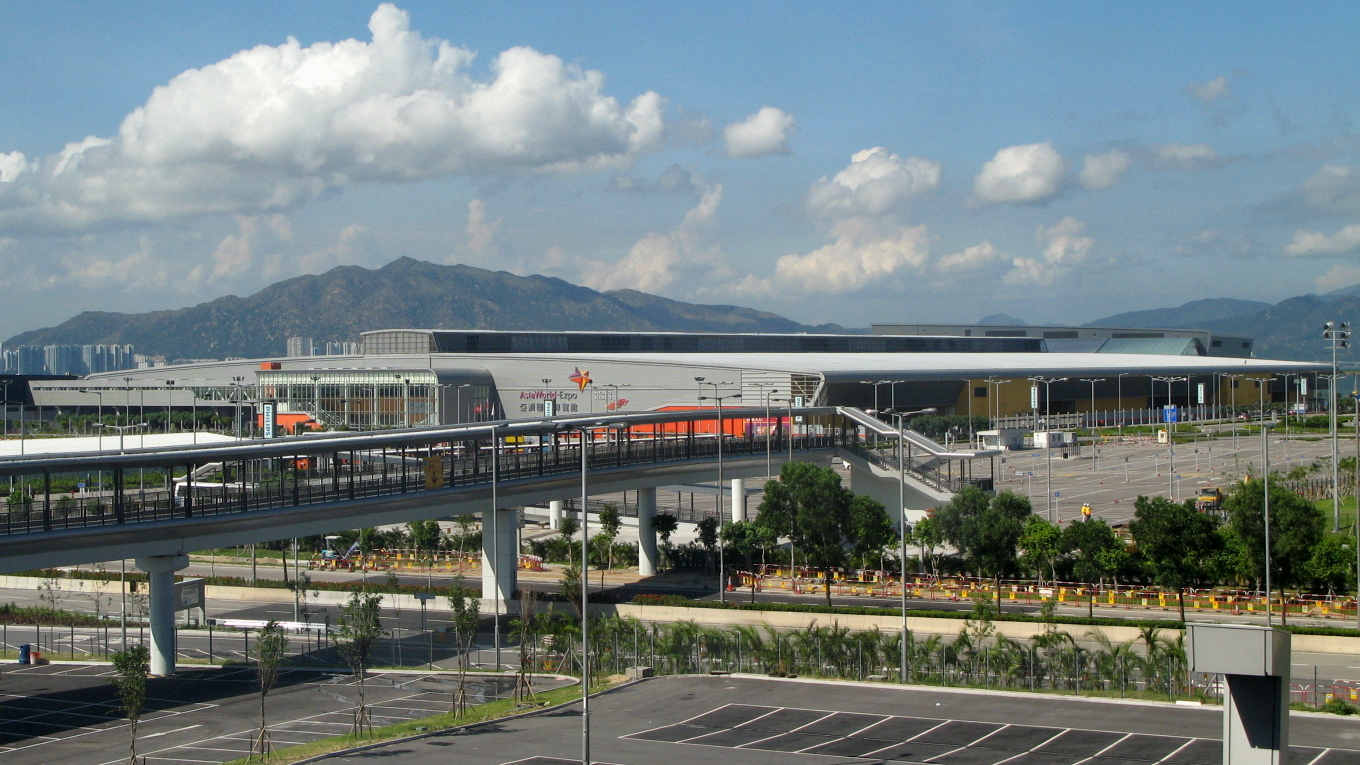
AsiaWorld–Expo in 2007

AsiaWorld–Expo, a major convention and exhibition facility in Hong Kong, has been one of the busiest venues in the city. The halls in the venue have been used for various entertainment events after its grand opening on 25 December 2005. It houses the AsiaWorld–Arena, the biggest purpose-built indoor seated entertainment arena in Hong Kong with a maximum capacity of 14,000. Viva (stylised in all uppercase), a combination of hall 8 and 10 of the AsiaWorld–Expo which is commonly and simply referred to as AsiaWorld–Expo Hall 10, is a smaller venue that has also been frequently used for concert events.

All events are categorised according to years and venues; in a chronological order.

== 2000s ==
=== 2006 ===
Entertainment events at AsiaWorld–Arena
Date	Artist	Event
25 February	Oasis	Don't Believe the Truth Tour
13 July	Coldplay	Twisted Logic Tour
16 July	The Black Eyed Peas	Monkey Business Tour
9 September	Westlife	Face to Face Tour

=== 2007 ===
Entertainment events at AsiaWorld–Arena
Date	Artist	Event
17 January	Eric Clapton	Live in HK 2007
22 January	Il Divo	Live in HK 2007
3 March	Muse	Black Holes and Revelations Tour
3 July	Christina Aguilera	Back to Basics Tour
30 July	The Cure	4 Play Tour
16 August	Gwen Stefani	The Sweet Escape Tour
18 August	Avril Lavigne	The Best Damn Thing Promotional Tour
13 September	Nine Inch Nails	Live in HK 2007
20 November	Linkin Park	—N/a
21 December	Gigi Leung	—N/a

=== 2008 ===
Entertainment events at AsiaWorld–Arena
Date	Artist	Event
29 January	My Chemical Romance	The Black Parade World Tour
20–22 February	Disney On Ice	Princess Wishes World Tour
28 February	Björk	Volta tour
29 February	Backstreet Boys	Unbreakable Tour
7 March	Santana	Live Your Light Tour
19 March	Maroon 5	It Won't Be Soon Before Long Tour
20 May	Elton John	Rocket Man: Greatest Hits Live
29 July	Alicia Keys	As I Am Tour
5 August	Simple Plan	Live N' Loud Tour
20–21 September	Ayumi Hamasaki	Ayumi Hamasaki Asia Tour 2008
27 November	Kylie Minogue	KylieX2008

=== 2009 ===
Entertainment events at AsiaWorld–Arena
Date	Artist	Event
25 March	Coldplay	Viva la Vida Tour
1 April	Sarah Brightman	The Symphony World Tour
7 April	Oasis	Dig Out Your Soul Tour
18 September	Super Junior	Super Show 2 Tour
12 December	SS501	Persona tour

== 2010s ==
=== 2010 ===
Entertainment events at AsiaWorld–Arena
Date	Artist	Event
16 January	Green Day	21st Century Breakdown World Tour
6 February	Muse	The Resistance Tour
10 May	Deep Purple	Rapture of the Deep tour
29 July	Slash	2010–2011 World Tour
3 December	Gorillaz	Escape to Plastic Beach Tour
11 December	Luna Sea	20th Anniversary World Tour Reboot

=== 2011 ===
Entertainment events at AsiaWorld–Arena
Date	Artist	Event
18 February	Eric Clapton	—N/a
21 February	Taylor Swift	Speak Now World Tour
4–6, 10–11 March	Faye Wong	Faye Wong Tour
7 May	Avril Lavigne	Black Star Tour
13 May	Justin Bieber	My World Tour
24 May	Maroon 5	Hands All Over Tour
26 June	Yui	YUI LIVE 2011 〜Hong Kong HOTEL HOLIDAYS IN THE SUN〜
7 August	James Blunt	Some Kind of Trouble Tour
6 September	Linkin Park	A Thousand Suns World Tour

Entertainment events at AsiaWorld–Expo Hall 10
Date	Artist	Event
14 August	Paramore	Brand New Eyes World Tour
27 September	Westlife	Gravity Tour

=== 2012 ===
Entertainment events at AsiaWorld–Arena
Date	Artist	Event
10 January	Simple Plan	Get Your Hearts On Tour
15 January	Girls' Generation	Girls' Generation Tour
21 February	Evanescence	Evanescence Tour
3 March	L'Arc~en~Ciel	2012 World Tour
14 March	Duran Duran	The All You Need Is Now Tour
2–3, 5–7 May	Lady Gaga	Born This Way Ball
18–30 May	Jacky Cheung	1/2 Century World Tour
23 June	—N/a	Music Bank World Tour
24 June	Jason Mraz	iTunes Live in Hong Kong 2012
24 July	The Stone Roses	—N/a
4 August	Snow Patrol	Fallen Empires Tour
27 September	Maroon 5	Overexposed Tour
27 October	Shinee	—N/a
4 November	Chicago	—N/a
13 November	LMFAO	Sorry for Party Rocking Tour
28 November	Jennifer Lopez	Dance Again World Tour
8–10 December	Big Bang	Alive Galaxy Tour

Entertainment events at AsiaWorld–Expo Hall 10
Date	Artist	Event
3 March	Westlife	Greatest Hits Tour

=== 2013 ===
Entertainment events at AsiaWorld–Arena
Date	Artist	Event
19 January	TVXQ	Catch Me: Live World Tour
16 March	Namie Amuro	Namie Amuro Asia Tour 2013
6 May	Blur	Live in Hong Kong 2013
10–11 May	CN Blue	Blue Moon World Tour
17–18 May	G-Dragon	One of a Kind World Tour
8 June	Shinhwa	Grand Tour in Hong Kong: The Classic
15–16 June	Super Junior	Super Show 5 Tour
10 August	T-ara	It's T-ara Time Live in Hong Kong 2013
11 August	Air Supply	Live in Hong Kong 2013
13 August	The Smashing Pumpkins	Live in Hong Kong 2013
15 August	Linkin Park	Living Things World Tour
18 August	Infinite	One Great Step
22–25 August	Cirque du Soleil	Michael Jackson: The Immortal World Tour
24 September	The Killers	Battle Born World Tour
9–10 November	Girls' Generation	Girls & Peace World Tour
22 November	—N/a	2013 Mnet Asian Music Awards

=== 2014 ===
Entertainment events at AsiaWorld–Arena
Date	Artist	Event
12 January	James Blunt	Moon Landing Tour
23 January	Sarah Brightman	Dreamchaser World Tour
13 February	Avril Lavigne	The Avril Lavigne Tour
22 March	2NE1	All or Nothing World Tour
29–30 March	Bruno Mars	The Moonshine Jungle Tour
1–2 June	Exo	Exo from Exoplanet 1 – The Lost Planet
8 November	Super Junior	Super Show 6
3 December	—N/a	Mnet Asian Music Awards

Entertainment events at AsiaWorld–Expo Hall 10
Date	Artist	Event
20 March	Macklemore & Ryan Lewis	Live in Hong Kong 2014
26 September	Pet Shop Boys	Electric Tour

=== 2015 ===
Entertainment events at AsiaWorld–Arena
Date	Artist	Event
31 January	Got7	Asia Tour Showcase 2015
14 February	2PM	Go CrazyTour
18 March	One Direction	On the Road Again Tour
27 March	Jason Mraz	An Acoustic Evening With Jason Mraz And Raining Jane
12–14 June	Big Bang	Made World Tour
16–17 August	Exo	Exo Planet #2 – The Exo'luxion
23 August	Imagine Dragons	Smoke and Mirrors Tour
28 August	Muse	Drones World Tour
4 September	Maroon 5	Maroon V Tour
2 December	—N/a	Mnet Asian Music Awards

Entertainment events at AsiaWorld–Expo Hall 10
Date	Artist	Event
15 January	Avenged Sevenfold	Hail to the King Tour
21 January	Michael Bublé	To Be Loved Tour
31 January	Lily Allen	Sheezus Tour
10 March	Ed Sheeran	x Tour

=== 2016 ===
Entertainment events at AsiaWorld–Arena
Date	Artist	Event
17–18 February	Madonna	Rebel Heart Tour
7 May	iKon	iKoncert 2016: Showtime Tour
22–24 July	Big Bang	Made V.I.P Tour
30 July	Got7	Fly Tour
28 September	Queen + Adam Lambert	2016 Summer Festival Tour
2 December	—N/a	Mnet Asian Music Awards

Entertainment events at AsiaWorld–Expo Hall 10
Date	Artist	Event
28 January	The Vamps	Wake Up World Tour
10 March	5 Seconds of Summer	Sounds Live Feels Live World Tour

=== 2017 ===
Entertainment events at AsiaWorld–Arena
Date	Artist	Event
20 January	Metallica	WorldWired Tour
11 February	Exo	Exo Planet #3 – The Exo'rdium
13–14 May	BTS	2017 BTS Live Trilogy Episode III: The Wings Tour
20 May	SHINee	Shinee World V
27 June	Britney Spears	Britney: Live in Concert
1 July	Got7	Global Fanmeeting Hong Kong 2017
25–26 August	G-Dragon	Act III: M.O.T.T.E World Tour
19 September	OneRepublic	16th Annual Honda Civic Tour
21 September	Ariana Grande	Dangerous Woman Tour
1 December	—N/a	Mnet Asian Music Awards

Entertainment events at AsiaWorld–Expo Hall 10
Date	Artist	Event
14 January	Bryan Adams	Get Up Tour
31 March	Fifth Harmony	The 7/27 Tour
10–11 June	Taeyeon	Taeyeon Solo Concert "Persona"
13 December	Shawn Mendes	Illuminate World Tour

=== 2018 ===
Entertainment events at AsiaWorld–Arena
Date	Artist	Event
13 January	Imagine Dragons	Evolve World Tour
10 February	Super Junior	Super Show 7
30 March	Katy Perry	Witness: The Tour
12–13 May	Bruno Mars	24K Magic World Tour
2–3 June	Exo	Exo Planet #4 – The Elyxion
28–29 July	Wanna One	One: The World
24 August	Got7	Eyes on You World Tour
31 August	Seventeen	Seventeen Concert 'Ideal Cut'
19 September	The Killers	Wonderful Wonderful World Tour
17 November	Taeyeon	's... Taeyeon Concert
20–21 November	Guns N' Roses	Not in This Lifetime... Tour
25 November	IKon	IKon 2018 Continue Tour
24 November	Winner	Winner Everywhere Tour
30 November	The Weeknd	The Weeknd Asia Tour
14 December	—N/a	Mnet Asian Music Awards

Entertainment events at AsiaWorld–Expo Hall 10
Date	Artist	Event
10 March	John Legend	Darkness and the Light Tour
24 March	Glay	Arena Tour 2018 Springdelics
29 March	James Blunt	The Afterlove World Tour
31 March	Zedd	Echo Tour
22 September	Jessie J	The R.O.S.E. Tour
4 November	Charlie Puth	Voicenotes Tour

=== 2019 ===
Entertainment events at AsiaWorld–Arena
Date	Artist	Event
26 January	Blackpink	In Your Area World Tour
20–21, 23–24 March	BTS	BTS World Tour: Love Yourself
19 May	Joker Xue	Skyscraper World Tour
28 September	Mamamoo	2019 Mamamoo Concert 4Seasons F/W
18–31 December	—N/a	The Lion King

Entertainment events at AsiaWorld–Expo Hall 10
Date	Artist	Event
12 January	Seungri	The Great Seungri
28 March	Pet Shop Boys	Super Tour
6 May	Troye Sivan	The Bloom Tour
13 July	Iz One	Eyes On Me
3 August	GFriend	GFriend 2nd Asia Tour

== 2020s ==
=== 2020 ===
Entertainment events at AsiaWorld–Arena
Date	Artist	Event
1–12 January	—N/a	The Lion King

=== 2021 ===
Entertainment events at AsiaWorld–Arena
Date	Artist	Event
27 September	Terence Lam, Keung To, Jer Lau & Tyson Yoshi	Music is Live 2021

=== 2022 ===
Entertainment events at AsiaWorld–Arena
Date	Artist	Event
1 January	—N/a	Ultimate Song Chart Awards Presentation 2021
13 August	Kay Tse & Charmaine Fong	Kay Tse x Charmaine Fong
9 September	—N/a	903 Music Green Sonic Brand New Live
1–2 October	—N/a	Tone Music Festival 2022
13 November	Joyce Cheng & Anson Lo	Music is Live
19–20 November	Super Junior	Super Show 9: Road
27 November	—N/a	The 4th KKBox Hong Kong Music Awards
3 December	RubberBand & Charmaine Fong	Moov Live RubberBand x Charmaine Fong
17–18 December	Miriam Yeung	B minor MUSIC LIVE 2022
26 December	George Lam	The Smiling Concert

Entertainment events at AsiaWorld–Summit (Hall 2)
Date	Artist	Event
12–14 August	—N/a	Awaken Festival
29–30 October	—N/a	Un1ted Fest 2022

=== 2023 ===
Entertainment events at AsiaWorld–Arena
Date	Artist	Event
1 January	—N/a	Ultimate Song Chart Awards Presentation 2022
6 January	Alan Walker	Walkerverse The Tour
13–14 January	Blackpink	Born Pink World Tour
4 February	Jason Chan	Concert 2023
14–15 February	Westlife	The Wild Dreams Tour
21 February	OneRepublic	Live in Concert
11 March	DaBaby, Tyson Yoshi, Nick Chou & MC Cheung	Punch Live 2023
14–15 March	Backstreet Boys	DNA World Tour
24–25 March	NCT Dream	The Dream Show 2: In A Dream
14 May	Ian Chan, Anson Kong & Panther Chan	Music is Live
20 May	Treasure	Treasure Tour Hello
10 June	Taeyeon	The Odd of Love
8 July	Juno Mak & Endy Chow	Concert 2023
15 July	Alan Walker	Alan Walker Encore Hong Kong
23–26 July	Anson Lo	"The Stage" In My Sight Solo Concert 2023
2–5 August	Keung To	"Waves" In My Sight Solo Concert 2023
19 August	Dear Jane & MC Cheung	Music is Live
25–27 August	Edan Lui	"In My Sight of E" Solo Concert
25 September	Post Malone	If Y'all Weren't Here, I'd Be Crying Tour
30 September	—N/a	Tone Music Festival 2023
1 October	—N/a	Tone Music Festival 2023
4 October	Charlie Puth	Charlie the Live Experience
6 October	Sam Smith	Gloria The Tour
18 November	Hins Cheung & Terence Lam	Music is Live Hins Cheung x Terence Lam The Perfect Match
2-3 December	Joker Xue	Extraterrestrial World Tour
7–8 December	One Ok Rock	Luxury Disease Asia Tour 2023
15–17 December	Jan Lamb	Uncle Auntie Farewell Party Concert 2023

Entertainment events at AsiaWorld–Expo Hall 10
Date	Artist	Event
7 May	—N/a	Chill Club Chart Award Presentation 22/23
31 May	Babymetal	World Tour 2023
22-23 July	I-dle	I Am Free-ty World Tour 2023
22–23 August	Lauv	The Between Albums Tour
30 September	Le Sserafim	Le Sserafim Tour "Flame Rises"
1 October	Le Sserafim	Le Sserafim Tour "Flame Rises"

=== 2024 ===
Entertainment events at AsiaWorld–Arena
Date	Artist	Event
1 January	—N/a	Ultimate Song Chart Awards Presentation 2023
15–17, 19–22, 24–27, 29–31 January, 2–3 February	Mirror	MIRROR Feel The Passion Concert Tour 2024
30–31 March	—N/a	KCON Hong Kong 2024
12 May	—N/a	CHILL CLUB Chart Award Presentation 23/24
25–26 May	IU	HEREH World Tour
6–7 July	Ive	Show What I Have World Tour
19–25 July	Ian Chan	"TEARS" In My Sight Solo Concert 2024
29–30 July	Anson Kong	"THE GAME OF LIFE" In My Sight Solo Concert 2024
17–18 August	Hikaru Utada	Science Fiction Tour 2024
23-25 August	I-dle	I-dol World Tour
6–7 September	Super Junior	SUPER SHOW SPIN-OFF: Halftime
24 September	Olivia Rodrigo	Guts World Tour
19 November	Lisa	Lisa Fan Meetup in Asia 2024
30 November – 1 December	Imagine Dragons	Loom World Tour
26–27 December	Yoasobi	Chō-genjitsu Asia Tour

Entertainment events at AsiaWorld–Expo Hall 10
Date	Artist	Event
17 February	Super Junior-L.S.S.	THE SHOW: Th3ee Guys Tour
29 August	Laufey	Bewitched: The Goddess Tour

=== 2025 ===
Entertainment events at AsiaWorld–Arena
Date	Artist	Event
18–19 January	Stray Kids	Dominate World Tour
28–29 March	Jisoo	Lights, Love, Action! Asia Tour
14 May	Hans Zimmer	RCI Global and Semmel Concerts present: HANS ZIMMER LIVE
18 May	Ado	Hibana World Tour
24–25 May	Babymonster	Hello Monsters World Tour
7 June	Taeyeon	Taeyeon Concert - 'The TENSE'
19 July	Riize	Riizing Loud
25 July	Le Sserafim	Easy Crazy Hot Tour
9–10 August	G-Dragon	Übermensch World Tour
5–6 September	Super Junior	Super Show 10
27–28 September	Baekhyun	Reverie World Tour
8 November	Hatsune Miku	Miku Expo 2025 Asia
14–16 November	—N/a	BLAST Premier Rivals 2025 Season 2

Entertainment events at AsiaWorld–Expo Hall 5
Date	Artist	Event
24 February	Aurora	What Happened to the Earth?
22 November	WayV	No Way Out Concert

Entertainment events at AsiaWorld–Expo Hall 11
Date	Artist	Event
14 March	GFriend	GFRIEND 10th Anniversary ＜Season of Memories＞
9 September	Travis Japan	VIIsual World Tour

Entertainment events at AsiaWorld–Expo Hall 10
Date	Artist	Event
1 April	Russell Peters	Relax World Tour
6 April	BoyNextDoor	Knock On Vol.1 Tour
2–3 May	NCT Wish	NCT Wish Asia Tour Log In
9 July	Jay Park	Serenades & Body Rolls World Tour
9 August	STAYC	Stay Tuned Tour
16 August	Kai	KaiOn Asia Tour
29 August	Park Bo-gum	Fan Meeting Tour 'Be With You'
30 September	Sekai no Owari	Phoenix Asia Tour 2025

Entertainment events at AsiaWorld–Expo Hall 2
Date	Artist	Event
26 April	Nmixx	NMIXX 2nd Fan Concert "NMIXX Change Up: MIXX Lab"

Entertainment events at AsiaWorld–Expo Hall 3
Date	Artist	Event
22 February	Yesung	It's Complicated Concert Tour

=== 2026 ===
Entertainment events at AsiaWorld–Arena
Date	Artist	Event
9–11 January	Tomorrow X Together	Act: Tomorrow
7–8 February	Aespa	Synk: Aexis Line
9 May	Treasure	Pulse On Tour
30 May	KAF	KAF WORLD CIRCUIT 2026
18 July	LiSA	LiVE is Smile Always ~ 15~
13–15 November	—N/a	BLAST Premier Rivals 2026 Season 2
