= List of Hong Kong films of 2022 =

This article lists feature-length Hong Kong films released in 2022 after 20 April.

== Box office ==
The highest-grossing Hong Kong films released in 2022, by domestic box office gross revenue, are as follows:

(List of 2022 box office number-one films in Hong Kong)

Highest-grossing films released in 2022
Rank	Title	Distributor	Domestic gross
1	Warriors of Future	One Cool Film	HK$81,907,591
2	Table for Six	Edko Films	HK$77,284,947
3	The Sparring Partner	Mei Ah Entertainment	HK$41,042,504
4	Mama's Affair	Emperor Films	HK$41,004,822
5	Chilli Laugh Story	Continental Film Distribution	HK$32,708,642
6	Detective vs Sleuths	Emperor Cinema	HK$16,223,882
7	Hong Kong Family	Edko Films	HK$11,561,776
8	Far Far Away	Golden Scene Company Limited	HK$10,692,197
9	The Narrow Road	Golden Scene Company Limited	HK$5,146,871
10	Sunshine Of My Life	Mandarin Motion Pictures	HK$4,590,309

== Releases ==
All cinemas were ordered to close by the Hong Kong government due to social distancing measures of the COVID-19 pandemic from 7 January until 20 April 2022.

Opening		Title	Director	Cast	Genre	Ref.
A P R	28	Breakout Brothers 2	Mak Ho-pong	Patrick Tam, Louis Cheung, Ron Ng, Justin Cheung, Adam Pak and Kenny Wong	Action comedy	
M A Y	5	Ghost Wedding	Leung Hung-Wah	Carlos Chan, Rose Chan, Ava Yu	Horror	
J U N	2	Breakout Brothers 3	Mak Ho-pong	Patrick Tam, Ron Ng, Kenny Wong, Justin Cheung, Adam Pak	Action comedy	
J U N	16	A Murder Erased	Dennis Law	Cheung Siu-fai, Simon Yam, Maggie Shiu, Dada Chan, Timmy Hung	Suspense, Crime	
J U N	30	Burning	Benny Lau	Kevin Cheng, Dada Chan, Rebecca Zhu	Thriller, Romance	
J U L	14	Chilli Laugh Story	Coba Cheng	Edan Lui, Sandra Ng, Gigi Leung, Ronald Cheng and Angela Yuen	Comedy	MIRROR's Edan Lui first film.
J U L	21	Detective vs Sleuths	Wai Ka-fai	Sean Lau, Charlene Choi and Raymond Lam	Action thriller	
J U L	23	Just 1 Day	Erica Li	Charlene Choi and Wong Cho-lam	Romance	
J U L	28	Septet: The Story of Hong Kong	Johnnie To, Ann Hui, Tsui Hark, Ringo Lam, Patrick Tam, Sammo Hung, Yuen Woo-ping	Timmy Hung, Francis Ng, Sire Ma, Jennifer Yu, Ian Gouw, Yuen Wah, Simon Yam	Drama	
J U L	28	Pretty Heart	Terry Ng Ka-Wai	Vincent Wong, Jennifer Yu, Hugo Ng Toi Yung	Drama	
A U G	4	Far Far Away	Huang Haoran	Kaki Sham, Cecilia So, Crystal Cheung, Hanna Chan, Jennifer Yu, Rachel Leung	Romance	
A U G	11	Mama's Affair	Kearen Pang	Teresa Mo, Keung To, Jer Lau	Drama	MIRROR's Keung To and Jer Lau first film.
A U G	25	Warriors of Future	Ng Yuen-fai	Louis Koo, Sean Lau, Carina Lau, Nick Cheung	Science Fiction, Action	
S E P	8	Table for Six	Sunny Chan	Dayo Wong, Stephy Tang, Louis Cheung, Ivana Wong, Peter Chan, Lin Min Chen	Comedy	
S E P	15	Sunshine of My Life	Fung-Han Chu	Kara Wai, Karena Ng, Janis Chan	Drama	
S E P	15	Tales From The Occult	Fruit Chan, Chi-Keung Fung, Wesley Hoi Ip Sang	Peter Chan, Lawrence Cheng, Richie Jen, Cherry Ngan, Sofiee Ng, Cecilia So, Kelvin Kwan	Horror	
O C T	6	Life Must Go On	Ying Chi Wen	Ekin Cheng, Catherine Chau, Gladys Li, Cloud Wan, Feanna Wong, Isabella Chang, Chung Suet Ying	Sports comedy	Dodgeball film
O C T	28	The Sparring Partner	Ho Cheuk-tin	Yeung Wai-lun, Mak Pui-tung, Louisa So, Michael Chow, Jan Lamb, Gloria Yip	Legal thriller	Adapted from Murder of Glory Chau and Moon Siu case Mak Pui-tung won Best Newcomer at the 16th Asian Film Awards
O C T	28	Let it Ghost	Wong Hoi	Chloe So, MC $oHo & KidNey, Ashina Kwok, Locker Lam, Ling Man-lung, Kaki Sham, Angel Lam, Eric Tsui	Horror	
N O V	2	Love is Blind, Hate Too	Patrick Kong	Kathy Yuen, Ron Ng	Drama, Thriller	
N O V	17	Love Suddenly	Mak Ho Bon	Anson Kong, Karena Ng, Chloe So, Adam Pak, Roxanne Tong, Shirley Chan, Edward Ma, Michael Ning	Comedy, Romance	MIRROR's Anson Kong first film.
N O V	24	Hong Kong Family	Hing Weng Eric Tsang	Teresa Mo, Edan Lui, Tse Kwan-ho, Hedwig Tam, Angela Yuen, Anson Lo, Alice Fung So-bor	Drama	World premiere at Busan International Film Festival.
D E C	22	The Narrow Road	Lam Sum	Louis Cheung, Angela Yuen	Drama	

== See also ==
- 2022 in Hong Kong
- List of 2022 box office number-one films in Hong Kong
- List of Hong Kong films of 2021
- List of Hong Kong films of 2023
- 41st Hong Kong Film Awards
