= Ian Chan =

Hong Kong singer-songwriter and actor

- 陳卓賢
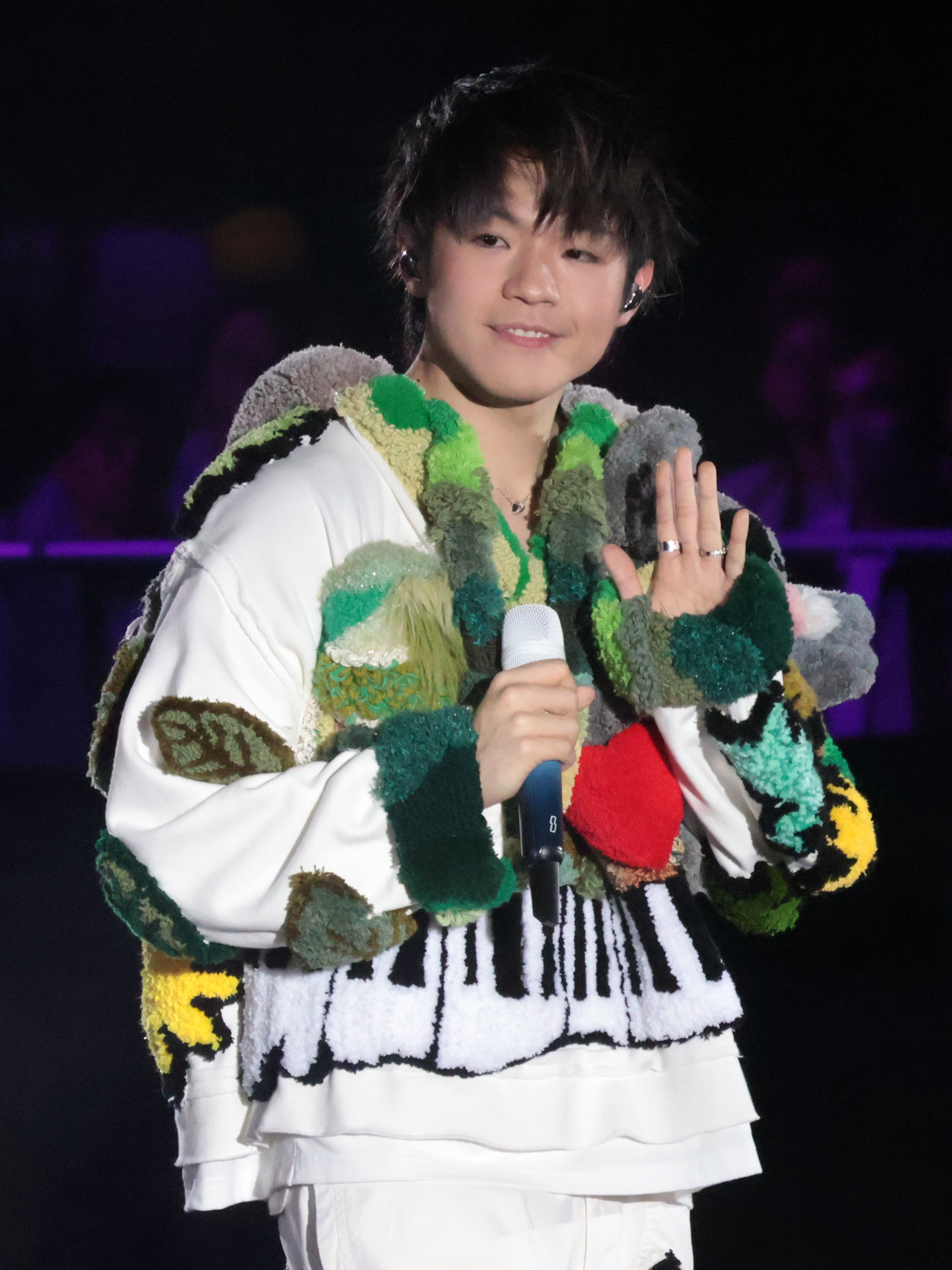
- Chan performing in 2024
- Born: 9 June 1993 (age 33); British Hong Kong
- Education: City University of Hong Kong (BSocSc)
- Occupations: Singer; songwriter; actor
- Years active: 2018–present
- Agent: HKTVE
- Musical career
- Genres: Cantopop; R&B
- Instruments: Vocals; keyboards; guitar; saxophone
- Years active: 2018–present
- Label: Music Nation
- Member of: Mirror
- Sports career
- Years active: 2013–2018
- Height: 1.81 m (5 ft 11 1/2 in)
- Country: Hong Kong
- Sport: Volleyball
- Position: Setter
- University team: City University of Hong Kong
- Club: South China Athletic Association

Chinese name
- Traditional Chinese: 陳卓賢
- Simplified Chinese: 陈卓贤
Transcriptions
Standard Mandarin
- Hanyu Pinyin: Chén Zhuóxián
- Bopomofo: ㄔㄣˊㄓㄨㄛˊㄒㄧㄢˊ
Yue: Cantonese
- Jyutping: can^{4} coek^{3} jin^{4}
- IPA: [tsʰɐn˩ tsʰœk̚˧ jin˩]

Ian Chan Cheuk-yin (Chinese: 陳卓賢; Jyutping: can4 coek3 jin4; born 9 June 1993), is a Hong Kong singer-songwriter, actor, and a member of the Cantopop group Mirror. He was a former volleyball player for the Hong Kong men's national volleyball team and South China Athletic Association. He is also the founder of the clothing brand Indipandant (stylised as iNDIPANDANT and idpt.).

== Early life and education ==
Chan was born on 9 June 1993 in Hong Kong. He is the youngest son and has two older brothers and one older sister. He was originally given the baptismal name Thomas, but he later chose the name Ian based on the main character of a story.

Chan graduated from St Francis of Assisi's Caritas School and Cheung Sha Wan Catholic Secondary School.

In high school, Chan's first-year homeroom teacher happened to be the coach of the volleyball team and asked him to try out. Although he did not make the cut the first year, Chan kept practicing and was successfully selected the following year. He was named "best setter" at the 2011-2012 All Hong Kong Schools Jing Ying Volleyball Tournament. Chan also took part in basketball, table tennis and track and field. He also got a black belt in taekwondo.

He went on to study a Bachelor of Social Sciences in Public Policy and Politics at the City University of Hong Kong and represented his university as part of the national volleyball team through the South China Athletic Association.

Chan also developed an interest in music, learning how to play the piano and guitar on his own in his free time. In his freshman year at CityU, he participated in the CityU Student Union's 8th Joint Society Singing Contest, winning first place and getting free vocal lessons for a year. He later went on to sign with ST Entertainment, introduced to him by his vocal coach.

== Career ==
=== 2018: Debut on King Maker, Mirror ===
In 2018, Chan's entertainment company suggested that he participate in the ViuTV Good Night Show - King Maker competition. With his university graduation approaching and knowing it would be difficult to have a career as an athlete in Hong Kong, Chan retired from the national volleyball team in order to focus on his career as a performer and to participate in the show.

Throughout the show, Chan exhibited his musical talents, singing in Cantonese, English and Mandarin, as well as performing with a guitar and a piano. Chan finished in second place with a score of 16.3%.

On 3 November 2018, Chan debuted as a member of Mirror alongside 11 of the other participants from the show under the management of Ahfa Wong.

During a Mirror 100問 video, when a staff member asked what each of the group members called their personal fans, Chan responded "Hello", mistaking the question as one asking how he would greet his fans. As a result, his fans became known as Hellosss, although Chan later remarked that he did not know when that name had become official.

=== 2019–2020: Solo activities, We Are the Littles ===
On 9 June 2019, Chan debuted as a solo artist with his first single "二期大樓" (Phase II Building) and held his first solo mini concert called "Ian Chan Better Me Mini Concert". His fellow group members came out to support him in celebration of his 26th birthday.

On 2 September 2019, Chan released his second solo single "另一個諾貝爾" (Another Nobel), coinciding with the release of Keung To's "亞特蘭提斯" (Atlantis). The two also worked together for their music film Love Before Birthday, released on 6 September.

Chan was asked if there was competitive pressure releasing music at the same time as Keung, since the two were often compared, being the top two finalists of Good Night Show — King Maker. Chan responded that he and Keung instead believed that promoting together was mutually beneficial, hoping that it could get more fans to discover and listen to both their songs. In addition, he felt their styles were different and did not necessarily compete.

Chan participated in the songwriting for "另一個諾貝爾" (Another Nobel), working with Cousin Fung and Lam Bo. Chan suggested that when one hears the word "nobel" (Chinese: 諾貝爾; Jyutping: nok6 bui3 ji5), one might first think about the Nobel Prize rather than Chernobyl, in Chinese: (Chinese: 諾貝爾獎; Jyutping: nok6 bui3 ji5 zoeng2) and (Chinese: 切爾諾貝爾; Jyutping: cit3 ji5 nok6 bui3 ji5), respectively. This bias is analogous to when a person only looks at the positive side of things without also considering the negative. Conversely, when a person loses someone or something precious, they may come to realise and to appreciate its value only after it has been lost. Chan expressed that these two possible readings can be applied to the song's central theme about relationships. He also noted that it was difficult getting the feel for the song when he first started recording, but later got a better grasp of the intended emotion after watching Battle Angel.

In December 2019, Chan and fellow group members began filming for We Are the Littles, portraying volleyball players who work together to overcome adversity and become the best team. Chan stated it was like destiny that the first drama he got to act in was one similar to his past life as a volleyball player. His past volleyball experience also allowed him to be a body double for his fellow cast members. We Are the Littles began airing on ViuTV in November 2020.

On 14 February 2020, Chan released "正式開始" (Officially Begin) as a Valentine's Day present for fans. In the music video, Chan brings the fans on a trip in Japan, as if filmed from first-person perspective. Chan noted that the hand in the music video was not his manager Wong but another crew member.

On 29 July 2020, Chan released "鯨落" (Whale Fall), his first song where he is credited for both the music and the lyrics. Chan drew inspiration from an article he read about whale fall, a phenomenon where when a whale dies far away from land, many organisms come along and feed off its body for years as it slowly sinks into the depths of the ocean. Chan expressed that although it is unfortunate that a whale dies in such a way, it is extraordinary it can still support other organisms in its habitat after death. Chan creates the imagery of using water as a coffin and converting one's body into dessert as an analogy for one's willingness to self-sacrifice if it means it will help others succeed. Coincidentally, Chan wrote the song by the ocean while he was filming We Are the Littles.

Chan participated in writing the music for "蝸牛" (Snail), performed by his group member Anson Kong. In September 2020, the duo released their duet version with an accompanying music video.

On 18 November 2020, Chan released his second self-written song "背伴" (Betrayal). Chan combines the word 'betrayal' (Chinese: 背叛; Jyutping: bui3 bun6) with the homophonous first character of 'companion' (Chinese: 伴侶; Jyutping: bun6 leoi5) to portray a love story where one's companion secretly betrays them behind their back (Chinese: 背; Jyutping: bui3).

=== 2021–2023: Generation Slash and Sparks ===
On 29 March 2021, Chan shifted away from his usual dark and serious music style with the release of his upbeat love song "DWBF".

In April 2021, Chan starred in Generation Slash on ViuTV with co-stars Amy Lo and Himmy Wong. The drama centres around three young adults struggling to figure out what they want in life in the face of uncertainty. Chan's character embodies the "generation slash", having the desire for flexibility and freedom, taking up many different jobs, such as becoming an actor / artist / cook / delivery courier. The trio start up a small detective business to solve miscellaneous problems (as Chan's character says, they will do pretty much anything, as long as it does not break the law). The drama touches upon topics such as abandonment, grief, honesty, integrity, self-determination and choosing one's chosen family. It was during the drama production when Chan started dating his co-star Amy Lo, but the couple has since broken up as of November 2022.

On 18 April 2021, Chan attended the 2020-2021 Chill Club Awards and was awarded the bronze award for Male Artist of the Year. In addition, his duet with Anson Kong, another member of Mirror, "蝸牛" (Snail), was chosen as the 6th Top Song of the Year.

In June 2021, Chan appeared in Be a Better Mirror, where the members of Mirror attended a teamwork-building camp to learn more about themselves and each other. Chan's manager Wong expressed her desire for Chan to open up more. Chan expressed that he is quite introverted and felt that he did open up more and became more talkative since becoming a performer. At the same time, he felt he has also become more guarded about his inner thoughts.

On 14 February 2022, Chan released his solo "留一天與你喘息" (A Day To Breathe With You). This song marked his second release on the Valentine's Day following the solo "正式開始". The music video of the song in YouTube reached 1 million views 29 hours after its release and reached 10 million views within 2 months of its release. The song was later awarded the 7th place of the Top 10 Songs of the Year category in the Ultimate Song Chart Awards Presentation 2022. Chan released 3 more songs in 2022, named "Got U", "Distance" and "地球上的最後一朵花" (The Last Flower on Earth) respectively.

In 2023, Chan released 5 solo songs and a theme song for Sparks, including his first dance song "夜視鏡" (Night Version). Chan collaborated with Anson Poon and Anson Kong this year, composing "天黑時想跟你到白頭" and "Blue Monkey". This was the second collaboration between Ian Chan and Anson Kong after their collaboration of "蝸牛".

=== 2024–present: Interlude and "Tears" in My Sight Solo Concert Tour ===
In 2024, Chan released a series of songs that are related together, with him as the main character in the form of a teddy bear and Natalie Hsu as the heroine. The first chapter of the series of songs is called "Lost at First Sight", which was released again on Valentine's Day for the 3rd time. The second chapter "Thank You Postman" was released on 24 April. The third chapter "Solitude" was released on 2 July. The fourth and fifth chapters "Sculp" and "Interlude" were released on 4 September and 20 November, respectively. Chan later announced that all 5 chapters would be included in his first EP, Interlude. The album was released on 20 December.

Chan held his first solo concert Ian Chan "Tears" in My Sight Solo Concert 2024 in July in AsiaWorld–Arena for a total of 7 shows.

On 20 December 2024, the film Last Song for You was officially released with Chan playing as young So Sing-Wah, the adult version was played by Ekin Cheng.

== Discography ==
=== Studio albums ===
Title	Details
Halo	Released: 23 November 2026; Label: Music Nation Records; Formats: CD, digital download, streaming; Tracklist: 1. "無名指"; 2. "在遠方的你"; 3. "那抹柔光, 名為你"; 4. "It's Ū"; 5. "Growth!"; 6. "遲眠劑"; 7. "花邊細胞"; 8. "四"; 9. "無垢"

=== Extended plays ===
Title	Details
Interlude	Released: 20 December 2024; Label: Music Nation Records; Formats: CD, digital download, streaming; Tracklist: 1. "Lost at First Sight"; 2. "Thank You Postman"; 3. "以孤獨命名" (Solitude); 4. "鑿" (Sculp); 5. "玩偶奇遇記" (Interlude); 6. "Thank You Postman (In Autumn)"

=== Singles ===
==== As lead artist ====
Year	English title	Original title	Peak HK chart position	Album
2019	"Phase II Building"	二期大樓	-	Non-album single
2019	"Another Nobel"	另一個諾貝爾	-	Non-album single
2020	"Officially Begin"	正式開始	-	One and All
2020	"Whale Fall"	鯨落	-	One and All
2020	"Green Onion"	青蒽	-	Non-album single
2020	"Betrayal"	背伴	-	One and All
2021	"DWBF"	DWBF	-	Non-album single
2021	"Don't Understand"	搞不懂	-	Non-album single
2022	"A Day To Breathe With You"	留一天與你喘息	2	Non-album single
2022	"Got U"	Got U	10	Non-album single
2022	"Distance"	Distance	2	Non-album single
2022	"The Last Flower on Earth"	地球上的最後一朵花	4	Non-album single
2023	"Farewell, Sea of Tranquillity"	再見 寧靜海	4	Non-album single
2023	"Koala Cuddle"	抱抱無尾熊	11	Non-album single
2023	"Song After the Hug"	擁抱後的歌	17	Non-album single
2023	"Still Here"	仍在	5	Non-album single
2023	"Live Like Fire and Ice"	生若冰火	-	Sparks OST
2023	"Night Vision"	夜視鏡	19	Non-album single
2024	"Lost At First Sight"	Lost At First Sight	19	Interlude - EP
2024	"Thank You Postman"	Thank You Postman	13	Interlude - EP
2024	"Solitude"	以孤獨命名	1	Interlude - EP
2024	"Sculp"	鑿	15	Interlude - EP
2024	"Interlude"	玩偶奇遇記	9	Interlude - EP
2025	"NPC Adventure"	NPC的一場意外	-	Non-album single
2025	"Pessimism"	悲觀主義	-	Non-album single
2025	"The Weeping Tree"	樹會流眼淚	-	Non-album single
2025	"Written in the Stars"	給千億顆星選中的二人	-	Non-album single
2026	"Don't Rub Chilli Sauce into the Wound"	傷口上灑辣椒醬	-	Non-album single
2026	"Ring Finger"	無名指	-	Halo
2026	"Gossip"	花邊細胞	-	Halo
2026	"The Light"	那抹柔光，名為你	-	Halo
2026	"Growth!"	Growth!	-	Halo
2026	"Satellite"	無垢	-	Halo
2026	"Insomax"	遲眠劑	-	Halo
2026	"It's Ū"	It's Ū	-	Halo
2026	"Four"	四	-	Halo
2026	"You in the Distance"	在遠方的你	-	Halo

==== Collaborations ====
Year	English title	Original title
2020	"Snail (Duet Version)" (with Anson Kong)	蝸牛 (合唱版)
2023	"When It Gets Dark, I Want To Grow Old With You" (with Anson Poon)	天黑時想跟你到白頭
2024	"Culture Vulture" (with Jer Lau, Stanley Yau and Tiger Yau)	吃腐肉的鷹
2025	"OOTD" (with Marf Yau)	OOTD

== Filmography ==
=== Television series ===
Year	Title	Original Title	Role	Notes	Ref.
2020	We Are the Littles	男排女將	Yu Zai	Main role	
2021	Generation Slash	無限斜棟有限公司	Cheung Nok Hang	Main role	
2022	We Got Game	季前賽	Cheuk Lap Fung	Main role	
2023	Sparks	冰上火花	Lam Chin Fan	Main role	

=== Variety show ===
Year	Title	Original Title	Notes
2018	Good Night Show – King Maker	Good Night Show 全民造星	Contestant No. 32
2018	Mirror Go	—N/a	
2019	Mirror Go 2	—N/a	
2019	King Maker II	全民造星II	
2020	Chill Club	—N/a	Ep 34, 39 (with Mirror), 43
2021	Battle Feel	考有Feel	Ep 1, 2, 9, 10, 15, 16, 19, 20
2021	Be a Better Mirror	調教你MIRROR	
2023	Shiny Summer - Mirror+	全星暑假 - MIRROR+	Ep 1, 2, 4, 5
2023–2024	Mirror Time	—N/a	
2024	Mirror Chef	—N/a	

=== Film ===
Year	Title	Original Title	Role	Notes	Ref.
2019	Red Shoes and the Seven Dwarfs	魔鏡肥緣	Merlin	Voice only, Cantonese version	
2019	Love Before Birthday	戀愛要在生日前	Ian	45-minute music film	
2024	WE 12	12怪盜	Ian		
2024	Last Song for You	久別重逢	So Sing-wah (young)		

== Concerts ==
=== Solo ===
Year	Date	Name	Venue	Ref.
2019	9 June	Ian Chan Better Me Mini Concert	Music Zone, KITEC	
2024	19–25 July	Ian Chan "Tears" in My Sight Solo Concert 2024	AsiaWorld–Arena	
2025	12 March	Ian Chan "Tears" in My Sight Solo Concert Tour 2025	OVO Arena Wembley, London	
2025	6 June	Ian Chan "Tears" in My Sight Solo Concert Tour 2025	Melbourne Convention and Exhibition Centre	
2025	8 June	Ian Chan "Tears" in My Sight Solo Concert Tour 2025	The Star Event Centre, Sydney	
2025	18–19 July	Ian Chan "Tears" in My Sight Solo Concert Tour 2025	Galaxy Arena, Macau	
2026	23–26 July, 28 July – 1 August	Ian Chan: Growth: Live 2026	Kai Tak Arena	

=== Collaborations ===
Year	Date	Name	Venue	Collaborating artist(s)
2021	24–25 August	This is Live Concert 002	Star Hall, KITEC	Jay Fung
2021	7–8 December	MOOV Live Music on the Road	Hall 5BC, HKCEC	Anson Kong, Anson Lo, Edan Lui, Jer Lau, Keung To
2023	14 May	903 Music is Live Concert	AsiaWorld–Arena	Anson Kong, Panther Chan

=== Guest appearances ===
Year	Date	Name	Venue
2018	30 October	《We Are with You Concert 2018》	MacPherson Stadium
2022	29 May	Hins Cheung 《The Next 20 Hins Live in Hong Kong》	Hong Kong Coliseum
2024	11 October	Jay Fung 《The Soundtrack of My Life》	Hong Kong Coliseum

== Achievements and nominations ==
Year	Award	Category	Nominated work	Result	Ref.
2018	JOOX x Good Night Show - King Maker	The Best Male Singer		1st Round - Bronze	
2018	JOOX x Good Night Show - King Maker	The Best Male Singer		2nd Round - Champion	
2018	Good Night Show - King Maker			Silver	
2019	Metro Radio Music Awards	Metro Hit Popular New Performer		Won	
2019	Hong Kong Singer Channel - Song of the Year	The Most Admired New Male Performer		Silver	
2019	Hong Kong Singer Channel - Song of the Year	Top 10 Popular Songs	"Another Nobel"	Silver	
2019	Music Onair Awards	My Favourite New Singer		Won	
2019	GG POP MUSIC	The Best New Performer		Bronze	
2020	Metro Radio Music Awards	Popular Idol Award		Won	
2020	GG POP MUSIC	Annual Leap Forward Singer		Bronze	
2020	GG POP MUSIC	Fans Vote My Favourite Male Singer		Won	
2020	Music Onair Awards	My Favourite Choral Song	"Snail (Duet Ver.) (with Anson Kong)"	Won	
2020	Yahoo Asia Multiverse Buzz Awards	Singer-Songwriter Song	"Whale Fall"	Won	
2021	Chill Club Music Awards	Top 10 Songs of the Year (No.6)	"Snail (Duet Ver.) (with Anson Kong)"	Won	
2021	Chill Club Music Awards	Male Singer of the Year		Bronze	
2021	Metro Radio Music Awards	Popular Idol Award		Won	
2022	The 4th KKBOX Hong Kong Music Awards	Top 10 Artists of the Year		Won	
2022	Yahoo Asia Multiverse Buzz Awards	Top 100 Most Searched Artists		Won	
2022	Yahoo Asia Multiverse Buzz Awards	Top 10 Most Searched Male Artists		Won	
2022	Metro Radio Music Awards	Popular Singer-Songwriter		Won	
2022	Ultimate Song Chart Awards Presentation 2022	Ultimate Singer-Songwriter		Bronze	
2022	Ultimate Song Chart Awards Presentation 2022	Ultimate Top 10 Songs (No.7)	"A Day To Breathe With You"	Won	
2022	Canadian Chinese Pop Music Awards	Top 10 Songs	"A Day To Breathe With You"	Won	
2023	Chill Club Music Awards 22/23	Male Singer of the Year		Bronze	
2023	Chill Club Music Awards 22/23	Singer-Songwriter of the Year		Silver	
2023	The 5th KKBOX Hong Kong Music Awards	Top 10 Artists of the Year		Won	
2023	Metro Radio Music Awards	Popular Male Artist		Won	
2023	Ultimate Song Chart Awards Presentation 2023	Ultimate Male Artist		Bronze	
2023	Ultimate Song Chart Awards Presentation 2023	Ultimate Singer-Songwriter		Bronze	
2023	Ultimate Song Chart Awards Presentation 2023	My Favourite Male Singer		Nominated	
2023	Canadian Chinese Pop Music Awards	Top 10 Songs	"Farewell, Sea of Tranquillity"	Won	
2024	The 6th KKBOX Hong Kong Music Awards	Top 10 Artists of the Year		Won	
2024	Metro Radio Music Awards	Popular Singer-Songwriter		Silver	
2025	Ultimate Song Chart Awards Presentation 2024	Ultimate Male Artist		Gold	
2025	Ultimate Song Chart Awards Presentation 2024	Ultimate Music Record	"Interlude"	Won	
2025	Ultimate Song Chart Awards Presentation 2024	Ultimate Singer-Songwriter		Gold	
2025	Ultimate Song Chart Awards Presentation 2024	My Favourite Male Singer		Nominated	
2025	Ultimate Song Chart Awards Presentation 2024	My Favourite Song	"Solitude"	Nominated	
