= Mama's Affair (2022 film) =

2022 Hong Kong film by Kearen Pang

- Promotional poster
- Traditional Chinese: 阿媽有咗第二個
- Simplified Chinese: 阿媽有咗第二個
- Literal meaning: Mother Has a Second One
- Hanyu Pinyin: Ā mā yǒu zuo dì èr gè
- Directed by: Kearen Pang
- Written by: Kearen Pang
- Produced by: Mani Fok; Kearen Pang
- Starring: Teresa Mo; Keung To; Jer Lau; Kaki Sham; Tang Lai Ying
- Cinematography: Oliver Lau
- Edited by: J. Him Lee; Jojo Shek; Kearen Pang
- Music by: Alan Wong; Janet Yung
- Production companies: Emperor Film; Film Development Fund
- Distributed by: Emperor Film
- Release date: 11 August 2022
- Running time: 127 minutes
- Country: Hong Kong
- Languages: Cantonese; English; Korean
- Budget: HK$10 million (US$1.29 million)
- Box office: est. HK$40.18 million (US$5.17 million)

Mama's Affair (Chinese: 阿媽有咗第二個) is a 2022 Hong Kong drama film written and directed by Kearen Pang. Starring Teresa Mo, Keung To, Jer Lau, Kaki Sham and Tang Lai Ying, the film follows a former talent manager and housewife, who discovers a new star, then she finds it difficult to balance her family and her career life. The film had its world premiere at 17th Osaka Asian Film Festival in competition section on 12 March 2022, and was released on 11 August 2022 in Hong Kong.

The film was invited to 21st New York Asian Film Festival, where it had its New York premiere on 26 July.

Produced with a budget of HK$10 million (US$1.29 million), the film has grossed HK$40.18 million (US$5.17 million) as of 9 November 2022 and currently it is the fourth highest-grossing, Hong Kong-produced film of 2022.

== Synopsis ==
As Yu Mei Fung, housewife and former top artiste manager, discovers a new star in Fong Ching, she also draws jealousy from her teenage son Jonathan Lo Tsz Hin. A single mother struggles to find balance between her family and her career. (From New York Asian Film Festival)

== Cast ==
- Teresa Mo as Yu Mei Fung
- Keung To as Fong Ching
- Jer Lau as Jonathan Lo Tsz Hin
- Kaki Sham as Ka Kei
- Tang Lai Ying as Ann
- CY Chan as Tim

== Production ==
Mama's Affair marks the film debut of Mirror members Keung To and Jer Lau.

The film was shot in and around Yau Ma Tei, Wing Fat Tea restaurant and Canton Road, which is full of street signs, as the background to illustrate the daily life of Fang Qing (Keung To) as a delivery boy of the tea restaurant, to give Hong Kong-style feelings.

Wah Yan College, Hong Kong was hired for filming.

== Release ==
The film had its world premiere at 17th Osaka Asian Film Festival in competition section on 12 March 2022. In June 2022, it was invited to the 2022 Taipei Film Festival in Asian Prism section and was screened on 26 June. It was also invited at the 21st New York Asian Film Festival, where it was screened at Lincoln center on July 26 for its New York Premier. It was theatrically released on 11 August 2022 in Hong Kong.

Trinity Cine Asia acquired rights for distribution of the film in the United Kingdom. It was released theatrically in the United Kingdom on 19 August

== Reception ==
=== Box office ===
The film opened with HK$1.7 million, which is a record for Chinese-language films in Hong Kong in 2022.

As of 25 September 2022 the film is the fourth highest-grossing, Hong Kong-produced film released in the year 2022 with gross of HK$37,110,797.

=== Critical response ===
Edmund Lee of the South China Morning Post classed the film "a minor gem" and rated it with 3.5 out of 5 stars. Appreciating it, Lee wrote, "there are so many moments of authentic humour and emotion throughout Pang’s meticulously scripted story that Mama’s Affair must be recognised as a rare commercial product that nevertheless manages to stay true to its filmmaker’s artistic sensitivity." Casey Chong writing in Screen HK rated the film with 3.5 out of 5 stars and praising the performances of star cast wrote, "It [the film] certainly has its few worthwhile moments and so do the aforementioned great acting performances, which still made Mama’s Affair a decent experience. Phuong Le of The Guardian rated the film with 2 stars out of 5 and wrote, "Teresa Mo’s measured performance, in spite of the cliche-ridden dialogue, is the real highlight of a film that is otherwise an empty star vehicle best enjoyed by fans." James Luxford, the City A.M.'s film editor commented the film "While not a classic of Hong Kong cinema, Mama’s Affair does just enough to keep both sides of the age gap entertained, with warm family values moving in sync with pop hits".

== Awards and nominations ==
| Year | Award | Category | Nominated work | Result | Ref. |
|---|---|---|---|---|---|
| 2023 | Hong Kong Film Award | Best Actress | Teresa Mo | Nominated | |
| 2023 | Hong Kong Film Award | Best Supporting Actor | Law Wing-cheung | Nominated | |
| 2023 | Hong Kong Film Award | Best New Performer | Jer Lau | Nominated | |
| 2023 | Hong Kong Film Award | Best Original Film Song | "Forever"; Composer：Alan Wong Ngai Lun, Janet Yung Wai Ying; Lyricist：Chan Wing Him; Vocal Artist：Keung To | Nominated | |
