= Keung To =

Hong Kong singer

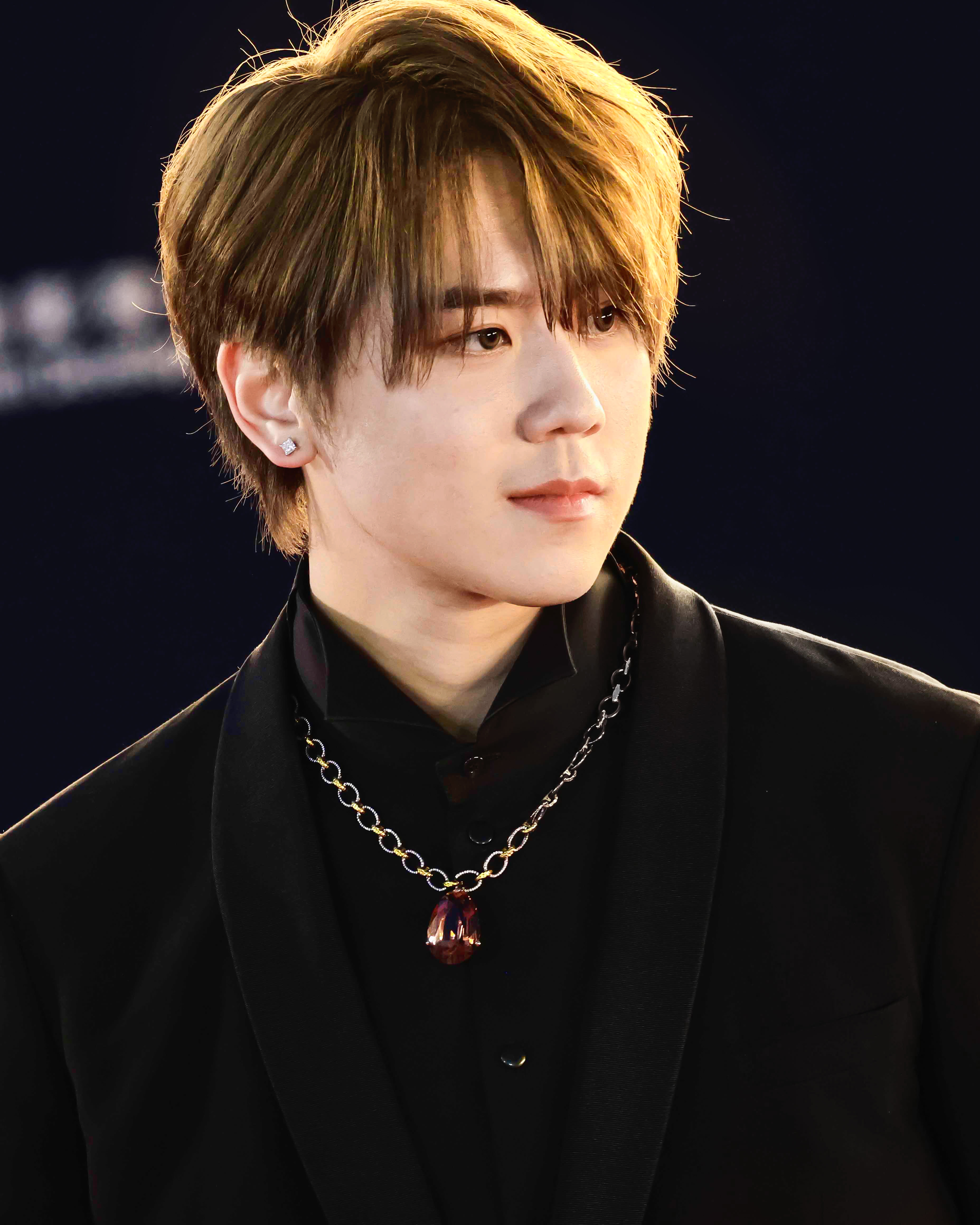
- Keung in 2023
- Born: 30 April 1999 (age 27)
- Occupations: Singer; dancer; actor
- Agent: HKTVE
- Musical career
- Genres: Cantopop; dance pop; R&B; hip-hop
- Instrument: Vocals
- Years active: 2018–present
- Label: Music Nation
- Member of: Mirror

Chinese name
- Traditional Chinese: 姜濤
- Simplified Chinese: 姜涛
Transcriptions
Standard Mandarin
- Hanyu Pinyin: Jiāng Tāo
- Bopomofo: ㄐㄧㄤ ㄊㄠ
Yue: Cantonese
- Jyutping: goeng^{1} tou^{4}
- IPA: [kœŋ˥ tʰɔw˩]

Keung To (Chinese: 姜濤; born 30 April 1999) is a Hong Kong singer, actor, and a member of the Hong Kong boy band group Mirror. He rose to fame after winning ViuTV's reality talent competition Good Night Show - King Maker in 2018. Keung made his solo debut in June 2019 with the single "No. 1 Seed" (一號種籽). His fans are known as "Ginger Candy" (姜糖).

Keung won the My Favourite Male Singer (2020, 2021, 2024 and 2025) and My Favourite Song award (2020-2025) at the Ultimate Song Chart Awards Presentation. He is the youngest ever to do so.

== Early life and education ==
Keung To was born on 30 April 1999. He is an only child. He attended Oi Kwan Road Baptist Church Lui Kwok Pat Fong Kindergarten, Hennessy Road Government Primary P.M. School, Tang Shiu Kin Victoria Government Secondary School, and graduated with a diploma from Yeo Chei Man Senior Secondary School.

In 2017, Keung participated in the Mainland Chinese talent show Super Boy. He was victorious in the regional trials, becoming one of the four representatives of the region of Hong Kong, Macau and Taiwan. He finished in the top 30.

== Music career ==
=== 2018–present: Mirror ===
In 2018, Keung participated in the television reality talent show, Good Night Show - King Maker (Chinese: 全民造星) created by ViuTV as contestant #99. On 14 October, he won the competition, finishing with a combined score of 21.4%, determined by a professional judging panel and public votes.

On 3 November 2018, Keung made his debut as a member of boy music group, Mirror, at a press conference with their debut single "In a Second" (一秒間).

=== 2019–2021: Early solo activities ===
In June 2019, Keung made his solo debut with the release of "Seed No.1" (一號種籽), quickly climbing the mainstream pop music charts, topping at third place.

In July, he held a solo concert, for which tickets quickly sold out. His following two singles, "Atlantis" (亞特蘭提斯), released in September, and "A Little More A Day" (一天多一點), in December, both charted on Hong Kong pop music charts.

In 2020, the COVID-19 pandemic interrupted his plans to South Korea to film a music video for a new song that had already been produced. In response to the pandemic, Keung released the single "The Love Without Words" (also known as "Saying I Love You With My Mouth Covered"; 蒙着嘴說愛你). The music video, directed by Fen Yuen, emphasised the pandemic's effects on the lifestyle of Hongkongers. "The Love Without Words" won Most Popular Song at the 2020 Ultimate Song Chart Awards Presentation. Keung also won Most Popular Male Singer at the same award show.

On 2 September 2020, Keung released his fifth single "Disease of Loneliness" (孤獨病). In contrast with the styles of his previous songs, the lyrics for this single evokes a deep sadness, revolving around Keung's personal experiences with no girlfriends. Keung created and directed the concept of the song's music video, shot in one continuous take. On 15 November, Keung released his sixth single "Love Visa Application" (愛情簽證申請). The song and music video were recorded and produced in Taiwan. Keung participated in writing the lyrics of the song and the story of the music video.

On 19 March 2021, Keung released "Master Class", a Reggaeton and Blues song, receiving widespread positive feedback. On 29 May 2021, "Master Class" became Keung's first single to top four Hong Kong mainstream music charts. His eighth single, "Dear My Friend," was released on 5 August 2021. The ballad details his grief for his late friend Kin Lam who died unexpectedly in March 2021. The single topped the weekly local streaming charts on KKBOX, Moov and Joox for four weeks. The song also won Most Popular Song at the 2021 Ultimate Song Chart Awards Presentation, making him the only winner to have won both Most Popular Song and Most Popular Male Singer in consecutive years. On 27 August, Error member Fatboy and Keung released the single "Agent Fat Keung 2.0" (特務肥姜2.0), as a continuation from their first performance together (特務肥姜), in Good Night Show - King Maker.

=== 2021–2023: Self-inspection period ===
In September 2021, Keung announced the completion of the conceptual design of his 9th solo project, which also incorporated a mini documentary series, released via the Mirror YouTube Channel. Part 1 of the documentary was released on 9 November 2021, titled "Answers" with the second part titled "Questions" released in on 19 November. Keung expressed that the aim of the docuseries is to show people his most authentic self. In the series, he openly talked about dealing with the immense pressure and how it has affected his emotional health. "Spiegel Im Spiegel" 《鏡中鏡》, Keung's ninth solo song made its debut on stage at the MOOV Music on the Road concert, held on 7 December 2021. Keung incorporated krumping in the choreography of this particular performance to express the angst induced by the sense of isolation and self doubt that came with fame. The final part of his docuseries was released on 26 January 2022 where he left himself a reminder of how he dealt with the emotional lows.

He collaborated with singer-songwriter AGA on the single "I Know", released on 16 December, his first duet with a female vocalist.

Keung released his 10th solo work "What the Work Says" as a present to the fans on his 23rd birthday (30 April 2022), a piece that took a Lennon-esque stance against war and violence recorded at the early stages of the Russian invasion of Ukraine. The music video marked the second directorial work by Keung and is a more ambitious piece that drew influences from Broadway productions, and was nominated for best music video in the Asian Television Awards in the same year.

Mirror's public activities came to a halt in July 2022 after a serious incident at the group's concert that left two dancers with severe injuries. All the members, including Keung, had to take a leave of absence, and they only returned to public eye to promote the TV series "We Got Game" in October 2022. However, on 11 November, Keung suffered an accident during the 903 All Star Basket Game that left him hospitalized with injuries to his knee and Achille's heel, requiring surgery and a prolonged recovery.

Despite a long hiatus and only releasing two songs in the year, Keung still received accolades at multiple music awards, including Commercial Radio's Ultimate Song Chart Awards, winning 4th place of "Top 10 Ultimate Songs" with "Spiegel Im Spiegel," and the My Favourite Song Award with "What the Work Says." The performance marked Keung's return to stage after recovering from surgery. His emotional and physical condition during the performance led to a slurry of criticism and attacks on social media.

In response, Keung released his 11th single "Dummy", a song about self-deprecation, in which he reminds himself to stay level headed and never become a mindless dummy. During interview at this period, Keung admitted that he had to dig deep to deal with the negativity resulting from the media attacks but appreciated all the criticism which gave him a chance to inspect his own flaws and improve. He debuted the song live at HKT West Kowloon Music Festival on 2 April 2023, which later Keung described as "one of the most important performances of his career".

=== 2023–present: First solo concert and increasing market reach ===
Keung held "Waves: In my sight 2023" at the AsiaWorld Arena with four sold-out shows in August 2023. He released his twelfth single "Ocean" 《濤》 as the title song for this concert series, and collaborated with master choreographer Mui Cheuk-Yin on a much acclaimed opening medley that infused contemporary and Chinese dance styles into the performance. The song won "My Favourite Song Award" at the Ultimate Song Chart Awards in 2023 with record breaking number of votes received, and this marked the 4th year winning streak for Keung and a first ever in the award's history. "Ocean" also came 6th in the Professional Recommendation segment of the Top 10 Ultimate Song Awards Presentation in 2023.

Keung performed two unreleased songs at his solo concert. "You are out of this world," a tribute to his fans for their unwavering support and "Every Single Time", an R&B influenced love song written by Louis Cheung.

On 23 November 2023, released his 13th solo single "The Irregulars", written and arranged by Terence Lam with lyrics by Wyman Wong. The song was seen as a continuation to the story in "Love Visa Application" with the music video shot predominantly in Taiwan, starring actress Tammy Lin who was also featured in the previous video.

Keung teamed up again with lyricist Siu Hak on his 14th single "Dark Moon", a song about the duality of humanity and how greed and other sins can drive one to give in to the unrestrained desires, and the only path to resist that temptation is to be reminded of one's purest intent. This also marked the first time Keung worked with producer T-Ma, who also wrote and arranged the music.

The promotional single "Bread and Better" marked the first English/Mandarin collaboration between Keung, Gareth Tong and Singaporean singer-songwriter Gentle Bones. The music video was released on 24 February 2024 on HSBC Singapore's YouTube channel.

"You are out of this world" was released on 30 April 2024 on Keung's 25th birthday as a present to his fans.

Every Single Time was released on 7 August 2024 which is directed by Stephen Fung.

== Acting career ==
Keung made his acting debut on the ViuTV television series Retire to Queen. Keung made a cameo appearance in the youth drama series We are the Littles, which aired in December 2020. He starred in the drama series Ink at Tai Ping, which aired in January 2021. In August 2020, Keung began filming for Taiwanese drama Sometimes When We Touch. Filming concluded on 15 November. The series began airing in August 2021. He made his film debut in the Kearen Pang film Mama's Affair, in which he co-stars with Teresa Mo and Jer Lau.

Keung starred as Jack in the film My Heavenly City (2023), a Taiwanese student living in New York.

In 2024, Keung made a special appearance in the heist film The Moon Thieves as Uncle, the unhinged and arrogant son of a deceased underground watch dealer. Keung starred in the action comedy We 12 alongside members of Mirror.

On 24 June 2025, he felt sick and fell into the sea at Central and Western District Promenade after running, then he was sent to the Queen Mary Hospital.

== Discography ==
=== Singles ===
==== As lead artist ====
Title	Year	Peak chart positions	Album
Title	Year	HK (Note: The Billboard Hits of the World charts, including Hong Kong Songs, was first issued on 19 February 2022.)	Album
"Seed No.1" (一號種籽)	2019	—	Non-album singles
"Atlantis" (亞特蘭提斯)	2019	—	Non-album singles
"A Little More a Day" (一天多一點)	2019	—	Non-album singles
"The Love Without Words" (蒙着嘴說愛你)	2020	17	Non-album singles
"Disease of Loneliness" (孤獨病)	2020	17	Non-album singles
"Love Visa Application" (愛情簽證申請) (feat. Jhen F)	2020	—	Non-album singles
"Master Class"	2021	5	Non-album singles
"Dear My Friend,"	2021	1	Non-album singles
"I Know" (feat. AGA)	2021	13	Non-album singles
"Spiegel im Spiegel" (鏡中鏡)	2022	4	Non-album singles
"What The Work Says" (作品的說話)	2022	2	Non-album singles
"Chase" (追)	2023	1	Remembering Leslie
"Dummy"	2023	1	Non-album singles
"The Ocean" (濤)	2023	3	Non-album singles
"The Irregulars" (岩巉)	2023	2	Non-album singles
"Dark Moon" (黑月)	2024	4	Non-album singles
"You're Out Of This World" (好得太過份)	2024	1	Non-album singles
"Every Single Time"	2024	1	Non-album singles
“Ginkgo”	2025	1	Non-album singles
"On a Sunny Day"	2025	1	Non-album singles

==== Collaborations ====
Title	Year
"BMG - Be My Girl" (with Anson Lo)	2019
"Agent Fat Keung 2.0" (with Fatboy)	2021

==== Soundtrack appearances ====
Title	Year	Album
Love Doesn't Make a Sound" (愛不作聲) (with Anson Lo)	2021	Sometimes When We Touch OST
"Forever" (風雨不改)	2022	Mama's Affair OST
"I Need You In My Li(f)e"	2024	My Lovely Liar OST

== Filmography ==
=== Film ===
Year	Title	Original Title	Role	Notes/Ref.
2019	Love Before Birthday	戀愛要在生日前	Keung	Music Film
2022	Mama's Affair	阿媽有咗第二個	Fong Ching	
2023	My Heavenly City	我的天堂城市	Jack	Filmed in NYC
2024	The Moon Thieves	盜月者	Uncle	Special Appearance
2024	We 12	12怪盜	K.T.	

=== Television series ===
Year	Title	Original Title	Role	Notes
2019	Retire to Queen	退休女皇	Keung Tai Man (William)	Ep 1, 10, 11, 13–15, 17-20
2020	We are the Littles	男排女將	Keung B	Ep 17, 18 Cameo
2021	Ink at Tai Ping	太平紋身店	Ip Tin Ching	
2021	Sometimes When We Touch	超感應學園	Ma Ying Chen (French Toast)	
2022	We Got Game	季前賽	Ko Ka Hau	
2024	Cicada Cycle	十七年命運週期	McDonald's Manager	Ep 2 Cameo
2024	My Lovely Liar (HK)	無用的謊言	Man Cho Wo	

=== Variety show ===
Year	Title	Original Title	Notes
2018	Good Night Show - King Maker	Good Night Show 全民造星	Contestant No. 99
2018	Mirror Go	—N/a	
2019	Mirror Go 2	—N/a	
2019	King Maker II	全民造星II	Ep 1–13, 22–23, 27, 28, 32, 35, 37, 40, 43-46
2021	Battle Feel	考有Feel	Ep 1, 2, 7, 8, 13, 14, 19, 20
2021	Be a Better MIRROR	調教你MIRROR	
2021	One Day Store Manager	全民·造星級店長	
2023	King Maker V Final	全民造星V 總決賽	Performer
2023	Shiny Summer - MIRROR+	全星暑假 - MIRROR+	
2023	MIRROR Time	—N/a	
2024	Mirror Chef	—N/a	

== Concerts ==
=== Solo ===
Year	Date	Name	Venue	Notes/Ref.
2019	11–12, 26 July	Seed #1 Mini Concert	Music Zone, KITEC	
2023	2–5 August	"Waves" In My Sight Solo Concert 2023	AsiaWorld–Arena	

=== Collaborations ===
Year	Date	Name	Venue	Collaborating Artist(s)
2021	27 September	903 Music is Live Concert	AsiaWorld–Arena	Terence Lam, Jer Lau, Tyson Yoshi
2021	7–8 December	MOOV LIVE Music on the Road	Hall 5BC, HKCEC	Anson Kong, Anson Lo, Edan Lui, Ian Chan, Jer Lau

== Accolades ==
=== Awards and nominations ===
Music

Name of the award ceremony, year presented, recipient(s) of the award, award category and the result of the nomination
Award	Year (Note: Indicates the year of ceremony. Each year is linked to the article about the awards held that year, wherever possible.)	Nominee / Work	Category	Result	Ref.
Asian Television Awards	2022	What the Work Says (作品的說話)	Best Music Video	Nominated	
Chill Club Music Awards	2021	"Love Visa Application"	Top 10 Songs of the Year	Won	
Chill Club Music Awards	2021	Keung To	Male Singer of the Year	Silver	
Chill Club Music Awards	2021	Keung To	Singer-songwriter of the Year	Nominated	
Chill Club Music Awards	2021	Keung To	Lyricist of the Year	Nominated	
Joox Top Music Awards	2020	"The Love Without Words"	Top 10 Recommended Local Songs of the Year	Won	
Joox Top Music Awards	2021	"Dear My Friend,"	Top 10 Recommended Local Songs of the Year	Won	
Metro Radio Music Awards	2019	Keung To	Popular Idol Award	Won	
Metro Radio Music Awards	2020	Keung To	Popular Idol Award	Won	
Metro Radio Music Awards	2021	Keung To	I Support Singer Award	Won	
Metro Radio Music Awards	2021	"Master Class"	I Support Songs Award	Nominated	
Metro Radio Music Awards	2021	"Dear My Friend,"	I Support Songs Award	Nominated	
Metro Radio Music Awards	2021	"Agent Fat Keung 2.0"	I Support Songs Award	Nominated	
Metro Radio Music Awards	2021	"Love Visa Application"	I Support Songs Award	Nominated	
Top Ten Chinese Gold Songs Award	2019	Keung To	Best Prospect Award	Gold	
Top Ten Chinese Gold Songs Award	2020	Keung To	Male Singer Award	Bronze	
Top Ten Chinese Gold Songs Award	2020	"A Little More A Day"	Top 10 Songs Award	Nominated	
Top Ten Chinese Gold Songs Award	2020	"The Love Without Words"	Top 10 Songs Award	Nominated	
Top Ten Chinese Gold Songs Award	2020	"Disease of Loneliness"	Top 10 Songs Award	Nominated	
Ultimate Song Chart Awards Presentation	2019	Keung To	Ultimate Newcomer	Bronze	
Ultimate Song Chart Awards Presentation	2019	Keung To	My Favourite Male Singer	Final 5	
Ultimate Song Chart Awards Presentation	2019	"No. 1 Seed"	My Favourite Song	Final 5	
Ultimate Song Chart Awards Presentation	2020	Keung To	My Favourite Male Singer	Won	
Ultimate Song Chart Awards Presentation	2020	"The Love Without Words"	My Favourite Song	Won	
Ultimate Song Chart Awards Presentation	2021	Keung To	My Favourite Male Singer	Won	
Ultimate Song Chart Awards Presentation	2021	"Dear My Friend,"	My Favourite Song	Won	
Ultimate Song Chart Awards Presentation	2022	"Spiegel im Spiegel"	Top 10 Ultimate Songs	4th	
Ultimate Song Chart Awards Presentation	2022	"What The Work Says"	My Favourite Song	Won	
Yahoo！Asia Buzz Awards	2018	Keung To	Most Searched Photo for Hong Kong Male Artist	Won	
Yahoo！Asia Buzz Awards	2020	"The Love Without Words"	Most Popular Music Video	Won	

Film and television

Award	Year	Nominee / Work	Category	Result	Ref.
Hong Kong Film Award	2023	"Forever" from Mama's Affair	Best Original Film Song	Nominated	

=== Listicles ===
Name of publisher, name of listicle, and year(s) listed
Publication	List	Year	Ref.
Tatler Asia	Asia's Most Influential	2021	
Variety	Variety's International Breakout Stars of 2021	2021	
