= Jer Lau =

Hong Kong singer

- 柳應廷
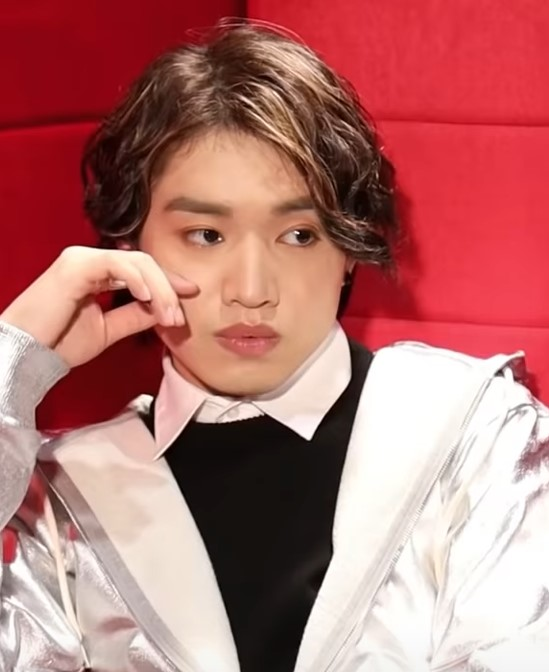
- Lau in 2020
- Born: 20 November 1992 (age 33); British Hong Kong
- Education: Hong Kong Baptist University (AD)
- Occupations: Singer; dancer; actor
- Agent: HKTVE
- Musical career
- Genres: Cantopop; dance pop; soft rock
- Instruments: Vocals; bass; guitar
- Years active: 2018–present
- Label: Music Nation
- Member of: Mirror

Chinese name
- Chinese: 柳應廷
Transcriptions
Standard Mandarin
- Hanyu Pinyin: Liǔ Yìngtíng
- Wade–Giles: Liu Ying-t'ing
Yue: Cantonese
- Jyutping: Lau^{5} Jing^{3} Ting^{4}

Jeremy Lau Ying-ting (Chinese: 柳應廷; born 20 November 1992) is a Hong Kong singer, actor, best known for being a member of the Hong Kong boy band Mirror. Apart from his group activities, Lau has also pursued a solo singing career, winning Best New Performer at the Metro Hit Awards, the Ultimate Song Chart Awards, the Chinese Gold Song Awards, and the Chill Club 20/21 Awards.

== Early life ==
Jeremy Lau Ying-ting was born in Hong Kong on 20 November 1992. He attended Ng Wah Catholic Secondary School and the Hong Kong Baptist University College of International Education. In 2012, Lau formed the pop music band Bromance with his college friends, and was the band's main vocalist and bassist. In 2013, he formed the heavy metal band Joy of Stupidity (Chinese: 子非愚), playing original Cantonese music. Lau participated in a musical class hosted by RTHK and performed as a busker for several years before transitioning to work as an entertainment reporter.

== Musical career ==
=== Mirror ===
In 2018, Lau quit his reporting job to audition for ViuTV's reality talent competition Good Night Show - King Maker, and finished in top 20. While only the top 10 finalists were guaranteed a contract with ViuTV, Jer managed to catch the attention of producer Ahfa Wong, who invited him to join the boy group Mirror. Jer initially declined, but was ultimately convinced. The group debuted on 3 November 2018 with the single "In a Second" (Chinese: 一秒間).

=== Solo Activities ===
Lau's debut single, the soft rock ballad "Tale of Water Torture" (Chinese: 水刑物語) was released on 29 February 2020. "Tale of Water Torture" peaked at number three on the Ultimate 903 Chart, RTHK Chinese Pop Chart and number four on Metro Radio Pop Chart. His second single "Tale of Final Lucidity" (迴光物語), released in August, achieved commercial success, peaking at number one on the Ultimate 903 Chart and ViuTV's Chill Club Chart. He is the eighth artist in history to have a number one single on the Ultimate 903 chart during his debut year. The release of "Tale of Wind Spirit" (風靈物語) in October capped off what was dubbed the Trilogy of Tales (物語系列).

Lau again collaborated with singer-songwriter Ng Lam Fung and lyricist Siu Hak on his fourth solo single "A Madman's Diary" (狂人日記) released 17 March 2021. Lau remarked that "A Madman's Diary" is a tribute to legendary rock band Queen and their song "Bohemian Rhapsody", noting that he wanted to bring something unconventional into the Cantopop scene. The song is also the first of three songs forming the Rebirth Trilogy (重生系列). The progressive rock single topped the Ultimate 903, the Chinese Pop Chart, and the Chill Club Chart. His fifth single, "Castle of Sand" (砂之器) was released on 16 July 2021. On 18 August, it peaked at number one on the Ultimate 903 music chart. On 13 October, Lau released his seventh single "Stellar Moments of Humankind" (人類群星閃耀時). The song takes the same Chinese title as the history book Decisive Moments in History (German: Sternstunden der Menschheit) by Stefan Zweig. Produced by Carl Wong, the song serves as the conclusion to the Rebirth Trilogy.

On 26 January 2022, Lau's single "MM7" was released to streaming platforms and radio stations. The song takes its title from a newly coined slang term "MM7" meaning awesome or fantastic (Chinese: 正), which in turn originated from a typo committed by one of Lau's fans when typing the character using Sucheng input method.

"Rules of Parting" (離別的規矩) was released on 20 April 2022, its music video being released three days later. This was followed by his tenth single "Steps to Self-Destruction" (自毀的程序) on 11 July, and the eleventh single "Watching the Clouds Rise" (坐看雲起時) on 25 November. "Watching the Clouds Rise" charted number one on the Chill Club Chart in 2023, as such the single was nominated for Song of the Year at the Chill Club Awards 22/23.

Lau held his first solo concert Across the Universe at the Hong Kong Convention and Exhibition Centre from 7 to 10 July 2023. He released his first LP I am the I on vinyl on 6 February 2024. A signing event was held on 24 February for 400 fans.

== Acting career ==
Lau made his official acting debut in the 2020 youth sports drama We are the Littles. In 2022, Lau made his film debut in Mama's Affair directed by Kearen Pang. Filming began in August 2021 and concluded in September 2021. Lau has been nominated for best new performer at the 2023 Hong Kong Film Awards. Lau began filming the television series Million Dollar Family in April 2022. The comedy drama premiered on 5 December 2022. Lau made a cameo appearance in the 2023 black comedy film Over My Dead Body.

Makerville announced that all members of Mirror will be starring in the upcoming film We 12.

== Filmography ==
=== Film ===
Year	Title	Chinese title	Role
2022	Mama's Affair	阿媽有咗第二個	Jonathan Lo Tsz-hin
2023	Over My Dead Body	死屍死時四十四	Groom
2024	WE 12	12怪盜	

=== Television series ===
Year	Title	Chinese title	Role	Network	Notes
2019	Dark City	黑市	Younger brother	ViuTV	Cameo appearance (Episode 10: Public House)
2020	We are the Littles	男排女將	Yuan Kai-chung	ViuTV	Supporting role
2022	Million Dollar Family	百萬同居計劃	So Kit	ViuTV	

=== Variety show ===
Year	Title	Chinese title	Role	Network	Notes
2018	Good Night Show - King Maker	Good Night Show 全民造星	Contestant	ViuTV	Contestant no. 10, top 20
2018	Mirror Go	—N/a	Cast member	ViuTV	with Mirror
2019	Mirror Go 2	—N/a	Cast member	ViuTV	with Mirror
2019	King Maker II	全民造星II	Contestant	ViuTV	
2021	Battle Feel	考有Feel	Cast member	ViuTV	with Mirror and Error
2021	Be a Better Mirror	調教你MIRROR	Cast member	ViuTV	with Mirror
2023	Shiny Summer - MIRROR+	全星暑假 - MIRROR+	Cast member	ViuTV	with Mirror
2023–2024	MIRROR Time	—N/a	Cast member	ViuTV	with Mirror
2024	Mirror Chef	—N/a	Cast member	ViuTV	with Mirror

=== Music video appearances ===
Year	Title	Artist	Ref.
2022	"Elevator"	Edan Lui	

== Discography ==
=== Albums ===
- I am the I (2024)

=== Singles ===
==== As lead artist ====
Year	Title	Original title	Album
2020	"Tale of Water Torture"	水刑物語	I am the I
2020	"Tale of Final Lucidity"	迴光物語	I am the I
2020	"Tale of Wind Spirit"	風靈物語	I am the I
2021	"Unfinished" (Duet Ver.) (with One Promise)	明年見	
2021	"A Madman's Diary"	狂人日記	I am the I
2021	"Castle of Sand"	砂之器	I am the I
2021	"Magical Road"	神奇之路	Zero to Hero OST
2021	"Stellar Moments of Humankind"	人類群星閃耀時	I am the I
2022	"MM7"	MM7	I am the I
2022	"Rules of Parting"	離別的規矩	I am the I
2022	"Steps to Self-Destruction"	自毀的程序	I am the I
2022	"Watching the Clouds Rise"	坐看雲起時	I am the I
2023	"A New World From Zero"	從零開始的新世界	
2023	"Salted Fish Game"	鹹魚遊戲	Over My Dead Body OST
2023	"JM Single 9"	JM單身9	
2023	"Dear Children"	Dear Children	
2023	"The Boy from the Sea"	大海少年	
2024	"Melancholy Pen"	筆觸男孩憂鬱之死	
2024	"Dancing to the Full Moon"	約齊靈魂在墳墓開生日派對	
2024	"Moondweller"	月居人	
2024	"Never-ending Story"	沒終點的青春	
2025	"That's Not What You Want"	不要活成自己討厭的模樣	
2025	"Childhood Nostalgia"	大人之後	
2025	"If One Day"	如果一天	
2025	"Echoes of Us"	記憶倒行	
2025	"Unspeakable"	不要說出來	
2025	"Kintsugi"	今繼	
2026	"Freak"	跌在地上的怪獸	
2026	"Indestructible"	金剛不壞	

==== Collaborations ====
Year	Title	Chinese title	Album
2020	"Specimen" (Elisa Chan feat. Jer Lau, Cheung Tin-fu, Eagle Chan, Lucas Chuy, June Leung, Justin Chan)	標本	TBA
2021	"Death of Pop" (Ng Lam-fung)	樂壇已死	TBA
2021	"Quantum Entanglement" (Faith Yang feat. Jer Lau)	糾纏	Trinity of Shadows OST

== Concerts ==
=== Solo ===
Year	Date	Name	Venue	Note
2023	7–10 July	JER LAU “ACROSS THE UNIVERSE” IN MY SIGHT SOLO CONCERT 2023	HALL 5BC, HKCEC	
2025	30 Nov - 1 Dec	JER LAU “THE SHAPE OF BREATHING" LIVE 2025	ARENA, AsiaWorld-Expo	
2026	23-24 May	JER LAU “THE SHADE OF BREATHING" LIVE 2026	ARENA, AsiaWorld-Expo	

=== Collaborations ===
Year	Date	Name	Venue	Collaborating Artist(s)
2021	27 September	903 Music is Live Concert	AsiaWorld–Arena	Terence Lam, Keung To, Tyson Yoshi
2021	7–8 December	MOOV LIVE Music on the Road	Hall 5BC, HKCEC	Anson Kong, Anson Lo, Edan Lui, Ian Chan, Keung To
2024	30–31 August	KATCH OUR LIFE Jer Lau x MC Cheung	AsiaWorld–Arena	MC Cheung
2024	5–6 October	MATCHICAL LIVE 2024	Hall 5BC, HKCEC	Jeremy Lee, Stanley Yau, Marf Yau, Sumling Li, Winka Chan

== Awards and nominations ==
Music Awards

Award	Year	Nominee / Work	Category	Result	Ref.
Chill Club Awards	2021	"Tale of Final Lucidity"	Top 10 Songs of the Year	7th	
Chill Club Awards	2021	Jer Lau	Best New Performer	Won	
Chill Club Awards	2021	Jer Lau	Male Singer of the Year	Nominated	
Chill Club Awards	2022	"A Madman's Diary"	Top 10 Songs of the Year	6th	
JOOX Top Music Awards	2020	Jer Lau	Singers Recommended by Editors	Won	
JOOX Top Music Awards	2021	Jer Lau	Singers Recommended by Editors	Won	
Metro Radio Music Awards	2020	Jer Lau	Best New Performer	Won	
Metro Radio Music Awards	2021	Jer Lau	Best Male Singer	Won	
Metro Radio Music Awards	2021	Jer Lau	I Support Singer	Nominated	
Metro Radio Music Awards	2021	"A Madman's Diary"	I Support Songs	Nominated	
Metro Radio Music Awards	2021	"Castle of Sand"	I Support Songs	Nominated	
Metro Radio Music Awards	2021	"Stellar Moments of Humankind"	I Support Songs	Nominated	
Top Ten Chinese Gold Songs Award	2020	Jer Lau	Best New Performer	Bronze	
Top Ten Chinese Gold Songs Award	2020	Jer Lau	Best Male Singer	Nominated	
Top Ten Chinese Gold Songs Award	2020	"Tale of Water Torture"	Top 10 Songs	Nominated	
Ultimate Song Chart Awards Presentation	2020	Jer Lau	Best New Performer	Gold	
Ultimate Song Chart Awards Presentation	2020	Jer Lau	My Favorite Male Singer	Nominated	
Ultimate Song Chart Awards Presentation	2020	"Tale of Water Torture"	My Favorite Song	Nominated	
Ultimate Song Chart Awards Presentation	2021	"A Madman's Diary"	Top 10 Songs	6th	
Ultimate Song Chart Awards Presentation	2021	"A Madman's Diary"	My Favorite Song	Nominated	
Ultimate Song Chart Awards Presentation	2021	Jer Lau	My Favorite Male Singer	Nominated	
Yahoo！Asia Buzz Awards	2020	Jer Lau	Best New Performer	Won	

Film Awards

Award	Year	Nominee / Work	Category	Result	Ref.
Hong Kong Film Award	2022	"神奇之路"(Zero to Hero) from Zero to Hero	Best Original Film Song	Nominated	
Hong Kong Film Award	2023	Mama's Affair	Best New Performer	Nominated	
