= Tyson Yoshi =

Hong Kong singer-songwriter (born 1994)

- 程浚彥
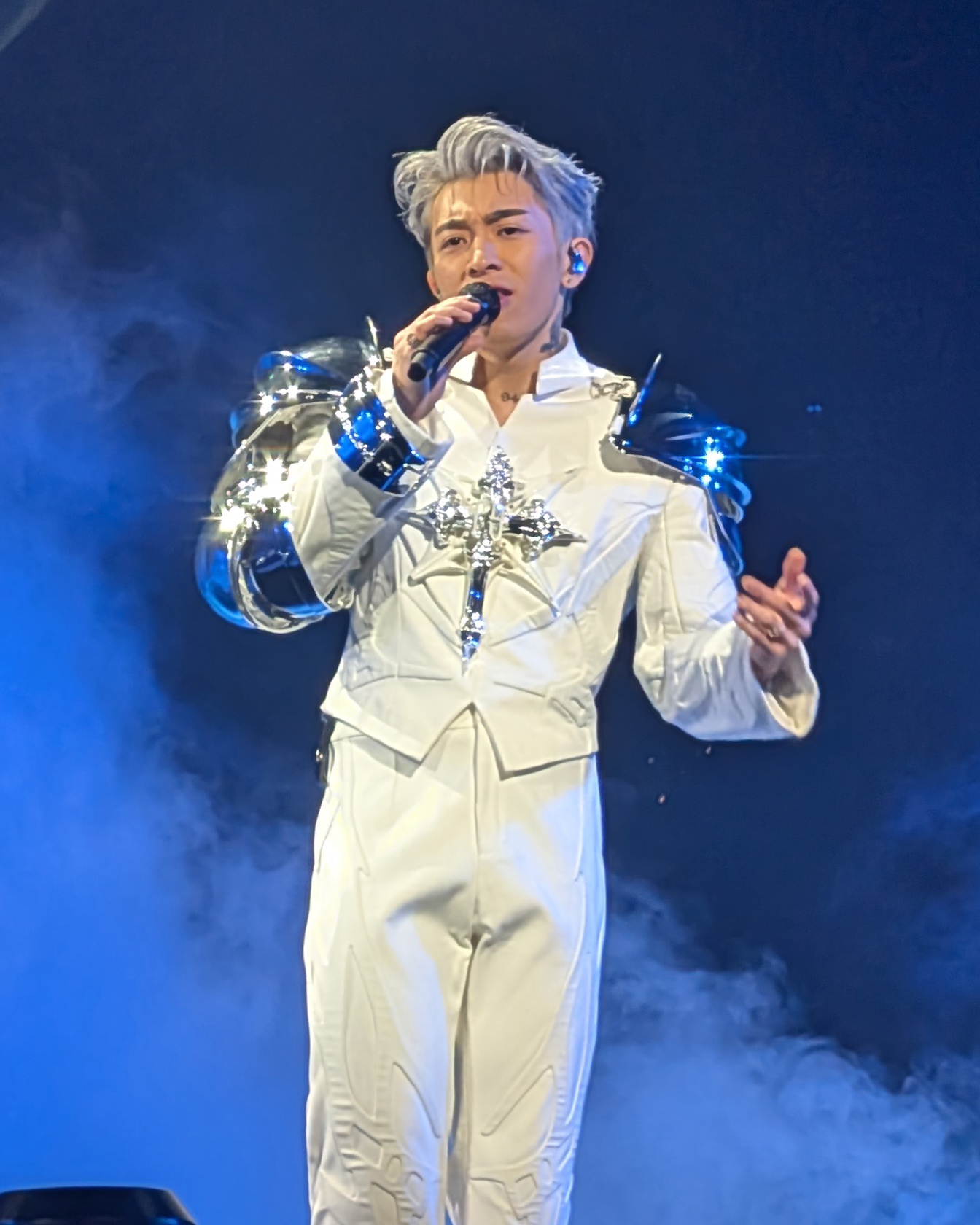
- Tyson Yoshi at his concert in 2026
- Born: Ben Cheng Tsun Yin; 17 July 1994 (age 32); Hong Kong
- Other name: T.Y.
- Education: Graduated from the Interior Architecture Department
- Alma mater: Pun U Association Wah Yan Primary School; Hong Kong Tang King Po College; Sedbergh School; University of Brighton
- Occupations: Musician; Rapper; Songwriter; Retail Store Designer; Model
- Years active: 2018
- Notable work: To My Queen
- Height: 1.75 m (5 ft 9 in)
- Spouse: Christy Lee (m. 2025)

Chinese name
- Traditional Chinese: 程浚彥
- Simplified Chinese: 程浚彦
Transcriptions
Standard Mandarin
- Hanyu Pinyin: Chéng Jùnyàn
Yue: Cantonese
- Yale Romanization: Chìhng jeun yihn
- Jyutping: cing4 zeon3 yin6
- Musical career
- Also known as: TY, Tyson
- Origin: Hong Kong
- Genres: Hip hop, Rap, R&B, Soul
- Labels: GREYTONE (2018-2019); JUST KIDDING Ltd. (2019-Present)
- Website: linkin.bio/tysonyoshi

Ben Cheng Tsun Yin (Chinese: 程浚彥; born 17 July 1994), better known by his stage name Tyson Yoshi, is a Hong Kong singer-songwriter, and MV director. He made his debut in 2018 with his single "To My Queen".

== Career ==
Tyson Yoshi attended Sedbergh School in the United Kingdom and later studied interior architecture at the University of Brighton. In 2018, he started producing music in Taiwan and debuted with the single, "To My Queen". In July 2019, he became famous with "Christy", a song written to his girlfriend. "Christy" went on to accumulate more than one million views on YouTube, the first of his songs to do so.

The name "Tyson Yoshi" derives from his first name's initialism, "T.Y". "Tyson" was one of his middle-school nicknames, and "Yoshi" is from Yoshinoya, a food chain found widely across Hong Kong.

Tyson Yoshi started as an independent singer in 2018. His first album, 1st, was released in 2019. He is one of Hong Kong's artists, with lots of streams on Spotify in 2019. In 2021, his popularity surged again after his performance in Music is Live with Terence Lam, Keung To and Jer Lau. As of 2022, Christy has garnered views on YouTube.

== Personal life ==
On 6 June 2024, Tyson Yoshi proposed to his girlfriend of 7 years, Christy, on stage during his concert in Vancouver. The couple married in 2025 and held their wedding in La Foce.

In recent years, Tyson Yoshi has been dubbed the "Gangster of the entertainment industry" due to a series of cyberbullying incidents involving ordinary netizens, and was even called a fraud by disaster victims because of the Wang Fuk Court donation incident.

== Discography ==
=== Studio albums ===
Title	Album details
1st	Released: 1 September 2019; Label: Just Kidding Limited; Formats: Digital download
2nd Pre Evolution	Released: 21 April 2023; Label: Just Kidding Limited; Formats: CD, LP, cassette, digital download

=== Singles ===
Title	Year	Peak chart positions	Album
Title	Year	HK	Album
"To My Queen"	2018	—	1st
"Bae"	2018	—	1st
"She Said"	2019	—	1st
"Christy"	2019	—	Non-album singles
"She Said Pt. 2" (feat. Marz23)	2020	—	Non-album singles
"Growing Up"	2020	—	Non-album singles
"Something"	2020	—	Non-album singles
"Stressed Out"	2021	—	Non-album singles
"Stranger" (feat. Panda)	2021	—	Non-album singles
"In My Dream"	2021	—	Non-album singles
"Better"	2021	—	2nd Pre Evolution
"That Guy"	2021	—	2nd Pre Evolution
"i don't smoke & i don't drink"	2022	21	2nd Pre Evolution
"if i die tonight"	2022	22	2nd Pre Evolution
"Self-made (Something Pt. 2)"	2022	—	Non-album single
"Optimistic"	2023	—	2nd Pre Evolution
"be mine"	2023	—	2nd Pre Evolution
"see you in hell"	2023	—	Non-album singles
"Glad That We Met" (你不會一輩子的愛上我)	2023	13	Non-album singles
"LosE tO yOu"	2024	—	Non-album singles
"would you be mine?"	2024	1	Non-album singles

=== Collaborations ===
Title	Year	Peak chart positions	Album
Title	Year	HK	Album
"Let Go" (with Akiko, JNYBeatz)	2019	—	Non-album single
"To My Boss" (with TomFatKi)	2019	—	1st
"Right Here" (with TIAB)	2019	—	Non-album singles
"4 Get Bout U" (忘記你) (with Patrick Brasca)	2020	—	Non-album singles
"Fly" (with Aleebi, VUCHS)	2020	—	Non-album singles
"December" (with Gareth.T)	2021	—	2nd Pre Evolution
"2nd Favourite" (第二最愛) (with Leo Ku)	2022	9	Non-album singles
"Just Break Up" (with SHOU)	2023	—	Non-album singles
"Fuck You & Your Friends" (with Patrick Brasca)	2024	—	Non-album singles

== Performance works ==
=== Concerts ===
Solo

Date	Concert Name	No. of Shows	Venue	Note
18 August 2019	Tyson Yoshi 1st Show	1	This Town Needs	
22 November 2019	Tyson Yoshi 1st Show in Taipei	1	The Wall Live House	
25–26 June 2021	Hi I'm Back Mini Live Concert 2021	2	Music Zone, KITEC	
24 April 2022	2020 Hi I'm Back London Live	1	Electric Brixton	
30 April 2022	2020 Hi I'm Back Birmingham Live	1	The Crossing	
4 May 2022	2020 Hi I'm Back Manchester Live	1	Club Academy	
5–8 August 2022	TYSON YOSHI《MY NEW WORLD ORDER》	4	Star Hall, KITEC	
30 March 2023	TYSON YOSHI《MY NEW WORLD ORDER》LIVE IN TAIPEI	1	Zepp New Taipei	
19 May 2023	TYSON YOSHI《MY NEW WORLD ORDER》LIVE IN MALAYSIA	1	The Bee, Publika	
6 June 2024	TYSON YOSHI "LIVE IN CANADA 2024" - Vancouver	1	Vogue Theatre	
10–11 June 2024	TYSON YOSHI "LIVE IN CANADA 2024" - Toronto	2	The Opera House	
23 October 2024	TYSON YOSHI "LIVE IN UK 2024" - London	1	Troxy	
24 October 2024	TYSON YOSHI "LIVE IN UK 2024" - Manchester	1	Rebellion Manchester	
27 October 2024	TYSON YOSHI "LIVE IN UK 2024" - Edinburgh	1	La Belle Angele	
13 November 2024	TYSON YOSHI "LIVE IN AUSTRALIA 2024" - Sydney	1	The Metro Theatre	
17 November 2024	TYSON YOSHI "LIVE IN AUSTRALIA 2024" - Melbourne	1	Max Watt's	

Concert participation

Date	Concert Name	Concert Number	Venue	Note
27 September 2021	拉闊音樂會風火雷電 903 Music is Live Concert	1	AsiaWorld–Arena, AsiaWorld–Expo	
1 October 2022	TONE Music Festival 2022	1	AsiaWorld–Arena, AsiaWorld–Expo	
11 December 2022	UNIK Asia Festival	1	Central Harbourfront Event Space, Central Harbourfront	
11 February 2023	Tyson Yoshi x Serrini:《DuoVerse》	1	Rotunda 3, KITEC	
11 March 2023	PUNCH Live 2023	1	AsiaWorld–Arena, AsiaWorld–Expo	
16 December 2023	MOOV LIVE TYSON YOSHI x GARETH.T	1	Hong Kong Convention and Exhibition Centre Hall 5BC	

=== TV Shows ===
Year	Title	Network	Note
2023	Where Do Do You Go	HOYTV	

=== TV Shows (ViuTV) ===
- Chill Club（Episode 115）

== Awards and nominations ==
=== Personal Awards and Nominations ===
Year	Award Ceremony	Award Category	Nominated Work	Result
2022	The 20th CASH Golden Sail Music Awards	CASH Best Song Award	"I don't smoke & I don't drink"	Nominated
2022	TONE Music Awards 2022	Future Music Selection Hong Kong Music Top Ten of the Year	"I don't smoke & I don't drink"	9th Place
2022	Whats Good Music Awards 2022	Most Popular Hip Hop Songs	"Christy"	Won
2022	Yahoo! Asia Multiverse Buzz Awards 2022	Top 100 most searched local male and female artists or groups	N/A	Top 38
2023	The 21st CASH Golden Sail Music Awards	Best Choral Performance	Leo Ku / Tyson Yoshi - "2nd Favourite"	Nominated
2024	2023 Social Media Chart	Person of the Year	N/A	Won
2024	Chill Club Chart Award Presentation 23/24	Chill Club Jury Commendation Award Rock Song	"你不會一輩子的愛上我"	Won

=== MV Awards and Nominations ===
Year 2022

- "If I Die Tonight"
  - Indie Short Film
- "I don't smoke and I don't drink"
  - Indie Short Film
- "Self-Made (Something pt.2)"
  - Indie Short Film
- "That Guy"
  - Cannes World Film Festival (Nominated)
  - Los Angeles Independent Film Festival Awards
  - Oniros Film Awards - New York
  - Europe Film Festival
  - World Film Camival - Singapore
  - Global Music Awards
  - Los Angeles Film Awards
  - New York International Film Awards - NYIFA

== See also ==
- Hong Kong hip hop
