= Anson Kong =

Hong Kong singer (born 1992)

- 江𤒹生
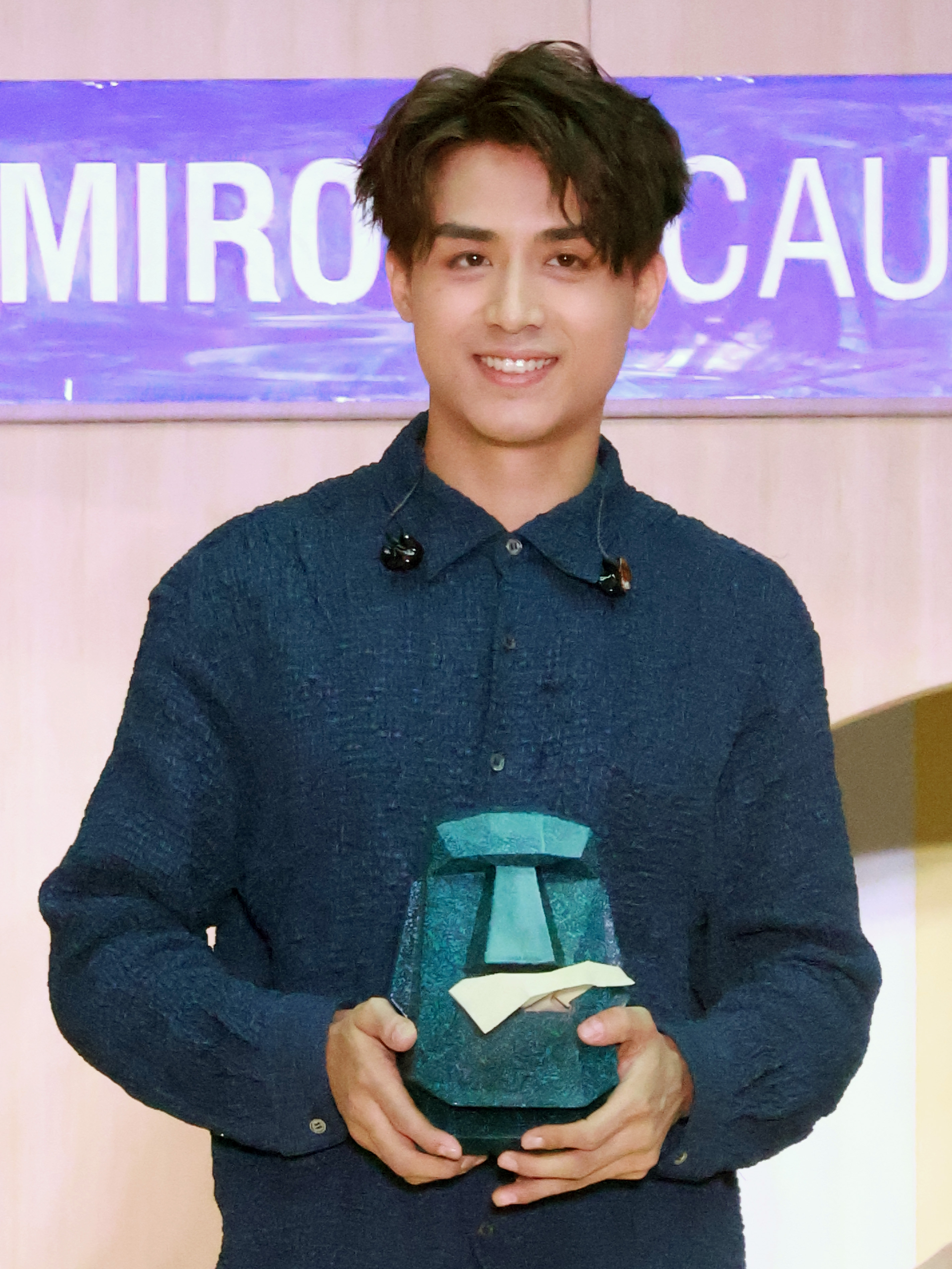
- Kong in 2023
- Born: 16 October 1992 (age 34); British Hong Kong
- Other names: AK; 畢生江; 江爆生; 爆爆; 山下一群羊; 上等靚豬兜
- Occupations: Singer; dancer; actor
- Agent: Makerville
- Height: 1.75 m (5 ft 9 in)
- Musical career
- Genres: Cantopop; dance pop
- Instruments: Vocals; guitar
- Years active: 2018–present
- Label: Music Nation
- Member of: Mirror; Jappers

Chinese name
- Chinese: 江𤒹生
Transcriptions
Standard Mandarin
- Hanyu Pinyin: Jiāng Yèshēng
- Wade–Giles: Ch'iang Yeh-sheng
Yue: Cantonese
- Jyutping: Gong^{1} Jip^{6} Sang^{1}

YouTube information
- Channel: ansonkong1016
- Years active: 2016-present
- Subscribers: 106,000
- Views: 13.1 million
- Last updated: 6 January 2023

Anson Kong Ip-sang (Chinese: 江𤒹生; born 16 October 1992), also referred to as AK, is a Hong Kong singer, dancer, actor, and a member of the Hong Kong boy group Mirror. Apart from his group activities, Anson Kong has released solo music and starred in television dramas.

== Life and career ==
Kong was born in Hong Kong on 16 October 1992. He attended SKH Li Ping Secondary School, an Anglican school in Tsuen Wan. Kong auditioned for the Chinese singing competition Super Boy in 2013, at the age of 18. Realising his passion for performing, Kong invested his free time and resources to singing and dancing, eventually winning a contract with a record label. He was sent to Seoul, South Korea to undergo training for a potential debut in a boy group. When his debut was canceled half a year later, Kong returned to Hong Kong to work as a backup dancer. As a dancer, Kong accompanied many Hong Kong singers and made television appearances as an extra, most notably in Barrack O'Karma (2018) as Selena Lee's dancing partner.

In 2018, Kong auditioned for ViuTV's reality talent competition Good Night Show - King Maker and finished fifth place, earning him a spot in the twelve-member boy group Mirror. The group debuted on 3 November 2018 with the single "In a Second" (一秒間). Kong was appointed as the band's deputy captain.

Kong made his acting debut in television drama Retire to Queen (2019) with a guest appearance in the first episode. He then starred in the martial arts drama Warriors Within (2020), co-starring Stephen Au and Hedwig Tam.

In February 2020, Kong debuted as a solo artist with his first single Intentional (特登), which peaked at number eight on the 903 Top 20 and number three on the Metro Radio Chart. In August 2020, he dropped his second single Snail (蝸牛), written by his bandmate Ian Chan. The duet version with Ian topped the Chill Club Chart. His third single Venus Girl (金星女孩) was released 14 October 2020.

His fourth solo single Black Breath (黑之呼吸), released in March 2021, peaked at number two on the 903 Top 20 and Metro Radio Chart. A teaser of a collaboration between Kong and Lokman Yeung was first released on Mirror's Instagram account, as part of their summer project. The single and music video for "Stage Door" (虎道門) was released 20 August 2021. Kong's sixth single "Three Words" was released on November 8.

Kong hosted the variety show Have a Sweet Gym, which premiered on 22 November 2021.

In 2022 Kong's seventh single "Rebound" was released on March 3. This song was a collaboration with Mirror member Alton Wong. Following after, another single Shinnomaki (信之卷) was released in May 2022. Kong's first movie appearance is in Love Suddenly (2022). Movie was released on November 17 in Hong Kong. In November 2022, Kong's first drama series as main role, Rope a Dope (繩角) was aired on ViuTV. Kong was starred as Chun Au-Yeung, who becomes a professional boxer. Kong also wrote the music for one of the theme song, Differences Between Us (我們的相差), for this drama series.

On Dec 1st, 2022, Kong arrived in Vancouver, Canada to film the 5th season of the Hong Kong idol reality show "King Maker". Kong is one of the judges for the North American audition of this show.

In addition, Kong also runs his own YouTube channel with over 100k subscribers.

== Filmography ==
=== Film ===
Year	Title	Chinese Title	Role	Notes/Ref.
2022	One Piece Film: Red	-	Red-Haired Shanks	Cantonese dub
2022	Love Suddenly	忽然心動	Chung Wong	
2023	Back Home	七月返歸	Heung-Wing	World Premiere at New York Asia Film Festival
2024	We 12	12怪盜	A.K.	
2026	We're Nothing At All	我們不是什麽	Zhuang Yiu Fai	AK joined Gala Premiere at the 50th Hong Kong International Film Festival (HKIFF) on 2 April 2026 respectively International Premiere at the 28th Far East Film Festival in Udine, Italy on 25 April 2026 & won Audience Choice Award Taipei Film Festival on 4 July 2026 West Coast Premiere at The Culver Theatre, Los Angeles on 10 Oct 2026; plus screenings & discussions at USC School of Cinematic Arts on 7 Oct and UCLA School of Theater, Film & Television on 9 Oct
2026	Spare Queens	大分瓶	Chan Tsz Chun	Gala Premiere at the 50th Hong Kong International Film Festival (HKIFF) on 9 April 2026 respectively
2026	Odium Zero	無涯之約	Ares	Voice acting

=== Television series ===
Year	Title	Chinese title	Role	Network	Notes/Ref.
2019	Retire to Queen	退休女皇	Muscular guy	ViuTV	Cameo appearance (Episode 1)
2019	Barrack O'Karma	金宵大廈	Dancer	TVB	Extra (prior to debut)
2020	Warriors Within	打天下	Chi Ho Kwan	ViuTV	Supporting role
2020	We are the Littles	男排女將	Gym instructor	ViuTV	Cameo appearance (Episode 20)
2022	Rope A Dope	繩角	Chun Au-Yeung	ViuTV	Main role
2023	Sparks	冰上火花	Wong Tin Shing	ViuTV	Main role
2024	Warriors Within 2	打天下2	Chi Ho Kwan	ViuTV	
2026	In Geek We Trust 2.0	IT狗2.0	Anson Kong (AK)	ViuTV	Cameo appearance (Episode 3)
2026	Long Vacation	悠長假期	Wong Tsz Lok (Zero Wong)		Main role

=== Variety show ===
Year	Title	Chinese title	Role	Network	Notes
2018	Good Night Show: King Maker	Good Night Show 全民造星	Contestant	ViuTV	Contestant no. 23, finished fifth place
2018	Mirror Go	—N/a	Cast member	ViuTV	with Mirror
2019	Mirror Go 2	—N/a	Cast member	ViuTV	with Mirror
2021	Battle of the Throne	擊戰	Host	ViuTV	with Kevin Lee and Yoshi Yu
2021	Know Your Ingredients	今餐有料到	Host	ViuTV	Ep 35–79
2021	Battle Feel	考有Feel	Cast member	ViuTV	with Mirror and Error
2021	Be a Better Mirror	調教你MIRROR	Cast member	ViuTV	with Mirror
2021	Have a Sweet Gym	—N/a	Host	ViuTV	
2023	Shiny Summer - MIRROR+	全星暑假 - MIRROR+	Cast member	ViuTV	with Mirror
2023–2024	MIRROR Time	—N/a	Cast member	ViuTV	with Mirror
2024	Mirror Chef	—N/a	Cast member	ViuTV	with Mirror
2026	Viuriety	8點直落Viuriety	Guest	ViuTV	Ep. 36, 46, 56
2026	MIRROR ACE	—	Cast member	ViuTV	with Mirror

=== Radio drama ===
Year	Title	Role	Notes/Ref.
2020-	Last Seen!	Sunny (張日寬)	Broadcast in Commercial Radio 903 programme "Philosomnia" at 1a.m. on Mondays

=== Drama ===
Year	Title	Chinese Title	Role	Organizer	Notes/Ref.
2025	Paradise of the Suck	Suck樂園	Paradise staff, elderly care, Anson bro, bus lover	Dharma Workshop	21 shows from 16 May to 1 Jun 2025 at HKAPA Lyric Centre
2026	The Magic Hour	魔幻時刻	Hotel Manager (方文俊）	Dharma Workshop	29 shows from 5-7, 9–14, 16-21, 23-28 Jun 2026 at HKAPA Lyric Centre

== Discography ==
=== Album ===
Year	Title	First Edition Issue Date	Versions	Category	Distributor	Song list
2025	The Trip	27 November	Deluxe edition (black); Standard edition A (blue) - Standard edition B (red)	EP	Music Nation Records Co Ltd	1. "Panic Animals"; 2. "Love is On the Way"; 3. "Fri...ends"; 4. "How to deal with Love"; 5. "Trapped"; 6. "Dead a Hundred Times"

=== Singles ===
==== As lead artist ====
Year	Title	Chinese title	Music	Lyrics	Arrangement	Producer	Notes
2020	"Intentional"	特登	Terry Chui	林寶	Terry Chui/ Hirsk	Terry Chui	
2020	"A Hundred Billions of Maybe"	千億個或許	Anson Kong	Oscar Lee	Hilson.C	Ahfa Wong/ Anson Kong	Theme song of Warriors Within
2020	"Snail"	蝸牛	Ian Chan	Riley	Terry Chui	Terry Chui	
2020	"Venus Girl"	金星女孩	Terry Chui	Oscar Lee	Terry Chui	Terry Chui	
2021	"Breath of Blackness"	黑之呼吸	Tin Hang @One Promise	Oscar Lee	Tin Hang@One Promise	Terry Chui	
2021	"The Three Words"	三個字	Tin Hang @One Promise	Oscar Lee	Tin Hang@One Promise	Terry Chui	
2022	"Shin no maki"	信之卷	Van @Nowhere Boys	Oscar Lee	Nowhere Boys	Carl Wong	
2023	"Keep Rollin'"	-	Terry Chui & Anson Kong	Oscar Lee	Jeffrey Yip	Terry Chui	
2023	"Blue Monkey"	-	Ian Chan	Oscar Lee	Jeffrey Yip	Terry Chui	
2023	"Moonlight"	月色	Takase Toya			Terry Chui	Cantonese version of "White Love"
2024	"Guilt Machine"	-	Gareth.T	Oscar Lee	Gareth.T	Terry Chui	
2024	"A Fake Trailer"	偽映畫預告	Jay Fung / Anson Kong	Oscar Lee	Nick Wong	Terry Chui	
2025	"Love is On The Way"	-	SeaTravel／Chai Shing Di／yamil／Gareth Chan	Chan Wing Him	SeaTravel	Gareth Chan	
2025	"Dead a Hundred Times"	心死了幾百次	Gareth Chan / SeaTravel／Chai Shing Di／Syamil	Chan Wing Him	SeaTravel / Nick Wong	Gareth Chan	
2025	"Fri...ends"	月月	Fung Wing Ki, Vicky	Oscar Lee	Yikin Lo	Terry Chui	
2025	"Panic Animals"	叛逆動物	Gareth Chan／SeaTravel／Chai Shing Di／Syamil	Chan Wing Him	SeaTravel	Gareth Chan	
2025	"How to Deal with Love"	愛應該怎麽辦	Anson Kong / Tin Hang @One Promise	Oscar Lee	Tin Hang @One Promise	Terry Chui	
2025	"Trapped"	鎖	Terry Chui	Oscar Lee	Patrick Yip	Terry Chui	
2026	"Hold You Tight"	攬緊處理	Gareth Chan / Anson Kong	Erin Yan	SeaTravel / Gareth Chan	Gareth Chan	
2026	"Loser Miles"	傷心萬里通	Anson Poon	Wyman Wong	Nick Wong	Gareth Chan	

==== Collaborations ====
Year	Title	Chinese title	Music	Lyrics	Arrangement	Producer	Notes
2020	"Last Seen!"	Last Seen!	Oscar Lee		Siu Tung		Theme song of radio drama Last Seen
2020	"Snail (Duet Ver.)" (with Ian Chan)	蝸牛	Ian Chan	Riley	Terry Chui	Terry Chui	
2021	"Stage Door" (with Lokman Yeung)	虎道門	Carl Wong	Oscar/ Lokman/ AK	Carl Wong	Carl Wong	
2021	"Stage Door" Acoustic version (with Lokman Yeung, Nowhere Boys)	虎道門	Carl Wong	Oscar/ Lokman/ AK	Nowhere Boys	Nowhere Boys	
2021	三十之前	三十之前	Oscar Lee		Siu Tung		Incidental song of radio drama "Last Seen"
2022	"Rebound" (with Alton Wong)	-	Carl Wong	Oscar/ Alton Wong	Carl Wong	Carl Wong	
2022	"Fight Your Corner" (with Lokman Yeung)	-	Tin Hang@One Promise	Oscar/ Lokman Yeung	Tin Hang@One Promise	Randy Chow	Theme song of Rope A Dope
2022	"Differences Between Us" (with Ashley Lin)	我們的相差	Anson Kong	Oscar	Nekothemeow/Terry Chui/Nick Wong	Terry Chui	Ending theme song of Rope A Dope
2023	"Hakuai" (with Takase Toya)	白愛	Takase Toya			Terry Chui	
2024	"FING!" (with Frankie Chan, Alton Wong, Lokman Yeung)	-	Carl Wong Sheung Chun	Oscar Rap part：Lokman／Alton	Carl Wong Sheung Chun		
2025	"DUM!" (with Frankie Chan, Alton Wong, Lokman Yeung)	-	Alex Karlsson／Alexej Viktorovitch - prod JeL	Chow Yiu-fai	Alex Karlsson／Alexej Viktorovitch - prod JeL	T-Ma	
2026	"Let's Goal" (with Ying Fa Football Club - ViuTV Football Club Women)	-	Tin Hang	Wood Tung	Tin Hang	Tin Hang	Theme song of Goal to Success 2
2026	最後一面	最後一面	Oscar Lee		Lai Ying Tong (Siu Tung)		Incidental song of radio drama Last Seen
	BRO!	-	Anson Poon / Gareth Chan	Oscar Lee	SeaTravel	Gareth Chan	

== Videography ==
=== Music videos ===
Year	Music Video	Director(s)	Co-star(s)
2020	"Intentional" (特登)	Himtos Lam	Kate Ng
2020	"Intentional" Dance Version (特登)	Himtos Lam	
2020	"A Hundred Billions of Maybe" (千億個或許)		
2020	"Snail" (蝸牛)	Himtos Lam	Shirley Shum
2020	"Snail" Duet Version (蝸牛)	Bart Pau	Ian Chan
2021	"Breath of Blackness" (黑之呼吸)	Water Chan	
2021	"Stage Door" (虎道門)	Himtos Lam, Tin Po	Lokman Yeung
2021	"Stage Door" Acoustic Ver. (虎道門)	Bart Pau	Lokman Yeung, Nowhere Boys
2021	"The Three Words" (三個字)	Maggie Leung, Sheng Wong	Leung Chung Hang, Carol To
2022	"Rebound"	Himtos Lam	Alton Wong
2022	"Shin no Maki" (信之卷)	吳啟忠, Tsui Brothers	
2023	"Keep Rollin' "	Himtos Lam	
2023	"Blue Monkey"	Himtos Lam	
2023	"Hakuai" (白愛)	Teppei Sugiura (Antilab)	Mai Koike, Nakane Sekizai, Daisuke Nomoto
2023	"Moonlight" (月色)	Endy Chan	
2024	"Guilt Machine"	Himtos Lam	Lando Wilkins (Performance Director) Ade Willis, Julien Chinchilla, Devyck Bull, Chris Munar (Dancers)
2024	"Guilt Machine" Dance Ver.	Himtos Lam	Lando Wilkins (Performance Director) Ade Willis, Julien Chinchilla, Devyck Bull, Chris Munar (Dancers)
2024	"A Fake Trailer" (偽映畫預告)	Oscar Lee	
2024	"Game of Life"	Himtos Lam, Benjamin Choi	John Chiang (rapper)
2024	"Game of Life" Dance Ver.	Himtos Lam, Benjamin Choi	
2024	"FING!"	THE11TH, Jimmy Choi	Frankie Chan, Alton Wong, Lokman Yeung
2025	"Love Is On The Way"	Himtos Lam, Benjamin Choi	Mia Fung
2025	"Love Is On The Way" Acoustic Ver.	Benjamin Choi	Tin Hang (Song Producer), Noksze, Tan, Michael (Guitarists)
2025	"Dead a Hundred Times" (心死了幾百次)	Rony Kong	Aggie C
2025	"Fri...ends" (月月)	Liknifena	Wu Lui Fung, Owen Lai, John Ho, Ethan Leung, Wong Man Chak, Kung Chi Yip
2025	"Panic Animals" (叛逆動物)	Terry To, Benjamin Choi	
2026	"Let's Goal"	ViuTV director with footage from ViuTV programme "Goal to Success 2"	Ying Fa Football Club - ViuTV Football Club Women
2026	"Hold Me Tight" (攬緊處理)	Tim Wong / Gareth Chan	Kristin Tsang
2026	"BRO!"	Dun Lamb	Frankie Chan, Alton Wong, Lokman Yeung
2026	"Loser Miles" (傷心萬里通)	Heison Ng	Day@Collar (Hui Yat)

=== Music film ===
Year	Music Film	Director(s)	Co-star(s)
2020	"Intentional" (特登)	Himtos Lam	Kate Ng

=== Cameo ===
Year	Music Video / YouTube Video	Artists
2020	蒙著嘴說愛你	Keung To 姜濤
2022	東京一轉	LaiYing Tang 麗英
2023	好好掛住	On Chan 陳建安
2025	驚奇旅明星(ep.12)	苗可麗 花花 曾莞婷 周曉涵 派翠克

== Concerts ==
=== Solo ===
Year	Date	Name	Venue	Notes/Ref.
2024	29–30 July	ANSON KONG "THE GAME OF LIFE" IN MY SIGHT SOLO CONCERT 2024	AsiaWorld–Arena	

=== Collaborations ===
Year	Date	Name	Venue	Collaborating Artist(s)
2021	7–8 Dec	MOOV LIVE Music on the Road	Hall 5BC, HKCEC	Anson Lo, Edan Lui, Ian Chan, Jer Lau, Keung To
2023	14 May	903 Music is Live Concert	AsiaWorld–Arena	Ian Chan, Panther Chan
2025	28 June	Manifest I W.T.F. Live 2025	Hall 10, AsiaWorld-Expo	Frankie Chan, Alton Wong, Lokman Yeung
2025	5 Nov	Manifest I W.T.F. 2 Live 2025	Hall 10, AsiaWorld-Expo	Frankie Chan, Alton Wong, Lokman Yeung
2026	4 April	CON-CON Hong Kong 2026 "Mix Some Music" Music Festival Day 1	AsiaWorld-Expo	Yoko Takahashi, DO AS INFINITY, Goodnight Lillie, TOGENASHI TOGEARI, Unnämed (Music Festival Day 1 Lineup)
2026	5 Sept	Manifest I W.T.F. 3 Live 2026	Studio City Event Center (Macau)	Frankie Chan, Alton Wong, Lokman Yeung
2026	31 Oct	Spooky Halloween 2026	Wanchai Harbourfront Event Space	MEOVV, Frankie Chan, Alton Wong, Lokman Yeung, VIVA, IdG Bubbles

== Awards and achievements ==
=== Music awards ===
Year (Note: Indicates the year of ceremony.)	Award	Nominee / Work	Category	Result	Ref.
2021	Chill Club Awards	"Snail (Duet Ver.)" (with Ian Chan)	Top Ten Songs of the Year	Won	
2021	Chill Club Awards	Anson Kong	Male Singer of the Year	Nominated	
2021	Chill Club Awards	Anson Kong	New Artist of the Year	Nominated	
2020	JOOX Top Music Awards	Anson Kong	Top Recommended New Singers of the Year	Won	
2021	JOOX Top Music Awards	Anson Kong	Artist Recommended by Editors	Won	
2020	Metro Radio Music Awards	Anson Kong	Best New Performer	Won	
2021	Metro Radio Music Awards	Anson Kong	Popular Idol	Won	
2022	Metro Radio Music Awards	Anson Kong	Popular Idol	Won	
2025	KKBox	Anson Kong	Singer of the Year	Won	
2026	AM1480紐約華語電台	"Dead a Hundred Times" (心死了幾百次)	Song of the Year	Won	
2026	KKBox	Anson Kong	Singer of the Year	Won	

=== Film awards ===
Year	Award	Nominee / Work	Category	Result	Ref.
2024	Asia Contents Awards & Global OTT Awards	Warriors Within 2	Rising Star of the Year	Won	
2024	Asia Contents Awards & Global OTT Awards	Warriors Within 2	Best Newcomer Actor	Nominated	
2026	Taipei Golden Horse Film Festival 2026	We're Nothing at All	Best Supporting Actor	Won	
