= The Monkey Business Tour =

2005–06 concert tour by the Black Eyed Peas

- World tour by The Black Eyed Peas
- Promotional poster for the tour
- Location: North America • Europe • Asia • Oceania • South America
- Associated album: Monkey Business
- Start date: June 3, 2005
- End date: December 29, 2006
- Legs: 4
- No. of shows: 56 in North America; 32 in Europe; 9 in Oceania; 3 in South America; 13 in Asia; 113 total

The Black Eyed Peas concert chronology
- The Monkey Business Tour (2005–06); Honda Civic Tour (2006)

The Monkey Business Tour was the second concert tour by American hip hop group the Black Eyed Peas, in support of their fourth studio album Monkey Business (2005). The concert on October 3, 2005, at the Sydney SuperDome was filmed for the official DVD release Live from Sydney to Vegas.

== Tour dates ==
List of concerts, showing date, city, country and venue
Date	City	Country	Venue	Opening act(s)
North America
June 3, 2005	Las Vegas	United States	The Joint	—N/a
June 5, 2005	Santa Barbara	United States	Santa Barbara Bowl	—N/a
June 9, 2005	New York City	United States	Apollo Theater	—N/a
June 11, 2005	Atlanta	United States	Music Midtown	—N/a
June 21, 2005	Pittsburgh	United States	Chevrolet Amphitheatre	—N/a
July 2, 2005	St. Louis	United States	Fair St. Louis	—N/a
July 3, 2005	New Orleans	United States	Essence Music Festival	—N/a
July 4, 2005	Atlantic City	United States	House of Blues	—N/a
July 7, 2005	Quebec City	Canada	Colisee de Quebec	—N/a
July 8, 2005	Ottawa	Canada	Cisco Systems Ottawa Bluesfest	—N/a
July 9, 2005	Montreal	Canada	Jarry Indoor Tennis Center	—N/a
July 10, 2005	Toronto	Canada	Molson Amphitheather	—N/a
July 11, 2005	London	Canada	John Labatt Centre	—N/a
July 15, 2005	Winnipeg	Canada	MTS Centre	—N/a
July 16, 2005	Saskatchewan	Canada	Credit Union Centre	—N/a
July 17, 2005	Edmonton	Canada	Rexall Place	—N/a
July 18, 2005	Grande Prairie	Canada	124 Games Arena	—N/a
July 19, 2005	Calgary	Canada	Pengrowth Saddledome	—N/a
July 21, 2005	Victoria	Canada	Save-on Foods Centre	—N/a
July 22, 2005	Vancouver	Canada	Deer Lake Park	—N/a
July 23, 2005	Kelowna	Canada	Prospera Place	—N/a
July 28, 2005 (Note: The concert on July 28, 2005 was originally scheduled to take place on July 5, 2005.)	Los Angeles	United States	Greek Theatre	Talib Kweli
July 29, 2005	San Diego	United States	Qualcomm Stadium at Jack Murphy Field	—N/a
July 31, 2005	New York City	United States	Randall's Island	—N/a
Asia
September 6, 2005	Dubai	United Arab Emirates	Airport Expo	—N/a
Oceania
September 23, 2005	Brisbane	Australia	Brisbane Entertainment Centre	—N/a
September 25, 2005	Melbourne	Australia	Rod Laver Arena	John Legend; Dante Santiago
September 28, 2005	Perth	Australia	Burswood Dome	John Legend; Dante Santiago
September 30, 2005	Adelaide	Australia	Adelaide Entertainment Centre	John Legend; Dante Santiago
October 2, 2005	Sydney	Australia	Sydney Entertainment Centre	John Legend; Dante Santiago
October 3, 2005	Sydney	Australia	Sydney SuperDome	John Legend; Dante Santiago
October 5, 2005	Wellington	New Zealand	Queens Wharf Events Centre	John Legend; Dante Santiago
October 6, 2005	Christchurch	New Zealand	Westpac Centre	John Legend; Dante Santiago
October 8, 2005	Auckland	New Zealand	Mt. Smart Supertop	John Legend; Dante Santiago
Latin America
November 17, 2005	San Juan	Puerto Rico	Coliseo de Puerto Rico José Miguel Agrelot	—N/a
November 18, 2005	Bogotá	Colombia	Estadio El Campín	—N/a
November 20, 2005 (Note: The concert on November 20, 2005 was part of the Caracas Pop Festival.)	Caracas	Venezuela	Estadio Olímpico	—N/a
November 22, 2005	Panama City	Panama	Figali Convention Center	—N/a
Europe
December 1, 2005	Brussels	Belgium	Vorst Nationaal	—N/a
December 2, 2005	Frankfurt	Germany	Jahrhunderthalle	—N/a
December 4, 2005	Geneva	Switzerland	Geneva Arena	—N/a
December 5, 2005	Milan	Italy	Forum	—N/a
December 6, 2005	Barcelona	Spain	Razzmatazz	—N/a
December 8, 2005	Lisbon	Portugal	Atlantic Pavilion	—N/a
December 9, 2005	Madrid	Spain	Riviera	—N/a
December 11, 2005	Munich	Germany	Zenith	—N/a
December 12, 2005	Oberhausen	Germany	KP Arena	—N/a
December 13, 2005	Hamburg	Germany	Sporthalle	—N/a
December 15, 2005	Glasgow	Scotland	Academy Glasgow	—N/a
December 16, 2005	Birmingham	England	Academy Birmingham	—N/a
December 18, 2005	London	England	Hammersmith Apollo	—N/a
December 19, 2005	London	England	Hammersmith Apollo	—N/a
December 20, 2005	Manchester	England	Carling Apollo Manchester	—N/a
December 21, 2005	Paris	France	Zenith	—N/a
Asia
June 3, 2006	Tel Aviv	Israel	Bloomfield Stadium	
Europe
June 5, 2006	Bratislava	Slovakia	Incheba Exhibition Centre Gallery of Arts	
June 7, 2006	Kyiv	Ukraine	Sports Palace	
June 10, 2006	Istanbul	Turkey	Santralistanbul	
June 12, 2006	Glasgow	Scotland	SECC	
June 13, 2006	Birmingham	England	NEC Arena	
June 14, 2006	Manchester	England	MEN Arena	
June 16, 2006	London	England	Wembley Arena	
June 17, 2006	Copenhagen	Denmark	Zulu Rock Festival	
June 18, 2006	Faro	Portugal	Algarve Festival	
June 20, 2006	Monaco	Monaco	Grimaldi Forum	
June 23, 2006	Madrid	Spain	Metro Rock Festival	
June 24, 2006	Santander	Spain	Santander Summer Festival	
June 25, 2006	Frauenfeld	Switzerland	Openair Frauenfeld	
June 28, 2006	Berlin	Germany	Adidas Arena	
June 29, 2006	Leuven	Belgium	Rock Werchter	
July 1, 2006	Montreux	Switzerland	Montreux Jazz Festival	
July 2, 2006	Rome	Italy	Cornetto Free Music Festival	
Asia
July 11, 2006	Osaka	Japan	Osaka-Jo Hall	
July 13, 2006	Tokyo	Japan	Budokan Hall	
July 14, 2006	Tokyo	Japan	Budokan Hall	
July 16, 2006	Hong Kong	China	AsiaWorld Arena	
July 18, 2006	Beijing	China	Expo Theater	
July 20, 2006	Shanghai	China	Shanghai Indoor Stadium	
Europe
July 22, 2006	Moscow	Russia	Red Summer Festival	
Asia
July 25, 2006	Taipei	Taiwan	Taipei Soccer Stadium	
July 27, 2006	Quezon City	Philippines	Araneta Coliseum	
July 31, 2006	Bangkok	Thailand	Impact Arena	
August 2, 2006	Mumbai	India	MMRDA Grounds	
August 3, 2006	Bengaluru	India	The Palace Grounds	
North America
August 14, 2006	Honolulu	United States	Neal S. Blaisdell Center	
August 24, 2006	Mansfield	United States	Comcast Center	
August 25, 2006	Wantagh	United States	Nikon at Jones Beach Theater	
August 26, 2006	Saratoga Springs	United States	Saratoga Performing Arts Center	
August 27, 2006	Syracuse	United States	New York State Fair	
August 29, 2006	Holmdel	United States	PNC Bank Arts Center	
August 30, 2006	Allentown	United States	Great Allentown Fair	
September 1, 2006	Atlantic City	United States	Borgata	
September 3, 2006	Charlottetown	Canada	CDP Entertainment Centre	
September 4, 2006	Mount Pearl	Canada	Pearlgate Concert Grounds	
September 5, 2006	Portland	United States	Cumberland County Civic Center	
September 6, 2006	Corfu	United States	Darien Lake PAC	
September 8, 2006	Glendale	United States	Cardinals Stadium	
September 12, 2006	Montreal	Canada	Bell Centre	
September 13, 2006	Ottawa	Canada	Scotiabank Place	
September 14, 2006	Uncasville	United States	Mohegan Sun Arena	
September 16, 2006	Farmington	United States	Neamcolin Woodland Resort	
September 23, 2006	Chicago	United States	Charter One Pavilion	
September 26, 2006	Rapid City	United States	Rushmore Plaza Civic Center	
September 27, 2006	Cedar Rapids	United States	U.S. Cellular Center	
September 29, 2006	Grand Forks	United States	Alerus Center	
September 30, 2006	Winnipeg	Canada	MTS Centre	
October 2, 2006	Regina	Canada	Brandt Centre	
October 3, 2006	Calgary	Canada	Pengrowth Saddledome	
October 4, 2006	Edmonton	Canada	Rexall Place	
October 6, 2006	Vancouver	Canada	Pacific Coliseum	
October 7, 2006	Victoria	Canada	Save-On-Foods Memorial Centre	
November 30, 2006	Bakersfield	United States	Rabobank Arena Theater	
December 1, 2006	Los Angeles	United States	Staples Center	
December 29, 2006	Paradise	United States	Mandalay Bay	
