= Moov =

Hong Kong-based music streaming website

- Developer: PCCW Ltd.
- Launched: April 24, 2006; 20 years ago
- Platforms: Android, iOS, Web app AAC, FLAC
- Availability: Hong Kong; Mainland China; Vietnam
- Website: moov.hk

Moov (stylized as MOOV) is a subscription-based music, podcast and video streaming service that combines lossless audio and high-definition music videos with exclusive content and special features on music. Moov was launched in 2006 by Hong Kong public company PCCW.

The service has over 1.5 million tracks in lossless FLAC-based 16-Bit/44.1 kHz quality. It has distribution agreements with close to 300 labels and content providers including EMI, Gold Typhoon and Sony Music. Moov is currently available in Hong Kong, Vietnam and Mainland China.

The platform is integrated with other PCCW products and services. Music contents are shared with HKT eye, a fixed network service. Video contents such as concerts and music videos are shared with Now TV, a subscription-based television network.

== Development ==
After launching Moov in Hong Kong in 2006, the company began to expand its service overseas. In 2013, PCCW partners SMC, China Telecom and BestTV to expand the music streaming service to Mainland China with the brand "摩音符 Moov". Moov became the first subscription-based music streaming service from outside of Mainland China to operate in China. In 2016, Moov extends its streaming service to Vietnam by partnering with Vietnamobile and through signing deals with over 150 content providers in Vietnam.

In 2014, Moov launches the LyricSnap! feature that allows users share music and lyric on social media platforms.

In 2015, Moov has started to support Apple Watch and launches its lossless FLAC-based 16-Bit/44.1 kHz audio streaming service.

In 2016, Moov launches the Therapeutic Music library with Cantonese audio inductions. The library contain playlists created by registered professional music therapists from around the world including the United States, Canada and Australia, targeting different needs such as stress reduction, pregnancy soothing and sleep improvement. Moov claims it to be "Asia's first and only Therapeutic Music Library".

== See also ==
- Comparison of on-demand music streaming services
- List of Internet radio stations
- List of online music databases
- KKBox
- JOOX
