= AsiaWorld–Arena =

Venue in Chek Lap Kok, Hong Kong

Coordinates: 22°19′17″N 113°56′38″E

- 亞洲國際博覽館 Arena
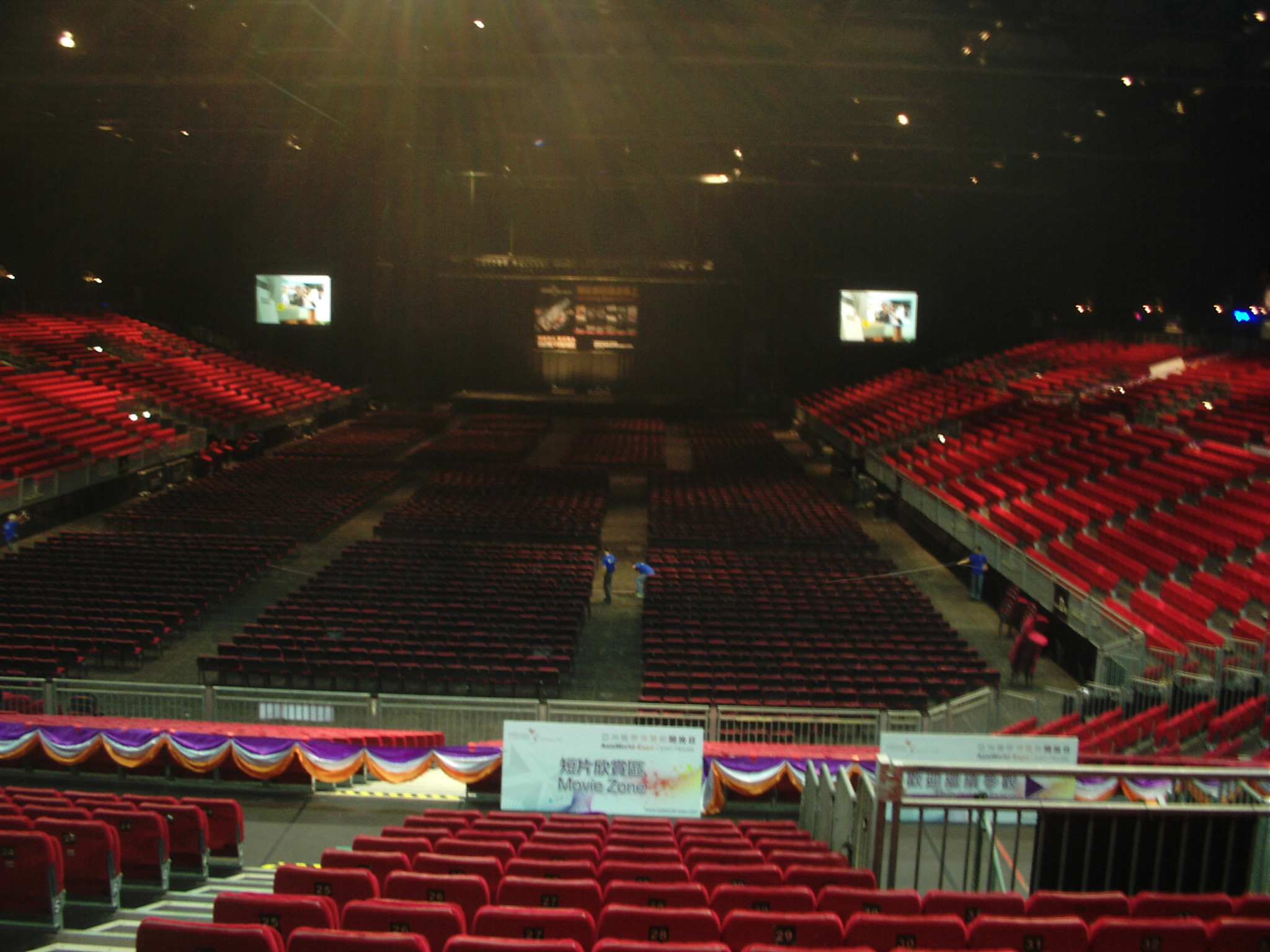
- Interior view in 2010
- Interactive map of AsiaWorld–Arena
- Address: Level 1, AsiaWorld-Expo; Chek Lap Kok, Lantau Island; Hong Kong
- Location: AsiaWorld–Expo
- Owner: Hong Kong SAR Government
- Operator: AsiaWorld-Expo Management Limited
- Capacity: 12,500 (seated); 14,000 (with standing)

Construction
- Built: 2004–2005
- Opened: 21 December 2005

Website
- Venue Info

AsiaWorld–Arena
- Traditional Chinese: 亞洲國際博覽館 Arena
- Simplified Chinese: 亚洲国际博览馆 Arena
Transcriptions
Standard Mandarin
- Hanyu Pinyin: Yàzhōu Guójì Bólǎnguǎn Arena
Yue: Cantonese
- Jyutping: aa3 zau1 gwok3 zai3 bok3 laam5 gun2 Arena

AsiaWorld–Arena (Chinese: 亞洲國際博覽館 Arena, also Hall 1 of AsiaWorld–Expo) is the largest indoor seated performance venue in Hong Kong. It has a total floor area of 10,880 square metres (117,100 square feet), a maximum capacity of 12,500 seats (14,000 with standing) and high ceiling clearance of 19 metres. It is located next to the Hong Kong International Airport. It plays host to many concerts, sporting events, and other forms of entertainment.

== Entertainment ==
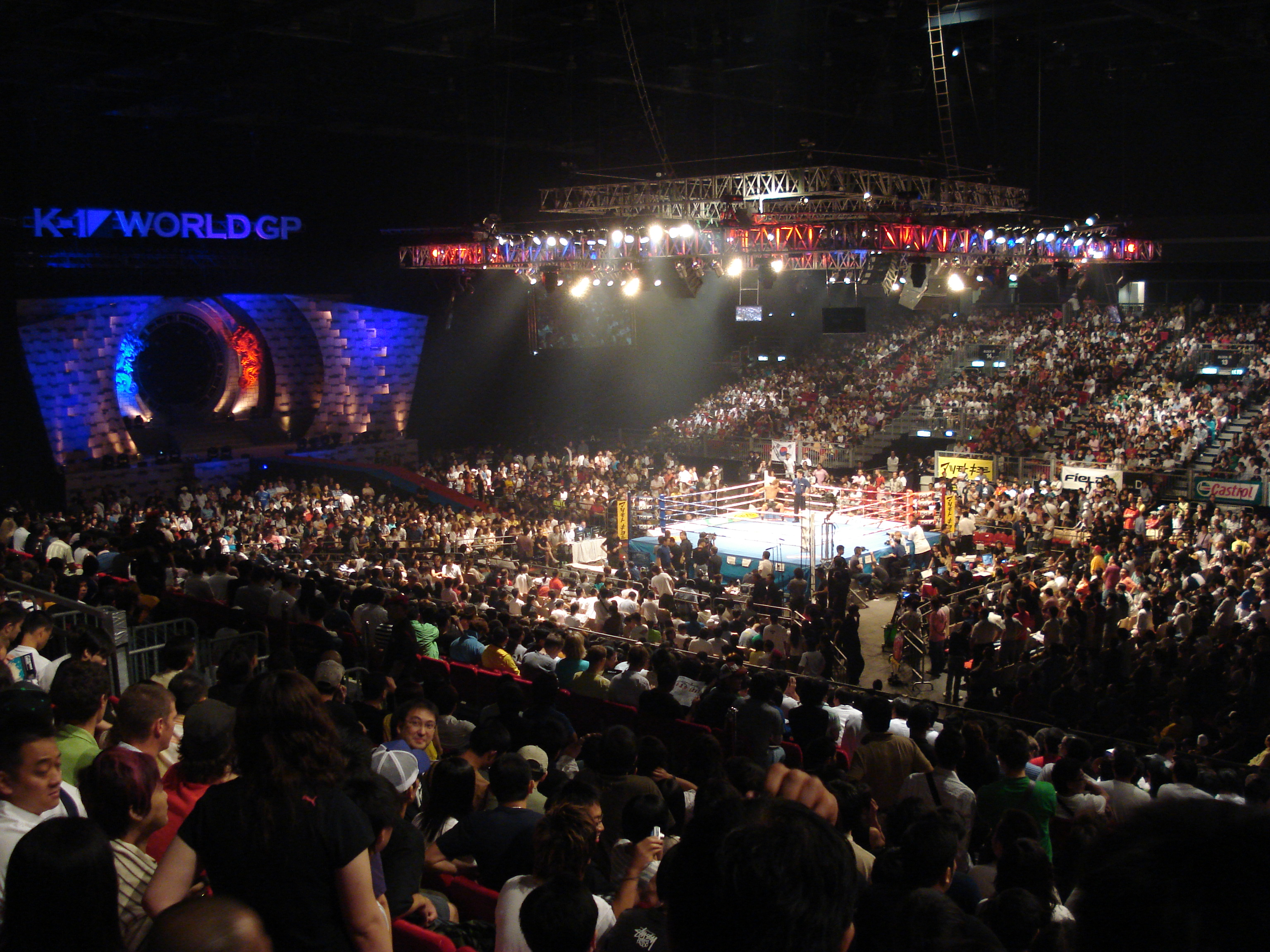
K-1 World Grand Prix at AsiaWorld–Arena.

AsiaWorld–Arena has been the busiest indoor venue in Hong Kong since its opening on 21 December 2005; with many local, regional and international artists have performed here spanning a wide range of musical genres.

== Other events ==
The Arena has also played host to the 10th Anniversary Celebration Gala of Phoenix Satellite Television and the Miss Chinese Cosmos Pageant, as well as sports competitions like the K-1 World Grand Prix 2007 and the 2008 Hong Kong IDSF Asian Pacific DanceSport Championships.

It played host to Walking with Dinosaurs – The Arena Spectacular from 22 December 2010 to 2 January 2011. On 18 March 2015, the arena hosted One Direction on their On the Road Again Tour. This concert would ultimately be the final performance with Zayn Malik as a member before his departure from the group six days later. It would also be the final ever performance of the group as a quintet due to the death of Liam Payne in October 2024.

On 2-7 May 2012, Lady Gaga performed at the arena for 4 sold-out nights for her Born This Way Ball

On 17–18 February 2016, Queen of Pop Madonna headlined the arena for 2 sold-out nights. Miss International Organization confirms that Hong Kong will be the host country of Miss International 2017. Ariana Grande performed at the venue on 21 September 2017 part of the final show of the Dangerous Woman Tour.

Regional artists who have performed at the arena include Aaron Kwok, Andy Lau, Faye Wong, George Lam, Hins Cheung, Jacky Cheung, Jay Chou, Joker Xue, Karen Mok, Miriam Yeung, Mirror, and many others. Numerous K-pop artists have performed at the venue, including 2NE1, Aespa, Babymonster, BigBang, Blackpink, BTS, Exo, G-Dragon, (G)I-dle, Girls' Generation, Itzy, IU, Seventeen, Shinee, Stray Kids, Super Junior, TVXQ, and many others.
