= MM730 - Fans Club Welfare Department =

Hong Kong TV show

- Original language: Cantonese

Production
- Running time: 30 minutes

Original release
- Network: ViuTV
- Release: April 5, 2022 – November 14, 2023

MM730 - Fans Club Welfare Department (Chinese: 粉絲福利署) is a Hong Kong interactive music talk show on ViuTV. Fans are invited to meet their favourite singers, play games and listen songs. It airs at 7:30pm every Tuesday on ViuTV (Ch.99).

== 2022 ==
List of Episodes (2022)

Episode	Air Date	Guest
1	5 April	ToNick
2	12 April	Jace Chan
3	19 April	Jay Fung
4	26 April	Alfred Hui
5	3 May	Mansonvibes
6	10 May	ONE PROMISE
7	17 May	Sherman Chung
8	24 May	Jason Chan
9	31 May	P1X3L
10	7 June	per se
11	14 June	Endy Chow
12	21 June	Cath Wong
13	28 June	C AllStar's On Chan
14	5 July	Aka Chio (former member of Super Girls)
15	12 July	Zeno Koo
16	19 July	Mischa Ip
17	26 July	Kolor
18	2 August	Ansonbean
19	9 August	Mr.'s Alan Po
20	16 August	Yellow!
21	23 August	TomFatKi
22	30 August	C AllStar's Andy Leung
23	6 September	Kira Chan (former member of As One)
24	13 September	Terence Siufay
25	20 September	ILUB
26	27 September	Vincy Chan
27	4 October	Ying Chi Yuet
28	11 October	Tang Siu Hau
29	18 October	Stephanie Cheng
30	25 November	Rock Hill Street
31	1 November	Cloud Wan
32	8 November	Kay Tse
33	15 November	Pandora
34	29 November	Desmond Yu (DEZ)
35	13 December	Lai Ying
36	20 December	Aiden Hung
37	20 December	Mag Lam
38	27 December	Robynn Yip

== 2023 ==
Episode	Air Date	Guest	Notes
39	3 January	Jaime Cheung	
40	10 January	Sabrina Cheung	
41	17 January	Angela Pang	
42	24 January	FINALLY	
43	31 January	Joyce Cheng	
44	7 February	Mike Tsang	
45	14 February	Kerryta Chau	
46	21 February	Chase Chan	
47	28 February	SENZA A Cappella	
48	7 March	Zpecial	
49	14 March	Mishy Lee	
50	21 March	Michael C, Paula Au	
51	28 March	Mike Tsang, Kira Chan, Desmond Yu, Rock Hill Street, JNYBeatz	Leslie Cheung Memorial
52	4 April	Mike Tsang, Kira Chan, Desmond Yu, Rock Hill Street, JNYBeatz	Leslie Cheung Memorial
53	11 April	Mike Tsang, Kira Chan, Desmond Yu, Rock Hill Street, JNYBeatz	Leslie Cheung Memorial
54	18 April	Wilson Ng	
55	25 April	Nowhere Boys	
56	2 May	Yan Ting Chau	
57	9 May	Dark Wong	
58	16 May	Phil Lam	
59	23 May	Lagchun	
60	30 May	Goodnight, Lillie / Sinnie Ng	
61	6 June	Poki Ng	
62	13 June	J.Arie	
63	20 June	Vivian Chan	
64	27 June	Dorothy Lau	
65	4 July	Gladys Li	
66	11 July	Daniel Chan	
67	18 July	Kendy Suen	
68	25 July	Madboii	
69	2 August	FIESTER	
70	9 August	Mike P.	
71	16 August	Lil' Ashes	
72	23 August	Joey Tang, Manson Cheung, 3Think	About Beyond
73	30 August	Joey Tang, Manson Cheung, 3Think	About Beyond
74	5 September	Otome Syndream	
75	12 September	R.O.O.T	
76	19 September	Charming Way	
77	26 September	Gin Lee	
78	3 October	Jamie Zhang	
79	10 October	Chan Chun Hang & HEi-Z	King Maker V finalists
80	17 October	Chan Chun Hang & HEi-Z	King Maker V finalists
81	24 October	N9	
82	31 October	The Absent Brother	
83	7 November	Gigi Cheung	
84	14 November	Sica Ho	
