= King Maker VI =

Hong Kong reality TV show

- Genre: Reality competition
- Opening theme: 前傳
- Original languages: Cantonese, English
- No. of episodes: 41

Production
- Running time: 60 minutes

Original release
- Network: ViuTV
- Release: October 27 – December 19, 2025; Final Competition: January 4, 2026

Related
- Good Night Show - King Maker, King Maker II, King Maker III, King Maker IV, King Maker V

King Maker VI (Chinese: 全民造星VI) is a 2025 Hong Kong survival reality show on ViuTV as the sixth season of the King Maker series, accepting only male contestants. It premiered on October 27, 2025.

Teller Wong was the champion, Ian Hannz was the first runner-up and Jacky Fan was the second runner-up.
