= Blossoms Under Somewhere =

2024 Hong Kong film by Riley Yip

- Theatrical release poster
- Traditional Chinese: 寄了一整個春天
- Jyutping: Gei^{3} Liu^{5} Jat^{1} Zing^{2} Go^{3} Ceon^{1} Tin^{1}
- Directed by: Riley Yip
- Written by: Riley Yip; Sze Ling-ling
- Produced by: Fruit Chan
- Starring: Marife Yau; Sheena Chan
- Cinematography: Rick Lau
- Edited by: Lee Him-ming
- Music by: Sara Fung
- Production company: The Wonder Film Production
- Distributed by: mm2 Entertainment
- Release dates: 18 October 2024 (HKAFF); 21 November 2024 (Hong Kong)
- Running time: 97 minutes
- Country: Hong Kong
- Language: Cantonese

Blossoms Under Somewhere (Chinese: 寄了一整個春天) is a 2024 Hong Kong drama film directed and co-written by Riley Yip, marking her directorial debut as part of the First Feature Film Initiative, and produced by Fruit Chan. Starring Marife Yau and Sheena Chan as a pair of schoolgirls, the film explores their experiences while selling lingerie they have worn online and the unexpected attention they attracted.

After initially leaving the film industry following her work on Weeds on Fire (2016), screenwriter Riley Yip developed the screenplay in 2019 and was subsequently selected for the First Feature Film Initiative in 2020. Pre-production commenced during the COVID-19 pandemic and principal photography took place in 2023, primarily at the Ebenezer School & Home for the Visually Impaired. The film also features two theme songs performed by Marife Yau.

The film had its world premiere as the opening film of the 21st Hong Kong Asian Film Festival on 18 October 2024, followed by a theatrical release in Hong Kong on 21 November. It received two nominations in the 43rd Hong Kong Film Awards.

== Plot ==
Ching, a secondary school girl who struggles with stuttering, begins selling the lingerie she wears online for extra pocket money, encouraged by her best friend, Rachel. As she attracts a group of regular patrons, Ching enjoys their compliments and starts chatting with them regularly. Following Rachel's suggestion, they decide to expand their business by creating a fake account posing as a flight attendant, realizing that such pants can fetch several thousand dollars online. Several patrons also request face-to-face transactions. However, during her first meeting, Ching gets her menstruation and tries to cancel. The patron pressures her to proceed, insisting on buying the stained pants, and her stuttering prevents her from saying no. Although the patron pays her an extra thousand dollars, the experience frightens Ching and exacerbates her anxiety about stuttering.

Ching grows closer to another patron, finding their conversations enlightening and his social media photos appealing. She discovers his real identity as Gabriel Lau, a university physics professor, and begins skipping classes to attend his lectures. She is increasingly attracted to him, especially by his humorous teaching style, but soon learns he is married. Despite this, Lau continues to suggest face-to-face meetings while chatting online. After discussing it with Rachel, Ching agrees to meet him, but her concerns about her stuttering resurface before the transaction. Eventually, she asks Rachel to meet Lau in her place while she observes from a distance. The meetup goes well, and Lau exchanges contact information with Rachel. They start chatting frequently and meet up to trade lingerie. After witnessing Lau treat Rachel to lunch at a hotel, Ching feels jealous. She bakes a cake and tries to find Lau at university but fails to present herself again. Lau awkwardly accepts her cake but quickly tries to leave, finding her strange. In an impulsive move, Ching pulls out her worn lingerie and attempts to gift them to Lau, triggering Lau and causing him to throw both the cake and the pants to the ground in rage.

Hurt by his reaction, Ching seeks revenge by posting photos of Lau and Rachel's meetups along with their conversation records about selling lingerie on an online forum. The post sparks backlash, revealing Lau's personal information and severely damaging his reputation. Lau desperately calls Rachel, asking why she betrays him, but she has just realized she has been victimized as well. She confronts Ching, leading to the end of their friendship. In retaliation, Lau prints Rachel's photos with defamatory slogans and displays them near her school. The next morning, the school notices the incident and gathers all students in the hall, with the discipline master demanding to check everyone's schoolbags to identify those involved. Due to Ching's stuttering, classmates exploit her inability to refuse and hide their lingerie in forbidden colours or patterns in her bag. The search produces no results, but the discipline master recognizes Rachel and confronts her. In a moment of distraction, Ching rushes out of the hall and throws her schoolbag full of pants onto the playground, laughing and reconciling with Rachel.

== Cast ==
- Marife Yau as Ching, a high-achieving school girl from a prestigious secondary school who struggles with stuttering
- Sheena Chan as Rachel, Ching's best friend who sells lingeries with her
- Shin Cheung as Ben, a delivery boy acquainted with Ching
- Adam Pak as Gabriel Lau, a university professor and a patron of Ching
- Paisley Wu as Lady Snape, the discipline master of Ching and Rachel's school

Also featuring cameo appearances by George Au as Ben's delivery colleague; and producer Fruit Chan as one of Ching's patrons.

== Production ==
=== Development ===
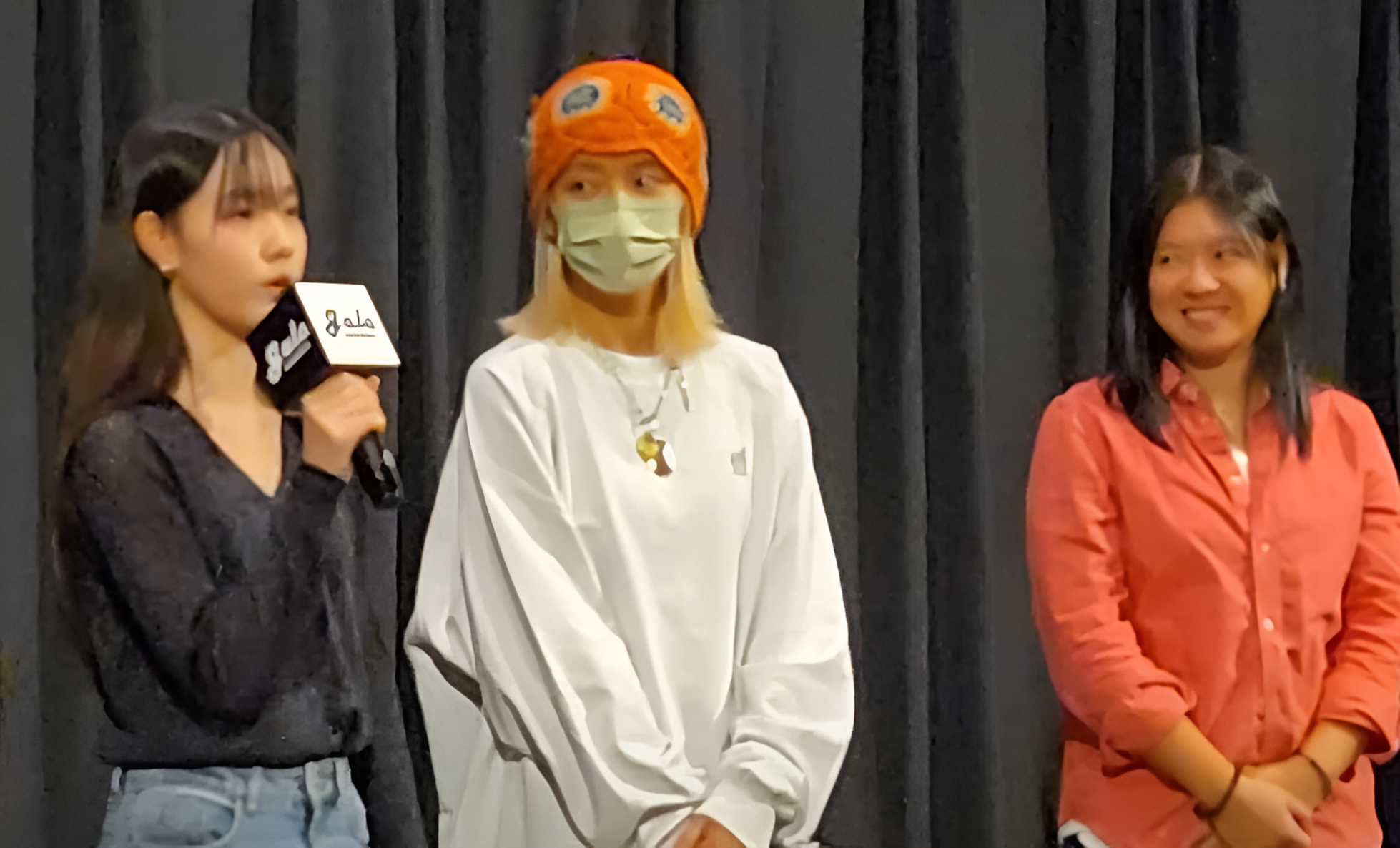
Sheena Chan (left), Marife Yau, and Riley Yip at an early screening at Langham Place in November 2024

After co-writing Weeds on Fire (2016), screenwriter Riley Yip initially decided to leave the film industry to study aviation in Adelaide and pursue a career as a pilot. While awaiting her pilot examination results, she learned that the First Feature Film Initiative had increased its budget and winner quotas, and producer Steve Chan encouraged her to join the project. She began developing the screenplay in 2019, aiming to create a story about stuttering inspired by Yukio Mishima's 1956 novel The Temple of the Golden Pavilion. In the original script, both protagonists were physically disabled, one with a stutter and the other with dyslexia, but Yip found it challenging to portray their communication and subsequently changed their character settings. The film won the Initiative under the working title The Wonder and was selected as part of the sixth wave in 2020. After winning the Initiative, Yip refined the screenplay with producer Fruit Chan during the COVID-19 pandemic, changing the ending from tragic to comedic in order to create a "lighter and more energetic" film that contrasted with the prevailing social atmosphere. To conduct field research, she joined Telegram groups selling second-hand lingeries while disguising herself as a patron.

Due to the controversial subject matter of selling used lingeries, Yip described the film as focusing on "a business surrounding subculture" while advertising for the auditions. Casting lasted two months, during which some participants dropped out upon learning the film's true context. After struggling to find an actress for Rachel, Yip approached Sheena Chan after her friend showed her a music video of a Taiwanese singer featuring Chan. Chan was unaware that selling worn lingerie online is an actual business prior to the project. The film marks the feature film debuts of girl group Collar member Marife Yau, Sheena Chan, Shin Cheung, and singer Paisley Wu; with Yau, Chan, and Cheung having previously collaborated in the ViuTV thriller series Left On Read (2023). To prepare for her role as a girl who stutters, Yau watched documentaries, communicated from real stammerers, and trained with a speech therapist, where she had to learn how to speak with a stutter.

=== Filming and post-production ===
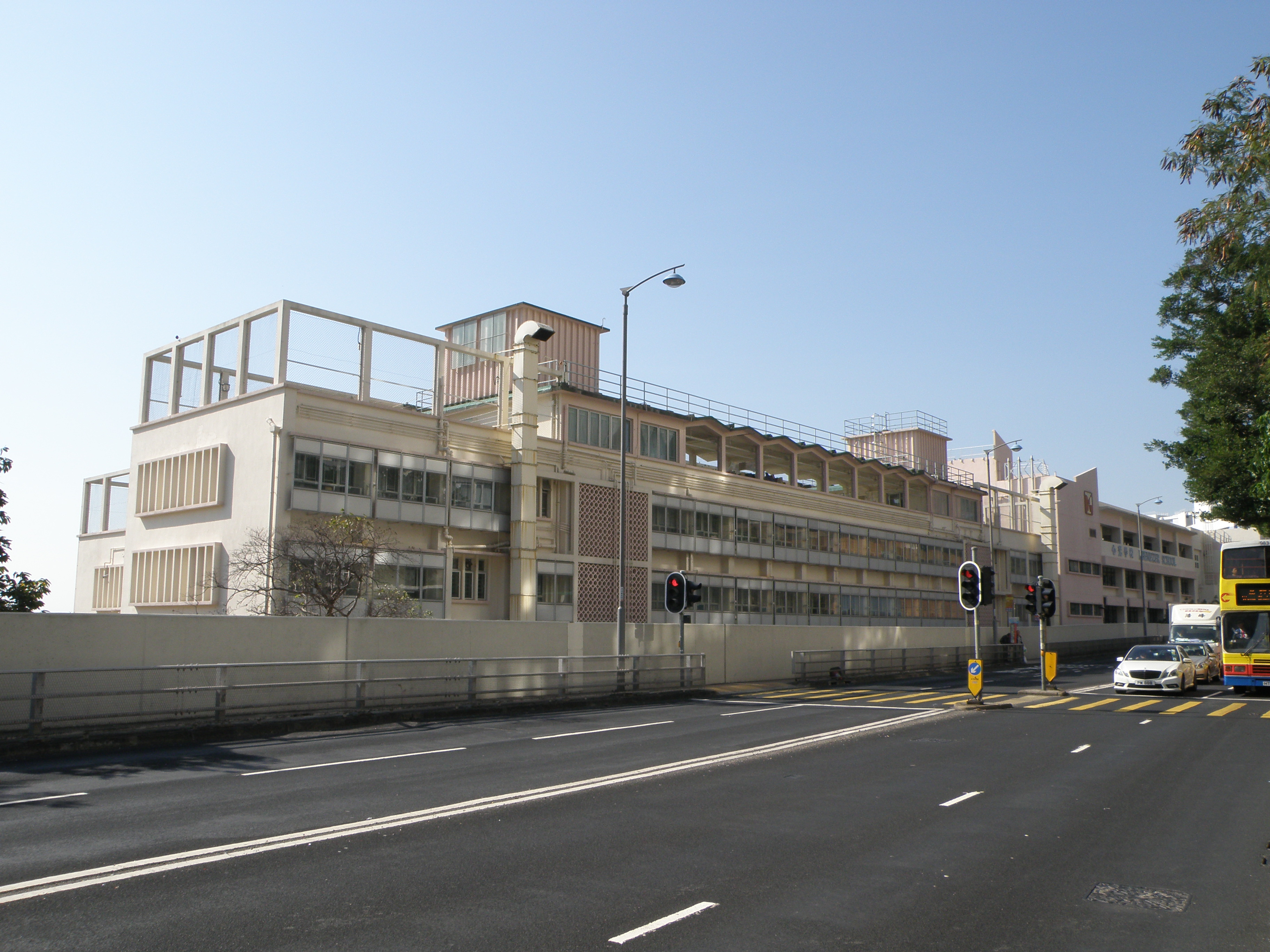
The school scenes were filmed at the Ebenezer School & Home for the Visually Impaired

Principal photography began in late March 2023, shortly after the controversial release of the schoolgirl-themed documentary To My Nineteen-Year-Old Self (2022), leading the school that had initially leased its campus to the crew to withdraw permission on the second day of filming due to the controversy. (Note: The documentary film To My Nineteen-Year-Old Self focuses on six schoolgirls, documenting both their secondary school and personal lives. It was theatrically released in February 2023 without the consent of the interviewees, leading to significant online backlash and criticism, especially after the film was awarded Best Film in the 41st Hong Kong Film Awards.) On the fifth day, the crew also lost the apartment used as the set for Ching's home as the entire building changed ownership, and the new landlord refused to allow filming. The crew found a substitute location at the Ebenezer School & Home for the Visually Impaired for the school scenes on the seventh day, but since the facilities were designed for visually impaired students, the hall and playground scenes were shot at Ying Wa Girls' School and a gymnasium instead.

Yip initially opposed filming close-up shots of the lingerie, but she proceeded at the advice of Fruit Chan and later found that footage very useful during post-production editing. The film's title was changed to Blossoms Under Somewhere after production was completed, as Yip had originally envisioned it as an art-house film but found the tone to be "not as dramatic" after filming wrapped, prompting a title change following discussions with Chan. In May 2024, the film was presented at the Marche du Film, and mm2 Entertainment acquired worldwide distribution rights that same month. In October, it was also presented at the Asian Contents & Film Market.

=== Music ===
Blossoms Under Somewhere was scored by Sara Fung. Its theme song, "Laki Kaki", was composed by Fung, with lyrics by Yvette Wong and Chow Yiu-fai, and performed by Marife Yau. It also featured an interlude titled "Something About You", co-performed by Yau and Sheena Chan.

== Release ==
Blossoms Under Somewhere had its world premiere as the opening film of the 21st Hong Kong Asian Film Festival on 18 October 2024, and was screened in competition for the NETPAC Award at the 2024 Golden Horse Film Festival. The film premiered at Causeway Bay, Hong Kong on 14 November, and was theatrically released in Hong Kong on 21 November. A four-day limited theatrical run was held in Malaysia by mm2 Entertainment starting 20 March 2025.

== Reception ==
=== Box office ===
Blossoms Under Somewhere debuted with a gross of less than HK$100,000 on its opening day, and accumulated HK$597,000 by the sixth day, with HK01 described the figures as "so-so". Due to its unsatisfactory commercial performance, cinemas began to reduce showings of the film starting in its second week of release.

=== Critical response ===
Edmund Lee of the South China Morning Post gave the film 2.5/5 stars, describing it as "a fairly unrealistic tale of misguided youth" through its "perilous undertaking for young girls", and criticizing the writers for failing to fully utilize the "juicy premise", as well as calling the third act "contrived and out of character and remains largely unresolved", although he acknowledged Marife Yau's "charismatic performance" in her debut role, which he felt was "lessened by a story this lightweight and inconsequential". Lee also ranked the film 25th out of the 36 Hong Kong films theatrically released in 2024. Alan Chu of United Daily News found the film to be a "clichéd commercial comedy" that "lacks sufficient critique or social commentary", making it "feel like just another typical Hong Kong coming-of-age film that tries to be popular and easy to enjoy, but fails to effectively convey its main themes".

Calvin Choi, reviewing for my903.com, argued that while the film can "serve an educational purpose by promoting proper awareness" and is "worth seeing" for Sheena Chan's performance alone, Blossoms Under Somewhere "did not handle the problems in its narrative properly", particularly criticizing the protagonist Ching's "absolutely selfish" personality and noting that the story concludes in "a naive and contrived manner", suggesting that "the creators were incapable of wrapping things up". Ho Tak of Harper's Bazaar also offered a critical review and noted that although the theme is "unique", the story did not "adequately explain the hardships faced by the protagonist", and "omitted some details viewers might expect or find important", such as Ching's family background and Adam Pak's "one-dimensional" character, concluding that the film "failed to fully satisfy audience curiosity about character development and the ending, which is somewhat regrettable".

Amy Mullins of China Daily described the film as a "a surprisingly assured and astute debut", noting that "[f]ew Hong Kong films about young women have given them the kind of agency Yip and co-writer Sze Ling-ling do", and called it "a delicately feminist coming-of-age story". Keith Ho, writing for HK01, also commended the film's "unique approach to exploring young girls' minds" and "the standout performances of the rising young actors", but noted that the film "did not fully utilize the 'two disabled girls' setting", resulting in "an open ending that even if not entirely chaotic, might not be accepted by all viewers".

== Awards and nominations ==
Year	Award	Category	Nominee	Result	Ref.
2024	2024 Golden Horse Film Festival	NETPAC Award	—N/a	Nominated	
2025	43rd Hong Kong Film Awards	Best New Performer	Marife Yau	Nominated	
2025	43rd Hong Kong Film Awards	Best Original Film Song	"Laki Kaki"	Nominated	
