= Win Win Yeung =

Hong Kong singer and presenter (born 1996)

WinWin Yeung
- 楊安妮
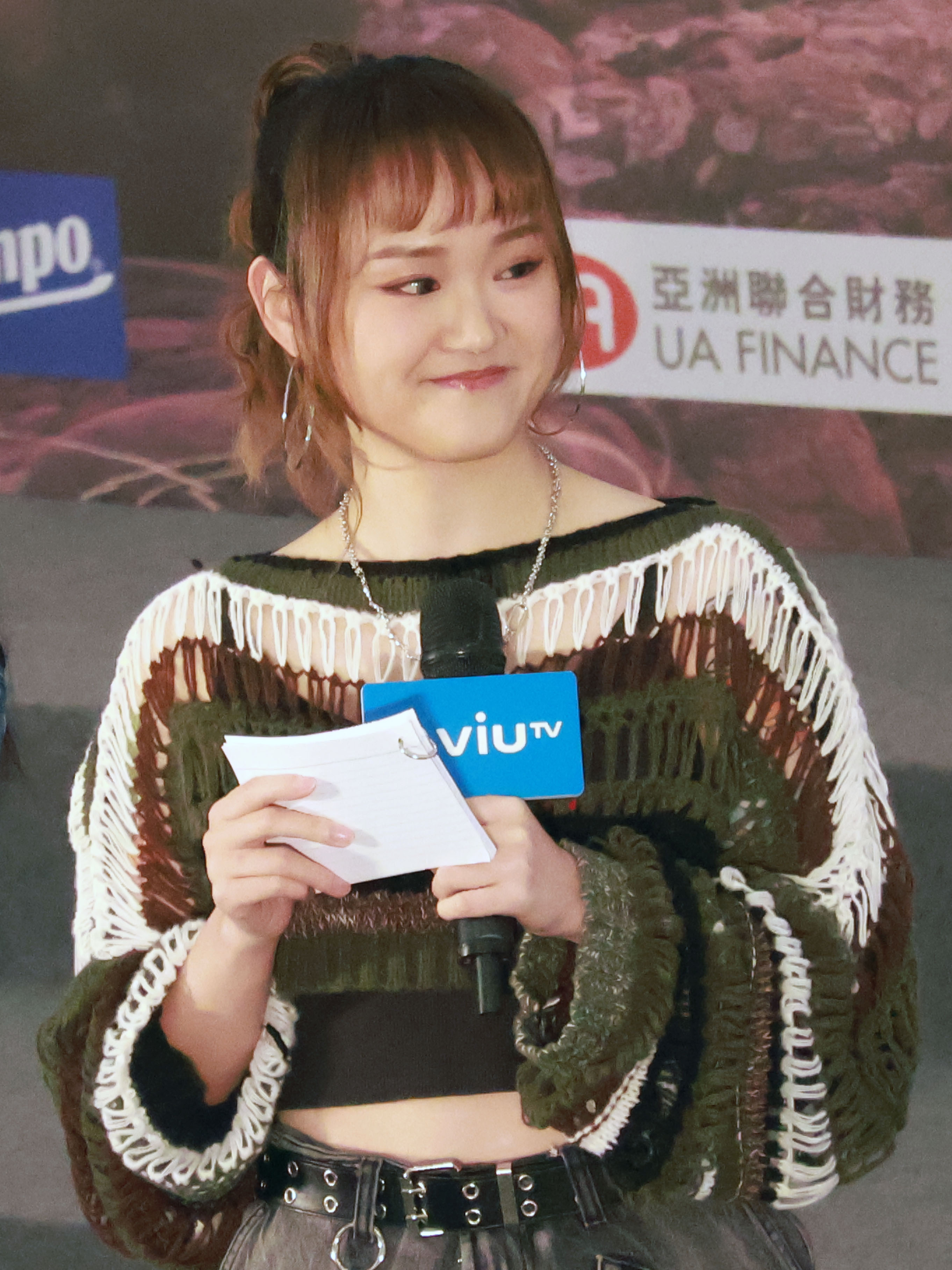
- Yeung in 2023
- Born: Yeung On Ni; 8 May 1996 (age 30); British Hong Kong
- Occupations: Artist; singer; choreographer; dance teacher
- Agent: HKTVE/MakerVille
- Height: 1.62 m (5 ft 4 in)
- Musical career
- Years active: 2021–present

WinWin Yeung On-ni (Chinese: 楊安妮; born 8 May 1996), known professionally as WinWin, is a Hong Kong singer, presenter, choreographer and dance teacher.

== Biography ==
Yeung was a dance teacher and backup dancer of concerts before participating in ViuTV reality talent contest programme King Maker IV. She got 5th place on the show. She had an offer to be a member of girl group Collar but she rejected it. She thought she did not fit the standard to be a girl group member, and she wanted to go back to being a dance teacher. Her friend suggested that she try different things other than dancing. She changed her mind. She wanted to appear on TV and perform on stage in order to introduce dancing to more people. Later, she received a phone call from MakerVille about a contract. She did not believe she had a second chance. She signed to MakerVille to film programmes for ViuTV. She is also a choreographer for groups such as P1X3L, Collar and Lolly Talk. Singer Alfred Hui invited her to participate in a dance pop song called "Masquerade" (2022). In 2023, she is the only host of TV show Pay Less, Play More about travelling to Japan.

== Discography ==
=== Singles ===
Title	Original Title	Year
"Sensei"	—N/a	2023
"Throw Away"	—N/a	2023

==== Collaborations ====
Title	Chinese Title	Year
"Masquerade" (with Alfred Hui)	假面具	2022

== Filmography ==
=== Drama ===
Title	Chinese title	Year	Role	Network	Notes/Ref.
The Money Game	飛黃騰達	TBA		ViuTV	

=== Variety show ===
Title	Chinese title	Year	Role	Network	Notes
King Maker IV	全民造星IV	2021	Contestant	ViuTV	
MM730 - Beast Fight Game	MM730 - 困獸鬥	2022	Host	ViuTV	
MM730 - Share Hall	MM730 - 男女自然觀察學會	2022	Host	ViuTV	
Know Your Ingredients	今餐有料到	2022	Host	ViuTV	
STEM Elite	STEM精讀班	2022	Host	ViuTV	
Unhumble Cooking	嘥料	2022	Host	ViuTV	
Soccer Fun	波係咁踢	2022	Host	ViuTV	
Pay less, Play more	日本winwin企画	2023	Host	ViuTV	
King Maker V Final	全民造星V 總決賽	2023	Performer	ViuTV	Performed with contestant KC
Shiny Summer - P1X3L 5G Team Up	P1X3L 5G上台計劃	2023	Host	ViuTV	

== Videography ==
=== Music videos ===
Year	Title	Artist(s)	Director(s)	Choreographer(s)
2021	Prequel	King Maker IV Contestants	Endy Chan	Ali, Pang2, Yiu
2022	Masquerade	Alfred Hui, Win Win Yeung	Lewis Lau @ LEWImage	KC, Carol
2023	Phat N Fresh	Leung Yip	Lewis Lau @ LEWImage	Ocean, Yen
2023	Sensei	WinWin	Lewis Lau @ LEWImage	KC
2023	Throw Away	WinWin	Isaac Woo @ COLLAB	—N/a

== Choreographic works ==
- P1X3L - Just Lean On Me (2021)
- Lolly Talk - Triple Sweetness (2022)
- Collar - OFF/ON (2022)
- Kilby Chan - Sour Funny (2023)
