= Cloud Wan =

Hong Kong singer

Cloud Wan 雲浩影
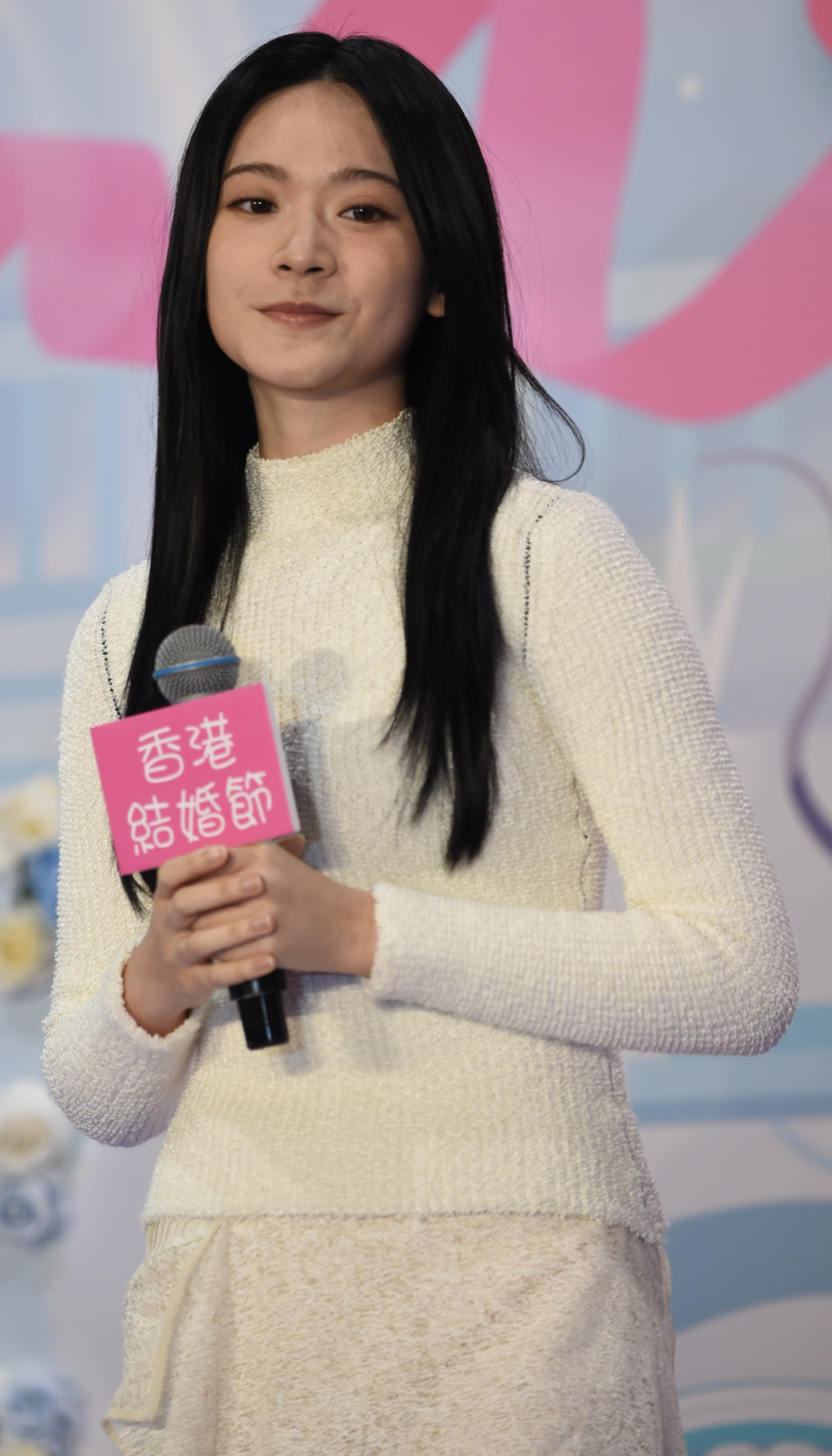
- Wan in 2023

Background information
- Born: 5 July 1997 (age 29); Hong Kong
- Genres: Cantopop; Pop
- Occupations: Singer; actress
- Instruments: Vocals, piano
- Years active: 2022–present
- Label: Media Asia Music

Cloud Wan Ho-ying (Chinese: 雲浩影, born 5 July 1997), is a Hong Kong singer and actress. She is known for joining ViuTV's reality talent competition King Maker III in 2020. She received the most audiences votes in the finale and finished 4th in the competition. She signed a record deal with Media Asia Music and made her solo debut on 5 May 2022 with the single "Wing Of Desire".

== Early life ==
Cloud Wan was a member of child group "Honey Bees" formed by Nancy Sit's art school when she was thirteen. She was working in an office before joining the King Maker III competition, she was still working in an office after the competition. Later, she decided to be a full-time singer.

== Discography ==
=== Extended plays ===
Title	Album details	Tracklisting	Ref.
The Cloud	Released: 19 December 2022; Label: Media Asia Music	Cantonese Songs: 1. Wing of Desire; 2. Distancing; 3. Close Contact; 4. Flow (Feat. AF); English Songs: 1. Nothing; 2. Hand Hold (Digital Only)	
Introduction to Pain	Released: 28 March 2024; Label: Media Asia Music	Cantonese Songs: 1. Natural High; 2. To Good to Be; 3. The Nameless Sorrow; 4. Let Go of Letting Go; 5. Memento; English Song: 1. To Let a Good Thing Die	

=== Singles ===
- "Wing of Desire" (2022)
- "Distancing" (2022)
- "Close Contact" (2022)
- "Flow" (Feat. AF) (2022)
- "Natural High" (2023)
- "The Nameless Sorrow" (2023)
- "Let go of letting go" (2023)
- "Memento" (2024)
- "Breaking Up Slowly" (2024)
- "Dizzy" (2024)
- "Make Me Laugh" (2024)
- "One more stranger" (2024)
- "You're Always There" (2025)
- "Acrophobia" (2025)
- "Your loss, not mine" (2025)

=== Collaborations ===
Title	Year	Album	Artists	Notes/Ref.
"Hitchhiking (順風車)"	2023	Ireallylovetosing	Leo Ku and Cloud Wan	

== Filmography ==
=== Film ===
Year	Title	Role	Notes/Ref.
2022	Life Must Go On	Chewie	

=== Drama ===
Year	Title	Platform
2024	The Divination Gossip Club	Viu

=== Television Show ===
Year	Title	Network	Role	Note
2020	King Maker III	ViuTV	Contestant	
2021	Youngster Show Time	ViuTV	Host	
2023	King Maker V Final	ViuTV	Performer	Performed with contestant Hei Chun

=== Cantonese dub ===
Year	Title	Chinese Title	Role	Notes/Ref.
2025	Crayon Shin-chan the Movie: Super Hot! The Spicy Kasukabe Dancers	蠟筆小新：超華麗！灼熱的春日部舞者	Ariana	

== Videography ==
=== Music videos ===
Year	Song	Artist(s)	Director(s)
2020	Prequel	King Maker III Contestants	Himtos Lam, Alfred Cho
2022	Wing Of Desire	Cloud Wan	Ah Dee Mr. Tong
2022	Distancing	Cloud Wan	Manlam, Pixel Ivan@20th Century Boys
2022	Close Contact	Cloud Wan	WootWoot, Pixel Ivan@20th Century Boys
2022	Flow	Cloud Wan Featuring AF	Rony Kong
2023	Natural High	Cloud Wan	Kendra Koh
2023	Hitchhiking	Leo Ku, Cloud Wan	Dorothy Lau
2023	The Nameless Sorrow	Cloud Wan	Heiward Mak
2023	Let go of letting go	Cloud Wan	Dorothy Lau
2024	Memento	Cloud Wan	Heiward Mak
2024	Impatient	Ansonbean	Terry To
2024	Breaking Up Slowly	Cloud Wan	J.him Lee
2024	Dizzy	Cloud Wan	Pixel Ivan
2024	Buddha's Palm	ILUB	Eddie Leung
2024	Make Me Laugh	Cloud Wan	

== Awards and nominations ==
Award ceremony	Year	Category	Result	Ref.
Yahoo Asia Multiverse Buzz Awards	2022	Music Rookies (Female)	Won	
Metro Radio Hits Music Awards	2022	Best Rookies	Won	
Ultimate Song Chart Awards Presentation	2022	Best Female Rookies	Gold	
Top Ten Chinese Gold Songs Award	2022	Best Female Rookies	Gold	
Chill Club Chart Award Presentation	2022/23	Best Female Rookies	Silver	
