= Ansonbean =

Hong Kong singer

Ansonbean 陳毅燊
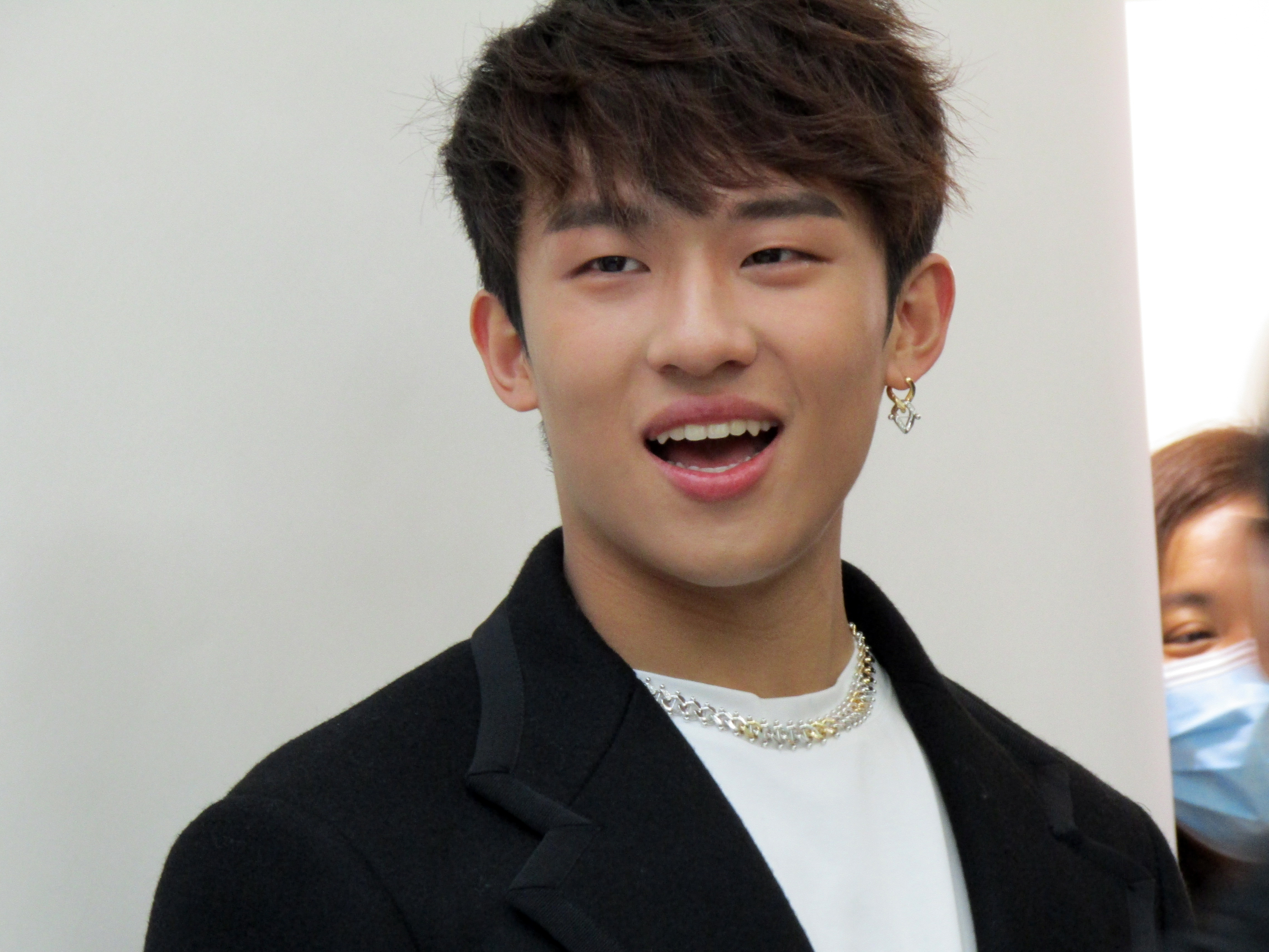
- Ansonbean in 2021

Background information
- Born: Anson Chan Ngai-san; 22 November 2000 (age 25); Hong Kong
- Genres: Cantopop; dance-pop; hip-hop
- Occupations: Singer; actor
- Years active: 2020–present
- Labels: Media Asia Music, Cool Style

Anson Chan Ngai-san (Chinese: 陳毅燊; born 22 November 2000), better known by his stage name ANSONBEAN, is a Hong Kong singer and actor. He won third place in ViuTV's reality talent competition King Maker III in 2020. He made his solo debut on 26 July 2021 with the single "Crush (oh no!)". He is a main role in drama Lovesignal and Killing Procedures. He earned a nomination for the Best Original Film Song in Warriors of Future at 41st Hong Kong Film Awards in 2023.

== Discography ==
=== Studio albums ===
Title	Album details	Tracklisting	Ref.
One Dance	Released: 28 August 2024; Label: Media Asia Music; Formats: CD, digital download, streaming	1. Intro: Rise; 2. OMG (on my grind); 3. The Tipping Point; 4. Love / Pain; 5. Get Wild (Feat. AKIKO) - Ansonbean & Kayan9896; 6. Call Me (Late at Night), Pt.2 - Ansonbean & Thaimay; 7. Impatient; 8. One Dance; 9. Outro: Peace of Mind; 10. One Dance (English Version)	

=== Singles ===
- "Crush (oh no!)" (2021)
- "You Made My Day" (2021)
- "Rise" (2022)
- "OMG (on my grind)" (2022)
- "LOVE/PAIN" (2022)
- "Ain't No Smarties" (2023)
- "CALL ME (Late At Night)" (2023)
- "Impatient" (2024)
- "One Dance" (2024)
- "N/A" (2025)
- "Headshot" (2025) (Good Game Theme Song)

=== Collaborations ===
- "@princejoyce" (Feat. ANSONBEAN) with Joyce Cheng (2021)
- "You made my day" with Lai Ying (2021)
- "明日之明日" (Warriors of Future Theme Song) with Winka Chan (2022)
- "作動小愛戀" ( Lovesignal Theme Song) with Kayan9896 and Lam Chin Ting (2022)
- "Canned Soup" (Soup Version) with Chase Chan (2022)
- "OMG" (Grind Version) feat Chase Chan (2022)
- "Get Wild" feat Kayan9896 (2023)
- "Call Me (Late at Night), Pt. 2" with Thaimay (2024)

== Filmography ==
=== Films ===
Year	Title	Notes/Ref.
2023	Tales from the Occult: Body and Soul	
2024	Rob N Roll	
2024	The Lyricist Wannabe	
2024	An Abandoned Team	
2025	Good Game	
TBA	A Hidden Spy	
TBA	Stinky Tofu	
TBA	We're Nothing At All	

=== Dramas ===
Year	Title	Role	Network	Notes/Ref.
2022	I Swim	Cheung Ho	ViuTV	Cameo (EP.9)
2022	Lovesignal	Jason	Viu	Main Role
2023	Killing Procedures	Jing	ViuTV	Main Role
2023	Sparks	Yip Ho Tin	ViuTV	

=== Television shows ===
Year	Title	Network	Role	Note
2020	King Maker III	ViuTV	Contestant	Bronze

== Videography ==
=== Music videos ===
Year	Song	Artist(s)	Director(s)	Choreographer(s)
2020	"Prequel"	King Maker III Contestants	Himtos Lam and Alfred Cho	Yiu@ids, Jolin@ids and Jonathon@ids
2021	"@princejoyce"	Joyce Cheng featuring Ansonbean	Eddie.Yo (Ansonbean's Part)	—N/a
2021	"Crush (oh no!)"	Ansonbean	Welby Chung	Geoff Lin
2021	"You Made My Day"	Ansonbean	Welby Chung	—N/a
2021	"You Made My Day (with Lai Ying)"	Ansonbean and Lai Ying	Eddie Leung	—N/a
2022	"Rise"	Ansonbean	Lewis Lau	Jervin Racan
2022	"OMG (on my grind)"	Ansonbean	Dadude Terry	—N/a
2022	"Love/Pain"	Ansonbean	Faith Ma	—N/a
2023	"Ain’t No Smarties"	Ansonbean	Kendra Koh	—N/a
2023	"Get Wild"	Ansonbean and Kayan9896	Terry To	Jervin Racan
2023	"CALL ME (Late At Night)"	Ansonbean	Terry To	—N/a
2024	"Impatient"	Ansonbean	Terry To	Fatboy
2024	"One Dance"	Ansonbean	Poon Realiam	—N/a

== Awards and nominations ==
Music

Year	Award ceremony	Category	Result	Work	Ref.
2021	2021 Metro Radio Music Awards	Best Newcomer	Won	—N/a	
2022	Hong Kong Gold Songs Award Presentation Ceremony 2021/2022	Best Male Newcomer Awards	Bronze	—N/a	
2022	Metro Radio Music Awards	Best Dance Songs	Won	"Rise"	

Film and television

Award	Year	Nominee / Work	Category	Result	Ref.
Hong Kong Film Award	2023	"Tomorrow of Tomorrow"(明日之明日) from Warriors of Future	Best Original Film Song	Nominated	
