= 2021 Metro Radio Music Awards =

2021 edition of an award ceremony

- Date: 27 December 2021
- Location: Hong Kong Convention and Exhibition Centre, Hong Kong
- Hosted by: Eric Cheng; Ricky Fan; Tze Man; Lai Lei
- Website: 2021 Metro Radio Awards

Television/radio coverage
- Network: viuTV

The 2021 Metro Radio Music Awards (Chinese: 新城勁爆頒獎禮2021) was held at the Hong Kong Convention and Exhibition Centre on 27 December 2021. It recognized the best Cantopop recordings, compositions, and artistes of the eligibility year.

== Winners ==
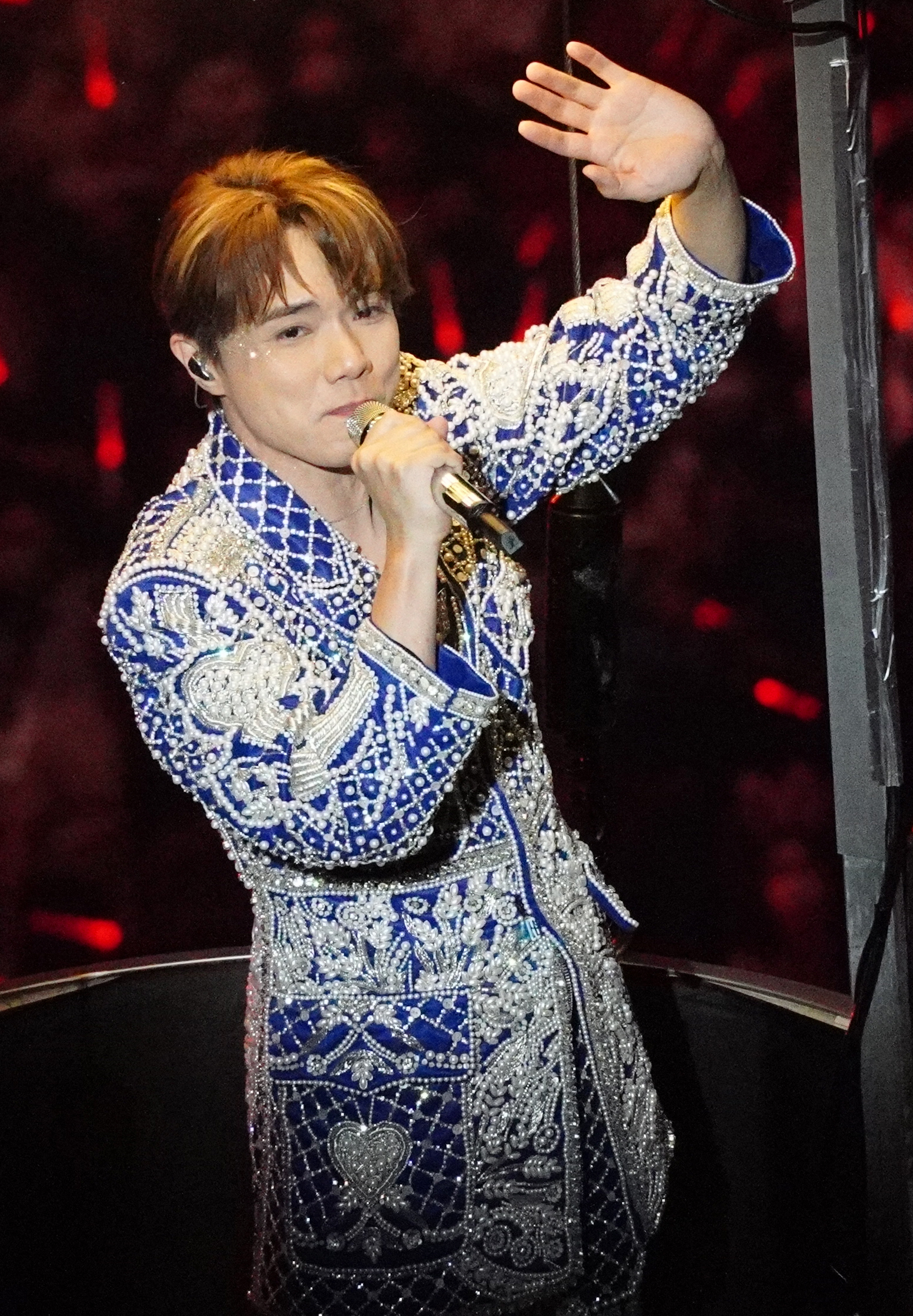
Hins Cheung received three awards.

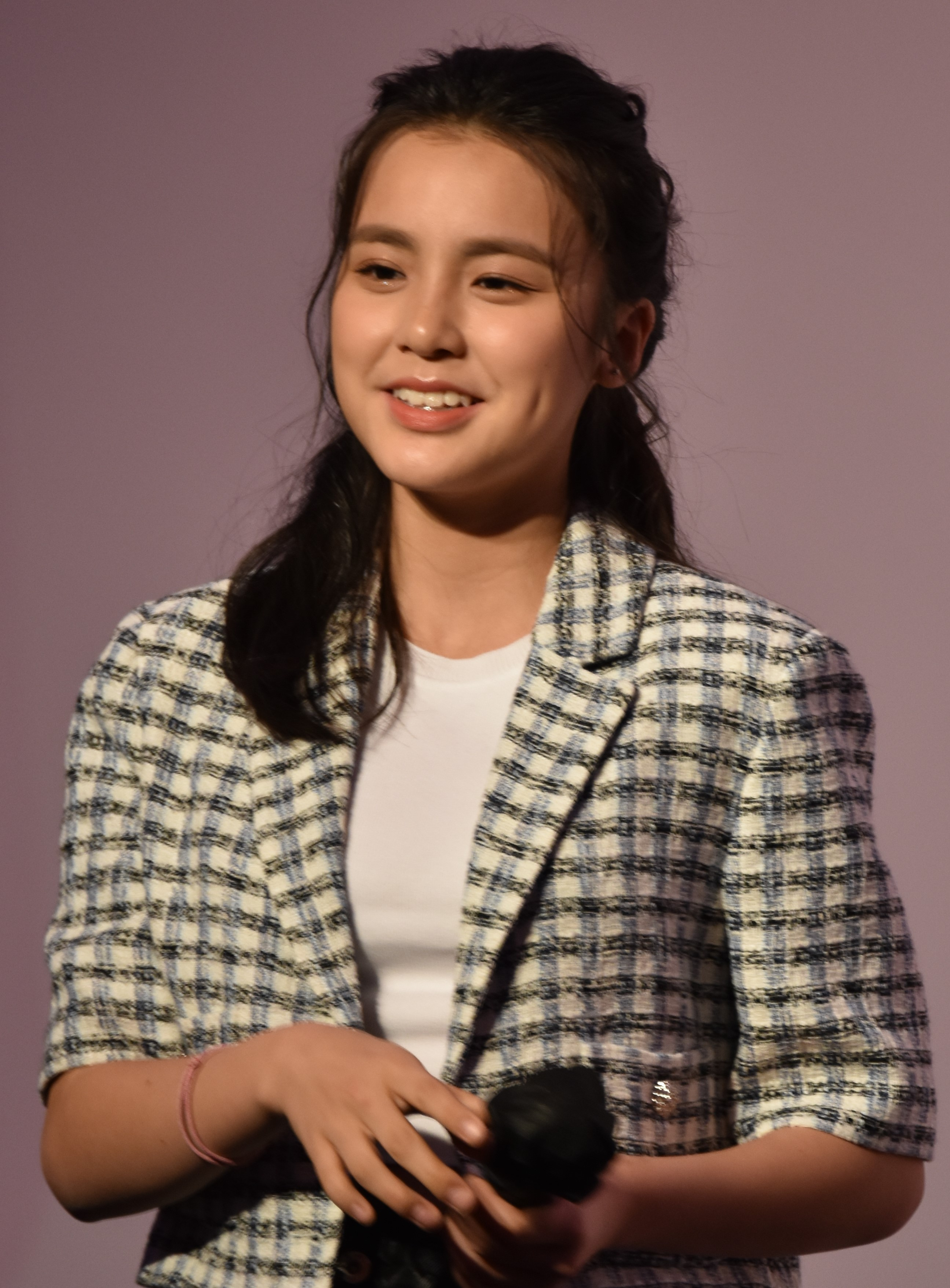
Chantel Yiu, the youngest winner in the awards' history

Category	Artiste(s)	Work	Ref.
Top 10 Songs of the Year	Jay Fung	"Miss Somebody" (思念即地獄)	
Top 10 Songs of the Year	Vincy Chan	"Sea Of Thorns" (荊棘海)	
Top 10 Songs of the Year	Hubert Wu	"I Don't Feel Like Working Today" (今天不營業)	
Top 10 Songs of the Year	C AllStar	"For Those Who Stay, For Those Who'd Left" (留下來的人)	
Top 10 Songs of the Year	Angela Hui	"I'm Sorry"	
Top 10 Songs of the Year	Terence Lam	"A Word Back In Time" (時光倒流一句話)	
Top 10 Songs of the Year	Sukie Shek	"100-year Memorandum" (100歲備忘錄)	
Top 10 Songs of the Year	Joyce Cheng	"First Tear Last Salute" (先哭為敬)	
Top 10 Songs of the Year	MIRROR	"BOSS"	
Top 10 Songs of the Year	Alfred Hui	"Tranquility Of Life" (佛系人生)	
Best New Media Songs	Hana Kuk	"Fear In My Heart" (我會害怕)	
Best New Media Songs	Stephanie Cheng	"Drink More Water" (多喝水)	
Best New Media Songs	Gladys Li	"Missing Something" (差一些什麼?)	
Best Classic Remakes	Simon Au	"Draw A Rainbow" (畫出彩虹) (originally by Danny Chan)	
Best Classic Remakes	Elly	"Love Story Part 1" (愛的故事 上集) (originally by Eric Suen)	
Best Classic Remakes	Rowena Cortes	"My Story" (我的故事) (originally by Danny Chan)	
Best Duet	Delta T, Uka Yeung	Lonely Night (都市)	
Best Mandarin Song	Vivian Koo	"Stubborn" (倔強)	
Best Trending Song	Hins Cheung	"What Separates Us" (俏郎君)	
Album of the Year	Hins Cheung	The Brightest Darkness	
Composer of the Year	Howie Yung	"Drink More Water" (多喝水)	
Lyricist of the Year	Chow Yiu-fai	"Sea of Thorns" (荊棘海)	
Music Arranger of the Year	Allan Lau	"My Story" (我的故事)	
Producer of the Year	Schumann Lee	"First Tear Last Salute" (先哭為敬)	
Music Production of the Year	Alan Kan	Anthropocene (人類世) by C AllStar	
Artiste of the Year	Hins Cheung		
Outstanding Song Interpreter	Alfred Hui		
"Giant Leap" Singers	Tsang Lok-tung, Karen Kong, Kochun Tse, Feanna Wong, Grace Wong		
Best Singer-songwriters	Angela Hui, Terence Lam		
Male Singers of the Year	Jay Fung, Hubert Wu, Jer Lau		
Female Singers of the Year	Vincy Chan, Hana Kuk, Joyce Cheng		
Best Musical Group	C AllStar, ERROR, MIRROR		
Best Musical Band	ToNick		
Best Newcomer	Ansonbean, Lagchun, Lokman Yeung, Amy Tang, Gigi Yim, Chantel Yiu		
Popular Idols	Anson Lo, Anson Kong, Ian Chan		
Top Indie Artistes	Terrence Ma, Ying Chi Yuet, Mansonvibes		
Breakthrough Singer	Zaina Sze		
Audience's Favorite Newcomer	Edan Lui		
Audience's Favorite Singer	Keung To		
Audience's Favorite Songs	Ruco Chan	"Zero Years Old" (零歲)	
Audience's Favorite Songs	Jinny Ng	"Fire and the Match" (火和火柴)	
Audience's Favorite Songs	Deep Ng	"X Factors" (十倍速)	
