= Marife Yau =

Marife Yau 邱彥筒
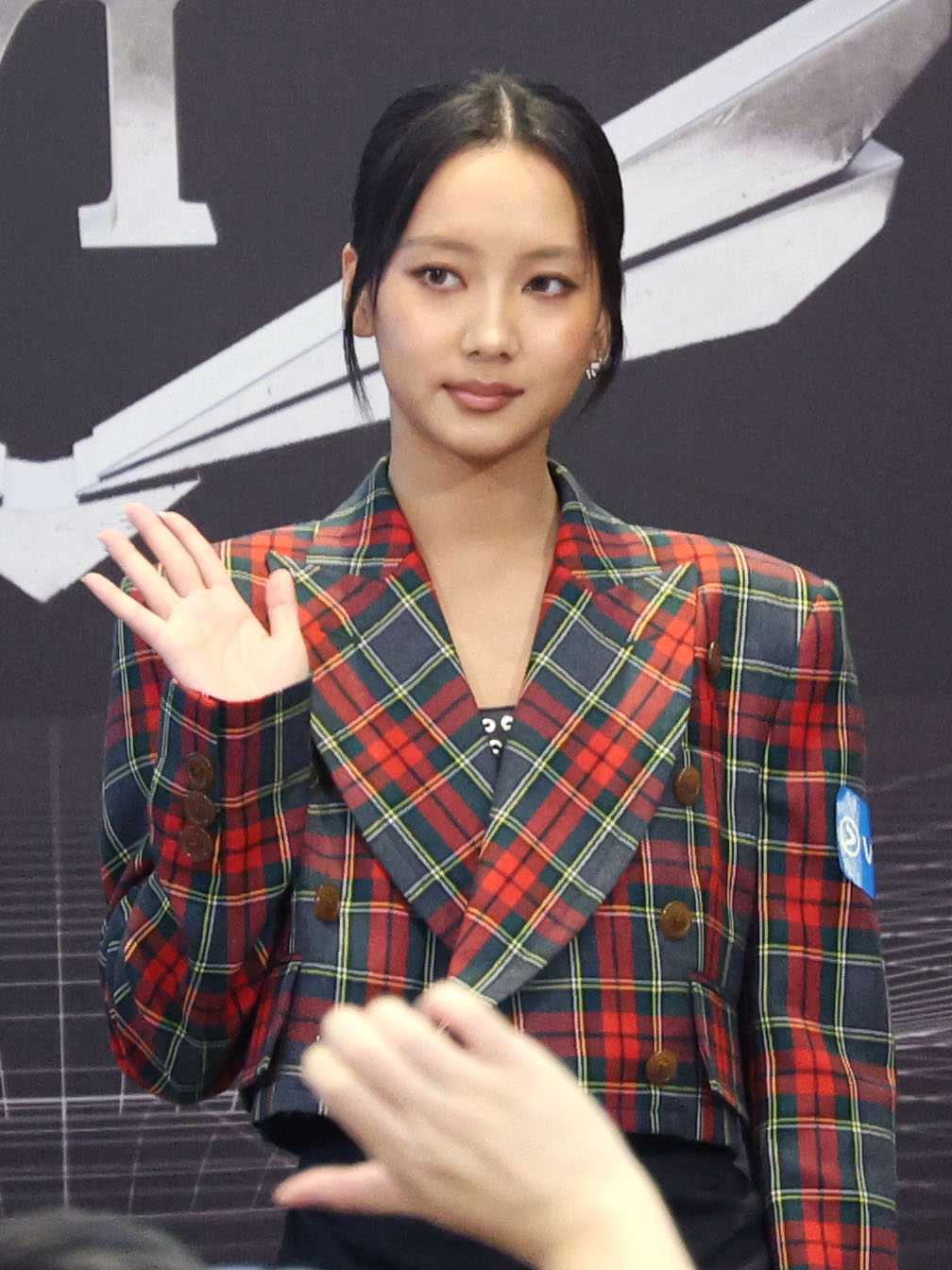
- Marife Yau in 2025

Background information
- Born: 11 June 2002 (age 24); Hong Kong
- Genres: Cantopop; Dance-pop; R&B
- Occupations: Singer; dancer; actress
- Years active: 2022–present
- Labels: Music Nation Records; HK Television Entertainment/ MakerVille

Marife Yau (Chinese: 邱彥筒; Cantonese Yale: Yāu Yihntùhng; born 11 June 2002), known professionally as Marf, is a Hong Kong singer. She is the winner of ViuTV's King Maker IV reality TV show. She is currently a member of the Cantopop girl group Collar.

== Early life ==
Prior to joining King Maker, Yau was a veterinary nurse.

== Music career ==
Marf debuted as a member of the Cantopop girl group Collar. On 12 January 2022, Collar released "Call My Name!" as its debut single. Marf additionally released four singles as a solo artist. The singles are "*~Silencio...Shh", "Fool##", " // Undecided //", and "I'm Marf-elous". She has additionally been a voice actress for the Chinese version of One Piece Film: Red.

Marf fans are known as "Muffins".

== Discography ==
=== Singles ===
Cantonese

- "*~Silencio...Shh" (2023)
- "fOoL##" (2023)
- "// Undecided //" (2023)
- "I'm Marf-elous" (2023)
- "TXT OR CALL" (2024)
- "Teeny Tiny Heart" (2024)
- "Love Me Down" (2025)
- "The Sea" (2025)

English

- "Nothing about you" (2024)
- "To'pA'ti" (2025)
- "Rrrr" (2026)

=== Collaborations ===
Title	Year	Album	Artists	Notes
"仍有心跳脈搏" (Still have heartbeat and pulse)	2023	—N/a	Maniac feat. Marf Yau	
"Distraction" (分心)	2023	—N/a	Billy Choi feat. Marf Yau	
"All That I Want"	2024	—N/a	Jay Fung feat. Marf Yau	

=== Songwriting credits ===
Title	Year	Album	Artists	Notes
"Anthropology" (亻言)	2022	In the round	Alfred Hui	Composer (with Alfred Hui and CK Wong)

== Filmography ==
=== Films ===
Year	Title	Chinese Title	Role	Notes
2024	Blossoms Under Somewhere	寄了一整個春天		Main Role

=== Television dramas ===
Year	Title	Chinese title	Role	Network	Notes
2023	Left on read	那年盛夏我們綻放如花	Yeung Yuet Ying	ViuTV	Main Role
2025	Where is my 15 minutes	哪一天我們會紅	Michelle	ViuTV	Main Role

=== Cantonese dub ===
Year	Title	Chinese Title	Role	Notes
2022	One Piece Film: Red	-	Uta	
2025	Zootopia 2	優獸大都會2	Gazelle	

== Tours ==
Opening act

- Coldplay – Music of the Spheres World Tour (2025)
