= Lolly Talk =

Hong Kong Cantopop girl group

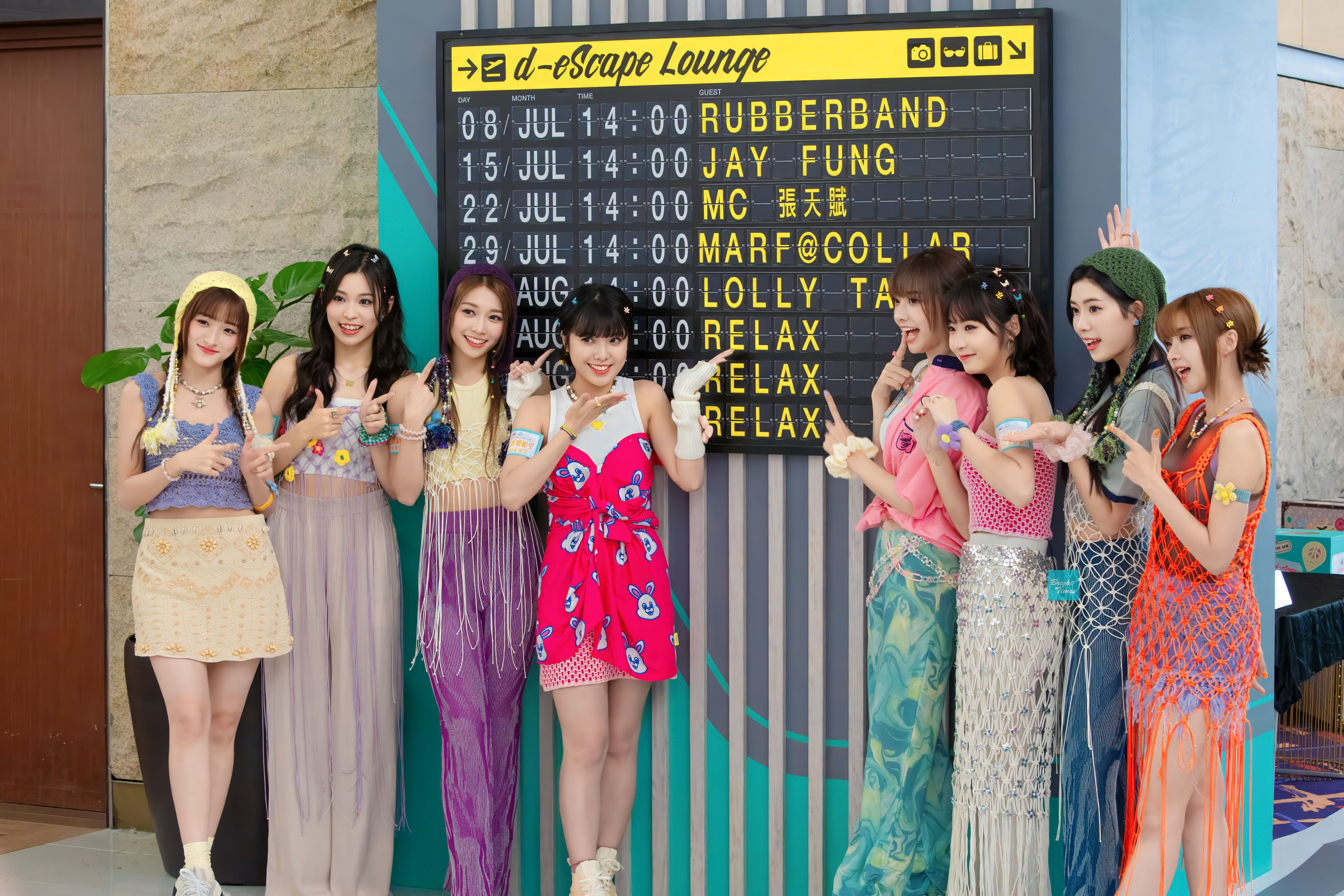
- From left to right: Ah Yo, Mui, Yanny, Meimei, Sinnie, Elka, Tania, Egg

Background information
- Origin: Hong Kong, China
- Genres: Cantopop; Dance-pop; Rock; R&B
- Years active: 2022–present
- Labels: Daymaker Creatives
- Members: Meimei Tsang; Sinnie Ng; Yanny Lau; Violet Wong; Elka Cheng; Tania Chan; Melody Wong; Yoyo Kwok
- Website: YouTube channel

Lolly Talk is a Hong Kong Cantopop girl group. They are contestants from ViuTV's reality girl group survival show King Maker IV in 2021. They officially debuted on 11 July 2022.

== History ==
The group formed in late 2021 when Egg, MeiMei, Elka, Tania, Ahyo and Day (Rejena Simkhada) got together to shoot a Christmas cover version of Hong Kong girl group As One’s “Candy Ball”. Day later left to join the girl group Collar, and Sinnie, Yanny and Mui joined and formulated the current line-up of Lolly Talk.

On 15 April 2022, Lolly Talk released the song 8SEC for an e-sports promotion campaign. This is the first song since the formation of the group.

They officially debuted on 11 July 2022 with the song Triple Sweetness.

On 28 and 29 November 2023, they held their debut concerts at Star Hall in Kowloon Bay.

In 2023, Lolly Talk's 4 songs were all weekly top 10 hits in the three local radio charts, while 3 of them were weekly No.1 hit (5 times in total).

On 5 April 2024, Lolly Talk performed 4 songs at the opening ceremony of "2024 Hong Kong Sevens" at the Hong Kong Stadium.

== Current members ==
English name	Traditional Chinese Name	Member Alias	Birthday	Height
Meimei Tsang	曾美欣	Mei Mei	12 August 1992 (age 33)	154cm
Sinnie Ng	吳倩怡	Sinnie	2 January 1998 (age 27)	168cm
Yanny Lau	劉綺婷	Yanny	21 September 1998 (age 27)	164cm
Violet Wong	黃詠霖	Egg (阿蛋)	11 October 2001 (age 24)	161cm
Elka Cheng	鄭芷淇	Elka	9 October 2002 (age 23)	162cm
Tania Chan	陳紀澄	Tania	20 December 2002 (age 22)	172cm
Melody Wong	黃敏蕎	Mui (阿妹)	9 October 2004 (age 21)	173cm
Yoyo Kwok	郭曉妍	Ah Yo	28 December 2004 (age 20)	160cm

== Non-active member ==
English name	Traditional Chinese Name	Member Alias	Birthday	Height
Rejena Simkhada	許軼	Day	4 June 2002 (age 23)	161cm

== Discography ==
=== Albums ===
- 10+1 (30 September 2024)

=== Singles ===
Peak chart positions
Year	Song	CRHK	RTHK	Metro Radio	TVB	ViuTV	Others
2022	Triple Sweetness (三分甜)	15	2	5	×	-	
2022	5 Ciphers Of Love (五種愛的密語)	2	6	3	×	-	Canadian Chinese POP Music Chart: 5
2023	My Seven Stars (七姊妹星團)	1	1	1	×	-	Canadian Chinese POP Music Chart: 7
2023	Set a Fire (一把火)	1	2	5	x	5	
2023	For Us (四方帽之約)	5	3	4	x	-	Canadian Chinese POP Music Chart: 20
2023	Daydreaming Our Little Things (二人限定故事)	10	2	1	x	-	
2024	Six Degrees of Connection (六度相隔理論)	11	3	1	x	-	
2024	#9999 (九千九百九十九個我)	6	1	1	x	-	
2024	#10Count (數到十)	3	1	1	x	-	
2024	Singularity of S0ul (靈魂奇異點)	4	2	2	x	4	

=== Collaborations ===
Title	Year	Album	Artists	Notes
"Star War (星戰)"	2023	Ireallylovetosing	Leo Ku & New Generation	

== Filmography ==
=== Television shows ===
Year	Title	Network	Note
2021	King Maker IV	ViuTV	Contestants
2022	Music Five	RTHK TV 31	Guest: Sinnie Ng
2023	Cantopop Power Ep.18	RTHK TV 31	Guests
2023	Music Five	RTHK TV 31	Guests
2023	What happens to our body (醫家搞邊科)	RTHK TV 31	Guests: Meimei Tsang, Yanny Lau, Tania Chan, Yoyo Kwok
2023	Chill Club	ViuTV	Guests
2023	MM730 - Beast fight game	ViuTV	Guests
2023	Sign Language Learning Class S3 (有聲無聲講你聽) Ep.3	RTHK TV 31	Guest: Sinnie Ng
2024	Hong Kong Phenomenon 3 (香港奇則3) Ep.5	HOY TV	Guests: MeiMei Tsang, Violet Wong
2024	Music Five	RTHK TV 31	Guests
2024	Stories from MEOW MEOW (尋找喵喵的故事) Ep.6,13	HOY TV	Guest: Melody Wong
2024	Fate Stay Home (見招拆招風水局) Ep.10	HOY TV	Guests: Violet Wong, Yoyo Kwok
2024	Lolly Talk Pet (Lolly Lolly寵物拯救隊)	HOY TV	Hosts

== Videography ==
=== Music videos ===
Year	Title	Artist(s)	Director(s)	Choreographer(s)	Length	Ref.
2021	"Candy Ball" (Cover) (Xmas ver.)	Ahyo, Elka, Day, Meimei, Tania and Egg		Yanny Lau	3:34	Related to King Maker IV Team A2
2021	"Candy Ball" (Cover) (Xmas ver.)	Ahyo, Elka, Day, Meimei, Tania, Egg, Sinnie and Yanny		Yanny Lau	2:25	
2022	"8SEC"	Lolly Talk	Endy Chan, Justin Law @ Ace' Delusion Studio	Ali@Themepark.Entertainment	4:02	
2022	"Triple Sweetness"	Lolly Talk	Justin Law @ Ace' Delusion Studio	Win Win Yeung, Carol Yip	5:00	
2022	"5 Ciphers Of Love"	Lolly Talk	Boris Wong	Pang2	4:31	
2023	"My Seven Stars"	Lolly Talk	Endy Chan, Gary Hui (feelgoodinn)	Pang2	3:35	
2023	"Set a Fire"	Lolly Talk	Neji Leung	Pang2	3:06	
2023	"For Us"	Lolly Talk	Borry Su	—	4:01	
2023	"Star War"	Leo Ku & New Generation	JerL & Lance Luk	—	5:48	
2023	"Daydreaming Our Little Things"	Lolly Talk	Endy Chan	Pang2	3:23	
2024	"Six Degrees of Connection"	Lolly Talk	Arme Lam and Kwokin	—	4:03	
2024	"#9999"	Lolly Talk	Kwokin	Pang2 and Gabe	3:45	
2024	"#10Count"	Lolly Talk	Lolly Management Limited	—	4:20	

== Concerts ==
Year	Date	Name	Venue	Note
2023	28-29 November	Lolly Talk Little Things Concert 2023	Star Hall, KITEC	

=== Joint concerts ===
Year	Date	Name	Venue	Note
2022	31 July	Bloom Girls Fest (花漾女生音樂祭)	Macpherson Stadium, Hong Kong	
2022	4 October	Restpiration Concert 2022	Macpherson Stadium, Hong Kong	

== Music festivals ==
Year	Date	Name	Venue	Note
2022	12 August	Awaken Festival	Summit (Hall 2), AsiaWorld–Expo	
2022	14 August	Summer Blossom Music Festival	Music Zone, KITEC	
2022	1 October	TONE Music Festival	AsiaWorld–Arena, AsiaWorld–Expo	
2022	11 December	UNIK Asia Festival	Central Harbourfront Event Space, Central Harbourfront	
2023	30 April	SPACE MUSIC FESTIVAL	AXA x WONDERLAND, West Kowloon Cultural District	
2023	1 October	TONE Music Festival	AsiaWorld–Arena, AsiaWorld–Expo	

== Other ventures ==
- "8SEC" is the theme song for Hong Kong Esports Premier League Season 2.
- The whole group was invited to Hong Kong Disneyland to promote its new character, LinaBell.
- They were models for Sony Xperia 1 V in 2023, followed by Sony Xperia 1 VI in 2024.

== Awards and nominations ==
Year	Award	Category	Nominee / Work	Result
2022	Ultimate Song Chart Awards Presentation	Ultimate New Groups	—	Silver
2022	Ultimate Song Chart Awards Presentation	Audience's Favourite Group	—	Final 10
2022	Metro Radio Music Awards	Best Newcomers	—	Won
2022	Top Ten Chinese Gold Songs Award	Best Female Newcomers	—	Merit Award
2023	Ultimate Song Chart Awards Presentation	Top 10 Songs of the Year	Set a Fire (一把火)	5th Place
2023	Ultimate Song Chart Awards Presentation	Ultimate Groups	—	Silver
2023	Ultimate Song Chart Awards Presentation	Audience's Favourite Group	—	Final 5
2023	Metro Radio Music Awards	Best Improvement Group	—	Won
2024	Top Ten Chinese Gold Songs Award	Best Bands/Groups	—	Silver
2024	Top Ten Chinese Gold Songs Award	Best Improvement	—	Gold
2024	Metro Radio Music Awards	Best Bands/Groups	—	Gold
2025	Chill Club Chart Award Presentation 24/25	Best Groups	—	Bronze
2025	Top Ten Chinese Gold Songs Award	Best Bands/Groups	—	Silver
2025	Top Ten Chinese Gold Songs Award	Top 10 Songs of the Year	10Count (數到十)	Awarded
