= Travel with Rivals =

Travel television programme

Travel with Rivals (Chinese: 跟住矛盾去旅行; Jyutping: gan1 zyu6 maau4 teon5 heoi3 leoi5 hang4) is a Hong Kong television travel programme premiered on 6 April 2016, produced by HK Television Entertainment and broadcast on ViuTV. The show brings together two people from different backgrounds, with conflicting core values, for a five-day trip to another part of the world.

== Episodes ==
The first episode lasted one hour, with the first half-hour serving as a preview of the series.

No.	Destination	Original release date	Viewers (ratings / percentage)
1	"Warsaw, Poland"	6 April 2016	8 / 12.50%
2	"Warsaw, Poland"	11 April 2016	N/A
3	"Warsaw, Poland"	12 April 2016	N/A
Guests: Leung Kwok-hung and Jasper Tsang Yok-sing Tsang, the founder of DAB in the pro-Beijing camp, is the President of the Legislative Council of Hong Kong, while Leung, the chairman of League of Social Democrats in the pan-democracy camp, is a LegCo member.
4	"Hanoi, Vietnam"	18 April 2016	N/A
5	"Hanoi, Vietnam"	19 April 2016	N/A
Guests: Yip Chung-Sing and Amanda Tann Both Yip and Chan are teachers, with Tann being a famed cram school teacher. In the show, both taught English to underprivileged students in Vietnam.
6	"Florence, Italy"	25 April 2016	N/A
7	"Florence, Italy"	26 April 2016	N/A
Guests: Shiga Lin and Gloria Yip Yip has a Cantopop singing career that has stretched for decades, while Lin hails from a new generation of Cantopop singers.
8	"Seoul, South Korea"	2 May 2016	N/A
9	"Seoul, South Korea"	3 May 2016	N/A
Guests: Ann Chiang and Roy Tsui Chiang is a Pro-Beijing member of Hong Kong's Legislative Council, while Tsui is an author. Neither Chiang or Tsui had any interaction with each other during the trip.
10	"Dublin, Ireland"	9 May 2016	N/A
11	"Dublin, Ireland"	10 May 2016	N/A
Guests: Zac Kao and Denise Ho Kao is an actor who is a devout Christian, while Ho is a Cantopop singer who has come out of the closet. In the show, both visited a formerly conservative Catholic country which has legalized same-sex marriage.
12	"Bali, Indonesia"	16 May 2016	N/A
13	"Bali, Indonesia"	17 May 2016	N/A
Guests: Renee Dai and Siu Yam-yam
14	"Tokyo, Japan"	23 May 2016	N/A
15	"Tokyo, Japan"	24 May 2016	N/A
Guests: Agnes Chow and Junius Ho Chow is a political activist, as well as the founder of Hong Kong political party Demosistō, while Ho is also a political activist, known for his opposition to the Occupy Central movement in 2014, which Chow was a proponent of.
16	"Off-site Highlights"	29 May 2016	N/A
