= Hong Kong Television =

Hong Kong Television is usually meant for:

- Television in Hong Kong: TV broadcast history in Hong Kong

The term may also refer to:

- HKTV: applied for a free TV license in Hong Kong but failed. Now obtained a mobile TV license and is applying for a free TV license in Hong Kong again
- HK Television Entertainment: officially obtained from the Hong Kong Government for 12 years of free TV license, and officially opened its channels
- TVB (Television Broadcasts Limited): obtained the first free TV license in Hong Kong since 1967. Currently holds partial trademarks of "HKTV", "Hong Kong Television"
- Hong Kong Television (magazine): discontinued magazine in Hong Kong, and was an official publication of Television Broadcasts Limited (TVB) during 1967–1997. But its official publication status was replaced by "TVB Weekly"
- RTHK Television: public TV broadcaster in Hong Kong, funded by the Hong Kong Government
