= Collar (group) =

Hong Kong Cantopop girl group

COLLAR
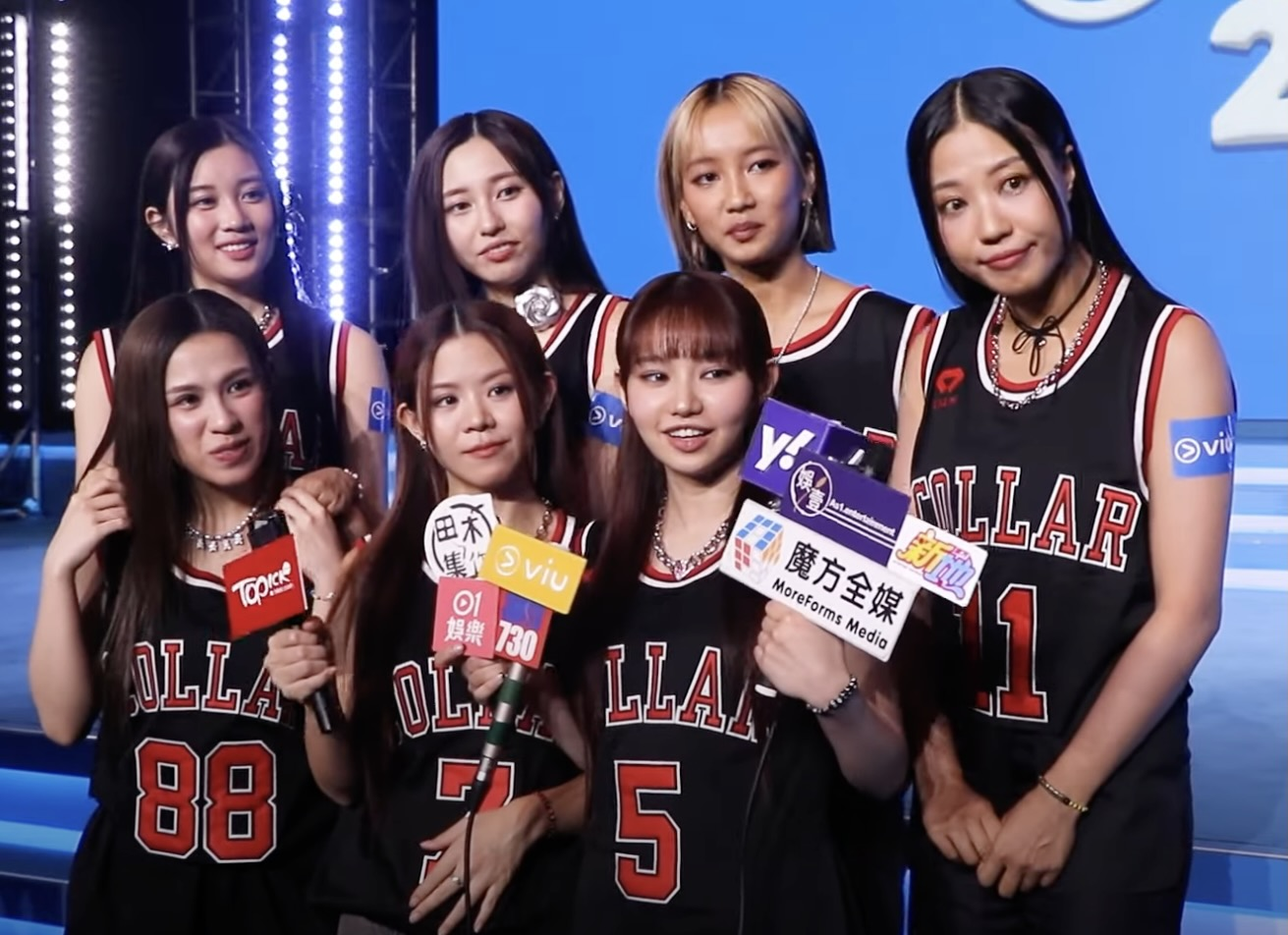
- Collar in an event in 2023; Back row from left: Candy, Ivy, Marf, Sumling; Front row from left: Winka, Gao, Day

Background information
- Origin: Hong Kong
- Genres: Cantopop; dance-pop; EDM
- Years active: 2022–present
- Labels: Music Nation Records; HK Television Entertainment/ MakerVille
- Members: Sumling Li; Garie Shum; Winka Chan; Ivy So; Rejena Simkhada; Marife Yau; Candy Wong
- Past members: Natalie So

Collar (commonly stylised in all caps) is a Hong Kong girl group formed from a television channel ViuTV's reality talent show King Maker IV operated by the broadcaster HK Television Entertainment in 2021. The group consists of seven members: Sumling Li, Garie Shum (Gao), Winka Chan, Ivy So, Rejena Simkhada (Day), Marife Yau (Marf), and Candy Wong. They debuted on 12 January 2022, with the first single "Call My Name!".

== History ==
=== 2021–22: Formation ===
In July 2018, ViuTV's reality talent competition series King Maker started scouting for potential artists, and after three seasons, three boy bands, namely Mirror, Error and P1X3L were formed, and some contestants debuted as solo singers. Nonetheless, since the first season of show started, there was no girl group that had formed. Hence, ViuTV created King Maker IV as a platform to scout for a brand new girl group in June 2021.

On 25 December 2021, ViuTV announced the winner, first runner-up and second runner-up of King Maker IV, Marife Yau, Garie Shum, and Rejena Simkhada, who were secured the spots of upcoming members of the group. On 12 January 2022, 8 contestants from King Maker IV were announced from the Top 20 of the season, formed the group through a press conference named "Hold Your Breath" which held in Harbour City. In the press conference, the name of the group "Collar", along with five other members, Sumling Li, Natalie So, Winka Chan, Ivy So and Candy Wong, were announced in the lineup.

The music video of Collar's debut "Call My Name!" was released a day after the formation of the group. On 24 January 2022, Pocari Sweat, a Japanese sports drink brand, appointed Collar as endorsers of the brand's 40th anniversary in Harbour City, marking the group's first commercial endorsement.

Collar gained their first peak chart in Metro Radio with their debut "Call My Name!" on 19 February 2022. On 30 May 2022, Collar's first variety show We Are Collar was broadcast on ViuTV.

Besides "Call My Name!", Collar also released three other singles in 2022, namely "Never-never Land", "Gotta Go!" and "Off/On". On 23 December 2022, Collar received a Cantopop rookie award at the Yahoo Asia Multiverse Buzz Awards 2022, being the first award the group received. The group also received rookie awards at the 2022 Metro Radio Music Awards and Ultimate Song Chart Awards Presentation 2022 on 29 December 2022 and 1 January 2023, respectively. They were also awarded "Best Groups Bronze Award" at Ultimate Song Chart Awards Presentation 2022.

=== 2023: Realignment as a seven-member group ===
On 10 May 2023, Natalie So announced her leaving from the group in a statement of social media, stating that her mental injury suffered from her boyfriend Moses Li after the 2022 Mirror concert incident had caused trauma that “could not be healed”, and she was unable to cope with the show business.

== Name ==
According to the group leader Garie Shum, the group's name "Collar" has two meanings: first, it refers to a collar of the shirt, which indicates a person can't breathe when the collar is fastened, means every performance can "hold your breath" and makes the audience hold their breath; second, it refers to a clavicle, which is the most attractive body part of women and defines Collar becomes the most attractive girl group.

== Members ==
=== Current members ===
English name	Traditional Chinese Name	Member Alias	Birthday	Rank in King Maker IV
Sumling Li	李芯駖	Sumling	18 April 1986 (age 40)	4
Garie Shum (Leader)	沈貞巧	Gao	7 January 1993 (age 33)	2
Winka Chan	陳泳伽	Winka	16 June 1998 (age 28)	7
Ivy So	蘇雅琳	Ivy	4 August 2001 (age 25)	10
Rejena Simkhada	許軼	Day	4 June 2002 (age 24)	3
Marife Yau	邱彥筒	Marf	11 June 2002 (age 24)	1
Candy Wong	王家晴	Candy	19 December 2002 (age 23)	8

=== Former member ===
English name	Traditional Chinese Name	Member Alias	Birthday	Rank in King Maker IV
Natalie So	蘇芷晴	So Ching	31 January 1996 (age 30)	6

== Discography ==
=== Singles ===
List of singles, with selected chart positions
Title	Year	Peak chart positions	Album
Title	Year	HK	Album
"Call My Name!"	2022	14	Non-album singles
"Never-never Land"	2022	2	Non-album singles
"Gotta Go!"	2022	24	Non-album singles
"Off/On"	2022	14	Non-album singles
"The Bright Side"	2023	—	Non-album singles
"Take Me Away"	2023	—	Non-album singles
"idc"	2023	—	Non-album singles
"Speak Love"	2023	—	Non-album singles
"Atypical"	2023	—	Non-album singles
"Back In The Game"	2024	—	Non-album singles
"Chosen Family"	2024	—	Non-album singles
"—" denotes a recording that did not chart.

== Filmography ==
=== Television shows ===
Year	Title	Platform	Note
2021	King Maker IV	ViuTV	
2022	We Are COLLAR	ViuTV	
2023	Shiny Summer – COLLAR in Japan	ViuTV	
2024	Happy COLLAR	ViuTV	

== Concerts ==
Year	Date	Name	Venue	Note
2024	22–24 March	Collar Crush Live 2024	Star Hall, KITEC	

== Awards and nominations ==
Award ceremony	Year	Category	Result
Yahoo Asia Multiverse Buzz Awards	2022	Music Rookies (Groups)	Won
Metro Radio Music Awards	2022	Best Rookies	Won
Ultimate Song Chart Awards Presentation	2022	Best Groups	Bronze
Ultimate Song Chart Awards Presentation	2022	Best Rookie Groups	Gold
Chill Club Chart Award Presentation	2022/23	Best Female Rookies	Gold
