= King Maker IV =

Hong Kong reality TV show

- Genre: Reality, Survival Competition
- Opening theme: 前傳
- Original language: Cantonese
- No. of episodes: 35

Production
- Running time: 60 minutes Final: 155 minutes

Original release
- Network: ViuTV
- Release: October 30 – December 25, 2021

Related
- Good Night Show - King Maker, King Maker II, King Maker III, King Maker V

King Maker IV (Chinese: 全民造星IV) is a 2021 Hong Kong survival reality show on ViuTV as fourth season of King Maker series, accepting only female contestants. It aired from 30 October to 25 December 2021, with Marife Yau (Marf) being the champion, Garie Shum (Gao) being the first runner-up and Rejena Simkhada (Day) being the second runner-up.

== Aftermath ==
Yau, Shum and Simkhada, along with five other contestants Sumling Li, Natalie So (So Ching), Winka Chan, Ivy So and Candy Wong, formed the official girl group Collar after the competition, with their first single Call My Name! released on 13 January 2022. Two additional girl groups, namely Lolly Talk and Strayz, are also formed after the competition.

Two contestants from the competition, Jamie Ho (Ho Pui) and Chloe Wong (Kwan Yi), debuted as soloists after the competition.

Five contestants from the competition, Sica Ho, Yoyo Kot, Alice Hui, Win Win Yeung and Ash Chung, signed to MakerVille, the production company split off from ViuTV, after the competition.
