= Ben Chiu (singer) =

Ben Chiu 趙祥誠
- Genres: Pop; Cantopop
- Years active: 2018–present

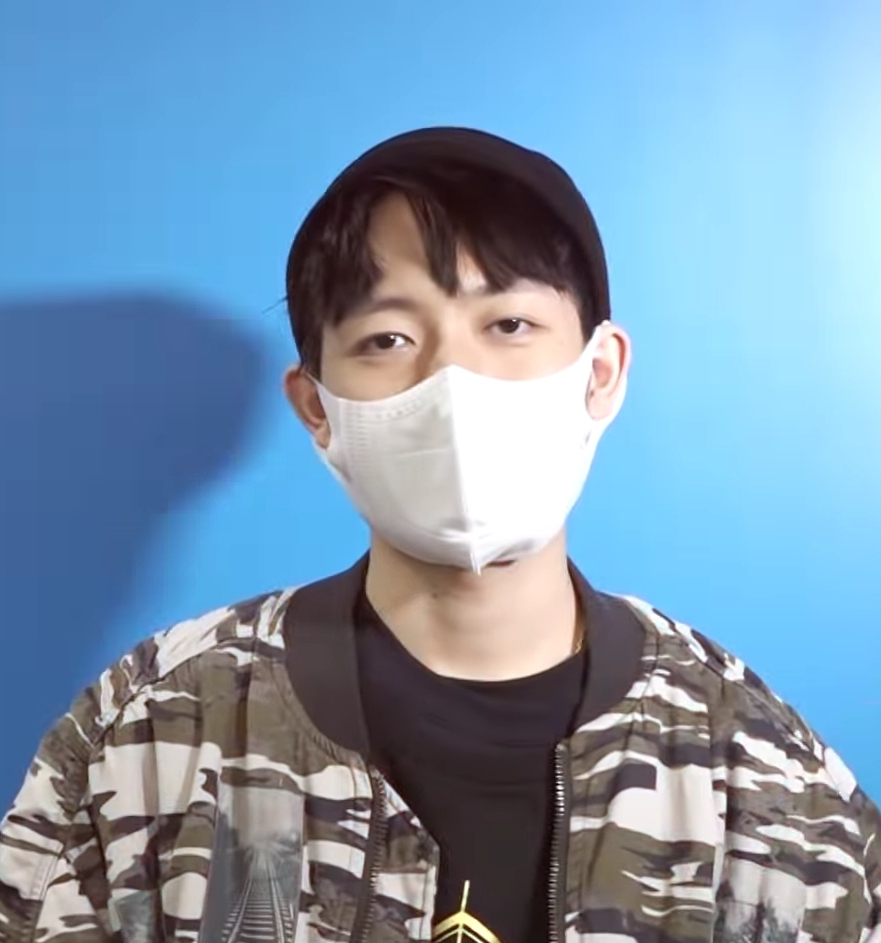
Image of Ben Chiu

Benny Chiu Cheung Shing (Chinese: 趙祥誠) is a Hong Kong dancer of bone-breaking dance and street dance, he officially joined the entertainment industry with the goal of becoming an all-round artist after participating in King Maker III in 2020. Ben once wrote for This! In the second season of Street Dance of China, he was selected as a member of the Vanness Wu team for his bone-breaking dance performance. He also participated in Season 6 of China's Got Talent and performed the bone-breaking dance, and was approved by three votes from judges Jin Xing, Yang Mi, and Chen Teng. Chiu participated in King Maker III, and got first prize. In 2024, Ben released the song "Young Freak" which he composed, wrote lyrics for and produced as an independent singer.
