= King Maker III =

Hong Kong reality TV show

- Genre: Reality, Survival Competition
- Opening theme: 前傳
- Original language: Cantonese
- No. of episodes: 35

Production
- Running time: 60 minutes Final: 165 minutes

Original release
- Network: ViuTV
- Release: November 2 – December 26, 2020

Related
- Good Night Show - King Maker, King Maker II, King Maker IV, King Maker V

King Maker III (Chinese: 全民造星III) is a 2020 Hong Kong survival reality show on ViuTV as third season of King Maker series, accepting both male and female debuted artists or appearing in TV show before as contestants. The contestants include former girl group As One member Kira Chan (Wai Suen), boy group E-kids member Alan Lam, actor Zeno Koo, singers Mischa Ip and Karen Kong. It aired from 2 November to 26 December 2020, with Ben Chiu being the champion, Kira Chan being the first runner-up, Ansonbean being the second runner-up, and Cloud Wan receiving the most votes by audiences in final.

== Aftermath ==
Eight contestants from the competition, including Chiu, Kira Chan, Ansonbean, Manson Cheung, Wan, Chase Chan (CY), Koo and Terence Ng, debuted as soloists after the competition. Ip, who debuted in 2013, gained popularity after the show and saved her music career.

Two contestants from the competition, Gloria Cheung and Alina Lee, signed to ViuTV after the competition.
