= King Maker II =

Hong Kong reality TV show

- Genre: Reality, survival competition
- Opening theme: 前傳
- Original language: Cantonese
- No. of episodes: 49

Production
- Running time: 60 minutes Final: 150 minutes

Original release
- Network: ViuTV
- Release: September 30 – December 6, 2019

Related
- Good Night Show - King Maker, King Maker III, King Maker IV, King Maker V

King Maker II (Chinese: 全民造星II) was a 2019 Hong Kong survival reality show on ViuTV as the second season of the King Maker series, accepting only male contestants, with members of the boy group Mirror also being contestants. It aired from 30 September to 6 December 2019, with Phoebus Ng being the champion, MC Cheung being the first runner-up, and Oscar Lee being the second runner-up.

Three of the contestants, Ng, George Au and Marco Ip, signed to ViuTV after the show, and formed a boy group called P1X3L in 2021. Cheung, and three other contestants Mike Tsang, Eagle Chan and Aiden Hung, also debuted as soloists after the competition.
