= Sica Ho =

Hong Kong singer (born 2000)

- 何洛瑤
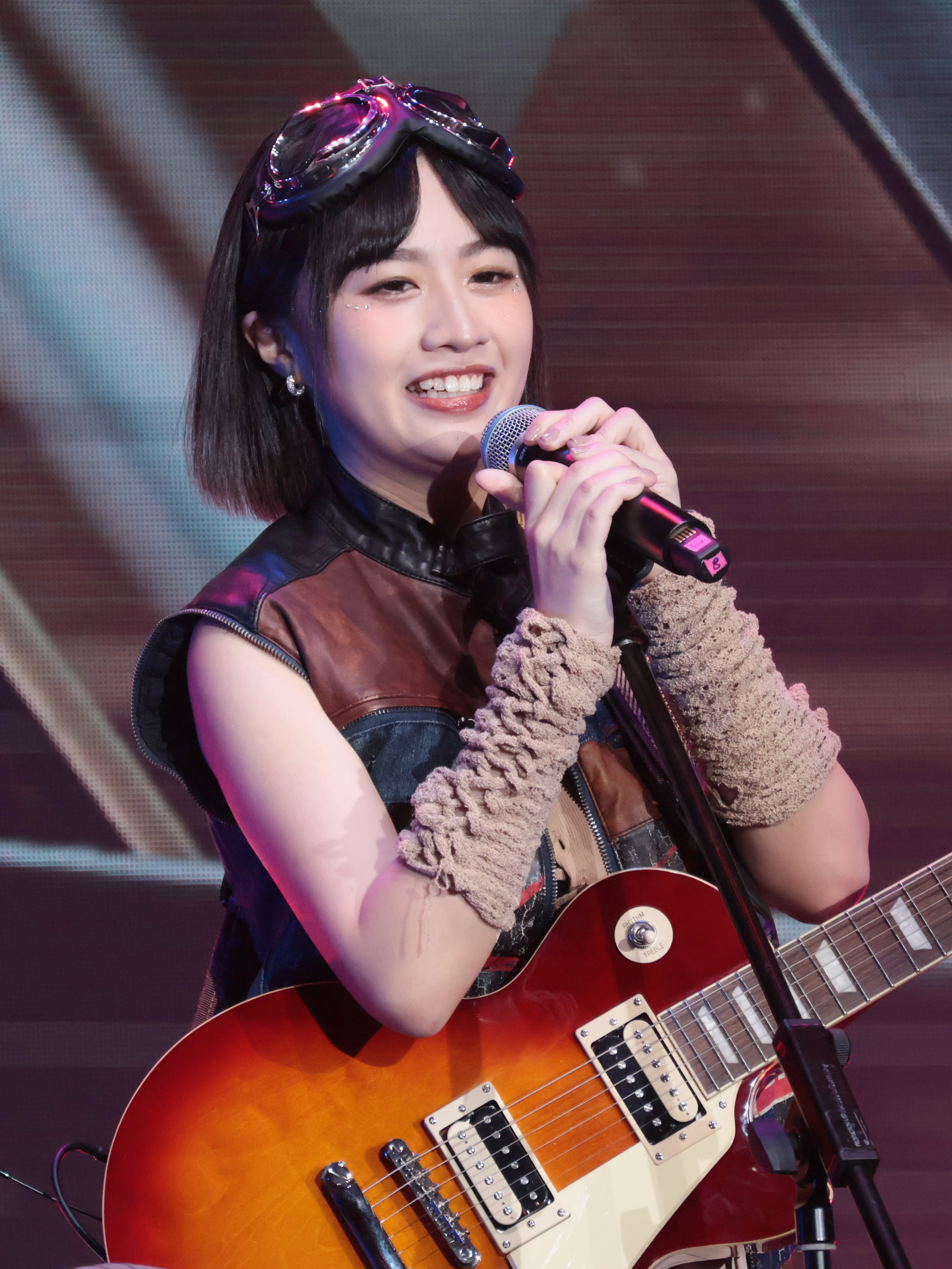
- Ho in April 2024
- Born: Ho Lok-yiu; 24 May 2000 (age 25); Hong Kong
- Education: Hong Kong Baptist University (AD)
- Occupations: Actress; Cosplayer; Singer
- Agent: MakerVille
- Musical career
- Years active: 2021–present

Jessica Ho Lok-yiu (Chinese: 何洛瑤; born 24 May 2000), known professionally as Sica, is a Hong Kong singer, actress, and cosplayer. She was also one of the top 40 contestants on ViuTV reality talent contest programme King Maker IV.

== Biography ==
Sica was born on 24 May 2000. She became obsessed with Japanese anime and pop culture after watching Attack on Titan when she was studying in secondary school. Sica began to cosplay different anime characters, such as K-On!’s Yui Hirasawa and Cardcaptor Sakura’s Sakura Kinomoto, and ran a cosplay-themed Facebook fanpage called Casi's Planet. Sica later attended Hong Kong Baptist University and obtained an Associate Degree of Arts in visual arts. She worked at a maid café after her graduation.

In 2021, Sica auditioned for ViuTV's reality talent contest King Maker IV and was enlisted as one of the final 96 contestants. She received public attention after winning against YouTuber Jackie Lau in the preliminaries and was sorted to Team B, mentored by professional actor Joey Leung. Her performance in the subsequent rounds received widespread acclaim from the mentors, adjudicators and general public. Leung even recruited her to cast his latest theatre play War of Tung Choi Guys: Spiced Up Edition. Ho was signed to ViuTV and appeared on its music variety show Youngster Show Time.

== Discography ==
=== Singles ===
| Year | Title | Original Title | Note |
|---|---|---|---|
| 2023 | "Weathering with Me" | 天氣之女 | |
| 2023 | "be friend ok?" | —N/a | |
| 2023 | "Until We Meet Again" | 再見有時 | |
| 2024 | "Menstrual pain is inferior to my heartache" | 經痛不及我心痛 | |

== Filmography ==
=== Film ===
| Year | Title | Role | Notes |
|---|---|---|---|
| 2024 | The Lyricist Wannabe | Creamy | |

=== Television ===
| Year | Title | Role | Notes |
|---|---|---|---|
| 2022 | Lovesignal | Courier | Cameo |
| 2022 | Into the Wild | Chan Sze Wing (陳思穎) | Guest role |
| 2023 | Beyond the Common Ground | Coco Ko (高善雯) | Main role |
| 2024 | The Money Game | Yanny Chan (陳泳思) | Main role |
| 2024 | The Floating Generation | Faye Chui (徐頌恩) | Main role |

=== Variety show ===
| Title | Chinese title | Year | Role | Network | Notes |
|---|---|---|---|---|---|
| King Maker IV | 全民造星IV | 2021 | Contestant | ViuTV | Contestant no.12 |
| Chill Club Song Promotion | Chill Club 推介 | 2022 | Host | ViuTV | |
| MM730 – Share Hall | MM730 – 男女自然觀察學會 | 2022 | Host | ViuTV | |
| Master & Fire Cheer You Up | 瘋火與膠七 | 2022 | Host | ViuTV | |
| International Markets for Sisters | 姊妹們的國際市場 | 2022 | Participant | ViuTV | |

=== Theatre ===
- War of Tung Choi Guys: Spiced Up Edition (2021)
