= Good Night Show – King Maker =

Hong Kong reality TV show

- Genre: Reality, Survival Competition
- Opening theme: 前傳
- Original language: Cantonese
- No. of episodes: 63

Production
- Running time: 45 minutes Final: 150 minutes

Original release
- Network: ViuTV
- Release: July 15 – October 14, 2018

Related
- King Maker II, King Maker III, King Maker IV, King Maker V

Good Night Show – King Maker (Chinese: Good Night Show 全民造星) is a 2018 Hong Kong survival reality show on ViuTV as first season of King Maker series, accepting only male contestants. It aired from 15 July to 14 October 2018, with Keung To being the champion, Ian Chan being the first runner-up, and Lokman Yeung being the second runner-up.

Two boy groups, namely Mirror and Error, were formed after the competition.
