= P1X3L =

Hong Kong Cantopop boy music group

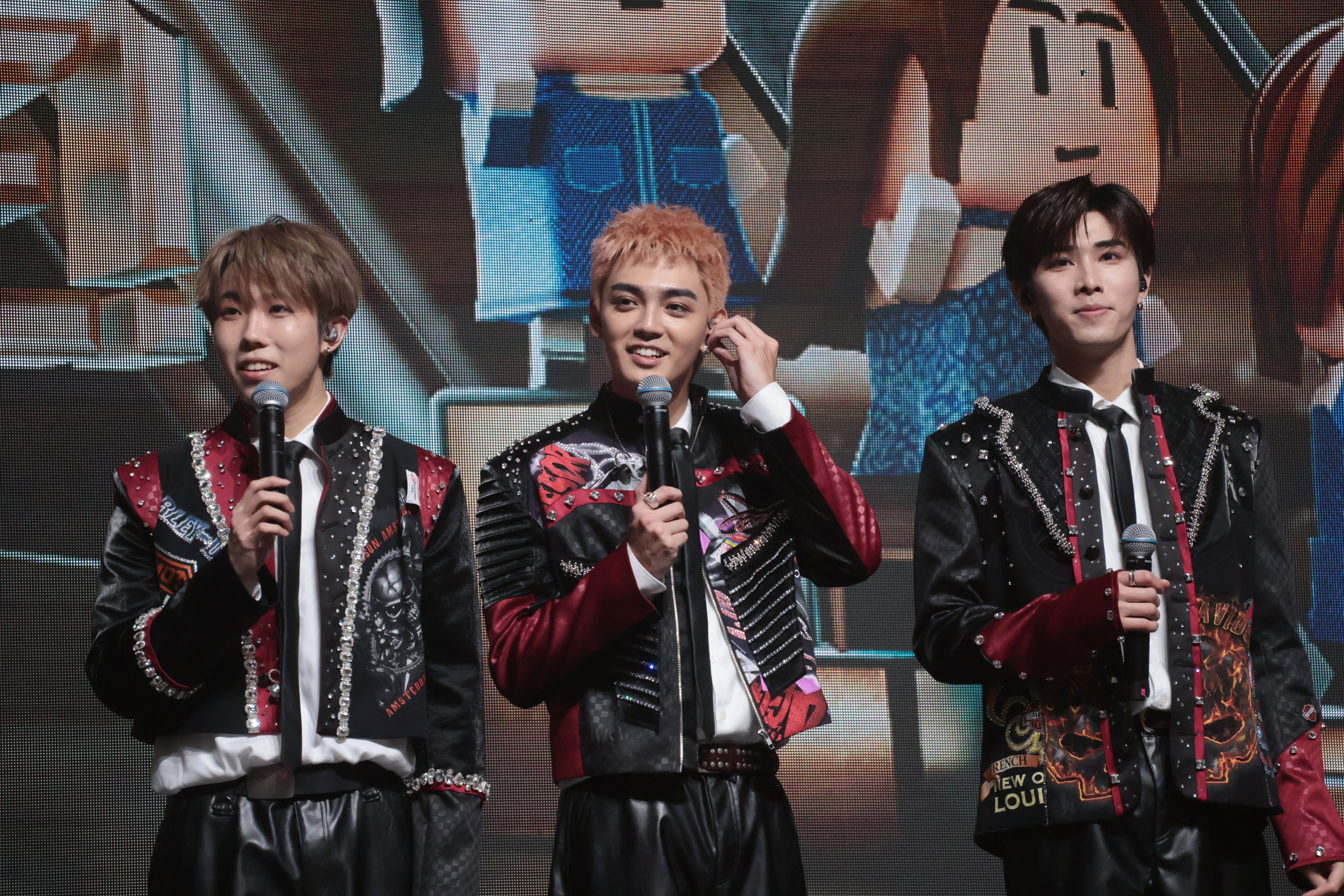
- P1X3L in 2024; L–R: Marco, George, Phoebus

Background information
- Origin: Hong Kong
- Genres: Cantopop; dance-pop
- Years active: 2021–2026
- Labels: Universal (2020-2025); Music Nation Records (2025-2026)
- Members: Phoebus Ng; George Au; Marco Ip

P1X3L (pronounced as Pixel) is a Hong Kong Cantopop boy group formed through ViuTV's reality talent show King Maker II, in 2019. The group consists of three members: Phoebus Ng, George Au and Marco Ip. They debuted on 4 January 2021 with the first single "Braceless".

The group is under a management contract with viuTV / Makerville, while their record label deal is with Universal Music Hong Kong.

Throughout the years, all three members have participated in various types of shows and dramas. In May2024, they held their first concert "P1X3L OMG! Live" in KITEC.

Following the end of contact with Universal Music Hong Kong, P1X3L has been fully managed under Makerville. In July 2026, along with the departure of Marco Ip from Makerville, members declared their individual development in future.

== Members ==
English name	Traditional Chinese Name	Birthday
Phoebus Ng	吳啟洋	8 August 1996 (age 30)
George Au	歐鎮灝	25 October 1998 (age 27)
Marco Ip	葉振弘	24 September 2000 (age 26)

== Discography ==
=== Studio albums ===
Title	Album details	Tracklisting	Ref.
P1X3L	Released: 2 August 2024; Label: Universal Music Hong Kong; Formats: CD, digital download, streaming	Disc 1 (Group Songs): 1. Braceless; 2. Just Lean on Me; 3. Wherever You Are; 4. This is How We Roll (Feat. Jace Chan); 5. Bomb; 6. Next Round (Beatz Version); 7. Can't Stop; 8. Wherever You Are (Winter Version); 9. Next Round (Jøno Version); Disc 2 (Solo Songs): 1. 漸漸地 (lit: Gradually) [Phoebus]; 2. Close Friend [Phoebus]; 3. 海島與少年 (Island Boy) [Marco]; 4. Bad [Phoebus]; 5. 孤獨先生 (lit: Mr. Lonely) [Phoebus]; 6. Joy Boy [Marco]; 7. BF [George]; 8. 半途而廢手册 (lit: Give Up Halfway Handbook) [Marco]; 9. Feed Me [Phoebus]	

=== Singles ===
Title	Year	Album	Ref.
"Braceless"	2021	P1X3L	
"Just Lean On Me"	2021	P1X3L	
"Wherever You Are"	2022	P1X3L	
"Wherever You Are (Winter Version)"	2022	P1X3L	
"Bomb"	2023	P1X3L	
"Next Round"	2024	P1X3L	

=== Collaborations ===
Title	Year	Album	Artists	Notes/Ref.
"This Is How We Roll"	2022	P1X3L	P1X3L feat. Jace Chan	
"Big Heat"	2023	Remembering Leslie	P1X3L, Kira Chan and Kerryta	Leslie Cheung cover
"Hello I'm here"	2023	Sing Outside the Box	P1X3L, Kerryta, Kira Chan and Yeung Tung	

== Filmography ==
=== Television shows ===
Year	Title	Network
2019	King Maker II	ViuTV
2020	Let's Sea	ViuTV
2021	Youngster Show Time	ViuTV
2021	ViuTV 2022	ViuTV
2021	Hard Work Pays Off	ViuTV
2022	Sound Battle	
2022	ViuTV 2023	
2022	HKGNA Music Festival 2022	tvN
2023	Shiny Summer - P1X3L 5G Team Up	ViuTV
2023	ViuTV 2024	ViuTV
2023	MM730 - Internal making of	ViuTV
2024	P1X3L 5G Starry Dragon Year	ViuTV
2024	Sat Night Show	ViuTV

=== Dramas ===
Year	Title	Network
2021	Ossan's Love	ViuTV
2022	I Swim	ViuTV
2023	A Perfect Gentleman	ViuTV
2024	The Money Game	ViuTV

== Videography ==
=== Music videos ===
Year	Title	Artist(s)	Director(s)	Choreographer(s)	Length	Ref.
2021	Braceless	P1X3L	Steven Ng	Tank Leung, Beep Lok	2:59	
2021	Oh My 7 God	OMG (P1X3L) Featuring Master Seven			2:05	Related to TV Show Master Seven EP.6
2021	Just Lean On Me	P1X3L	Bart Pau	Win Win Yeung	3:47	
2022	This Is How We Roll	P1X3L Featuring Jace Chan	Suzanne Lai	Rock Fang, Lok Au	3:34	
2022	Wherever You Are	P1X3L	Wong Shu Yi Zoe, Szeto Wingyin	—N/a	3:57	
2022	Wherever You Are (Winter Version)	P1X3L		—N/a	4:00	
2023	BOMB	P1X3L	KK Szeto, Zoe Wong	Jervin Racan	3:18	
2024	Next Round	P1X3L	Samuel Chan	Jervin Racan	3:54	

== Concerts ==
Year	Date	Name	Venue	Ref.
2024	31 May	P1X3L !OMG Live 2024	Star Hall, KITEC	

== Awards and nominations ==
Award ceremony	Year	Category	Result
Ultimate Song Chart Awards Presentation	2021	Best Rookie Groups	Bronze
Metro Radio Hits Music Awards	2022	Best Groups	Won
Ultimate Song Chart Awards Presentation	2023	My Favourite Group	Final 10
