= Ebenezer School & Home for the Visually Impaired =

School for visually impaired children in Hong Kong

Ebenezer School & Home for the Visually Impaired 心光盲人院暨學校
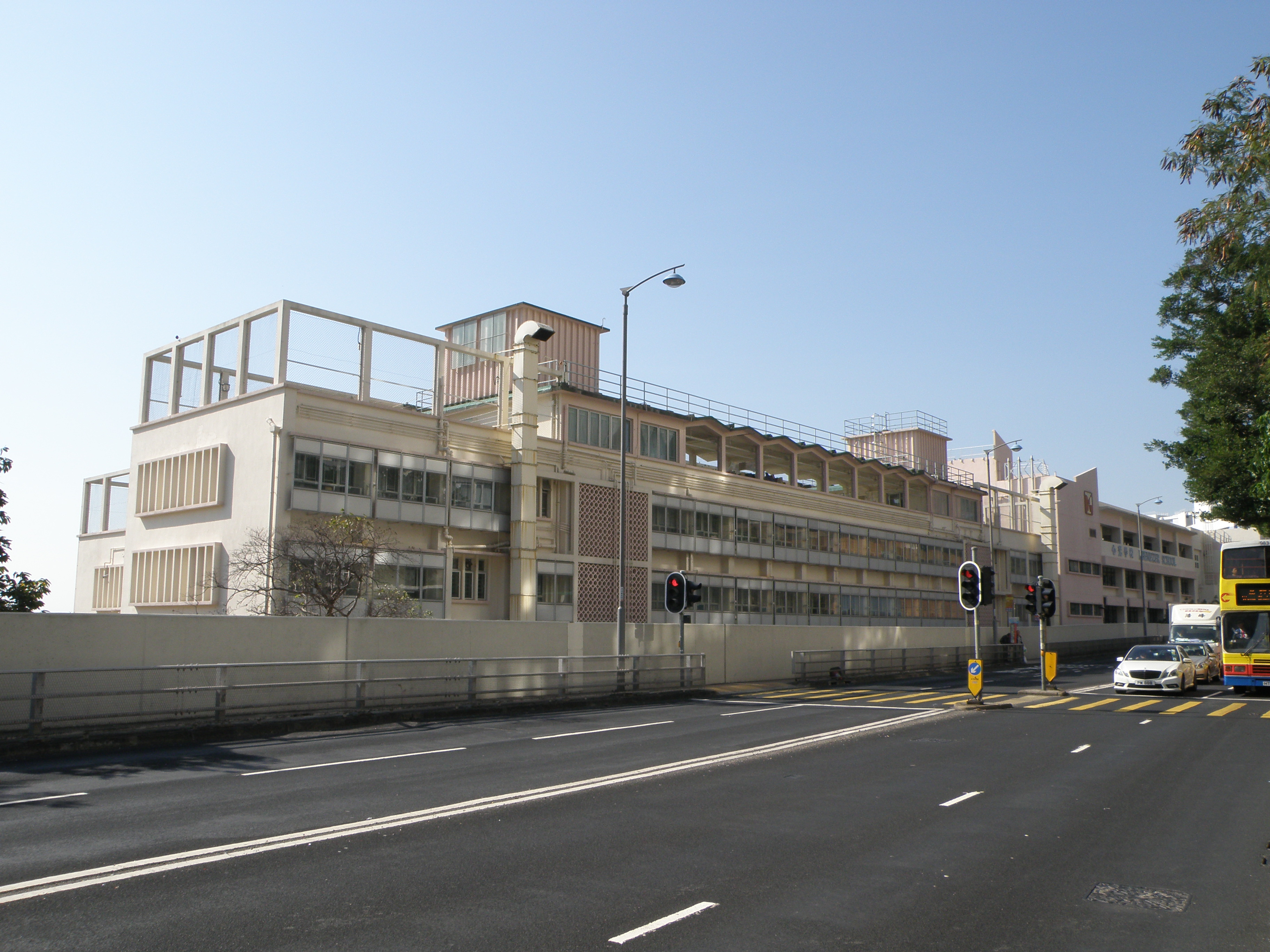
- Ebenezer School in 2014

Location
- 131 Pokfulam Road; Pok Fu Lam; Hong Kong
- Coordinates: 22°15′59.65″N 114°7′56.02″E

Information
- Other name: Ebenezer School (Chinese: 心光學校)
- School type: Aided, Primary and secondary school for the visually impaired
- Motto: Chinese: 自強不息 (Empowerment)
- Religious affiliation(s): Christianity
- Established: c. 1897; 128 years ago
- School district: Southern District
- Supervisor: Brian John Duggan
- Principal: Remy Wong Kwan-bo
- Gender: Co-educational
- Area: 6,420 m^{2} (69,100 sq ft)

Ebenezer School & Home for the Visually Impaired (Chinese: 心光盲人院暨學校), also known as Ebenezer School (Chinese: 心光學校) is a school for blind and visually impaired children in Pok Fu Lam, Hong Kong.

A German missionary, Martha Postler, created the school in 1897. The school's first location was in Western District. Postler, who originated from the Hildesheimer Blindenmission, created the school as she took care of four girls who experienced visual impairment. The school moved into its current site in 1912 and it was officially established the following year.

The school was under the supervision of Church Missionary Society during World War I while the Sisters continued to provide service.
