= Chloe Wong =

Hong Kong singer and actress

- 黃筠兒
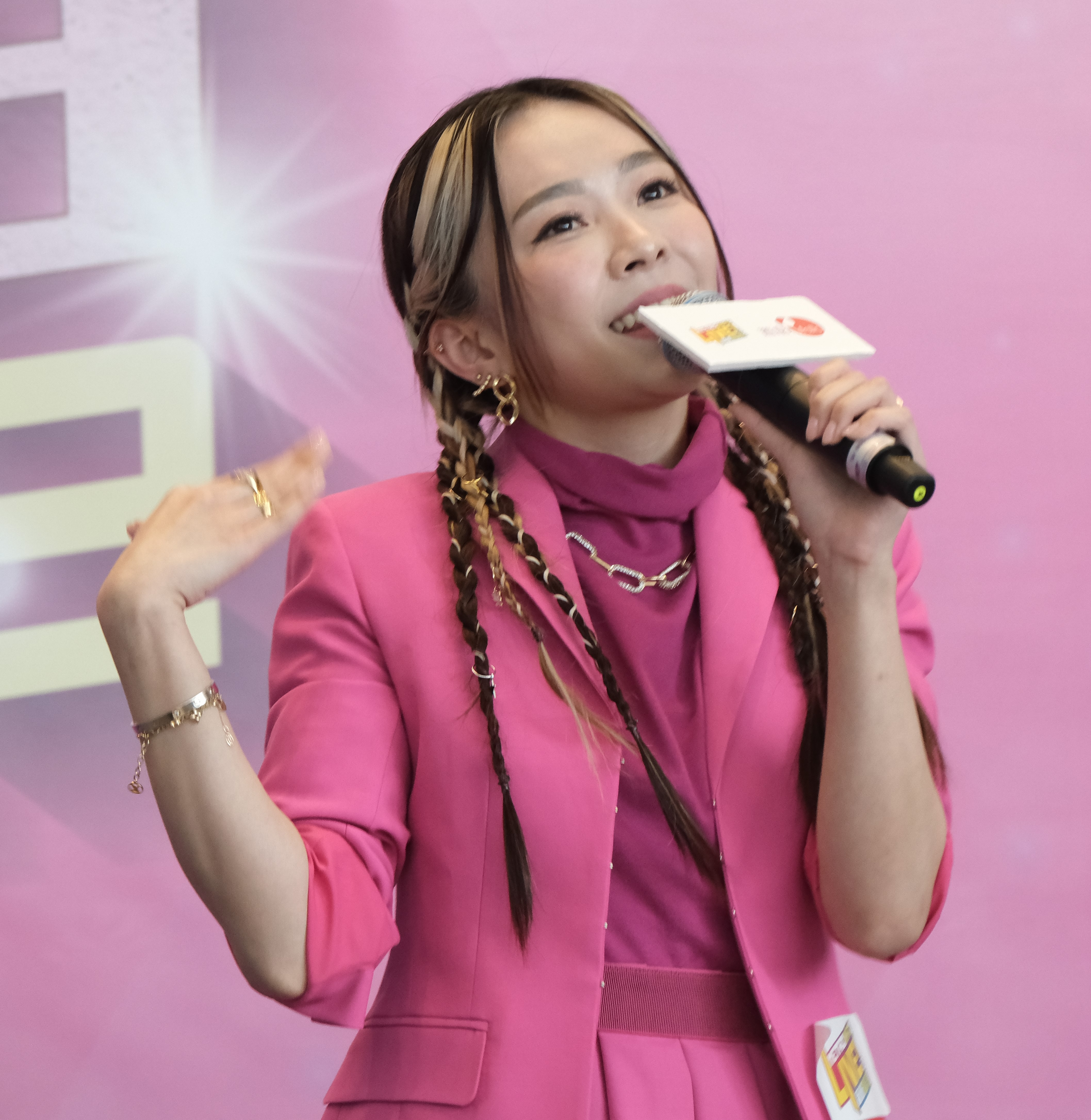
- Wong in 2022
- Born: Wong Kwan-yi (黃均宜); 20 March 1994 (age 32); Hong Kong
- Education: BPP University; University of Huddersfield

Chloe Wong Kwan-yi (traditional Chinese: 黃筠兒; simplified Chinese: 黄筠儿; born 20 March 1994) is a Hong Kong singer and actress, originally known as Wong Kwan-yi (黃均宜), currently an artist under RT Management Limited.

== Summary ==
Wong was born 20 March 1994. Wong has been learning dancing from Rico Tsoi since she was a child, and has served as a dancer in the stage play "Shrimp Daddy" in Hong Kong and Genting. The masterpiece "Happy 520" was launched on Tencent Video on May 1, 2020. In 2021, she participated in the talent show "King Maker IV" hosted by ViuTV and made it to the top 40. She made her debut in the music industry in April 2022, releasing the single "Good Vibes Only".

Wong received a nomination for the Hong Kong Drama Awards.
