= King Maker V =

Hong Kong reality TV show

- Genre: Reality competition
- Opening theme: 前傳
- Original languages: Cantonese, English
- No. of episodes: 36

Production
- Running time: 60 minutes

Original release
- Network: ViuTV
- Release: May 15 – July 1, 2023; Final Competition: July 16, 2023

Related
- Good Night Show - King Maker, King Maker II, King Maker III, King Maker IV, King Maker VI

King Maker V (Chinese: 全民造星V) is a 2023 Hong Kong survival reality show on ViuTV as the fifth season of the King Maker series, accepting only male contestants. This season also recruited participants from Canada and Malaysia. It premiered on May 15, 2023.

Lyman Heung was the champion, KC Wong was the first runner-up and Chan Chun-Hang (Hang Jai) was the second runner-up.
