= Error (Hong Kong group) =

Hong Kong Cantopop boy music group

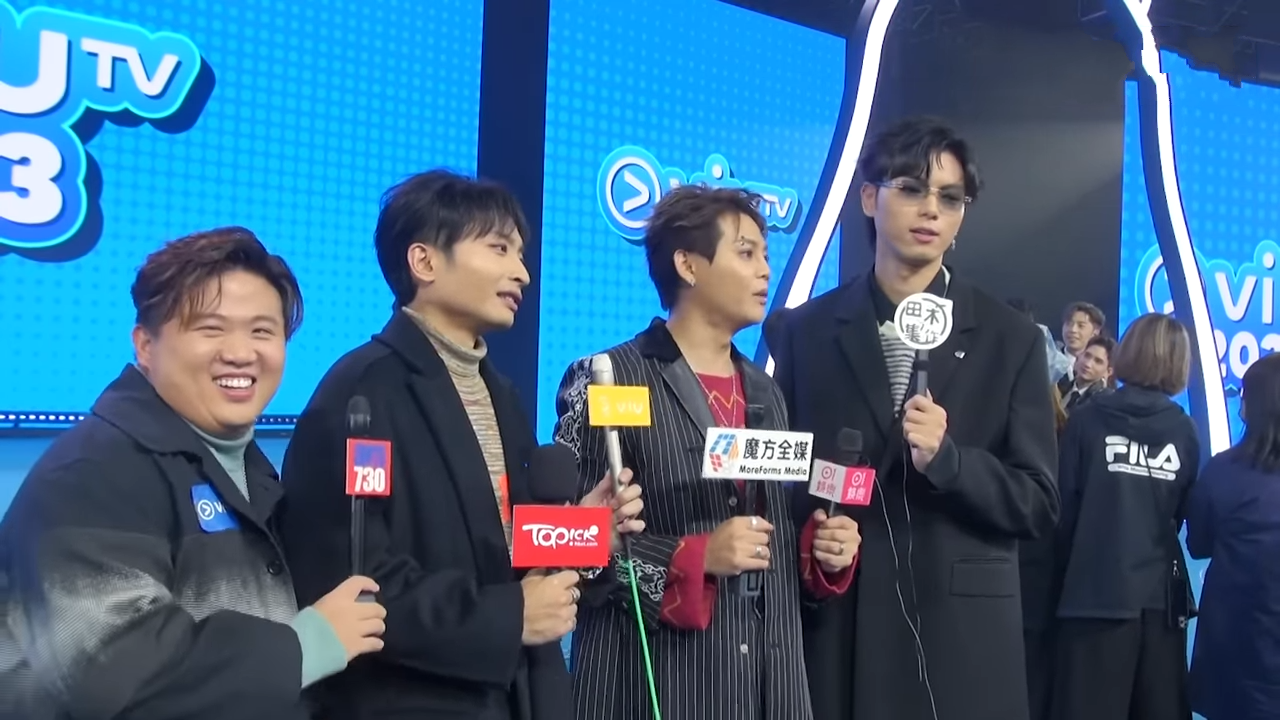
- Error in an event in 2022; Starting from left: Leung Yip, Dee Ho, Poki Ng, Denis Kwok

Background information
- Origin: Hong Kong
- Genre: Cantopop
- Years active: 2018–present
- Labels: Music Nation Records: ViuTV; MakerVille
- Members: Leung Yip (Fatboy); Dee Ho; Denis Kwok (193); Poki Ng

Error (stylised in all caps) is a Hong Kong Cantopop boy band formed through ViuTV's reality talent show Good Night Show – King Maker in 2018. The group consists of 4 members: Leung Yip, Dee Ho, Denis Kwok, and Poki Ng. The group debuted on 2 December 2018 with the single "404".

== Career ==
=== 2018–2020: Formation and early years ===
In July 2018, ViuTV's reality talent competition Good Night Show - King Maker started scouting for potential artistes. After the final, 12 of the 99 contestants were selected by ViuTV to form a boy band Mirror, but the third runner-up Leung Yip (Fatboy) was not selected. Later, the television station published online a series of short videos titled Fatboy's Big Adventure (肥仔大冒險), depicting how Leung Yip recruited his fellow contestants to form another group. The final and seventh episode of the series, published on 2 December 2018, showed Leung Yip, Denis Kwok (193), Dee Ho and Poki Ng declaring the formation of Error. The group demonstrated their comedian position with their debut single "404", a parody of Mirror's "In a Second" (一秒間).

In 2019, the group released two singles, namely "Kill My Manager" (殺死我的經理人) and "We Are Not Broken" (我們不碎). They also hosted their first television show Error Crazy Trip with their manager Ahfa Wong. In October of the same year, Error hosted their first stand-up comedy show in Macpherson Stadium. They released a single called "Handsome Guys" (我們很帥) the following year, which they gained their first peak chart position in RTHK.

=== 2021–2022: Rising popularity ===
Error released two singles, "I Promise" and "We Don't Chok" (我們不Chok) in 2021. They also hosted a reality pageant show, Miss Mask Pageant in March, and each member led a team in the contest. This drew comments from ViuTV's competitor, TVB's deputy general manager Eric Tsang, who dismissed ViuTV for its low viewership and the show for being a niche. On 11 April, before the airing of the final, Denis Kwok sarcastically rebutted Tsang's comments; it became a boost in his popularity, as well as the group's. In May, Error's reality show Error Selfish Project was the rage in Hong Kong, the server of ViuTV's website even faced technical problems during the upload of last episode due to the traffic to the website. They were awarded "Best Groups" at 2021 Metro Radio Music Awards, and "Annual Groups Bronze Award" at Chill Club Chart Award Presentation 21/22.

In 2022, Error released two singles, "Love on Duty" (愛情值日生) and "Never Come Back", and they were awarded "Best Groups" at 2022 Metro Radio Music Awards for two consecutive years.

In 2026, Error made a fresh start following the suspension incident involving 193 and Poki. After one year and five months, the members of Error finally reunited and made their first joint appearance on the show VIURIETY to debut their new song "Inseparable." The core message of the song is that they will never separate.

== Members ==
English name	Chinese name	Member Alias	Birthday	Rank in King Maker
Leung Yip (Leader)	梁業	Fatboy (肥仔)	14 January 1990 (age 36)	4
Denis Kwok	郭嘉駿	193	14 January 1990 (age 36)	Top 40
Dee Ho	何啟華	Dee	10 August 1990 (age 36)	Top 30
Poki Ng	吳保錡	Poki	25 January 1991 (age 35)	Top 20

== Discography ==
Title	Year	Ref
"404"	2018	
"Kill My Manager" (殺死我的經理人)	2019	
"We Are Not Broken" (我們不碎)	2019	
"Handsome Guys" (我們很帥)	2020	
"I Promise"	2021	
"We Don't Chok" (我們不Chok)	2021	
"Love on Duty" (愛情值日生)	2022	
"Never Come Back"	2022	
"Stand Up"Remembering Leslie	2023	
"Under-the-tabel Tunnel" (枱底隧道)	2023	
"We are in Group for Five Years" (四五成群)	2023	
"Supper Saint Cloth" (無敵聖衣)	2024	
"Wild Dancers" (野舞士)	2024	
"Inseparable"(我們不分)	2026	

== Filmography ==
=== Television series ===
Year	Title	Platform	Note
2018	Being An Actor	ViuTV	
2019	Showman’s Show	ViuTV	
2020	We Are the Littles	ViuTV	
2023	A Perfect Gentleman	ViuTV	

=== Variety shows ===
Year	Title	Platform	Note
2018	Good Night Show - King Maker	ViuTV	
2019	Error CNY Show	ViuTV	
2019	Error Crazy Trip	ViuTV	
2019	Error Crazy Trip 2	ViuTV	
2020	Error TV	ViuTV	
2021	Battle Feel	ViuTV	
2021	Error Selfish Project	ViuTV	
2022	Error Vacation	ViuTV	
2023	Shiny Summer - Error Summer Days	ViuTV	
2024	Best Foot Forward with ERROR	ViuTV	
2024	ERROR 10M ROCK n ROAD	MakerVille	
2026	VIURIETY	MakerVille	

=== Films ===
Year	Title	Notes
2020	Hell Bank Presents: Running Ghost	
2021	100 Nichi Go ni Shinu Wani	Cantonese dub
2022	Chilli Laugh Story	
2023	Yum Investigation	

== Awards and nominations ==
Award ceremony	Year	Category	Result
Metro Radio Music Awards	2021	Best Groups	Won
Metro Radio Music Awards	2022	Best Groups	Won
Chill Club Chart Award Presentation	2021/2022	Annual Groups	Bronze
Yahoo Asia Multiverse Buzz Awards	2022	Popular Groups by Votes	Final 3
Yahoo Asia Multiverse Buzz Awards	2022	Local Music Groups	Won
Ultimate Song Chart Awards Presentation	2022	My Favourite Group	Final 5
