= HK Television Entertainment =

Television service operator in Hong Kong

Hong Kong Television Entertainment Company Limited 香港電視娛樂有限公司
- Trade name: ViuTV
- Native name: 香港電視娛樂有限公司
- Industry: Television broadcasting
- Founded: 18 January 2010; 16 years ago
- Headquarters: Unit 899, 8th Floor, KITEC, 1 Trademart Drive, Kowloon Bay, Kowloon, Hong Kong, China
- Area served: Hong Kong
- Brands: ViuTV; ViuTV6
- Parent: PCCW
- Website: www.viu.tv

HK Television Entertainment Company Limited (Chinese: 香港電視娛樂有限公司), trading as ViuTV, is a television service operator in Hong Kong, owned by Hong Kong billionaire Richard Li's PCCW. It operates through its subsidiary PCCW Media, which also owns the IPTV platform Now TV and runs the OTT service Viu.

== History ==
The company was launched in January 2010. HKTVE applied for an over-the-air license for PCCW Limited, which was formally approved by the Hong Kong government on 1 April 2015, coinciding with the announcement that ATV's over-the-air license was revoked on 31 March 2016.

Upon approval, HKTVE planned to launch a Cantonese channel within 12 months and an English channel within two years. The Cantonese service and ATV's replacement, ViuTV, would operate on a 24-hour schedule, while the English channel, ViuTVsix, would operate on a 17-hour schedule. The license was issued for a 12-year term, subject to a mid-term review in 2021.

== Artists ==
All of the artists below were managed by their subsidiary MakerVille, which has also evolved into a TV and movie production company.

=== Groups ===
All of its groups are signed to Music Nation Records, a music company owned by Richard Li.

- Collar
- Error
- Mirror
- P1X3L
- Rover

=== Male soloists ===
- Thor Lok
- Johnny Hui
- Brian Chan
- Colin Chan
- Dixon Wong
- Janzen Tsang
- Vincent Tang

=== Female soloists ===
- Hailey Chan
- Shirley Sham
- Bonde Shum
- Katherine Chan
- Sarika Choi
- Mishy FIsh
- Florica Lin
- Alina Li
- Kathy Wong
- Wayii Cheng
- Gloria Cheung
- Pony Tsoi
- Ranya Lee
- Ah Gi
- Melody
- Yoyo Kot
- Alice Hui
- Sica Ho
- Win Win Yeung
- Ash Chung
