= List of Hong Kong music awards =

This is a partial list of award ceremonies that recognize achievements in Hong Kong's popular music industry. In January 2001, IFPI Hong Kong had considered for a music award that would have similar categories to American Grammy Awards and British Brit Awards, but the event has yet to be held as of 2014.

== The Four Major Awards ==
Each year Hong Kong's four main media outlets; RTHK, TVB, CRHK, and Metro Radio; hold their own music award ceremonies. These are the four music awards that are given the most attention by the media, fans, and record companies.

=== Metro Radio Music Awards ===
Metro Radio Music Awards (新城勁爆頒獎禮) is usually the first of the four major music award ceremonies and is considered "music's first report card". The awards ceremony always takes place on December 26, Boxing Day. Metro Radio is known for giving out the most number of awards, with the number of awards increasing almost every year. In 2000 they gave out 53 awards, but in 2008 they gave out 137 awards. The awards have been held at number of different venues throughout the years. In recent years they have been held at HKCEC Hall 3, but in 2008, it moved to the newly opened AsiaWorld Arena.

=== Ultimate Song Chart Awards Presentation ===
CRHK's music awards (叱咤樂壇流行榜頒獎典禮) is usually the second major music awards ceremony of the year. Awards are determined by airplay on CRHK's FM 90.3 CR2 (based on spins). Spins for songs are only counted if they chart for that particular week (meaning if they make it on the station's weekly Top 20 chart). The awards ceremony are held on January 1, New Year's Day, every year. The awards have been held at number of different venues throughout the years including the Hong Kong Coliseum and Hong Kong Stadium. In recent years, they have been held at HKCEC Hall 3, but in 2007, like Metro Radio Music Awards, the award was held at AsiaWorld Arena instead.

The only awards that are not determined by airplay are the four "My Favourite" awards, which are determined by votes from the public. The process in which votes are collected have changed throughout the years. Currently, the "My Favourite Male, Female, and Group" awards are determined by an official poll online. For the first round of voting, fans get to choose from a large list of nominees. The five artists with the most scores are then picked from the long list of nominees, and then the public gets to choose from the top 5 for the second round of voting. The top 5 nominees for the "My Favourite Song" award is also collected through online votes, but then for the final round votes are collected and counted on site at the awards ceremony.

Due to the fact that CRHK's award ceremonies are determined by airplay, netizens compile the songs played on the station every day. The play counts are then posted on a number of online discussion forums and web sites. While the actual outcome is usually similar to what is compiled by fans online, there are always some differences. But CRHK claims that this is only because the radio station calculate airplay differently from fans.

=== Jade Solid Gold Awards ===
Jade Solid Gold Awards, presented by TVB, is usually the third of the four major music awards held every year. The awards ceremony is generally held in early to mid January. Even though CRHK's music awards are generally given the most hype and attention, while in recent years, TVB's method of determining the winners have been questioned by fans, TVB's "Most Popular Male/Female" and "Gold Song Gold" awards are still seen as some of the most prestigious music awards in Hong Kong. The awards ceremony was held at the Hong Kong Coliseum annually, except for the 2008 edition which was held at Star Hall. Since 2011, the award's venue was moved to TVB City.

=== RTHK's Top Ten Chinese Songs Music Awards ===
RTHK's music awards is usually the last of the four major Hong Kong music awards. The awards ceremony has the longest history out of four major awards, and thus, is one of the most prestigious, giving out its first award in 1978. The awards ceremony gives out a number of big awards every year including the Top 10 Golden songs, the Nation's most favourite male and females, and, most importantly, its Golden Song Award. To qualify for a Top 10 Golden Song award, a song must finish in the top 3 in RTHK's Radio 2 Weekly Countdown which ranks the most popular songs every week. Fans and critics alike both vote for their favourite songs and artists right before the ceremony to determine which awards are given to whom.

Its "Golden Needle" award is generally seen as the most prestigious lifetime achievement award in the Hong Kong music industry. A list of past RTHK Awards can be found here: RTHK Top 10 Gold Songs Awards. Since RTHK is the last of the four ceremonies, it is also the ceremony that awards the 4 Stations Joint Music Awards.

=== Four Stations Joint Music Awards ===
Every year, Hong Kong's four major media outlets also give out four "joint awards" given out by all four stations.

- Outstanding Achievement Award

- Criteria: Artists are given points based on their chart performance at all four media stations. An artist is given 1 point if his/her/their song places 10th on a song chart, 2 points if it places 9th, 3 points if it places 8th, and so on. The top three artists that accumulate the most points are then given Gold, Silver, and Bronze awards. Only artists that have debuted within the last three years are considered for the award.

- Album Award

- Criteria: Awards are determined based on the same point system used for the "Outstanding Achievement Award". The award is given to the album that accumulates the most points from its radio singles (also known as "plugs" in Hong Kong). The award is given to the artist and producer(s) of the album.

- Song Award

- Criteria: Awards are determined based on the same point system as the previous two awards. The award is given to the song that accumulates the most points from all four stations. It is awarded to the composer, lyricist, and artist of the song.

- Media Award

- Criteria: The award is given to the artist, composer, and lyricist that wins the most awards at the four major music awards. Therefore it is always awarded at the last of the four major awards ceremonies. Special awards such as TVB's "Charity Award" are not counted though.

== Other award ceremonies ==
- CASH Golden Sail Music Awards

The only music awards based purely on quality, these awards are given by the "Composers and Authors Society of Hong Kong Ltd."

- IFPI Music Sales Awards (IFPI香港唱片銷量大獎)

These awards are given out by the International Federation of the Phonographic Industry. The awards are usually based on album sales of both local and international music, but after four major record labels withdrew from IFPI in August 2008, almost all of the awards are given to local record companies. The awards ceremony was originally called the Hong Kong Gold Disc Award Presentation or Hong Kong Gold Record Awards, and was first presented in 1977. It was later renamed the IFPI Hong Kong Top Sales Award or IFPI Hong Kong Record Sales Awards until it ended in 2017.

- Roadshow Music Awards

This award ceremony is organized by Hong Kong outdoor media provider RoadShow. Since 2006, it has been held in January of each year. It has been suspended since 2009.

- Metro Radio Mandarin Hits Music Awards (新城國語力頒獎禮)

The Metro Radio Mandarin Hits Music Awards Ceremony was hosted by Hong Kong Metro Broadcast Corporation. It started in August 2002 and ended in 2015. The awards ceremony is usually broadcast on Metro Info (新城知訊台), TVB Wireless Music (TVB音樂台) and J2 Music (J2音樂台). It is the only awards ceremony in Hong Kong specifically for Mandarin songs, and is mostly held in July and August.
