= ViuTV =

- Logo of ViuTV
- Country: China
- Broadcast area: Hong Kong; Macau

Programming
- Languages: Cantonese and English
- Picture format: 1080i HDTV

Ownership
- Owner: PCCW
- Parent: HK Television Entertainment
- Sister channels: ViuTVsix

History
- Launched: 31 March 2016; 10 years ago (Test transmission, Now TV); 2 April 2016; 10 years ago (Test transmission, DTT); 6 April 2016; 10 years ago (Official launch)
- Replaced: ATV Home (DTT service)

Links
- Website: viu.tv

Availability

Terrestrial
- Digital TV (Hong Kong): Channel 99 (HD)
- Digital TV (Macau): Channel 99 (HD)

Streaming media
- Viu.tv: Watch live (Hong Kong only)

ViuTV is a Hong Kong general entertainment television channel operated by HK Television Entertainment (HKTVE), whose parent company PCCW also operates the IPTV platform Now TV and the media streaming service Viu. It is privately owned and is therefore funded entirely by advertising. The channel serves as a free-to-air syndicator for television programmes of Now TV. Its sister station is the English-language channel ViuTVsix. The boy band Mirror became known following the ViuTV's talent show Goodnight Show - King Maker.

In 2020, ViuTV had a reach of four million audiences.

== History ==
=== Hong Kong Television Broadcasts ===
ViuTV first began trial broadcasting on now TV channel 99 on 31 March 2016. On 2 April 2016, it took over the multi-band digital broadcast spectrum vacated by ATV after ATV ceased broadcasting.

Since ViuTV, ViuTVsix, and digital channel 81 (Jade Channel) use the same multi-band network for broadcasting, if viewers can receive the signal of digital channel 81 (Jade Channel) through a digital television or digital set-top box, they only need to rescan the channels to watch the new free-to-air channel 99. Therefore, when channel 99 was launched, its coverage rate of atmospheric radio waves in Hong Kong was the same as that of digital channel 81, reaching 99% of the population.

In addition, viewers who watch via now TV set-top box do not need to search for channels again; they can simply select channel number 99 to watch.

=== Macau Television Broadcast ===
Because ViuTV needed to take over the multi-band digital broadcast spectrum freed up by Asia Television's termination of broadcasting, it would not be able to receive the signal until midnight on April 2, 2016, when it officially began transmitting atmospheric radio waves. The program versions and the official broadcast time were the same as in Hong Kong.

Since ViuTV, ViuTVsix, and digital channel 81 (Jade Channel) use the same multi-band network for broadcasting, viewers who can receive the signal of digital channel 81 (Jade Channel) through a digital television or digital set-top box only need to rescan the channels to watch the new free-to-air channel 99. Therefore, when channel 99 was launched, its coverage rate of atmospheric radio waves in Macau was the same as that of digital channel 81, reaching 99% of the population.

Although Macau viewers can watch ViuTV and ViuTVsix programmes on television, the live TV broadcasts and programmes on the mobile app are only available in Hong Kong. Therefore, if Macau viewers wish to rewatch these programmes, they can watch and stream ViuTV's original programmes on ViuTV's overseas YouTube channel, "ViuTV World" (most programmes are available for streaming a week after their television premiere).

=== China Mainland Broadcasting ===
Compared to ATV before it took over the spectrum, ViuTV currently has no plans to launch in Guangdong Province, China, and does not currently offer any legitimate online channels for watching ViuTV's original programmes in mainland China. Only some viewers in Guangdong use their own antennas or set-top boxes to watch ViuTV programmes. The drama series "The Bridge of Sighs," co-produced with Youku, is one of the few ViuTV original programmes that has been officially launched in mainland China.

=== Overseas broadcast ===
Since ViuTV launched, Fairchild Television in Canada has begun airing some ViuTV programmes, such as parts of the talk show "Late Night Series," and in 2021, it also aired reality shows "Mirror," "King Maker IV," and "God's Leading Lady," as well as the music program "Chill Club." In October 2021, it also aired the popular drama series "Ossan's Love" during prime time from Monday to Friday, and during the airing of "Ossan's Love," it offered ViuTV collectible gifts through a prize game.

In December 2021, ViuTV's popular drama "Ossan's Love" premiered on KTSF26 in the United States during weekday prime time.

=== Official website and application ===
ViuTV offers an official website (archived) and an official mobile application (marked in blue) that provides live streaming of all programmes. All programmes can be uploaded within hours of each episode's broadcast, allowing for free full-length viewing. ViuTV's acquired programmes typically offer a 180-day viewing period due to broadcasting rights restrictions (some acquired programmes may have shorter viewing periods; Now News programmes have a 90-day viewing period). ViuTV's own productions do not have a viewing period (except for "Smart Money" and "Happy Kids").

Some live broadcasts (such as "Smart Money" (before 24 January 2020, now only available for 7 days), news reports, and trading sessions) and programmes with copyright restrictions (such as RTHK programmes, Japanese dramas, and purchased programmes rebroadcast outside of prime time) will not be available for rewatch. During the 2016 UEFA European Championship, the ViuTV official website and app suspended live television broadcasts; viewers could only watch the matches via digital television or Now broadband TV decoders.

The talk show "True PK" contains a large amount of profanity and vulgar language in its first episode. Therefore, in addition to being designed as a guide for parents of children with pregnancies involving pornography, the content has been filtered to meet television broadcast standards. Both the television version and the unfiltered version can be viewed in their entirety on the official website and mobile application, making it ViuTV's first program to offer both online and television versions.

The live stream and services are limited to Hong Kong. For Southeast Asian and Middle Eastern countries (including Singapore, Malaysia, Indonesia, Philippines, Thailand, Myanmar, UAE, Bahrain, Egypt, Jordan, Kuwait, Oman, Qatar, and Saudi Arabia), viewers can rewatch ViuTV dramas, some variety shows, and talk shows through "Viu (Yellow Viu)". Taiwanese viewers can rewatch some programmes through Taiwanese OTT platforms (such as LiTV, KKTV, LINE TV, etc.). Other overseas viewers can rewatch some programmes through the YouTube channel "ViuTV World", or watch highlights on ViuTV's official Facebook, Instagram, and YouTube channels.

The official website and app previously offered a "Read TV" section (which was discontinued and cancelled on 3 April 2017), and instead, articles introducing the day's broadcast programmes and program previews were uploaded to the official Facebook page.

From June 2018, the official website underwent a redesign, primarily involving changes to the webpage design, while the content remained largely the same.

From 1 May 2021, the official website tightened restrictions on program rewatching functionality. Only users who registered as free members on the official website could continue watching all programmes; unregistered users could only watch the first three episodes and any new episodes airing within seven days of their broadcast.

== Notable shows from ViuTV ==
=== Survival reality shows ===
King Maker series:

- Goodnight Show - King Maker (2018)
- King Maker II (2019)
- King Maker III (2020)
- King Maker IV (2021)

=== Music shows ===
- Chill Club (2019–present)

==== Music awards ====
- Chill Club Awards (2021–present)

=== Variety shows ===
- Mirror Go (2018)
- Error: Crazy Trip (2019)
- be On Game (2020)
- Mountain Girl (2020)
- Error: Selfish Project (2021)
- Battle Feel (2021)
- Be a Better Mirror (2021)
- The Investigations of Hong Kong Secrets (2021)
- Be On Game season 2 (2021)
- The Finite Adventure Crew (2023)

=== Talk show ===
- Talker - Helmet Intercom (2016–2023)

=== Dramas ===
- We Are The Littles (2019)
- Leap Day (2020)
- Ossan's Love HK (2021)
- In Geek We Trust (2022)
- We Got Game (2022)
- Left On Read (2023)
- Sparks (2023)
- Business Proposal (2023)
- What if (2025)
- Uncle Mum (2025)
- Where is My Fifteen Minutes (2025)

== Other ==
- Travel_with_Rivals (2016)
