= Jeremy Lee (singer) =

Hong Kong singer (born 1995)

- 李駿傑
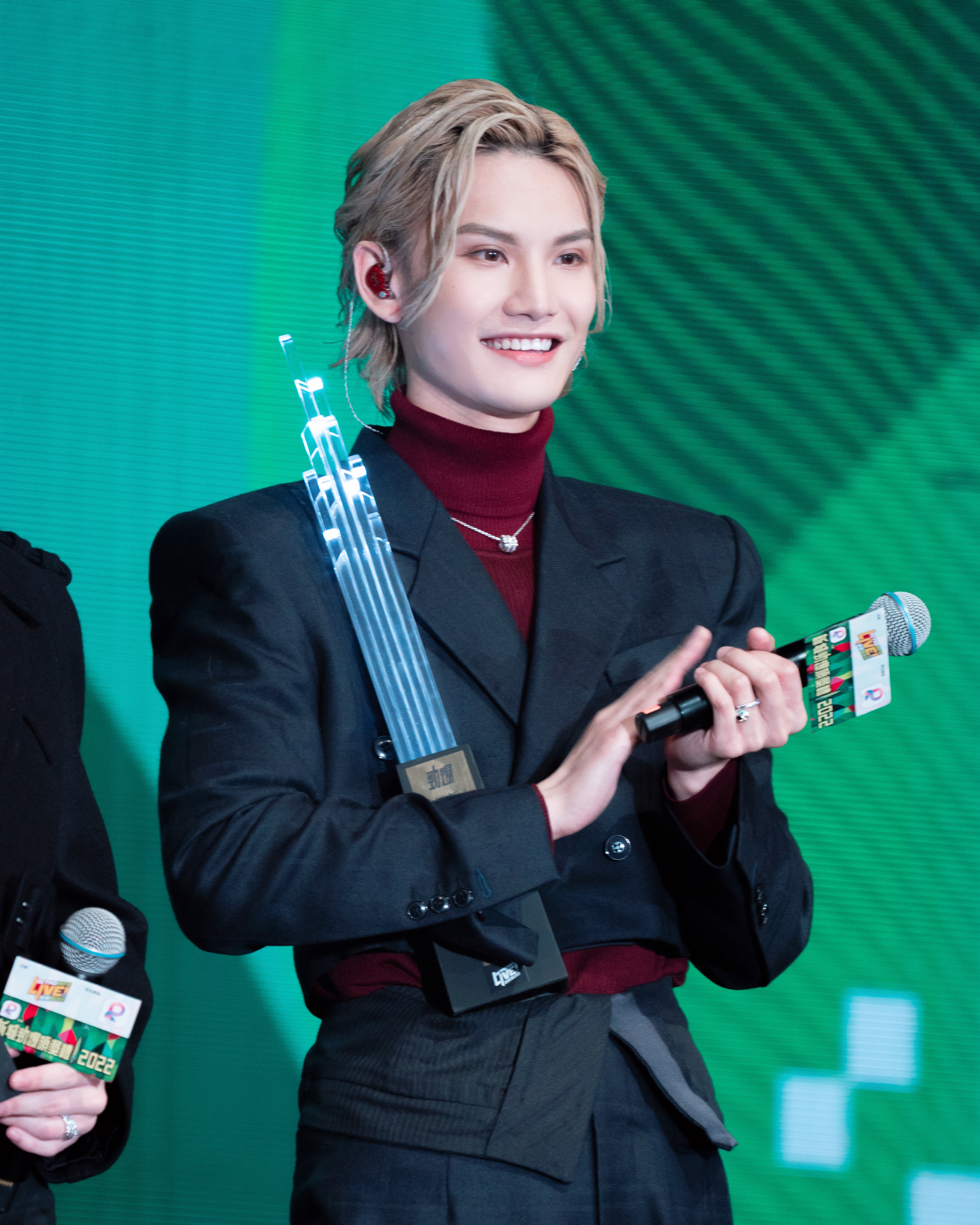
- Born: 8 September 1995 (age 30); British Hong Kong
- Occupations: Singer; actor
- Years active: 2018–present
- Agent: Makerville
- Height: 1.84 m (6 ft 1/2 in)
- Musical career
- Genres: Cantopop; pop; dance pop
- Instrument: Vocals
- Label: Music Nation
- Member of: Mirror

Chinese name
- Traditional Chinese: 李駿傑
- Simplified Chinese: 李骏杰
Transcriptions
Standard Mandarin
- Hanyu Pinyin: Lǐ Jùnjié
Yue: Cantonese
- Jyutping: lei^{5} zeon^{3} git^{6}

Jeremy Lee Chun-kit (Chinese: 李駿傑; born 8 September 1995), is a Hong Kong singer, dancer, actor, and member of Hong Kong boy group Mirror. In 2022, he made his solo debut with the single "Half".

== Career ==
=== 2018–present: Mirror ===
In 2018, Lee competed in the reality television show Good Night Show King Maker created by ViuTV. Lee was initially criticised by netizens for having a Korean style and lacking unique personalities. He managed to advance to the final 10 and finished at ninth overall. In November 2018, Lee made his debut as a member of the boy music group Mirror with their debut single "In a Second" (一秒間).

Lee made his acting debut in the 2018 television series Being An Actor. He has a supporting role in the spin-off drama Showman's Show. Lee portrays Chris 3 in the 2020 youth sport drama We are the Littles.

Lee released an unofficial solo song "Dream Words" (夢言) on 1 June 2021 on his own YouTube channel. His fans, named unicorns, spent thousands of HK dollars to promote the song at various bus stops. They also organised an advertisement campaign, and art exhibition at the Jao Tsung-I Academy, purchasing various billboards at prime locations and decorating public buses with Lee's pictures for his twenty-sixth birthday.

On 12 May 2021, Lee opened another YouTube channel, named "Dragon and Piglet" (巨龍與豬仔 Stanley & Jeremy) together with Stanley Yau, a fellow member of Mirror.

=== 2022–present: Solo activities ===
On 22 February 2022, Lee made his solo debut with the single "Half" (半). On 18 July 2022, Lee released his second single, "Nine" (九). On 27 October 2022, Lee released his third single, "Apollo" (阿波羅). At the Ultimate Song Chart Awards Presentation 2022, Lee won the Best Male Newcomer Gold Award.

On 6 March 2023, Lee released his fourth single, "Closer".

On 5 May 2023, along with Jer Lau of Mirror, Lee performed a duet version of Lau's solo song "Stellar Moments of Humankind" on the popular YouTube channel "The First Take" The duo becomes the second and third artist of Hong Kong to be featured on the channel.

On 28 August, Lee released his fifth single, "Fever". The single is produced by T-Ma.

On 30 August 2023, Lee held his debut solo concert MOOV LIVE Jeremy at the Hong Kong Convention and Exhibition Centre.

On 20 March 2024, Lee co-headlined the 903 concert LAVA alongside Gin Lee, Jay Fung, and Fatboy from Error. On 5–6 November, Lee co-headlined the concert Matchical alongside Mirror members Stanley Yau and Jer Lau, and members from girl group Collar.

On 13 and 16 February 2025, Lee co-leadlined Katch the Pop with Sunmi and Anson Lo.

== Discography ==
=== Singles ===
==== As lead artist ====
Year	Title	Chinese title	Peak HK chart position
2022	"Half"	《半》	16
2022	"Nine"	《九》	-
2022	"Apollo"	《阿波羅》	-
2023	"CLOSER"	—N/a	
2023	"You First"	—N/a	-
2023	"Fever"	—N/a	-
2023		獨角獸之戀	
2024	"Rise in Love"	唯美本尊	
2024	"TOXIC!"	—N/a	
2024	"Villian"		
2025	"Live"	活	

== Filmography ==
=== Film ===
Year	Title	Chinese Title	Role	Ref.
2024	WE 12	12怪盜	Jeremy	

=== Television series ===
Year	Title	Chinese Title	Role	Note
2018	Being an Actor	做演藝嘅	Champion Au	
2019	Showman's Show	娛樂風雲	Champion Au	
2020	We are the Littles	男排女將	Chris 3	
2020	A Perfect Day for Arsenide	把砒霜留給自己	Fat Zai	Episode 6: Deep Secret

=== Variety show ===
Year	Title	Chinese Title	Note
2018	Good Night Show King Maker	Good Night Show 全民造星	Contestant No. 20 Finished 9th with a total score of 6.0%
2018	Mirror Go	—N/a	
2019	Mirror Go 2	—N/a	
2019	King Maker II	全民造星II	
2021	Battle Feel	考有Feel	
2021	Mirror Euro 鬥 Goal Fun	—N/a	
2021	Be a Better Mirror	調教你MIRROR	
2022	Go! Clean Up Your Mess!	GO！執！事務所	
2023	Shiny Summer - MIRROR+	全星暑假 - MIRROR+	
2023	MIRROR Time	—N/a	
2024	Mirror Chef	—N/a	

== Videography ==
=== Music videos ===
Year	Song	Artist(s)	Director(s)	Choreographer(s)
2022	"半" (lit: Half)	Jeremy Lee	Maggie Leung, Sheng Wong	Maximilian Chan, Oceann Wong
2022	"九" (lit: Nine)	Jeremy Lee	Faith Ma & Tin Tin Po@Sightless Vision	Maximilian Chan
2022	"阿波羅" (lit: Apollo)	Jeremy Lee	Boris Wong	—N/a
2023	"Closer"	Jeremy Lee	Faith Ma@Sightless Vision, Tin Tin Po	Ali@themepark.entertainment
2023	"You First"	Jeremy Lee	Borry Su	—N/a
2023	"Fever"	Jeremy Lee	Borry Su	Tiger Hsu
2023	"獨角獸之戀" (lit: Unicorn's Love)	Jeremy Lee	Ivan Tai	—N/a
2024	"Rise in Love"	Jeremy Lee		—N/a
2024	"Rise in Love"	Jeremy Lee Feat. Serrini		—N/a
2024	"Toxic!"	Jeremy Lee	Borry Su	Charcoal

== Concerts ==
Year	Date	Name	Venue	Ref.
2023	30 August	MOOV LIVE – Jeremy Concert	HALL 5BC, HKCEC	

== Awards and nominations ==
Year	Awards	Category	Works/Nominee	Result	Ref.
2022	Yahoo! Hong Kong Search Awards	Most Search Local Artist/Group	—N/a	Top100	
2022	Yahoo! Hong Kong Search Awards	Top 10 Most Voted	—N/a	Top10	
2022	Metro Radio Hits Music Awards	Most Popular Newcomer	—N/a	Won	
2022	Ultimate Song Chart Awards Presentation 2022	Best Male Newcomer	—N/a	Gold	
2022	Canadian Chinese Pop Music Awards	Most Hit Newcomer	—N/a	Gold	
2023	Chill Club Chart Award Presentation 22/23	Best Male Rookies	—N/a	Gold	
2023	Top Ten Chinese Gold Songs Award	Best Male Rookies	—N/a	Silver	
