= Ossan's Love =

Japanese television drama

- Promotional image for season 1
- Japanese: おっさんずラブ
- Genre: Comedy, BL
- Written by: Koji Tokuo
- Starring: Kei Tanaka; Kōtarō Yoshida; Motoki Ochiai (television special); Kento Hayashi (season 1); Yudai Chiba (season 2)
- Ending theme: "My First Kiss" by Hi-Standard (television special); "Revival" by Sukima Switch (season 1); "Negai" by Sumika (season 2)
- Country of origin: Japan
- Original language: Japanese
- No. of seasons: 3

Production
- Production company: TV Asahi

Original release
- Network: ANN (TV Asahi)
- Release: December 30, 2016 – March 1, 2024

Ossan's Love (Japanese: おっさんずラブ, Hepburn: Ossan zu Rabu; lit. 'Middle Aged Man's Love') is a Japanese television drama produced by TV Asahi. The series follows Soichi Haruta, a romantically unsuccessful office worker whose male boss and roommate confess their romantic feelings for him. Noted as one of the first Japanese television dramas in the boys' love (male-male romance) genre, Ossan's Love was initially released as a single-episode television special in 2016, which was adapted into a seven-episode television series in 2018. A feature film sequel to the television series, Ossan's Love: Love or Dead, was released in 2019; a second season of the television series titled Ossan's Love: In the Sky aired that same year.

A new season titled Ossan's Love Returns aired on January 5, 2024, with Tanaka, Yoshida, and Hayashi reprising their roles.

== Synopsis ==
Soichi Haruta, a single 33-year-old man, has been unsuccessful in getting a girlfriend. One day, he discovers his boss, Kurosawa, secretly collects images of him and learns that Kurosawa is deeply in love with him. Unsettled by Kurosawa's bold confession and romantic pursuits, Haruta seeks advice from his friends, discovering in the process that his male co-worker is also in love with him. Caught in a love triangle, Haruta navigates through his feelings for his two love interests.

== Cast and characters ==
Soichi Haruta (春田 創一, Haruta Sōichi)
Portrayed by: Kei Tanaka
Musashi Kurosawa (黒澤 武蔵, Kurosawa Musashi)
Portrayed by: Kōtarō Yoshida
Kurosawa is the manager of Haruta's department and is in love with him.
Ryota Maki (牧 凌太, Maki Ryōta)
Portrayed by: Kento Hayashi
Maki is Haruta's 25-year-old roommate who works in the same company under the design department. He is in love with Haruta and becomes protective after discovering Kurosawa is in love with him. In the original 2016 television special, the character was named Yukiya Hasegawa (長谷川 幸也, Hasegawa Yukiya) and was portrayed by Motoki Ochiai.

== Production ==
Ossan's Love was inspired by producer Sari Kijima's experience of being looked after by a female friend while in college, and her desire to explore the subject of romantic relationships between co-workers. Scriptwriter Koji Tokuo noted that rather than writing the series as a moe love affair between men, he instead framed it as a romantic drama that merely features men instead of a male-female couple; consequently, Ossan's Love specifically avoids homophobia or other LGBT-related issues. While Ossan's Love is an original work, Tokuo has noted both shōnen and shōjo manga as among its influences, particularly Marmalade Boy. The series was heavily marketed through social media; "Musashi's Room", an Instagram account featuring in-character posts from Musashi Kurosawa, became widely popular and gained more followers than the series' official account.

Ossan's Love was first broadcast as an hour-long television special on December 30, 2016, as the third part of TV Asahi's "Year-end Strange Love Drama" (年の瀬 変愛ドラマ) series. The program starred Kei Tanaka as Soichi Haruta, Kōtarō Yoshida as Musashi Kurosawa, Motoki Ochiai as Yukiya Hasegawa, and Sae Miyazawa as Asuka Minato. Following positive response from the special, TV Asahi created a 7-episode television series based on the original television special, which was broadcast in 2018. The 2018 series appeared on TV Asahi's Doyō Night Drama (土曜ナイトドラマ; lit. "Saturday Night Drama") programming block. Tanaka and Yoshida reprised their roles, while Kento Hayashi and Rio Uchida replaced Ochiai and Miyazawa, including characters that were in their original roles.

On January 22, 2019, TV Asahi announced that it would produce a second season of Ossan's Love for release in 2019. The second season, Ossan's Love: In the Sky, is a re-imagining of the series that retains Haruta and Kurosawa's characters, as well as the love triangle plot, but is set in an airport and is not connected to the first season's narrative.

== Episodes ==
=== Television special (2016) ===
No.	Title	Written by	Original release date
Special	"Ossan's Love"; Transliteration: "Ossanzu Rabu" (Japanese: おっさんずラブ)	Tōichirō Rutō	December 30, 2016
Soichi Haruta, a single 33-year-old salaryman working at a real-estate office, discovers photos of him secretly taken by his boss, Musashi Kurosawa, to which the latter admits he has been in love. Haruta confides in his friends but discovers that his co-worker and roommate, Yukiya Hasegawa, is also in love with him. Haruta is unsettled by both their romantic pursuits, and after an altercation at the company's Christmas party, he eventually rejects them both. However, during a night out with Asuka, his childhood friend, he realizes his feelings for Hasegawa and later confesses to him.

=== Season 1 (2018) ===
No. overall	No. in season	Title	Written by	Original release date	Japan viewership rating
1	1	"Open the Door!"	Tōichirō Rutō	April 21, 2018	2.9%
2	2	"Stop Fighting"; Transliteration: "Kenka o Yamete" (Japanese: けんかをやめて)	Daisuke Yamamoto	April 28, 2018	4.2%
3	3	"Your Name"; Transliteration: "Kimi no Na wa" (Japanese: 君の名は。)	Yuki Saito	October 23, 2018	3.8%
4	4	"The Third Man"; Transliteration: "Dai-san no Otoko" (Japanese: 第三の男)	Tōichirō Rutō	May 12, 2018	3.5%
5	5	"Can You "Coming Out"?"	Daisuke Yamamoto	May 19, 2018	3.9%
6	6	"Musuko-san o Boku ni Kudasai!"; Transliteration: "Please Let Me Take Care of Your Son!" (Japanese: 息子さんを僕にください!)	Yuki Saito	May 28, 2018	3.9%
7	7	"Happy Happy Wedding!?"	Tōichirō Rutō	June 2, 2018	5.7%

=== Season 2: In the Sky (2019) ===
No. overall	No. in season	Title	Written by	Original release date	Japan viewership rating
8	1	"Attention Please"; Transliteration: "Atenshon Purīzu" (Japanese: アテンションプリーズ)	Tōichirō Rutō	November 2, 2019	5.8%
9	2	"To Avoid Love in the Middle of the Airport"; Transliteration: "Kūkō no Chūshin de Ai o Sakebu" (Japanese: 空港の中心で愛をさけぶ)	Daisuke Yamamoto	November 9, 2019	4.7%
10	3	"Endless Rain"	Yuki Saito	November 16, 2019	3.5%
11	4	"We Can't Ever Hate Each Other"; Transliteration: "Kirai ni Narenai Watashi-tachi" (Japanese: 嫌いになれない私たち)	Tōichirō Rutō	November 23, 2019	4.6%
12	5	"Am I Not Good Enough?"; Transliteration: "Ore ja Dame ka" (Japanese: 俺じゃダメか)	Daisuke Yamamoto	November 30, 2019	4.3%
13	6	"Seven Days with You"; Transliteration: "Ore to Omae no Nanokakan" (Japanese: 俺とお前の七日間)	Yuki Saito	December 7, 2019	4.2%
14	7	"And Then Someone was Gone"; Transliteration: "Soshite Dare mo Inakunatta" (Japanese: そして誰もいなくなった)	Yuki Saito	December 14, 2019	4.3%
15	8	"Merry Christmas from the Heavens"; Transliteration: "Tenkū no Merī Kurisumasu" (Japanese: 天空のメリークリスマス)	Tōichirō Rutō	December 21, 2019	5.1%

== Other media ==
=== Film ===
A film sequel to season 1 of the television drama, Ossan's Love: Love or Dead, was released in theaters nationwide on August 23, 2019. In its opening weekend the film sold 239,000 tickets, for a box office gross of ¥343 million. The film grossed a total of ¥2.65 billion, making it the twelfth highest-grossing Japanese film released in 2019. Several cheer screenings were held throughout the theatrical run.

=== Manga ===
A manga adaptation of Ossan's Love illustrated by Umebachi Yamanaka was serialized in the manga magazine Be Love from 2018 to 2020. The series was collected into four tankōbon volumes published by Kodansha:

No.	Release date	ISBN
1	March 13, 2019	978-4-06-515273-7
2	August 8, 2019	978-4-06-516772-4
3	November 3, 2019	978-4-06-516772-4
4	March 13, 2020	978-4-06-518929-0

=== Remake ===
A Cantonese-language remake of the first season produced in Hong Kong was first announced in February 2021. The remake stars Mirror members Edan Lui and Anson Lo, as well as Kenny Wong. It was later broadcast in Hong Kong on ViuTV beginning June 28, 2021. Episodes 7 to 15 had new content that was not present in the original Japanese version.

A Thai television drama remake that was aired from January 9 and ends on March 24, 2025 consists of 12 episodes. It stars Pirapat Watthanasetsiri, Sahaphap Wongratch and Shahkrit Yamnam. This drama is now available for streaming on Viu and YouTube.

== Reception ==
=== Critical reception ===
Ossan's Love was credited as one of the series that brought interest to the boys' love genre to mainstream audiences outside of anime and manga fans, and was praised in Japan and Hong Kong for its positive portrayal of same-sex couples. The series' popularity is noted as influencing the production of live-action television dramas and films featuring male-male romance, such as Pornographer (2018) on Fuji TV, What Did You Eat Yesterday? (2019) on TV Tokyo, and Cherry Magic! Thirty Years of Virginity Can Make You a Wizard?! (2020) on TV Tokyo, and the live-action film adaptation of The Cornered Mouse Dreams of Cheese (2020). James Marsh from the South China Morning Post gave Ossan's Love: Love or Dead a score of 3 out of 5 stars.

The official guidebook for the first season sold 100,000 physical copies within its first week of sales. During its second week of sales, it sold an additional 56,000 physical copies and became the best-selling official guidebook for a television drama since the 2011 television series Ikemen desu ne.

=== Awards ===
Year	Award	Category	Nominee(s)	Result	Ref.
2018	Confidence Award Drama Prize	Best Drama	Ossan's Love	Won	
2018	Confidence Award Drama Prize	Best Supporting Actor	Kōtarō Yoshida	Won	
2018	Nikkan Sports Drama Grand Prix	Best Series	Ossan's Love	Nominated	
2018	Nikkan Sports Drama Grand Prix	Best Actor	Kei Tanaka	Nominated	
2018	Nikkan Sports Drama Grand Prix	Best Supporting Actor	Kento Hayashi	Won	
2018	Nikkan Sports Drama Grand Prix	Best Supporting Actress	Rio Uchida	Won	
2018	Nikkan Sports Drama Grand Prix	Best Supporting Actress	Nene Otsuka	Nominated	
2018	Television Drama Academy Awards	Best Series	Ossan's Love	Won	
2018	Television Drama Academy Awards	Best Actor	Kei Tanaka	Won	
2018	Television Drama Academy Awards	Best Supporting Actor	Kōtarō Yoshida	Won	
2018	Television Drama Academy Awards	Best Supporting Actor	Kento Hayashi	Nominated	
2018	Television Drama Academy Awards	Best Screenplay	Koji Tokuo	Won	
2018	Television Drama Academy Awards	Best Director	Toichiro Ruto, Daisuke Yamamoto, Yuki Saito	Won	
2018	Television Drama Academy Awards	Special Award	"Musashi's Room" (tie-in Instagram account)	Won	
2018	Tokyo Drama Awards	Grand Prix	Ossan's Love	Won	
2018	Tokyo Drama Awards	Best Actor	Kei Tanaka	Won	
2018	Tokyo Drama Awards	Best Supporting Actor	Kōtarō Yoshida	Won	
2019	Confidence Award Drama Prize	Grand Prize	Ossan's Love	Won	
2019	Elan d'or Awards	New Face Award	Kei Tanaka	Won	
2019	Elan d'or Awards	Producer Award Encouragement Award	Yumiko Miwa, Sayuri Kijima, Yuki Jinba, Chizuko Matsuno	Won	
2019	Nikkan Sports Drama Grand Prix (Spring Drama)	Best Series	Ossan's Love	Won	
2019	Nikkan Sports Drama Grand Prix (Spring Drama)	Best Actor	Kei Tanaka	Won	
2019	Nikkan Sports Drama Grand Prix (Spring Drama)	Best Supporting Actor	Kento Hayashi	Won	
2019	Nikkan Sports Drama Grand Prix (Spring Drama)	Best Supporting Actress	Rio Uchida	Won	
