= Chilli Laugh Story =

2022 Hong Kong film by Coba Cheng

- Promotional poster
- Traditional Chinese: 闔家辣
- Simplified Chinese: 阖家辣
- Literal meaning: Family Friendly
- Hanyu Pinyin: Hé jiā là
- Directed by: Coba Cheng
- Written by: Matt Chow; Coba Cheng
- Produced by: Sandra Ng
- Starring: Ronald Cheng; Gigi Leung; Edan Lui; Sandra Ng
- Cinematography: Jason Kwan; Alan Koo
- Edited by: Curran Pang; Azrael Chung; Alvin Wu
- Music by: Original Score Supervisor: Lincoln Lo Kin
- Production companies: One Cool Film Production; Treasure Island Production Co., Ltd.; Media Asia Film; We Production Co.
- Distributed by: We Distribution; Intercontinental Film Distributors (HK)
- Release date: 14 July 2022
- Running time: 94 minutes
- Country: Hong Kong
- Language: Cantonese
- Budget: HK$11.34 million (US$1.46 million)
- Box office: est. HK$32.61 million (US$4.2 million)

Chilli Laugh Story (Chinese: 闔家辣) is a 2022 Hong Kong comedy film co-written and directed by Coba Cheng, a debutant director. An amusing and sometimes unexpectedly poignant comedy starring Ronald Cheng, Gigi Leung, Edan Lui, and Sandra Ng, it was initially scheduled to release on 1 February 2022, the first day of Lunar New Year, but it was postponed due to COVID-19 and finally released on 14 July 2022.

The film was invited to 21st New York Asian Film Festival, where it had its international premiere on 20 July and won NYAFF Audience Award.

Produced with a budget of HK$11.34 million (US$1.46 million), the film has grossed HK$32.61 million (US$4.2 million) as of 25 September 2022 and currently it is the 4th highest-grossing, Hong Kong-produced film of 2022.

== Synopsis ==
Enterprising college student and music promoter Coba is working from home like everyone else during the pandemic. The would-be comforts of his situation are disrupted by the constant bickering of his eccentric parents (Ronald Cheng and Gigi Leung). After his paying gig suddenly dries up, Coba happens upon an ingenious get-rich-quick scheme that should also distract mom and dad: bottle and sell his mom’s insanely tasty old-school chili sauce. But online demand unexpectedly outpaces supply, and the whole family must band together to continue cornering the market. Their non-stop slapstick shenanigans spice up the classic Chinese New Year comedy formula, producing a brilliant blend of wacky characters and family team-building that is as scrumptiously mouth-watering as the chili sauce recipe itself. (From New York Asian Film Festival)

== Cast ==
- Edan Lui as Cheung Pak Hin/Coba (張柏軒), main protagonist
- Sandra Ng as Wendy Cheung Wai Yi (張惠儀), Coba's aunt
- Gigi Leung as Rita Chan Mei Jing (陳美貞), Coba's mother
- Ronald Cheng as Alan Cheung Kwok Lun (張國倫), Coba's father
- Angela Yuen as Sam Li Kai Wai (李家慧), Coba's girlfriend
- Tony Wu as Wendy's son
- Helen Tam as Wendy's older sister
- Dee Ho as a friend/middle school classmate of Coba's
- Locker Lam as a friend/middle school classmate of Coba's
- Matt Chow as a food expert
- Carl Ng as Arnold, the owner of SugerMama
- Yanny Chan as Arnold's secretary
- Lo Hoi-Pang as a hot dog shop owner

Also featuring cameo appearances by Louis Koo and Kenny Wong as Ah Sun and KK; while Leung Yip, Denis Kwok, and Poki Ng, who are members of Dee Ho's boyband Error, as well as Hui Yin and So Chi Ho, members of the YouTube skit group Trial & Error, appear as customers at the hot dog shop.

== Release ==
The film initially scheduled to release on 1 February 2022 was postponed due to COVID 19 and finally released on 14 July 2022. At the same time, it was invited at the 21st New York Asian Film Festival, where it was screened at Lincoln center on July 20 for its International Premiere, and won the Audience Award. The film was also invited to the 26th Fantasia International Film Festival and was screened on July 31, 2022. Trinity Cine Asia acquired rights for distribution of the film in the United Kingdom and North America. It was released theatrically in the United Kingdom on 15 July and in the United States and Canada on 22 July.

== Reception ==
=== Box office ===
The film held 92 priority screenings in Hong Kong from 1 July to 3 July 2022, and most of the screenings were sold out, with a box office collection of HK$1.15 million.

As of 25 September 2022 the film is the 4th highest-grossing, Hong Kong-produced film released in the year 2022 with gross of HK$32,610,384.

=== Critical response ===
Edmund Lee of the South China Morning Post rated the film with 3.5 out of 5 stars and wrote, "Anyone seeking a window on life for the past two years in post-protest and mid-pandemic Hong Kong – a vaguely depressing experience – could do worse than watch Chilli Laugh Story.". Leslie Felperin of The Guardian rated the film with 3 stars out of 5 and wrote, "The story sort of lollops along like a big friendly dog, following a predictable trajectory of success and failure."

== Accolades ==
| Year | Award | Category | Recipient(s) | Result | Ref. |
|---|---|---|---|---|---|
| 2022 | 21st New York Asian Film Festival | Audience Award | Chilli Laugh Story | Won | |
| 2023 | Hong Kong Film Award | Best New Performer | Edan Lui | Nominated | |
