= Stanley Yau =

Hong Kong singer and actor (born 1990)

- 邱士縉
- Yau in 2026
- Born: 20 August 1990 (age 36); British Hong Kong
- Education: City University of Hong Kong (BSc)
- Occupations: Singer; dancer; actor
- Agent: HKTVE
- Height: 1.83 m (6 ft 0 in)
- Musical career
- Genres: Cantopop; dance pop
- Instruments: Vocals; piano; guitar
- Years active: 2018–present
- Label: Music Nation
- Member of: Mirror

Chinese name
- Chinese: 邱士縉
Transcriptions
Standard Mandarin
- Hanyu Pinyin: Qiū Shìjìn
- Wade–Giles: Chiu Shi-chin
Yue: Cantonese
- Jyutping: Yau^{1} Si^{6} Zeon^{3}

Stanley Yau Sze-chun (Chinese: 邱士縉; born 20 August 1990) is a Hong Kong singer, dancer, actor, and a member of the Hong Kong boy group Mirror. Apart from his group activities, Stanley has starred in television dramas, such as Ossan's Love (2021) and Into the Wild (2022).

== Life and career ==
Yau was born on 20 August 1990 and grew up in Ma On Shan of New Territories, Hong Kong. He has one older brother. He attended Mrs Fung Ping Shan Primary School, Po Leung Kuk Wu Chung College, and graduated from the City University of Hong Kong with a Bachelor of Science in Computer Science. Yau was part of the Chestnuts Dance Crew, choreographing dance covers to popular music. As a member of Chestnuts, Yau also worked as a backup dancer for various singers including Sandy Lam, Aaron Kwok and Pakho Chau.

In 2018, Yau auditioned for ViuTV's reality talent competition Good Night Show - King Maker and finished tenth place, earning him a spot in the twelve-member boy group Mirror. The group debuted on 3 November 2018 with the single "In a Second" (Chinese: 一秒間). That same year, Yau debuted in the comedy drama Being an Actor (2018), portraying Sammy in episode one.

Yau had a larger supporting role in the sitcom Showman Show (2019), continuing his role as a passionate production assistant from Being an Actor. He then starred as Luk Chun in Who Sells Bricks in Hong Kong (2020), Chang Ching-Yao in HBO Asia's Trinity of Shadows (2021), and Louis in Ossan's Love (2021).

In 2022, Yau starred in Into the Wild as Lee Pak, his first leading role. He also played major supporting roles in In Geek We Trust and We Got Game.

Yau made his film debut in the action comedy We 12, which features Mirror in an ensemble cast.

== Filmography ==
=== Television series ===
Year	Title	Chinese title	Role	Network	Notes
2018	Being an Actor	做演藝嘅	Sammy	ViuTV	Cameo appearance
2019	Showman's Show	娛樂風雲	Sammy Chan	ViuTV	Supporting role
2019	Dark City	黑市	Chung, famous celebrity	ViuTV	Cameo appearance (episodes 1, 11)
2020	Who Sell Bricks in Hong Kong	地產仔	Luk Chun	ViuTV	Supporting role
2020	We are the Littles	男排女將	Yau Sze-wai	ViuTV	Cameo appearance (episode 19)
2021	Trinity of Shadows	第三布局 塵沙惑	Chang Ching-Yao	ViuTV	Supporting role
2021	Ossan's Love	大叔的愛	Louis Lui Chun-lam	ViuTV	Major Supporting role
2022	In Geek We Trust	IT狗	Marcus	ViuTV	Supporting role
2022	Into the Wild	野人老師	Lee Pak	ViuTV	Main Role
2022	We Got Game	季前賽	Cheung Chi Leung	ViuTV	Supporting role
2024	The Floating Generation	島嶼協奏曲	Lai Chun Chung	ViuTV	Main ensemble role
2024	My Lovely Liar (HK)	無用的謊言	Lee Man Hong	ViuTV	Major Supporting role
2026	In Geek We Trust 2	IT狗2.0	Marcus	ViuTV	Supporting role
2026	Kidnap Game	—N/a	Andy Wong	Fuji Television, Viu, Channel A	Main role

=== Variety show ===
Year	Title	Chinese title	Role	Network	Notes
2018	Good Night Show: King Maker	Good Night Show 全民造星	Contestant	ViuTV	Contestant No. 1 Finished in 10th place
2018	Mirror Go	—N/a	Cast member	ViuTV	with Mirror
2019	Mirror Go 2	—N/a	Cast member	ViuTV	with Mirror
2019	King Maker II	全民造星II	Contestant and judge	ViuTV	
2019	The Haunted Rooms	入住請敲門	Host	ViuTV	Season four; with Anson Lo
2021	Battle Feel	考有Feel	Cast member	ViuTV	with members of Mirror and Error
2021	Be a Better Mirror	調教你MIRROR	Cast member	ViuTV	with Mirror
2023	Shiny Summer - MIRROR+	全星暑假 - MIRROR+	Cast member	ViuTV	with Mirror
2023–2024	MIRROR Time	—N/a	Cast member	ViuTV	with Mirror
2024	Mirror Chef	—N/a	Cast member	ViuTV	with Mirror

=== Film ===
Year	English Title	Original Title	Role	Notes
2023	Paws of Fury: The Legend of Hank	非常貓狗反轉武林	Jimbo	Cantonese dub
2024	We 12	12怪盜	Stanley	
2025	My Best Bet	祥賭必贏	Ming	
TBA		我未許願先吹蠟燭		

=== Music video appearances ===
Year	Title	Artist	Ref.
2022	"Tree"	Serrini	
2024	"Be kind, rewind"	Sumling	

== Discography ==
=== Singles ===
==== As lead artist ====
Year	Title	Chinese Title	Notes
2022	"Reintroduce"	重新介紹	"Into the Wild" Theme song
2023	"Never Too Late"	來不及	
2024	"Drunk in Love"		
2025	"Endless Game"	無限回合	
2026		二次覺醒	
