= Remembering Leslie =

2023 Cantopop studio album

Studio album by Various Artists
- Released: March 24, 2023
- Studio: Avon Recording Studios
- Genre: Cantopop
- Length: 41:38
- Label: Universal Music Hong Kong
- Producer: Eric Kwok; David Chow; Terry Chui; JNYBeatz; Rock Hill Street

Remembering Leslie (also stylised as REMEMBERING Leslie) is a compilation album released by Universal Music Hong Kong in March 2023, as part of the commemoration of the 20th anniversary of Leslie Cheung's passing. The album featured emerging Cantopop artists interpreting Cheung's classic songs. Commercially, it reached number two on the Hong Kong Record Merchants Association's "Best-selling albums" chart. The release was accompanied by pre-release singles and a live concert titled Reminiscing Leslie Live.

== Background and production ==
In 2023, the world commemorated the 20th anniversary of Leslie Cheung's passing in 2003. Cheung was known as a "cultural icon" in both music and films during his time. In January, Universal Music Hong Kong, the record label to which Cheung joined in 1999, announced their plan to release two special albums as a tribute. One of these albums, titled Remembering Leslie, features new interpretations of Cheung's classic songs performed by emerging Cantopop artists from various record labels. Although the project was initially seen as challenging for the young artists, producer Eric Kwok stated that it was relatively manageable. He noted that Cheung's melodies were not highly complex, allowing sufficient space and easy memorization, while the main difficulty involved scheduling, as the recording had to be completed within a three-week timeframe. Development of the album cover began in October or November 2022. The design incorporates portrait sculptures of Leslie Cheung, intended to evoke a sense of sacredness and intergenerational reverence.

== Release and composition ==
The digital version of the album was released on various streaming platforms on March 24, 2023, followed by the physical album release on March 31, 2023. As part of the album promotion, several tracks were released as pre-release singles. "An Affair," featuring rap lyrics written and performed by Anson Lo, was released on January 20. The lyrics depict a mindset of seeking pleasure and indulging in extramarital affairs without expectation of love. The second single, "Awareness," performed by Mike Tsang and released on February 10, adopts a contemporary electronic style. Its lyrics describe the protagonist in a moment of reflective tranquility, away from the hustle and bustle of life. The third single, "Addicted Beauty," sung by Jasmine Yam and released on February 17, incorporates elements of rock to highlight both the explosive and gentle facets of Yam's vocals. Lyrically, it portrays the heroine's infatuation with her lover, using metaphors that liken the lover's beauty to a poisonous snake, illustrating the intense and entangled nature of their relationship.

The fourth single, "My Life," performed by Gigi Yim and released on February 24, explores the heroine's numerous tribulations of love, expressing appreciation and gratitude for encountering true love. Clarence Hui, the songwriter, personally commented on Yim's performance, praising her "honest...simple approach that still emoti[o]nally moves the wheel of time." The dance track "Miss You Much," performed by the girl group XiX and also released on February 24, was adapted from Janet Jackson's song of the same name (1989) and noted for incorporating "new groove elements" alongside rap sections performed by the group. The final single, titled "Chase," performed by Keung To and released on March 16, preserves the original essence of the classic song despite a new arrangement, without adding rap. Its lyrics depict a protagonist who, having pursued fame and fortune, realizes that love is the utmost priority in life after meeting his soulmate.

Other tracks include "Monica," featuring an "energetic and down-to-earth" band arrangement, with lyrics reflecting the protagonist's memories and regrets after a breakup. "Stand Up" blends rock and electronic elements, while "Stop Fooling Around" incorporates brass instrumentation and evokes a "sensual vibe conveying a brief encounter between lonely souls." Its lyrics portray weariness with a transient romantic lifestyle. In contrast to its original ballad version, "A Man of Intention" presents a "cute and dynamic" reinterpretation. "Countdown with You" incorporates EDM elements, with lyrics counting down to the end of the world. "Greatest Heat" addresses passionate and intense love through a "soulful and rhythmical" approach.

== Promotion and reception ==
On March 3, 2023, Mike Tsang and Jasmine Yam held a busking session in Causeway Bay, performing live versions of their cover songs. On April 1, 2023, Universal Music organized a live concert titled Reminiscing Leslie Live at the Hong Kong Convention and Exhibition Centre, featuring a lineup of artists, including most of those appearing on the album. The album peaked at number two on the Hong Kong Record Merchants Association's weekly "Best-selling albums" chart and remained in the top ten for six weeks.

== Track listing ==
* Tracks 4, 9, 11, and 12 do not have an official English title and are therefore transliterated.

No.	Title	Writer(s)	Artist(s)	Length
1.	"Monica"	Nobody; Yoshiko Miura; Peter Lai	One Promise, Dez Yu	2:38
2.	"Stand Up"	Rick Springfield; Richard Lam	Error	2:47
3.	"Awareness (有誰共鳴)"	Siu Mei; Shinji Tanimura	Mike Tsang	3:12
4.	"Stop Fooling Around (拒絕再玩)"	Kōji Tamaki; Gorō Matsui; Richard Lam	Louise Wong	3:18
5.	"Miss You Much"	James Harris; Terry Lewis; Richard Lam; Aster Lau; Kiele Tang; Vici Chong	XiX	3:22
6.	"Chase (追)"	Dick Lee; Albert Leung	Keung To	5:13
7.	"My Life (今生今世)"	Clarence Hui; James Yuen	Gigi Yim	3:19
8.	"An Affair (偷情)"	C.Y. Kong; Albert Leung; Anson Lo	Anson Lo	3:48
9.	"A Man of Intention (有心人)"	Leslie Cheung; Albert Leung	Yuta, Apple	3:31
10.	"Addicted Beauty (怪你過份美麗)"	Gary Tong; Albert Leung	Jasmine Yam	4:31
11.	"Countdown With You (陪你倒數)"	C.Y. Kong; Albert Leung	JNYBeatz, Rock Hill Street	2:28
12.	"Greatest Heat (大熱)"	Leslie Cheung; Albert Leung	P1X3L, Kira Chan, Kerryta	3:25
Total length:				41:38

== Personnel ==
Credits for Remembering Leslie adapted from AllMusic.

- Apple – vocals
- Kira Chan – vocals
- Leslie Cheung – composer
- David Chow – producer
- Jacky Chui – arranger
- Terry Chui – arranger, producer
- Dez Yu – vocals
- Error – vocals
- Gigi Yim – vocals
- Tin Hang – arranger
- Jimmy Harris – composer
- XiX – vocals
- Liang Yong Jing – arranger
- JNYBeatz – arranger, producer, vocals
- Kerryta – vocals
- C.Y. Kong – composer
- Jun Kung – arranger
- Eric Kwok – producer
- Dick Lee – composer
- Leonaka – arranger
- Terry Lewis – composer
- Cong Li – arranger
- Anson Lo – vocals
- One Promise – vocals
- P1X3L – vocals
- Rock Hill Street – arranger, producer, vocals
- Rick Springfield – composer
- Koji Tamaki – composer
- Shinji Tanimura – composer
- Keung To – vocals
- Gary Tong – composer
- Mike Tsang – vocals
- Louise Wong – vocals
- Nick Wong – arranger
- Jasmine Yam – vocals
- Xu Yuan – composer
- Yuta – vocals
- Zi Jian Zhang – arranger

== Charts ==
=== Weekly charts ===
Chart	Peak position
Hong Kong Record Merchants Association	2

== Release history ==
Release dates and formats for Remembering Leslie
Region	Date	Version	Format(s)	Label	Ref.
Worldwide	March 24, 2023	Standard	digital download; streaming	Universal Music Hong Kong	
Worldwide	March 31, 2023	Standard	CD	Universal Music Hong Kong	
Worldwide	July 5, 2023	Standard	vinyl	Universal Music Hong Kong	
