= Kento Hayashi =

Japanese actor (born 1990)

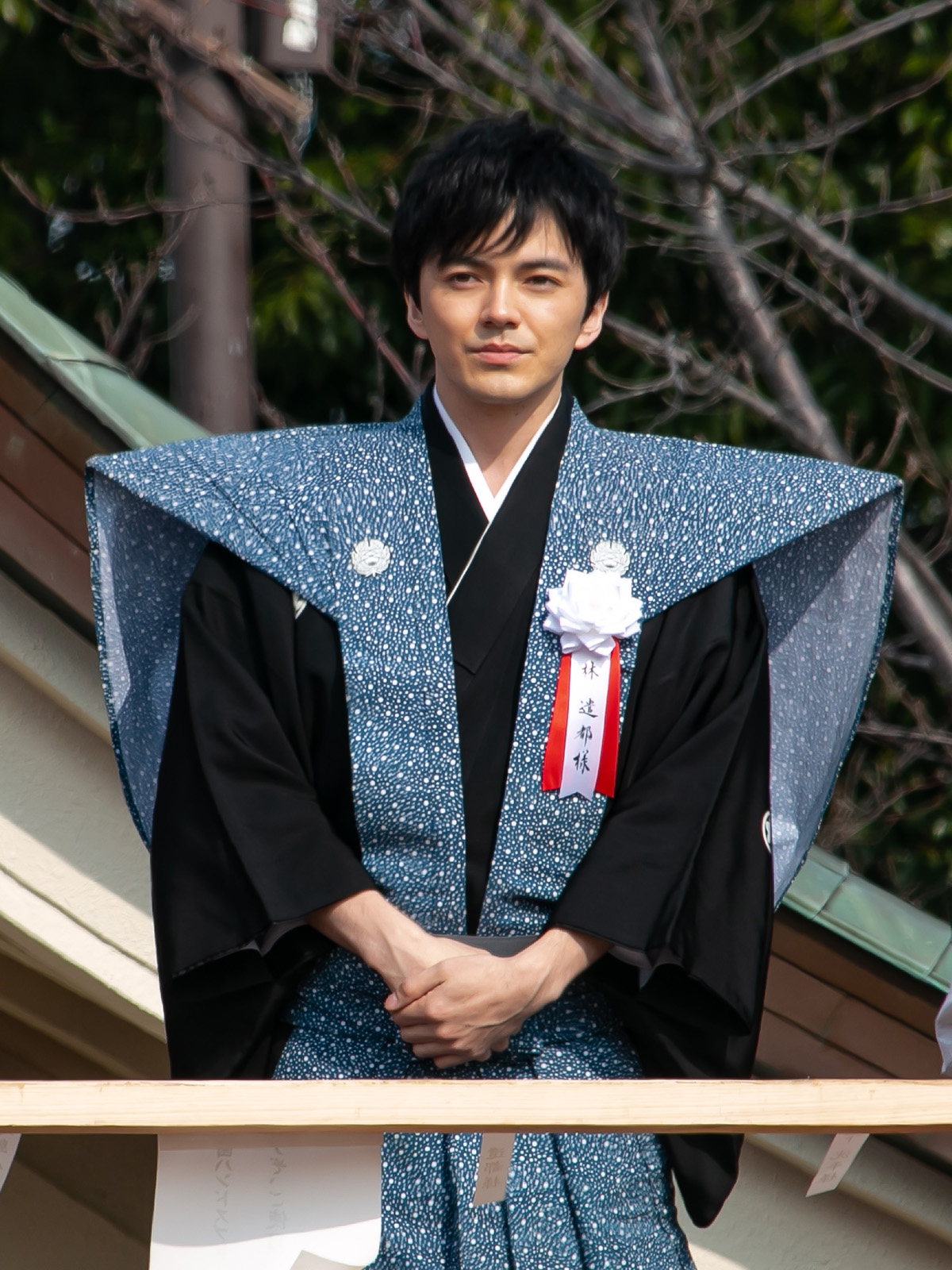
- Hayashi in 2020
- Born: 6 December 1990 (age 35); Ōtsu City, Shiga Prefecture, Japan
- Occupation: Actor
- Years active: 2007 - present
- Spouse: Yuko Oshima (m. 2021)
- Children: 2

Kento Hayashi (林遣都, Hayashi Kento; born December 6, 1990) is a Japanese actor. He has appeared in more than 30 films since 2007.

== Selected filmography ==
=== Film ===
Year	Title	Role	Notes	Ref.
2007	The Battery	Takumi Harada	Lead role	
2008	Dive!!	Tomoki Sakai	Lead role	
2016	Bitter Sweet	Nagisa Katayama	Lead role	
2020	Hold Me Back	Tada		
2021	Parasite in Love	Kengo Kōsaka	Lead role	
2021	Inubu: The Dog Club	Sōta Hanai	Lead role	
2021	In the Wake	Tomohiko Hasuda		
2023	Maboroshi	Tokimune Kikuiri (voice)		
2023	Refugee X	Kentaro Sasa		
2024	Don't Lose Your Head!	Saitō Kunai		
2025	Kyojo: Requiem	Kazumichi Hirata		
2027	Monet: Across the Sea of Time	Ryu Sonobe	Lead role	

=== Television ===
Year	Title	Role	Notes	Ref.
2011	QP	Gen Misaki		
2018–24	Ossan's Love	Ryota Maki	3 seasons	
2019	Idaten	Tsutomu Ōyokota	Taiga drama	
2020	Our Sister's Soulmate	Manato Yoshioka		
2021	Dragon Sakura	Sakamoto Tomoyuki	Season 2	
2022	Love with a Case	Suzunosuke Shikahama	Lead role	
2023	Malice	Naoto Hoshino	Lead role	
2023–26	Vivant	Suguru Nogi	2 seasons	
2026	Human Vapor	Fujita Fujikawa		

== Awards and nominations ==
Year	Award	Category	Work(s)	Result	Ref
2008	31st Japan Academy Film Prize	Newcomer of the Year	Battery	Won	
2019	22nd Nikkan Sports Drama Grand Prix	Best Supporting Actor	Ossan's Love	Won	
2021	46th Hochi Film Awards	Best Actor	Inubu: The Dog Club and Parasite in Love	Nominated	
