= Mirror (group) =

Hong Kong boy band

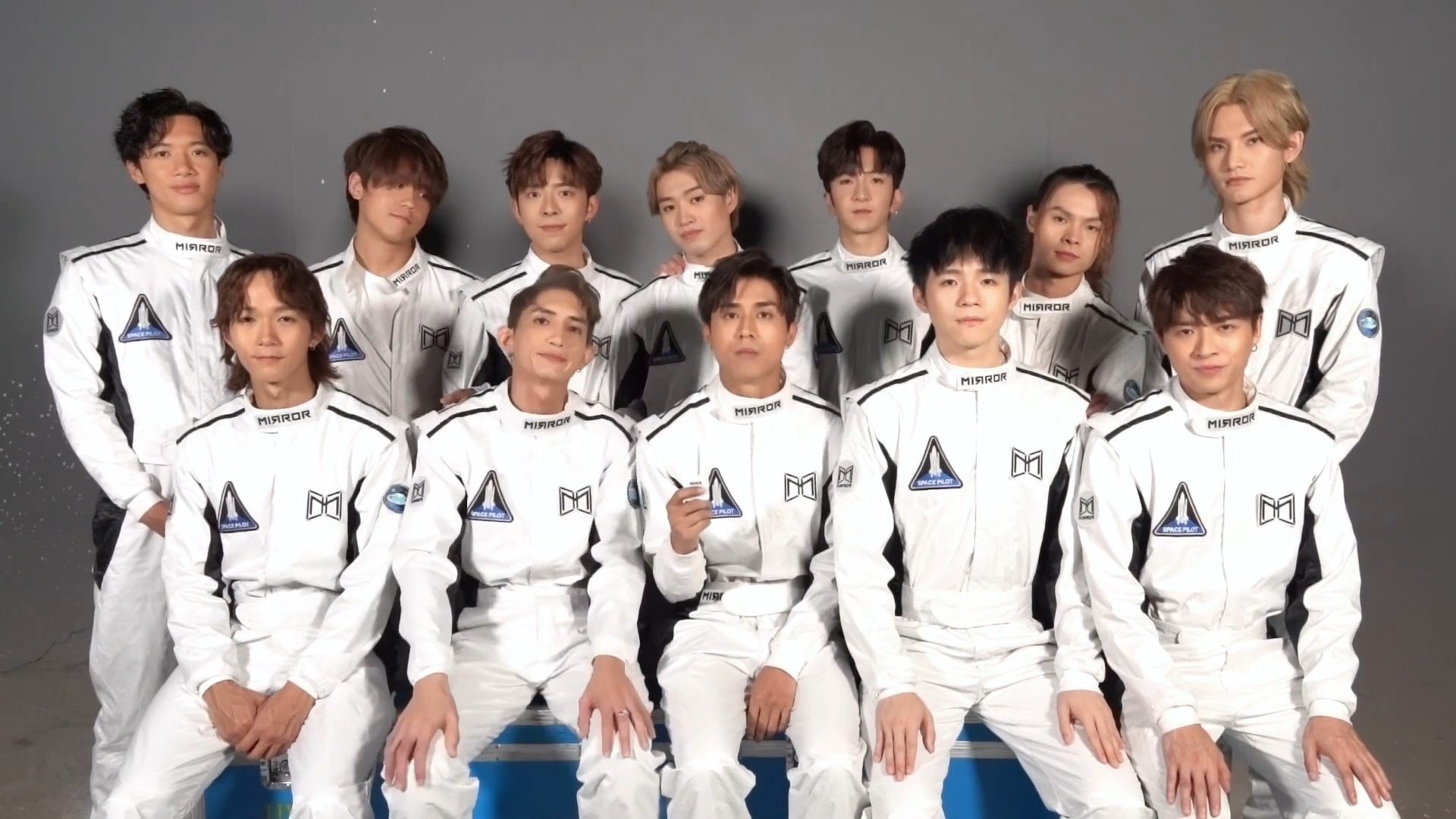
- Mirror in an interview for am730 in 2022

Background information
- Origin: Hong Kong
- Genres: Cantopop; dance-pop; Hong Kong English pop
- Years active: 2018–present
- Labels: Music Nation: ViuTV; MakerVille; HKTVE
- Members: Frankie Chan; Alton Wong; Lokman Yeung; Stanley Yau; Anson Kong; Jer Lau; Ian Chan; Anson Lo; Jeremy Lee; Edan Lui; Keung To; Tiger Yau

Mirror (stylised in all caps) is a Hong Kong boy group formed through ViuTV's reality talent show Good Night Show - King Maker in 2018. The group consists of twelve members: Frankie Chan, Alton Wong, Lokman Yeung, Stanley Yau, Anson Kong, Jer Lau, Ian Chan, Anson Lo, Jeremy Lee, Edan Lui, Keung To, and Tiger Yau. They debuted on 3 November 2018 with the single "In a Second".

The group has won numerous accolades since their debut, including a Metro Radio Hits Music Award for Best Group, an Ultimate Song Chart Award for Group of the Year (Gold), and Group of the Year (Gold) at the inaugural Chill Club Music Awards held by ViuTV. Mirror is credited for being one of the driving forces in the renewed interest of the Cantopop genre and to have prompted an unprecedented wave of fandom culture in Hong Kong. Their 2020 single "Ignited" won Top Ten Song of the Year at the Ultimate Song Chart Awards and the Chill Club Music Awards. Their 2021 single "Warrior" topped the Ultimate 903 Chart for two weeks, the first song from a group to do so in 15 years.

All members of Mirror have also debuted individually and participated in various drama series, reality shows, and films.

== Career ==
=== 2018: Good Night Show – King Maker and formation ===
In July 2018, ViuTV's reality talent competition Good Night Show - King Maker started scouting for potential artistes. 99 male contestants successfully auditioned for the show. Participants performed individually and in groups, with a panel of judges deciding who would advance to the next round. The finale aired live on 14 October 2018, with results decided by a public vote and a judging panel. Keung To won the competition, with Ian in second place, and Lokman in third. Anson Kong, Edan, Jeremy, and Stanley were among the top 10. ViuTV intended to form a boy group with the top 10 finalists and proceeded with contract talks.

=== 2018–2020: Debut and career beginnings ===
Mirror logo

Mirror officially debuted on 3 November 2018 with twelve members, with King Maker's producer, Ahfa Wong as the group's manager. According to the group's leader, Lokman, the name Mirror was chosen because "members look in the mirror every morning and see their real selves; when there are multiple mirrors, they can reflect infinite images; similarly, with infinite potential, the combination of these unique members would allow for unlimited possibilities." During the debut press conference, they performed their debut single "In a Second" (Chinese: 一秒間).

On 21 December 2018, they held their first live concert, the 2018 First Mirror Live Concert, at the Kowloonbay International Trade & Exhibition Centre Star Hall. The tickets were sold from 15 November 2018 and all tickets were sold out. During the concert, apart from performing some original songs, they also performed Korean pop songs including "Love Song" and "Trouble Maker", although they expressed their preference of creating their unique renditions instead of going for a "K-pop feel".

Between January 2019 and November 2020, the group released five more singles, including "ASAP" (2019), "Broken Mirror" (破鏡) (2019), first-year anniversary single "Reflection" (2019), "Ignited" (2020) and "One and All" (2020). "Ignited" won two awards at Hong Kong's major year-end music awards shows, including the Ultimate Song Chart Awards and the inaugural Chill Club Awards.

Members also began to make their solo debuts, with Ian and Keung To in 2019, and Anson Kong, Anson Lo, and Jer in 2020.

=== 2021–2022: Rising popularity and commercial success ===
On 20 January 2021, the group released their debut studio album, One and All, comprising six group singles and fifteen solo songs released by the members in 2020. In March 2021, Mirror released their group single "Warrior", with the lyrics "vastly usher in another new century" (浩浩蕩蕩迎來另一新世紀) which has become a symbol of the group since. "Warrior" topped the Ultimate Song Chart for two consecutive weeks, breaking a 15-year record, and also charted number one on Metro Radio and RTHK.

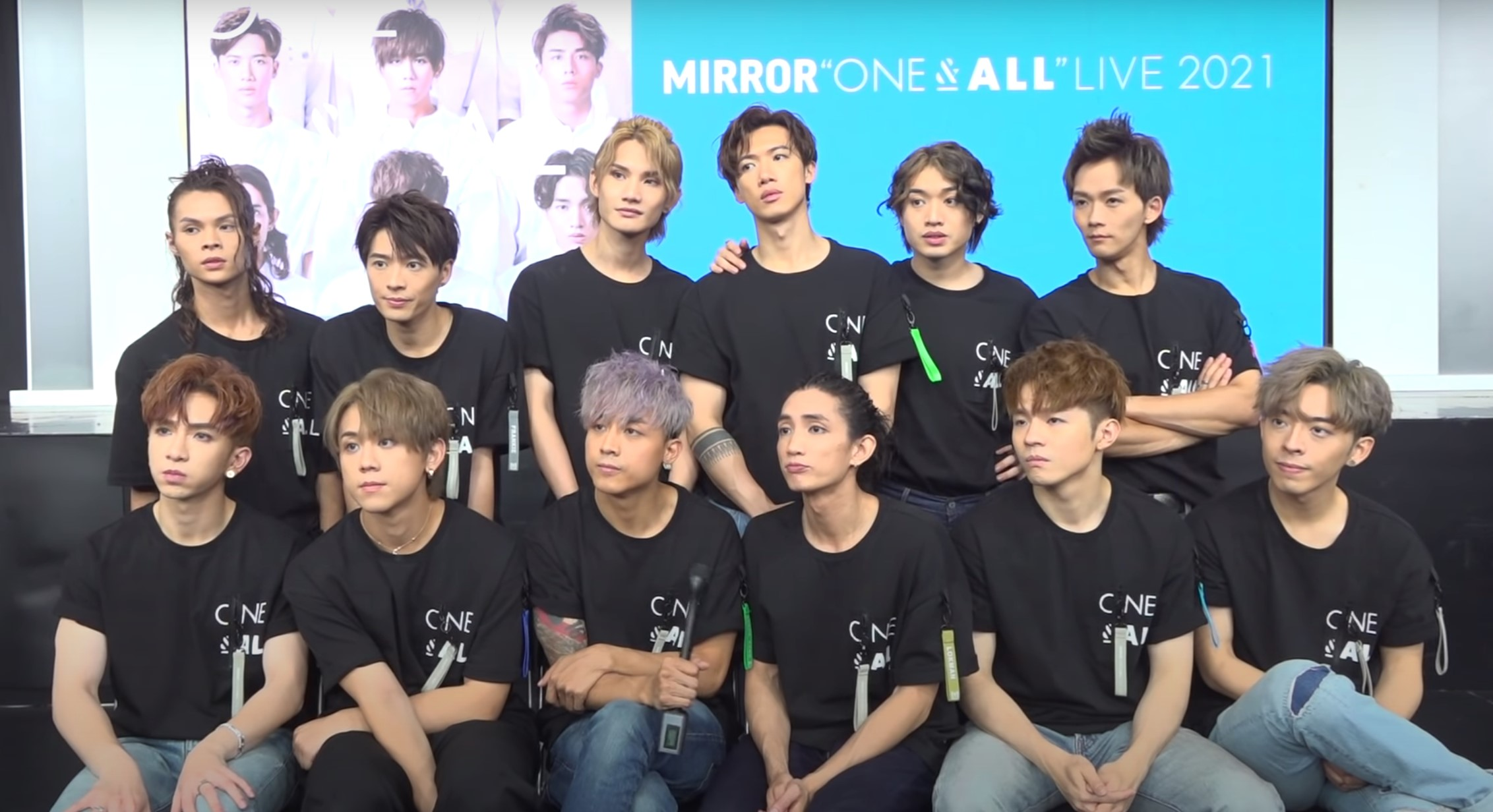
Mirror after their One and All Live 2021 concert

Originally, Mirror had planned to hold a concert in 2020 to mark the second anniversary of their debut, but it was postponed due to the COVID-19 pandemic. The postponed concert was eventually announced to be held from 6 to 8 May 2021, titled the Mirror "One & All" Live 2021, at Kowloon Bay International Trade & Exhibition Centre – Star Hall. It was planned to be held at 50% capacity due to the social distancing policy at the time but was increased to 75% capacity after two weeks following government guidelines. Tickets were sold out within minutes on 25 March 2021 for 6 to 8 May, and three more shows from 9 to 11 May were added.

On 9 June 2021, "Boss" was released. "All In One" was released on 3 November 2021, to mark the group's third anniversary. On 22 December 2021, Mirror released a Christmas themed new single, "12". Their twelfth single "Innerspace" was released on 25 April 2022. In March 2022, Edan confirmed in an interview that Mirror would be headlining a concert at the Hong Kong Coliseum in Summer 2022. On 26 April 2022, they held a press conference announcing their concert, titled the Mirror.We.Are Live Concert 2022, for 10 shows, from 25 to 31 July, and 2 to 4 August. An extra two shows were later added for 5 and 6 August, for members of Mirror's official fan club, Miro. All tickets were sold out. On 17 July, Mirror was invited to perform at the prestigious 40th Hong Kong Film Awards. On 22 July, "We Are" was released as the theme song for their concert.

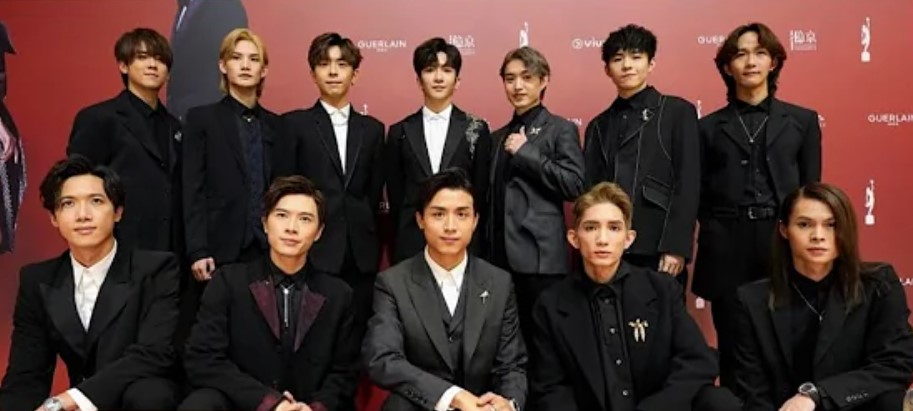
Mirror at the 40th Hong Kong Film Awards in July 2022

On 28 July 2022, during the fourth of the twelve planned shows at the Hong Kong Coliseum, a large overhead video screen weighing 500kg (1102lbs) fell down onto backup dancer, Moses "Mo" Li Kai-yin, 27, leaving him in critical condition. Li suffered serious damage to his nerves and remains in hospital, but his condition has improved over time. The accident also left a second backup dancer injured, Chang Tsz-fung, who had injuries to his pelvis and cervical spine. The concert was immediately halted and organisers announced the cancellation of remaining shows. Safety concerns had already been raised early on after dancer, Zisac Law Tak-chi, was reportedly injured during rehearsal, and member of Mirror, Frankie Chan, fell off stage two days prior to the accident. The HKSAR Government set up a task force to look into the matter. The Leisure and Cultural Services Department released the investigation report in November 2022.

On 10 October 2022, Mirror released the new single, "We All Are", marking their comeback after a two-month hiatus. At the 2022 Ultimate Song Chart Awards Presentation, Mirror won the Best Group Gold Award for the first time, and My Favourite Group Award for the second year in a row.

=== 2023–present: Global debut and first concert tour ===
On 8 January 2023, Mirror was invited by internationally renowned DJ, Alan Walker, to perform as special guest at his Hong Kong show, as part of his Walkerverse tour. On 17 March 2023, Mirror made their official global debut with the release of their first English single, "Rumours". Four Mirror members, Jer, Jeremy, Keung To and Anson Lo, later performed the song on the Japanese channel, The First Take. On 18 May 2023, it was announced at a press conference that six members would be holding solo concerts in the Summer of 2023 and 2024 in a concert series collectively titled "In My Sight". On 23 June 2023, Mirror released their first Cantonese single of the year, "Sheesh". On 13 October 2023, Mirror released the single "Catch a Vibe" as part of celebrations for their fifth anniversary.

On 20 November 2023, Mirror announced their first concert tour, titled the Feel the Passion World Tour. An official press conference held on 18 December 2023 further unveiled the cities of Macau, Singapore, Kuala Lumpur, London, Manchester, Los Angeles, San Francisco, New York and Toronto to be part of the upcoming tour. The tour opened with 16 sold out shows at the AsiaWorld–Arena in Hong Kong from mid January to February 2024. In December 2023, Mirror's travel variety show, MIRROR Time, aired. The show was filmed in Australia in collaboration with Tourism Tasmania and Tourism Australia, featuring locations in Victoria and Tasmania.

On 2 January 2024, Mirror released the single, "Rocketstars". On 21 March 2024, Mirror was featured on the "Future 25" list by Rolling Stone. On 28 March 2024, the action comedy film, We 12, starring all 12 members was theatrically released. On 5 April 2024, Mirror released their second English single, "Day 0", which features NBA star Damian Lillard (Dame D.O.L.L.A.). The group subsequently promoted the song on Good Day New York and CNN, marking their first official appearance on American television. On 23 September 2024, Mirror released the single "Hunt You Down". In December 2024, Mirror's cooking variety show, Mirror Chef, aired. On 19 February 2025, Mirror released the single "Indelible Mark" (手印).

== Other ventures ==
=== Participation in TV programmes ===
The first television reality show based on Mirror is Mirror Go, which aired from December 2018. In the show, members of the group played games in different parts of Hong Kong, including Ocean Park and Wu Kwai Sha Youth Village, while other episodes were filmed in Macau, Thailand and South Korea. Lokman said that the show was intended to resemble the South Korean programme Running Man, to provide members with opportunities to overcome challenges, live under the same roof and bond with each other as a group. The second season of the show, Mirror Go 2 released in May 2019. In every episode, a group of two members embarked on different missions, while others had to answer questions based on the footage of these missions. For the last 10 minutes of each episode, two members would partner with a fan and compete against each other in a series of Q&A. In 2021, all members of Mirror participated in ViuTV's game show Battle Feel (考有Feel) against ViuTV's other boy group Error, hosted by Kitty Yuen, Dixon Wong and Edan. In early April 2021, the group took part in a variety show titled Be A Better Mirror (調教你MIRROR) with actor-director Joey Leung Cho-yiu and the show aired from early June 2021 on ViuTV.

Members of the group have also participated in various television drama series aired on ViuTV. The first television drama with a member of Mirror as part of the main cast was Retire to Queen in 2019, starring Keung To. In 2020, a volleyball drama titled We are the Littles (男排女將) aired on ViuTV. It is the first television drama that starred all members of Mirror, with seven of them composing the main cast, including Ian, Anson Lo, Edan, Jer, Tiger, Alton and Jeremy. The other main casts include Stephy Tang and members of boy group Error, while other members of Mirror appeared in guest roles. In Audience at the Folk TV Awards 2020 (觀眾在民間電視大奬2020), which was open to public voting, the drama was nominated for various categories and won Best Drama, Best Screenplay and Best Cinematography. Anson Lo won Best Supporting Actor as Bobby in the drama. In June 2021, Edan, Anson Lo, and Stanley starred in the Hong Kong adaptation of the Japanese series Ossan's Love with actor Kenny Wong. Ossan's Love became ViuTV's highest-rated original television series.

=== Endorsements ===
Mirror, both individually and as a group, have acquired numerous endorsement deals in various industries throughout their career. They have collaborated with multiple luxury fashion brands such as Gucci, Dior, Burberry, Louis Vuitton, and Yves Saint Laurent, and endorsed cosmetics brands such as Shiseido, NARS Cosmetics, Charlotte Tilbury, Laura Mercier, and Estée Lauder. They are popular figures in the food industry as well, endorsing brands such as Häagen-Dazs, Vita, Nestlé, Deliveroo, and Coca-Cola. In 2021, three members of Mirror collaborated with McDonald's to release the Hong Kong-exclusive "Keung B Meal", headlined by Keung To. Anson Lo and Ian collaborated with the Hong Kong Tourism Board to promote local attractions during the COVID-19 pandemic in Hong Kong. In August 2021, Samsung Hong Kong announced Mirror as its ambassador for the Galaxy Z Fold3 5G and Z Flip3 5G smartphones. On 8 September 2021, it was announced Anson Lo and Edan were to join the Bvlgari Family and to star as brand ambassadors for their B.zero1 jewellery collections. In September 2021, Calvin Klein Hong Kong unveiled Anson Lo, Anson Kong, Ian, and Keung To, as the faces of their 2021 Autumn and Winter series, with their ad campaigns featuring across Asia. According to a report by admanGO in 2021, Mirror's ads amounted to 70% of Hong Kong's ad market, helping drive up ad spend overall. In October 2021 and December 2022, Mirror collaborated with McDonald's Hong Kong to promote the 'Famous Order' campaign. In February 2023, Watsons launched a crossover campaign with Mirror, titled 'Let's Go Green with MIRROR', to encourage customers across the four Asian markets of Hong Kong, Malaysia, Taiwan, and Singapore to make more sustainable choices.

== Members ==
- Frankie Chan (陳瑞輝)
- Alton Wong (王智德)
- Lokman Yeung (楊樂文) – leader
- Stanley Yau (邱士縉)
- Anson Kong (江𤒹生) – vice leader
- Jer Lau (柳應廷)
- Ian Chan (陳卓賢)
- Anson Lo (盧瀚霆)
- Jeremy Lee (李駿傑)
- Edan Lui (呂爵安)
- Keung To (姜濤)
- Tiger Yau (邱傲然)

== Discography ==
=== Studio albums ===
Title	Album details	Peak chart positions
Title	Album details	HK
One and All	Released: 20 January 2021; Label: Music National Records; Formats: CD, digital download, streaming	—

=== Singles ===
List of singles recorded by Mirror
Title	Year	Peak chart positions	Album	Ref.
Title	Year	HK	Album	Ref.
"In a Second" (一秒間)	2018	—	One and All	
"ASAP"	2018	—	One and All	
"Broken Mirror" (破鏡)	2019	—	One and All	
"Reflection"	2019	—	One and All	
"IGNITED"	2020	—	One and All	
"One and All"	2020	19	One and All	
"Warrior"	2021	—	TBA	
"The Beautiful Game"	2021	—	TBA	
"Boss"	2021	—	TBA	
"All In One"	2021	—	TBA	
"12"	2021	—	TBA	
"Innerspace"	2022	10	TBA	
"We Are"	2022	19	TBA	
"We All Are"	2022	13	TBA	
"Rumours"	2023	—	TBA	
"Sheesh"	2023	—	TBA	
"Catch a Vibe"	2023	—	TBA	
"Rocketstars"	2024	—	TBA	
"Hunt You Down"	2024	—	TBA	
"Indelible Mark" (手印)	2025	24	TBA	
"DNA is U"	2025	—		

=== Collaborations ===
Title	Year	Artists	Notes
"Day 0"	2024	Mirror feat. Dame D.O.L.L.A.	First English track

=== Unit songs ===
Title	Year	Members
"Strawberry Love"	2024	Anson Lo, Edan, Jeremy, Keung To
"Culture Vulture" (吃腐肉的鷹)	2024	Ian, Jer, Stanley, Tiger
"FING!"	2024	Alton, Anson Kong, Frankie, Lokman
"DUM!"	2025	Alton, Anson Kong, Frankie, Lokman

=== Other songs ===
Title	Year	Notes
"Gold Statue" (金人)	2022	The 40th Hong Kong Film Awards Theme Song
"Go Green"	2023	Watsons x Mirror 'Let's Go Green' Theme Song

== Filmography ==
=== Film ===
Year	Title	Chinese Title	Note
2024	We 12	12怪盜	

=== Television series ===
Year	Title	Chinese title	Network
2020	We Are the Littles	男排女將	ViuTV

=== Variety shows ===
Year	Title	Network	Note
2018	Good Night Show - King Maker	ViuTV	
2018	Mirror Go	ViuTV	
2019	Mirror Go 2	ViuTV	
2019	Mirror 1st Anniversary	ViuTV	
2019	King Maker II	ViuTV	
2021	Battle Feel	ViuTV	
2021	Be a Better MIRROR	ViuTV	
2021	Mirror Euro Goal Fun	Now TV	
2023	Shiny Summer – MIRROR+	ViuTV	
2023	Mirror Time	ViuTV	
2024	Mirror Chef	ViuTV	

=== Radio shows ===
Year	Title	Role	Network	Note
2019–2020	MIRROR Channel	Host	Metro Info (FM 99.7)	

== Concerts and tours ==
List of standalone concerts by Mirror
Title	Date(s)	City	Venue	Ref.
2018 The First Mirror Live Concert	21 December 2018	Hong Kong	Star Hall, KITEC	
Mirror "One & All" Live 2021	6 May 2021	Hong Kong	Star Hall, KITEC	
Mirror "One & All" Live 2021	7 May 2021	Hong Kong	Star Hall, KITEC	
Mirror "One & All" Live 2021	8 May 2021	Hong Kong	Star Hall, KITEC	
Mirror "One & All" Live 2021	9 May 2021	Hong Kong	Star Hall, KITEC	
Mirror "One & All" Live 2021	10 May 2021	Hong Kong	Star Hall, KITEC	
Mirror "One & All" Live 2021	11 May 2021	Hong Kong	Star Hall, KITEC	
Mirror.We.Are Live Concert 2022	25 July 2022	Hong Kong	Hong Kong Coliseum	(Note: Originally scheduled for 12 shows, the remaining 8 shows were cancelled due to an accident at the venue.)
Mirror.We.Are Live Concert 2022	26 July 2022	Hong Kong	Hong Kong Coliseum	(Note: Originally scheduled for 12 shows, the remaining 8 shows were cancelled due to an accident at the venue.)
Mirror.We.Are Live Concert 2022	27 July 2022	Hong Kong	Hong Kong Coliseum	(Note: Originally scheduled for 12 shows, the remaining 8 shows were cancelled due to an accident at the venue.)
Mirror.We.Are Live Concert 2022	28 July 2022	Hong Kong	Hong Kong Coliseum	(Note: Originally scheduled for 12 shows, the remaining 8 shows were cancelled due to an accident at the venue.)
Mirror "12 AS 1" Live 2026	11 December 2026	Hong Kong	AsiaWorld–Arena	
Mirror "12 AS 1" Live 2026	12 December 2026	Hong Kong	AsiaWorld–Arena	
Mirror "12 AS 1" Live 2026	13 December 2026	Hong Kong	AsiaWorld–Arena	
Mirror "12 AS 1" Live 2026	15 December 2026	Hong Kong	AsiaWorld–Arena	
Mirror "12 AS 1" Live 2026	16 December 2026	Hong Kong	AsiaWorld–Arena	
Mirror "12 AS 1" Live 2026	17 December 2026	Hong Kong	AsiaWorld–Arena	
Mirror "12 AS 1" Live 2026	18 December 2026	Hong Kong	AsiaWorld–Arena	
Mirror "12 AS 1" Live 2026	19 December 2026	Hong Kong	AsiaWorld–Arena	
Mirror "12 AS 1" Live 2026	20 December 2026	Hong Kong	AsiaWorld–Arena	
Mirror "12 AS 1" Live 2026	21 December 2026	Hong Kong	AsiaWorld–Arena	
Mirror "12 AS 1" Live 2026	23 December 2026	Hong Kong	AsiaWorld–Arena	
Mirror "12 AS 1" Live 2026	24 December 2026	Hong Kong	AsiaWorld–Arena	
Mirror "12 AS 1" Live 2026	25 December 2026	Hong Kong	AsiaWorld–Arena	
Mirror "12 AS 1" Live 2026	26 December 2026	Hong Kong	AsiaWorld–Arena	

=== Feel the Passion World Tour ===
List of concert dates
Date	City	Country	Venue	Ref.
15 January 2024	Hong Kong		AsiaWorld–Arena	
16 January 2024	Hong Kong		AsiaWorld–Arena	
17 January 2024	Hong Kong		AsiaWorld–Arena	
19 January 2024	Hong Kong		AsiaWorld–Arena	
20 January 2024	Hong Kong		AsiaWorld–Arena	
21 January 2024	Hong Kong		AsiaWorld–Arena	
22 January 2024	Hong Kong		AsiaWorld–Arena	
24 January 2024	Hong Kong		AsiaWorld–Arena	
25 January 2024	Hong Kong		AsiaWorld–Arena	
26 January 2024	Hong Kong		AsiaWorld–Arena	
27 January 2024	Hong Kong		AsiaWorld–Arena	
29 January 2024	Hong Kong		AsiaWorld–Arena	
30 January 2024	Hong Kong		AsiaWorld–Arena	
31 January 2024	Hong Kong		AsiaWorld–Arena	
2 February 2024	Hong Kong		AsiaWorld–Arena	
3 February 2024	Hong Kong		AsiaWorld–Arena	
12 March 2024	London	England	The O2 Arena	
14 March 2024	Manchester	England	AO Arena	
5 April 2024	San Francisco	United States	Oakland Arena	
9 April 2024	Los Angeles	United States	Peacock Theater	
13 April 2024	New York	United States	UBS Arena	
17 April 2024	Toronto	Canada	Meridian Hall	
1 May 2024	Singapore		Singapore Indoor Stadium	
16 May 2024	Macau		Galaxy Arena	
17 May 2024	Macau		Galaxy Arena	
18 May 2024	Macau		Galaxy Arena	
19 May 2024	Macau		Galaxy Arena	

List of cancelled show(s)
Date	City	Country	Venue	Reason
28 April 2024	Kuala Lumpur	Malaysia	Axiata Arena	Cancelled due to unforeseen circumstances

== Impact ==
Mirror have been described by local and international media as "the new kings of Cantopop", and a "Cantopop phenomenon". They are credited for reviving the Cantopop genre, which had been slowly declining since the 2000s. Mirror's appeal in Hong Kong transcends demographics, and the group is regarded as a "symbol of hope" in a city struggling with political upheaval and the COVID-19 pandemic. Luisa Tam from the South China Morning Post described Mirror as "the latest icon to represent Hong Kong pride", which the city has not seen since the deaths of Cantopop icons Leslie Cheung and Anita Mui in 2003. New York Times reported that there were faces of the group members on "ads for everything". A tongue-in-cheek Facebook group called "My Wife Married Mirror and Left My Marriage In Ruins" gained 300,000 members, more than double the followers count on the official Facebook page. In 2022, Mirror was listed on Tatler Asia's Most Influential. In 2024, Mirror was featured on the "Future 25" List by Rolling Stone.

== Awards and nominations ==
Name of award ceremony, year presented, award category, nominee of award, and result of nomination
Award ceremony	Year	Category	Nominee(s) / Work(s)	Result	Ref.
Chill Club Awards	2021	Group of the Year	Mirror	Gold	
Chill Club Awards	2021	Top 10 Songs – No.2	"Boss"	Won	
Chill Club Awards	2022	Group of the Year	Mirror	Gold	
Chill Club Awards	2022	Top 10 Songs – No.2	"Ignited"	Won	
KKBOX Hong Kong Music Awards	2022	Top 10 Most Streamed Artists	Mirror	Won	
Metro Radio Hits Music Awards	2020	Best Group	Mirror	Won	
Metro Radio Hits Music Awards	2021	Best Group	Mirror	Won	
Metro Radio Hits Music Awards	2021	Song Award	"Boss"	Won	
Metro Radio Hits Music Awards	2022	Best Group	Mirror	Won	
Metro Radio Hits Music Awards	2022	My Favourite Song	"Innerspace"	Won	
Top Ten Chinese Gold Songs Award	2019	Best New Artist	Mirror	Silver	
Ultimate Song Chart Awards Presentation	2020	Best Group	Mirror	Bronze	
Ultimate Song Chart Awards Presentation	2020	Top 10 Ultimate Songs – No.3	"Ignited"	Won	
Ultimate Song Chart Awards Presentation	2021	Best Group	Mirror	Silver	
Ultimate Song Chart Awards Presentation	2021	My Favourite Group	Mirror	Won	
Ultimate Song Chart Awards Presentation	2021	Top 10 Ultimate Songs – No.2	"Boss"	Won	
Ultimate Song Chart Awards Presentation	2022	Best Group	Mirror	Gold	
Ultimate Song Chart Awards Presentation	2022	My Favourite Group	Mirror	Won	
Ultimate Song Chart Awards Presentation	2023	My Favourite Group	Mirror	Won	
Ultimate Song Chart Awards Presentation	2024	My Favourite Group	Mirror	Won	
