= Edan Lui =

Hong Kong singer, actor and presenter

- 呂爵安
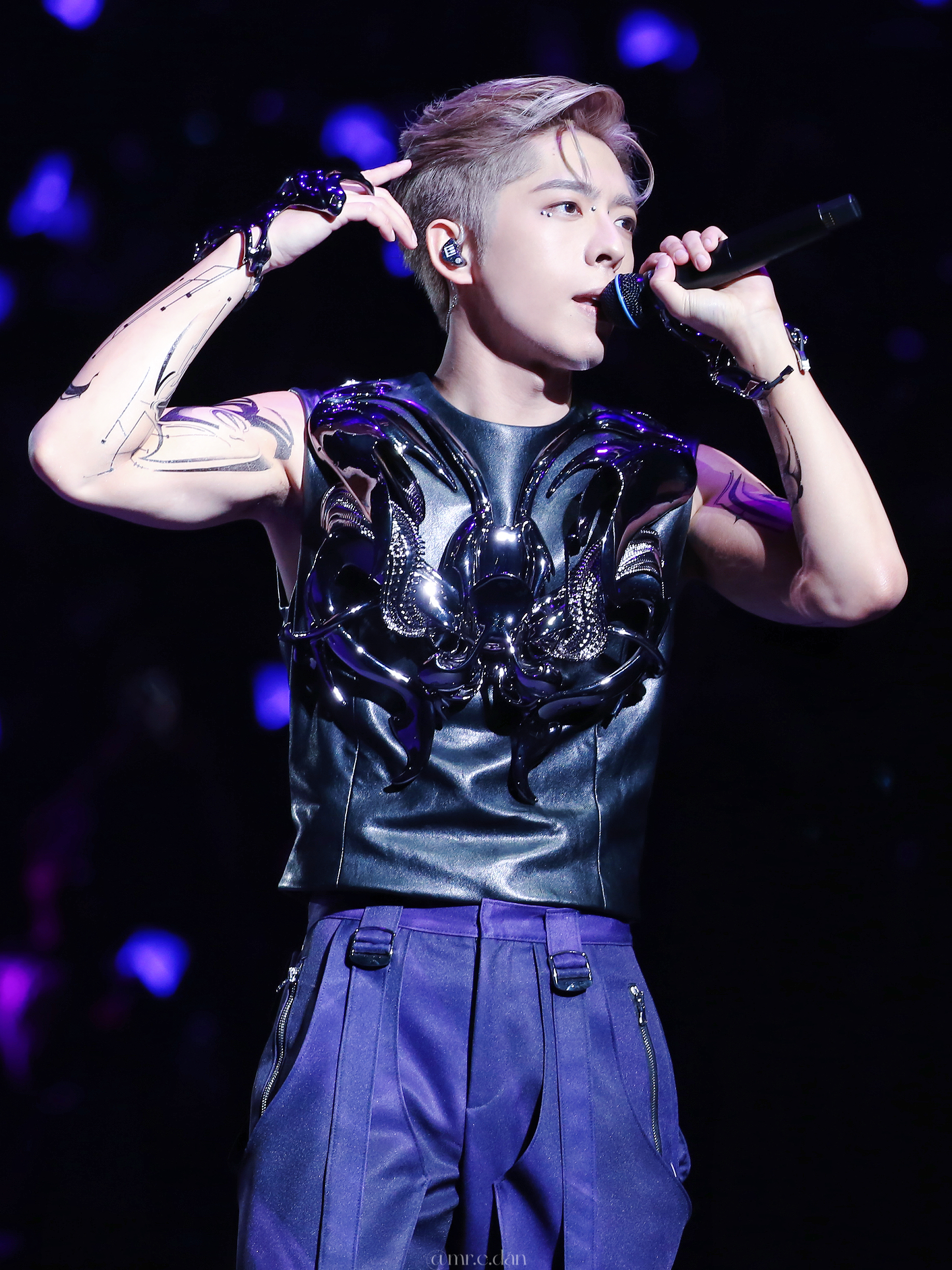
- Lui In My Sight of E first solo concert 2023
- Born: 21 January 1997 (age 29); British Hong Kong
- Education: University of Hong Kong (BBA)
- Occupations: Singer; dancer; actor; presenter
- Agent: HKTVE
- Musical career
- Genres: Cantopop; dance pop
- Instruments: Vocals; piano; violin; recorder
- Years active: 2018–present
- Label: Music Nation
- Member of: Mirror

Chinese name
- Chinese: 呂爵安
Transcriptions
Standard Mandarin
- Hanyu Pinyin: Lǚ Jué'ān
- Bopomofo: ㄌㄩˇ ㄐㄩㄝˊ ㄢ
- Wade–Giles: lü chüeh-an
Yue: Cantonese
- Jyutping: leoi^{5} zeok^{3} on^{1}
- IPA: [lɵɥ˩˧ tsœk̚˧ ɔn˥]

Edan Lui Cheuk-on (Chinese: 呂爵安; born 22 January 1997), is a Hong Kong idol, singer, actor, presenter, and a member of the Hong Kong boy group Mirror. Apart from his group activities, Edan made his solo debut in 2021 and has presented various television variety shows such as Be ON Game, and starred in television dramas, most notably Ossan's Love (2021), as well as several feature films, including Chilli Laugh Story and Hong Kong Family.

== Early life and career ==
=== Background and debut ===
Edan was born in Hong Kong on 21 January 1997. He attended Salesian Yip Hon Millennium Primary School in Kwai Chung and the acclaimed Ho Fung College. Edan achieved high scores in the HKDSE. While studying business administration at the University of Hong Kong in 2018, Edan auditioned for ViuTV's reality talent competition Good Night Show - King Maker playing piano and singing Tanya Chua's "Blank Space", which put him through to the Top 50 and eventually into the Top 10. Prior to the competition, Edan was already a holder of Grade 8 certificates in both piano and violin, and is known to have perfect pitch. Edan finished the competition in eighth place, earning him a spot in the twelve-member boy group Mirror. The group debuted on 3 November 2018 with the single "In a Second" (Chinese: 一秒間).

=== Music ===
In January 2021, Edan was the sixth Mirror member to have his solo debut. His first single, "Mr. E's Series of Unfortunate Events" (E先生 連環不幸事件) topped the 903 Top 20, Metro Radio Madden Song Chart and Chill Club charts. It also topped JOOX Hong Kong's Best-Selling Song Chart of Mid-2021. Later that year, he also released singles "Little Comedian" (小諧星) and "My Apple Pie" as a solo artist, as well as "Talents" (一表人才) / "A Promising Young Man" (年輕有為) as a pair of duets with Taiwanese singer Kenny Khoo (Qiu Fengze). Edan's musical pursuits in 2021 gained him the Newcomer Award at the 2021 Metro Radio Hit Awards, the Silver Newcomer Award at the 2021 Ultimate Song Chart Awards, and the Silver Newcomer Award at the 2021/2022 Chill Club Chart Awards.

On 1 April 2022, Edan released his first dance single, "Elevator". The song is also the first of Edan's solo singles to feature him rapping.

In June 2022, Edan sang a duet with Leo Ku as part of Ku's special album, IRLTS (I Really Love To Sing) which revisits his old songs and re-releases them as collaborations. Edan features on the first single, Floating Classroom (漂流教室), which was originally released in 2004.

Edan's fifth single, "Loverse", was released at midnight on New Year's Day of 2023.

Later in May, Edan released his first single in the synth-rock genre, "ChatMrE", a commentary on the role of artificial intelligence in the creative process and in romance.

In preparation for his "In My Sight of E" solo concert, Edan released three more singles starting July 2023 in order to expand and diversify his discography. Originally, he had planned to release at least five more tracks, but was only able to release three due to time constraints.

The first of the three consists of slow ballad "Mr. E's License to Love" (E先生 愛人執照), a continuation of "Mr. E's Series of Unfortunate Events" (E先生連環不幸事件), making the two songs part of an ongoing series. The second track, "Again!" came out three days before the first show of the concert. A third track, "Come With Me" (霸道總裁), was released the following day, and serves as Edan's second dance number since "Elevator". "Come With Me" does not have a music video yet, and so the dance will be shown for the first time at the concert starting 25 August 2023.

=== Television ===
Edan made his acting debut on the sitcom Showman's Show (娛樂風雲) (2019), playing a religious young man who dreams of debuting in a boy band. He played a major supporting role with other Mirror members as one of the team members in the volleyball drama We are the Littles (男排女將)(2020), and earned critical acclaim starring as Tin Yat-hung in the romantic comedy drama Ossan's Love (大叔的愛) (2021), an adaptation of the original Japanese television drama. In July 2022, Edan played Marven Lee, one of the lead roles in iSWIM, which is a ten-episode miniseries directed by Fung Chih-Chiang. Later that year, he also played Tak in the basketball drama We Got Game (季前賽) alongside fellow Mirror members Stanley Yau and Keung To.

In late April 2023, ViuTV announced that they would be filming a Hong Kong adaptation of hit Korean romantic comedy drama Business Proposal (社內相親), with Edan playing Secretary Alfred Cheung (originally Cha Sung-hoon) and Anson Lo in the role of President Timo Keung (originally Kang Tae-moo), with Shirley Sham and Hanna Chan playing the female leads. The series is set to air near the end of this year.

=== Film ===
In June 2021, it was announced that Edan would soon make his big screen debut in Lunar New Year comedy Chilli Laugh Story (闔家辣) (2022), co-starring Sandra Ng, Gigi Leung, and Ronald Cheng. Edan plays the role of Coba, who is based on the film's director and screenwriter, Coba Cheng. Edan also sings the original soundtrack "When Life Gives You Chillies" (辣到出汁) with Sandra Ng and Gigi Leung. The film's premiere was originally scheduled for February 2022, but was postponed until 14 July 2022 due to cinemas across Hong Kong being closed as a result of COVID pandemic restrictions. The film surpassed HK$10 million at the Hong Kong box office within four days.

Premiering in November 2022, Edan also played a main role, Yeung, in Hong Kong Family (過時過節) which also stars Teresa Mo. Hong Kong Family marks Edan's first major role in the dramatic genre. He also sings the original soundtrack, No Matter How Far (攀上天梯的螞蟻), for the film.

Edan's roles in Chilli Laugh Story and Hong Kong Family garnered him two nominations in the category of Best New Performer at the 41st Hong Kong Film Awards.

In April 2023, Edan played Messi Cheung in Over My Dead Body (死屍死時四十四), a black comedy in which Edan once again works with Ronald Cheng and Teresa Mo, and also features fellow Mirror member Jer Lau in a supporting role.

Filming for a new movie titled The Moon Thieves (盜月者) began in Tokyo in mid-March 2023, and continued into late April in Hong Kong. The film will star Edan in the role of pawned watch embezzler Ma Sang, with fellow Mirror member Anson Lo, Louis Cheung, and Michael Ning also in leading roles. Fellow Mirror member Keung To also has a supporting role in the film.

Edan will also feature in Makerville's own film production, WE12 (12怪盜), a comedy action film starring all the members of Mirror.

In September, Sandra Ng, the producer of Chilli Laugh Story, announced that the film would have a sequel featuring the original cast, this time centering around the theme of mahjong. The film was scheduled to be released around the Lunar New Year period of 2023. However, news of production and filming has yet to be announced.

=== Voice acting ===
In 2021, Edan took on the role of the Cantonese voice of Finny, a young Nestrian, in the Cantonese dubbed version of 2020 Belgian animated film Ooops! The Adventure Continues alongside Shirley Chan, who voices Leia.

Edan also voiced Hank, a beagle dog who aspires to be a samurai, in the Cantonese dubbed version of Paws of Fury: The Legend of Hank. He will once again work with Shirley Chan, as well as fellow Mirror member Stanley Yau. The film premiered in Hong Kong cinemas starting January 19, 2023.

=== Variety shows ===
Edan told his manager early during his debut with Mirror that he wanted to pursue work in variety shows. Despite appearing shy and reserved, Edan displayed his comedic side on Mirror Go, which saw Edan and his bandmates travel to different countries to take on absurd and dangerous challenges. Following two seasons of Mirror Go, Edan has also hosted a number of variety shows on ViuTV, including Taiwan Meimei (2019) (臺灣文西Only You), which he hosted alongside Cantonese opera veteran Law Kar-ying, and the game show Battle Feel (考有Feel). His most notable work as a host is for the game show Be On Game (膠戰), which has run for four seasons to date. In July 2023, ViuTV aired a five-episode summer special variety show, Mirror+, hosted by the twelve members of Mirror. He has also been in 2 other variety shows for the band's anniversaries, with that being Mirror Time, following the 12 bandmates on a vacation to Tasmania, Australia and Mirror Chef, featuring the 12 members of Mirror in a cooking show starring many other professional chefs.

=== YouTube channel ===
Edan has his own YouTube channel, on which he usually posts a vlog series titled Come To Work With Me. Each episode shows behind-the-scenes footage of various projects he works on, including filming for music videos, variety shows, television series, as well as work trips. Previously, he also posted vlogs of his day-to-day life, as well as piano covers of different songs.

=== Fashion ===
Edan attended the 2023 Fall-Winter show for KENZO at Paris Fashion Week in January 2023.

On 1 April 2023, Edan launched his own lifestyle brand, NADE, which creates streetwear, lifestyle products, accessories, and seasonal treats.

On 30 August 2023, Edan was named as one of the honourees of the Prestige 40 under 40 Class of 2023.

On 1 September 2024, Edan was named Tatler Asia's Most Stylish 2024.

== Discography ==
=== Singles ===
==== As lead artist ====
Year	Title	Original Title	Notes
2021	"Mr. E's Series of Unfortunate Events"	E先生 連環不幸事件	Solo debut
2021	"Little Comedian"	小諧星	
2021	"My Apple Pie"	My Apple Pie	
2022	"Elevator"	Elevator	
2023	"Loverse"	Loverse	
2023	"ChatMrE"	ChatMrE	
2023	"Mr. E's License to Love"	E先生 愛人執照	
2023	"Again!"	Again!	
2023	"Come With Me"	霸道總裁	
2024	"Shakespeare of Yau Ma Tei"	油麻地莎士比亞	
2024	"Moonlight Sonata in “E“ minor"	月光奏明曲 Moonlight Sonata in “E“ minor	
2024	"Silver Bullet"	純銀子彈	
2025	"You Should Know Me Better Than Anyone Else"	你應該是這世界上最懂我的人啊？	Mandarin version of "Silver Bullet"
2025	"Fool Me"	天天都是愚人節	
2025	" I thought..."	我以為可以	Mandarin version of "Fool Me"
2025	"Capital E"	Capital E	

==== Collaborations ====
Year	Title	Original Title	Notes
2021	"Talents" (with Kenny Khoo)	一表人才	
2021	"Promising Young Man" (with Kenny Khoo)	年青有為	Mandarin version of "Talents"
2022	"Floating Classroom" (with Leo Ku)	漂流教室	
2023	"Others Said" (with Nine Chen)	我們都是別人口中的壞人	
2024	"Gradually" (with Jace Chan)	漸漸我們	

==== Soundtrack appearances ====
Year	Title	Original Title	Album
2021	"Sudden Feeling of a Heartbeat"	突如其來的心跳感覺 (with Anson Lo)	Ossan's Love OST
2022	"When Life Gives You Chillies"	辣到出汁 (with Sandra Ng and Gigi Leung)	Chilli Laugh Story OST
2022	"Plastic On!"	膠On! (with Jeffrey Ngai, Ah Jeng, Hillary Lau, Kaki Sham, and Cheong Fat)	Be ON Game OST
2022	"i.SWIM"	I SWIM	i.SWIM OST
2022	"The Lunatics' Anthem"	痴漢之歌 _{(with Keung To, Ian Chan, Stanley Yau, Fatboy, 193, and Louis Cheung)}	We Got Game OST
2022	"No Matter How Far"	攀上天梯的螞蟻	Hong Kong Family OST
2023	"Your Dark Horse"	你的黑馬	Business Proposal OST
2023	"The Space Between Us"	我與你的差距 (with Anson Lo)	Business Proposal OST

== Filmography ==
=== Television series ===
Year	English title	Original title	Role	Notes/Ref.
2019	Showman's Show	娛樂風雲	Forever	Recurring role
2020	We Are The Littles	男排女將	Ah Sun	Main ensemble role
2021	Ossan's Love (Hong Kong)	大叔的愛	Tin	Lead role
2022	iSWIM		Marven Lee	Lead role
2022	We Got Game	季前賽	Tak	Main ensemble role
2023	Business Proposal (Hong Kong)	社內相親	Alfred	Lead role
2025	City Of Light	光明大押	Kwan Chun	Lead role
2025	Taxi Driver 3	모범택시 3	Michael Chang	
2026	Long Vacation (HK version)	悠長假期	Marty Lai	Lead role

=== Variety show ===
Year	Title	Original Title	Notes
2018	Good Night Show – King Maker	Good Night Show 全民造星	Contestant No. 63, finished in 8th place
2018	Mirror Go	Mirror Go	
2019	Mirror Go 2	Mirror Go 2	
2019	Taiwan Meimei	臺灣文西Only You	Host
2019	King Maker II	全民造星II	
2020	Staycation	今晚瞓酒店	Host
2020	Be ON Game	膠戰	Host
2020	King Maker III	全民造星III	Guest performer (with Mirror)
2021	Battle Feel	考有Feel	Host
2021	Be a Better Mirror	調教你Mirror	
2021	Be ON Game Season 2	膠戰S2	Host
2023	Be ON Game Season 3	膠戰S3	Host
2023	Mirror+	Mirror+	Host (with Mirror)
2023	Mirror Time	Mirror Time	
2024	Mirror Chef	Mirror Chef	
2025	Be ON Game Season 4	膠戰S4	Host

=== Film ===
Year	English Title	Original Title	Role	Notes/Ref.
2021	Ooops! The Adventure Continues	反轉方舟動物團 Ooops 2	Finny	Voice only, Cantonese version
2022	Chilli Laugh Story	闔家辣	Coba	Lead role
2022	Hong Kong Family	過時過節	Yeung	Lead role
2023	Over My Dead Body	死屍死時四十四	Messi Cheung	Main ensemble role
2023	Paws of Fury: The Legend of Hank	非常貓狗反轉武林	Hank	Voice only, Cantonese version
2024	The Moon Thieves	盜月者	Vincent Ma	Main role
2024	We 12	12怪盜	Edan	Main Role
2024	Papa	爸爸	Ming (mature)	Cameo appearance
TBA		法迷藏		

=== Music video appearances ===
Year	Title	Artist	Ref.
2020	"蒙著嘴說愛你"	Keung To	
2021	"不可愛教主"	Anson Lo	
2022	"浮木"	Kenny Khoo	

== Concerts ==
=== Solo ===
Year	Date	Name	Venue	Notes/Ref.
2023	25–27 August	Edan Lui "In My Sight of E" Solo Concert 2023	AsiaWorld–Arena	

=== Collaborations ===
Year	Date	Name	Venue	Collaborating Artist(s)
2021	7–8 December	Moov Live Music on the Road	Hall 5BC, HKCEC	Anson Kong, Anson Lo, Ian Chan, Jer Lau, Keung To
2024	22 June	903 Music is Live Concert "Sparkleキラキラ"	AsiaWorld–Arena	Jace Chan, Jeffrey Ngai, Marf Yau

== Awards and nominations ==
=== Music award ===
Year	Award ceremony	Network	Venue	Category	Result
2021	2021 Metro Radio Music Awards	Metro Radio	Hong Kong Convention and Exhibition Centre	Audience's Favorite Newcomer	Won
2022	Ultimate Song Chart Awards Presentation 2021	CRHK	AsiaWorld–Arena, AsiaWorld–Expo	Best Male Newcomer	Silver
2022	Chill Club Awards 21/22	ViuTV	Star Hall, KITEC	Best Male Newcomer	Silver

=== Film award ===
Year	Award	Category	Nominated Work	Result
2023	41st Hong Kong Film Awards	Best New Performer	Chilli Laugh Story	Nominated
2023	41st Hong Kong Film Awards	Best New Performer	Hong Kong Family	Nominated
