= Kidnap Game =

2026 Japanese-Hong Kong-South Korean television series

- Promotional poster
- Genre: Mystery; Thriller
- Directed by: Kato Yusuke
- Starring: Kentaro Sakaguchi; Lee Joon-gi; Alice Ko; Stanley Yau; Carrie Wong; Joel Torre; Praew Narupornkamol Chaisang; Shinnosuke Mitsushima
- Music by: Face 2 fAKE
- No. of episodes: 7

Production
- Production locations: Bangkok; Hong Kong; Manila; Naha; Seoul; Singapore; Taipei; Tokyo
- Running time: 46-58 minutes
- Production companies: Fuji Television; Robot Communications; MakerVille; SimStory

Original release
- Network: Fuji TV; Channel A Viu
- Release: October 6, 2026 – present

Kidnap Game (stylized as kiDnap GAME) is a 2026 television drama series. It is a collaboration between Japan's Fuji Television and studio Robot Communications, Hong Kong's MakerVille, and South Korea's SimStory. The series stars an international ensemble cast including Kentaro Sakaguchi, Lee Joon-gi, Alice Ko, Stanley Yau, Carrie Wong, Joel Torre, Praew Narupornkamol Chaisang, and Shinnosuke Mitsushima.

It premiered on October 6, 2026 and consists of 11 episodes, each approximately 45 minutes in length, airing every Tuesday night at 22:00 (KST) on Channel A (South Korea) and 21:00 (JST) on Fuji TV (Japan).

The series is also available for streaming on Viu in selected regions across Southeast Asia, the Middle East, and South Africa, and on Hami Video in Taiwan.

== Synopsis ==
The series begins with seven simultaneous abductions occurring across seven Asian cities, sparking intense global media attention. The families of the victims receive a stark ultimatum: "How far are you willing to go? Only one can be saved." Seven strangers from disparate backgrounds become interconnected as each is assigned a distinct and potentially lethal mission. As they race against time in a high-stakes contest, the narrative explores the identity of the mastermind and the ultimate purpose of the deadly game.

== Cast ==
=== Main ===
- Kentaro Sakaguchi as Niide Toshiro, a Japanese police detective whose wife is kidnapped
- Lee Joon-gi as Han Ki-ju, a South Korean surgeon whose blind daughter is kidnapped
- Alice Ko as Christina Lin, a Taiwanese social media influencer whose husband is kidnapped
- Stanley Yau as Andy Wong, a Hong Kong lawyer whose sister is kidnapped
- Carrie Wong as Janice Lau, a Singaporean flight attendant whose fiance is kidnapped
- Joel Torre as Miguel Garcia, a Filipino taxi driver whose granddaughter is kidnapped
- Praew Narupornkamol Chaisang as Ayun Thanawan, a Thai hostess whose roommate is kidnapped
- Shinnosuke Mitsushima as Higa Kuranosuke, an Okinawan IT company founder whose mother is kidnapped

=== Recurring ===
- Show Kasamatsu as Urushibara Haruki, a mysterious man involved in the Kidnap Game
- Sae Okazaki as Isobe Akina, a journalist and friend of Saori
- Yuki Sakurai as Niide Saori, Toshiro's wife
- Machiko Ono as Uemura Sonomi, a food truck owner and friend of Saori
- Lee Seo-hwan as Park Dong-guk, a funeral director
- Kim Jae-kyung as Nam Ah-yoon, Ki-ju's wife
- Choi So Yool as Han ri-an, Ki-ju's blind daughter
- Sports Makita as Takatsuki Masaaki, Toshiro's detective partner
- Herman Keh as Tony Chan, Janice's fiance
- Hitomi Kyan as Higa Tomiko, Kuranosuke's mother
- Candy Wong as Sylvia Wong, Andy's sister

== Production ==
Filming of kiDnap GAME took place in multiple Asian locations, including Tokyo, Seoul, Hong Kong, Bangkok, Manila, Naha, and Taipei.

== Ratings ==
Average TV viewership ratings (nationwide)
Ep.	Original broadcast date	Average audience share (Nielsen Korea)
1	October 6, 2026	0.3% (39th)
2	October 13, 2026	0.3% (43rd)
3	October 20, 2026	0.3% (41st)
4	October 27, 2026	0.2% (58th)
5	November 3, 2026	0.2% (50th)
6	November 10, 2026	0.1% (72nd)
7	November 17, 2026	0.1% (60th)
8	November 24, 2026	
9	December 1, 2026	
10	December 8, 2026	
11	December 15, 2026	
Average		—
In the table above, the blue numbers represent the lowest ratings and the red numbers represent the highest ratings.; This drama airs on a cable channel/pay TV which normally has a relatively smaller audience compared to free-to-air TV/public broadcasters (KBS, SBS, MBC, and EBS).
