= Ossan's Love (2021 TV series) =

Hong Kong television drama series

- Traditional Chinese: 大叔的愛
- Simplified Chinese: 大叔的爱
- Jyutping: daai6 suk1 dik1 oi3
- Literal meaning: Uncle's Love
Transcriptions
Standard Mandarin
- Hanyu Pinyin: dàshū de ài
Yue: Cantonese
- Jyutping: daai6 suk1 dik1 oi3
- Genre: Comedy; BL
- Based on: Ossan's Love
- Written by: Tommy Lo; Chan Tsz-chun; Ho Siu-hong
- Directed by: Kwok Ka-hei
- Starring: Kenny Wong; Edan Lui; Anson Lo
- Composer: Choi Ching-hong
- Country of origin: Hong Kong
- Original language: Cantonese
- No. of episodes: 15

Production
- Executive producer: Lo Ting-fai
- Producer: Tommy Lo
- Running time: 60 minutes (including commercials)
- Production company: HK Television Entertainment

Original release
- Network: ViuTV
- Release: 28 June – 16 July 2021

Ossan's Love, also known as Ossan's Love HK, is a 2021 Hong Kong BL television drama produced by HK Television Entertainment for the broadcaster ViuTV. It is an adaptation of the 2018 Japanese television drama of the same name, a story about a young man who finds himself in a love triangle between his boss and his roommate. Both the original Japanese version and the Hong Kong adaptation are noted to be the first mainstream television dramas to feature gay romance as the central storyline in their respective regions.

== Synopsis ==
Tin (Edan Lui) has been single his whole life and is unsuccessful in having a girlfriend. One day, he discovers that his boss KK (Kenny Wong) secretly collects images of him, and learns that KK is in love with him. KK confesses, telling Tin that he will soon divorce his wife of 20 years, Francesca (Rachel Kan), to be with him. Tin confides to his friends, only to discover that his co-worker and flatmate, Muk (Anson Lo) is also in love with him. Deeply unsettled by their romantic pursuits, he follows advice from his childhood friend Tze-chin (Asha Cuthbert), admitting to KK that his only feelings toward him is that of respect and admiration for a mentor. Even though Tin has never ever thought about dating another man, he finds himself slowly falling for the caring and understanding Muk.

== Cast and characters ==
- Edan Lui of (MIRROR) as "Tin" Tin Yat Hung (田一雄), the protagonist who one day finds himself in the center of a love triangle between his boss and flatmate
- Anson Lo of (MIRROR) as "Muk" Ling Siu Muk (凌少牧), Tin's co-worker and flatmate who falls in love with him
- Kenny Wong as "KK" Chak Kwok Keung (翟國強), Tin's boss who is also in love with him
- Rachel Kan as Francesca Yuen (袁慧珠), KK's wife of 20 years
- Stanley Yau of (MIRROR) as Louis Lui (呂俊霖), Tin's casanova co-worker
- Florica Lin as Carmen Lai (賴嘉雯), Tin's nosy co-worker
- Colin Chan as Darren Chow (周政文), Tin's co-worker who has a past with Muk
- Asha Cuthbert as Fong Tze-chin (方梓芊), Tin's childhood friend
- Yeung Wai-lun as Pierre Fong (方梓平), Tze-chin's brother
- Crystal Cheung as Sis Tin, Tin's pregnant older sister
- Lulu Kai as Nancy, Rachel's tarot practitioner friend
- Dixon Wong as Chun, Tin's senior classmate
- Jessie Fong as Kiko, Chun's fiancée
- Kathy Wong as Kathy Ma (馬潔寧), SK's secret girlfriend, who is also a celebrity and is Muk's former classmate
- George Au of (P1X3L) as "SK" Wong Siu-kei (黃肇奇), a famous idol actor
- Marco Ip of (P1X3L) as Tin's co-worker
- Phoebus Ng of (P1X3L) as Tze-chin's Boyfriend

== Production ==
On 13 January 2021, Hong Kong media reported ViuTV's intentions of adapting Asahi TV's hit 2018 television series Ossan's Love, which was an expansion of the 2016 television special of the same name. The original Ossan's Love was inspired by producer Sari Kijima's own experience of being pursued by a female friend. Rather than writing the series as a forbidden love affair between men, scriptwriter Koji Tokuo shaped the story as a genuine romance featuring men instead of a cis male-female couple, therefore avoiding homophobia.

Ossan's Love quietly commenced filming in late January, in the midst of the COVID-19 pandemic. On 8 February 2021, ViuTV confirmed the adaptation through a press conference, officially announcing the casting of Kenny Wong and Mirror members Edan Lui and Anson Lo. Per producer and writer Tommy Lo, the HK version is an expanded version of the original 7-part series, extending the story to 15 one-hour episodes whilst adding more subplots involving its secondary characters.

Anson Lo was the first to be cast, followed by Edan Lui. Kenny Wong was the first choice to play KK. Rachel Kan, who has been living in Vancouver, flew back to Hong Kong to film the show and had to undergo a three-week quarantine. Ossan's Love is Kan's first ViuTV drama.

== Soundtrack ==
Background tracks are written by Choi Ching-hong. The opening theme "Sudden Feeling of a Heartbeat" (突如其來的心跳感覺) is performed by main leads Edan Lui and Anson Lo, written by Raymond Wan with lyrics by T-rexx. The ending theme (since episode 8) is "Unlovable Leader" (不可愛教主) performed by Anson Lo, written by Key Ng and Y.Siu, with lyrics by Riley Lam.

== Episodes ==
No.	Title	Original release date
1	"Surprise Confession (驚喜表白)"	28 June 2021
2	"First Kiss in the Bathroom (浴室之初吻)"	29 June 2021
3	"The Battle for Tin (阿田爭奪戰)"	30 June 2021
4	"Who is Tina? (誰是Tina?)"	1 July 2021
5	"A Secret That Can't Be Told (不能説的祕密)"	2 July 2021
6	"Blood is Thicker Than Water (上陣不離父子兵)"	5 July 2021
7	"Tze-chin Gets Involved (梓芊介入)"	6 July 2021
8	"Childhood Friends (青梅竹馬)"	7 July 2021
9	"Boyfriend (男朋友)"	8 July 2021
10	"Secret Relationship (戀情不公開)"	9 July 2021
11	"Counterattack of KK's Love (KK愛之反擊)"	12 July 2021
12	"Meet the Parents (見家長)"	13 July 2021
13	"Tin and Muk's Test (田與牧的考驗)"	14 July 2021
14	"I Do! Do You? (我願意！你願意嗎？)"	15 July 2021
15	"Tin Yat-hung's Choice (田一雄的訣擇)"	16 July 2021

== Reception ==
Ossan's Love took over the time slot of ViuTV's reality show Beauty and the Best, and premiered on 28 June 2021 to generally positive reviews. The premiere week averaged 6.4 viewership points (approximately 420,000 people), and peaked at 8.7 points (570,000 viewers), making Ossan's Love ViuTV's highest-rated television drama since the broadcaster's public inception in 2016. Ratings increased to 6.9 points on the second week, and 7.9 points on the final week.

=== Cultural impact ===
Ossan's Love is the first mainstream Hong Kong television drama to focus on gay relationships and same-sex marriage, and is credited for subtly reshaping Hong Kong's political landscape in regard to LGBT issues. According to associate professor Denise Tang of Lingnan University, the show "has provided space for people to start being curious," and is slowly changing public reception of sexual minority groups, which are often marginalised by local Hong Kong media. Jerome Yau, chief executive of LGBT group Pink Alliance, argued that many officials have started to become more careful when using terminology for LGBT.

The show has caught the attention of Hong Kong's political sphere. Pro-Beijing Hong Kong legislator Junius Ho accused the series of violating the Chinese government's desire for a three child policy by promoting childless relationships, and stated that it therefore that would "breach China's national security law." Hong Kong's chief executive Carrie Lam stated that the show's popularity did not suggest that Hong Kongers would support gay rights.
