= Kenny Wong =

Hong Kong actor

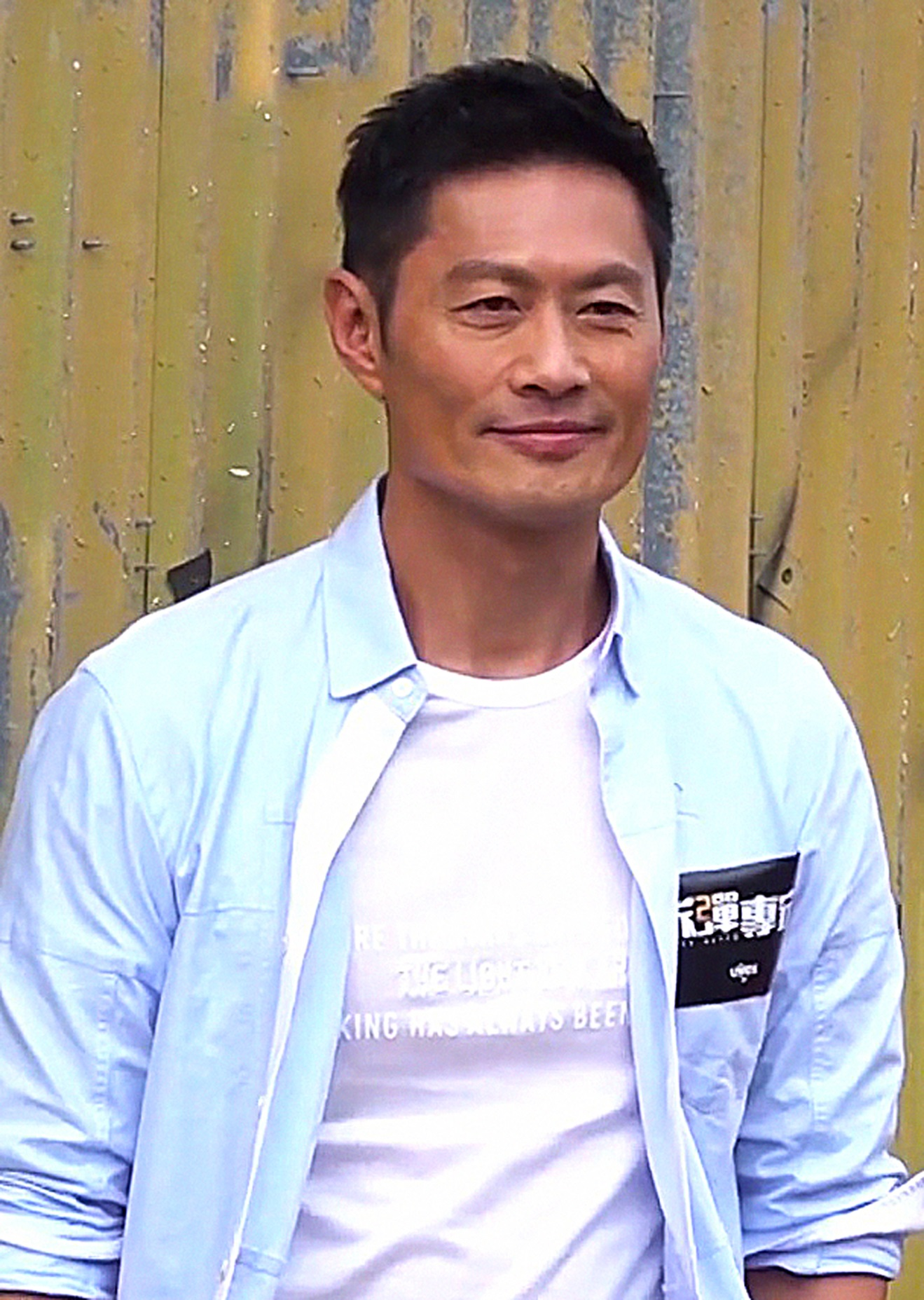
- Wong in 2019
- Born: 30 April 1963 (age 63); British Hong Kong
- Occupations: Actor; assistant director; model
- Years active: 1987–present
- Height: 1.81 m (5 ft 11 1/2 in)
- Awards: TVB Anniversary Awards – Best Supporting Actor; 2006 The Dance of Passion

Chinese name
- Traditional Chinese: 黃德斌
- Simplified Chinese: 黄德斌
Transcriptions
Standard Mandarin
- Hanyu Pinyin: Huáng Débīn
Yue: Cantonese
- Jyutping: Wong4 Dak1 Ban1

Wong Tak-bun (born 30 April 1963), known internationally as Kenny Wong, is a Hong Kong actor.

== Filmography ==
=== Film ===
Year	Title	Role	Notes
2015	From Vegas to Macau II	Interpol	
2016	Cold War 2	Stephen Han	
2017	Colour of the Game	Chan Ka Wai	
2018	Men on the Dragon	Lai Ka Tai	Nominated — Movie6 People's Choice Hong Kong Film Awards for Best Supporting Actor Nominated — 38th Hong Kong Film Awards for Best Supporting Actor
2020	Breakout Brothers	Warden Tang	
2020	Shock Wave 2	EOD Chan King-To	
2020	The Infernal Walker	Leung Cheuk-sang	
2021	Ink at Tai Ping	Yip Koi-tin	Nominated — People's Choice Television Awards for Best Actor
2021	Raging Fire	Tai Cheuk-yin	
2022	Breakout Brothers 2	Warden Tang	
2022	Breakout Brothers 3	Warden Tang	
2022	Chilli Laugh Story	KK	
2022	Just 1 Day	Himself	
2023	One More Chance	Tai Zhi Kei	
2023	Death Notice	Ah Long	
2023	The Brotherhood of Rebel	Yao Gor	
2023	Cyber Heist	Frankie Fan Tak-fu	

=== Television ===
Year	Title	Role	Notes
2004	War and Beauty		
2006	The Dance of Passion	Sung Tung-Yeung	Su Long-Yuet's husband. Ka Chun-Fun's ex-husband.
2006	C.I.B. Files	Hung Ho-Yeung (William Hung)	C.I.B. C Team Officer
2007	On the First Beat	Hon Chin-Kuen	Lee Man-Sing and Chung King-Fung's friend
2008-2009	The Gem of Life	Sunny Yau	Calvin Ko's friend/business partner/admirer. Sylvia Hong's ex-husband and friend. Revealed to be a homosexual.
2009	The Threshold of a Persona	Wu Kit-Sam	
2010	Fly with Me	Edmond	CID
2010-2011	Links to Temptation	Ko Chung-wing	Villain
2011	Grace Under Fire	Fok Koon-wai	Mizongyi practitioner
2011	Be Home for Dinner	Gong Bun	
2011-2012	When Heaven Burns	Ronnie	Bassist
2012	Let It Be Love	Cyrus	
2012	Gloves Come Off	Ko Wai Ting	Muay Thai gym owner
2012	Master of Play	Eric Kau	Bar owner
2012	Tiger Cubs	Chun Sum	Robber (episodes 2-3)
2012	The Last Steep Ascent	Cheng Kiu	Medicinal herb farmer
2012	Come Home Love	Eric Kau	Coffee shop owner
2013	Beauty at War	Tung Kat Hoi	Palace inmate
2013	Karma Rider	Silent Hero	Cameo
2014	Ruse of Engagement	Ko Wai (Wai Sir)	
2014	ICAC Investigators 2014	Chow Sir	Appears in Case #5
2014	Tomorrow Is Another Day	Donald Yung Wai Chun	Principal Officer of Rehabillation Unit, CSD (Correctional Service Department).
2015	Master of Destiny	Cho Chi-wan	
2015-2016	The Executioner	Yip Sheung-luk	Nominated — People's Choice Television Awards for Best Actor (Top 6)
2016	Speed of Life	To Cheuk-fung	Chief Inspector of the E&C Unit
2016	Dead Wrong	Lam Ho-yan	
2017	Line Walker: The Prelude	Pak-Key Gor	Guest Star from episode 1 to 5 Thailand gang leader Friend & boss of Lok Siu Fung Tried to help Chum Foon Hei but died in episode 5, killed in car crash driven by a high man (Semi-Villain)
2019	Police Tactical Unit	Neighbour and villain	Appearance in episode 22 and onwards. He wanted revenge against the PTU.
2021	Ossan's Love	KK Chak Kwok-keung	Nominated — People's Choice Television Awards for Best Actor (Top 5); Nominated — People's Choice Television Awards for Best TV Drama Partnership (with Edan Lui and Anson Lo, Top 5)
2022	Forensic JD	Yeung Hoi Fung	Head of HDMI
