= Serrini =

Hong Kong singer-songwriter

Serrini 梁嘉茵
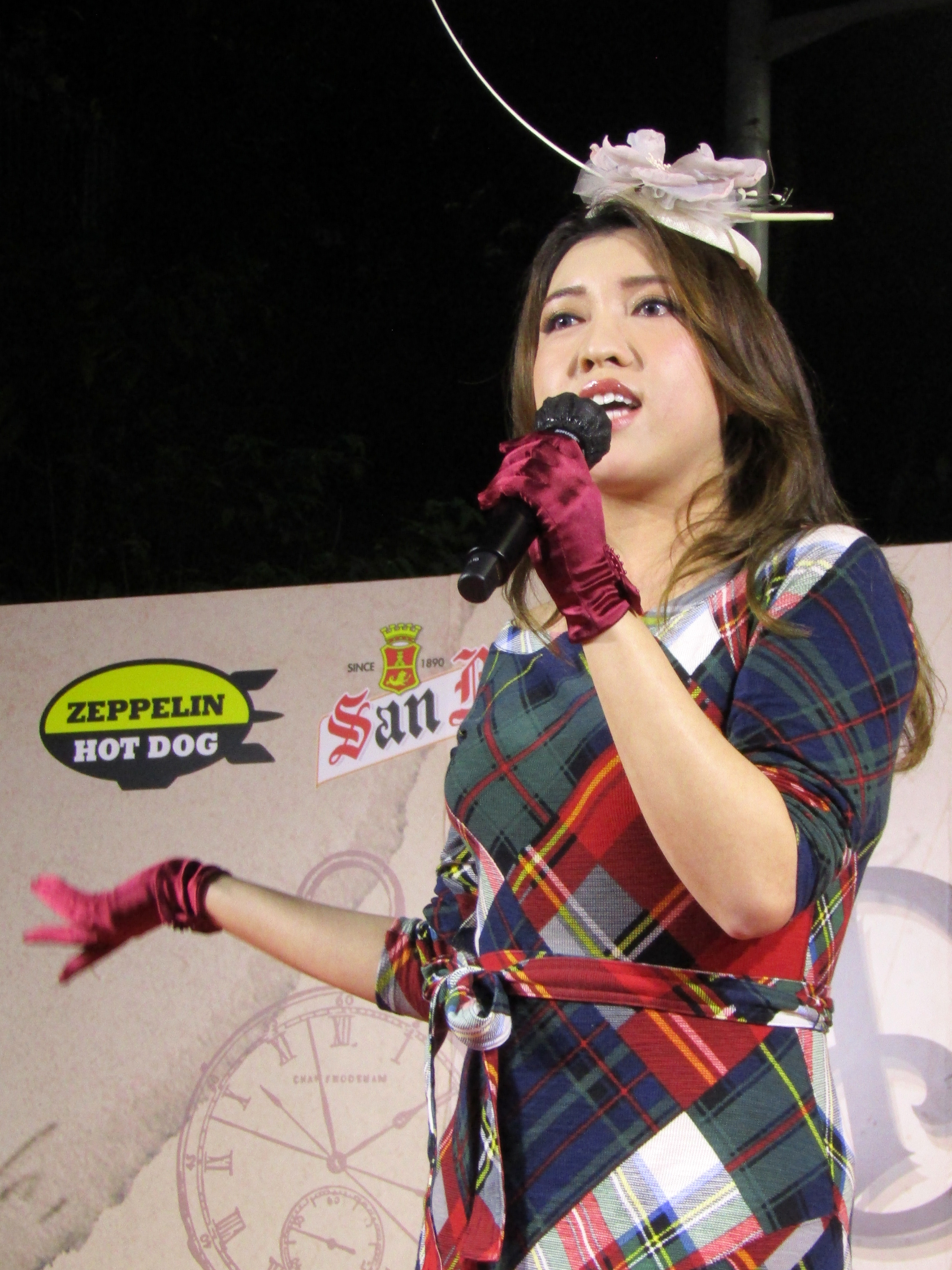
- Serrini in 2023.

Background information
- Born: Leung Ka-yan; 13 August 1990 (age 35); British Hong Kong
- Genres: Cantopop; alternative pop; R&B
- Occupation: Singer-songwriter
- Instruments: Vocal; guitar
- Years active: 2011–present
- Website: www.jengsbunka.com

Chinese name
- Chinese: 梁嘉茵
Transcriptions
Standard Mandarin
- Hanyu Pinyin: Liáng Jiā Yīn
Yue: Cantonese
- Jyutping: Loeng^{4} Gaa^{1} Jan^{1}

Leung Ka-yan (Chinese: 梁嘉茵; born 13 August 1990), better known by her stage name Serrini, is a Hong Kong independent songwriter-singer who started her singing career in 2012. In recent years, her songs mostly relate to current affairs and romantic relationships among young people.

Serrini graduated from Chinese University of Hong Kong with a bachelor's degree in English and studied at a Master of Arts program at the University of Hong Kong. She received a Doctor of Philosophy (Literary and Cultural Studies) degree from the University of Hong Kong. The South China Morning Post's Henry Lau said that Serrini "has a strong connection with her audience, owing to her unique and fun lyrics covering a wide range of themes, from love to current affairs, through refreshing and catchy tunes".

In January 2022, local media reported that ten Canto-pop singers and groups had been put on a blacklist of government-funded broadcaster RTHK, with radio DJs having been ordered not to play their songs. Serrini was reportedly on the list.
