= Anson Lo =

Hong Kong singer, dancer, and actor

- 盧瀚霆
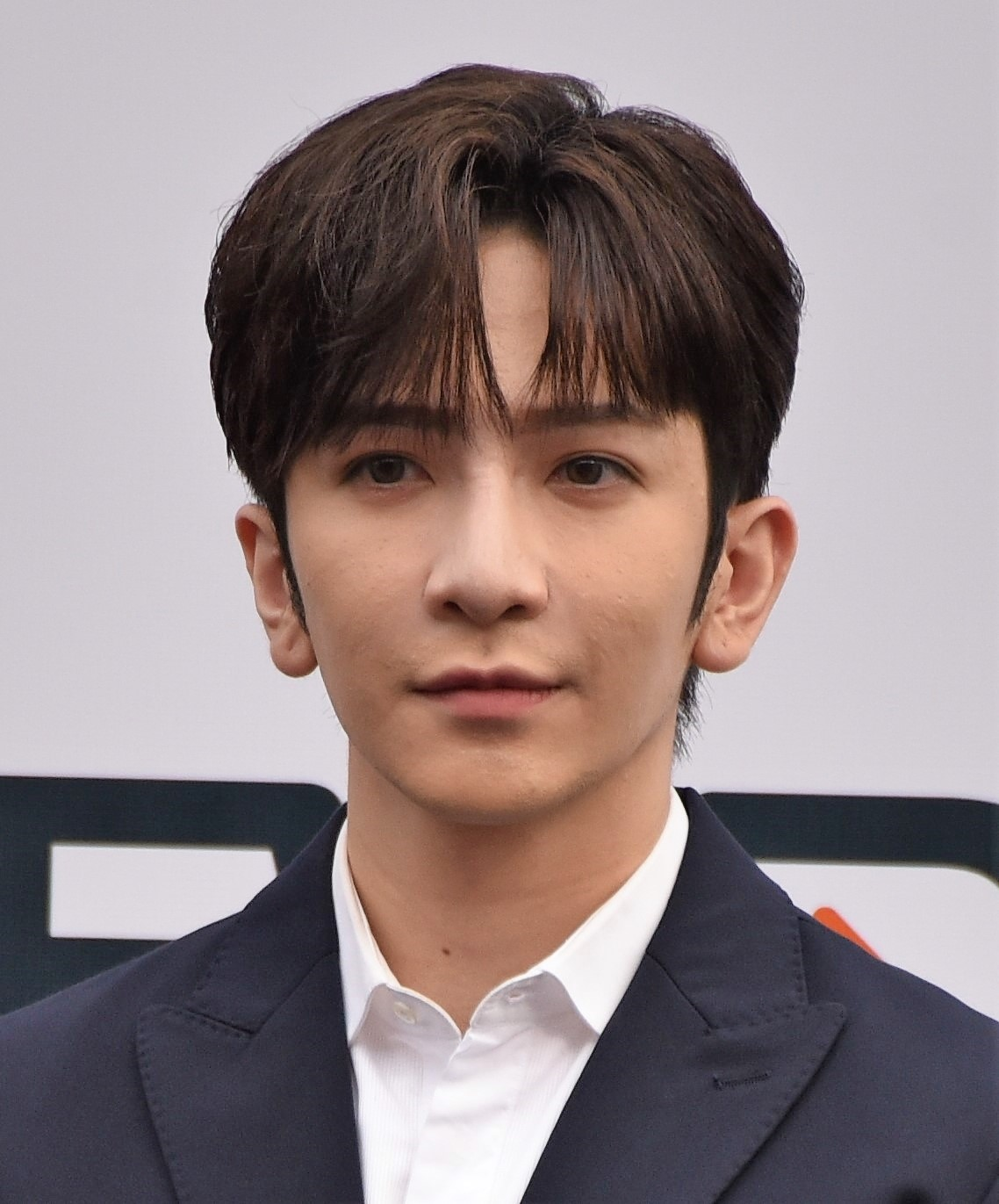
- Lo in 2023
- Born: 7 July 1995 (age 31); British Hong Kong
- Occupations: Singer; dancer; actor
- Years active: 2018–present
- Agents: HKTVE; MakerVille
- Height: 176 cm (5 ft 9 in)
- Musical career
- Genres: Cantopop; pop; dance pop
- Instruments: Vocals; piano
- Label: Music Nation
- Member of: Mirror

Chinese name
- Traditional Chinese: 盧瀚霆
- Simplified Chinese: 卢瀚霆
Transcriptions
Standard Mandarin
- Hanyu Pinyin: Lú Hàntíng
- Bopomofo: ㄌㄨˊㄏㄢˋㄊㄧㄥˊ
Yue: Cantonese
- Jyutping: lou^{4} hon^{6} ting^{4}
- IPA: [lɔw˩ hɔn˨ tʰɪŋ˩]

Anson Lo Hon-ting (Chinese: 盧瀚霆; born 7 July 1995) is a Hong Kong singer, dancer and actor. In 2018, Anson Lo made his debut as a member of the Hong Kong boy group Mirror. Anson Lo made his solo debut in February 2020 with his first single "A Lifelong Mission" (一所懸命). In 2021, he won the Best New Asian Artist Award at the 2021 Mnet Asian Music Awards (MAMA).

== Early life ==
Anson Lo was born on 7 July 1995 in Hong Kong. He has one older sister. Lo attended Shak Chung Shan Memorial Catholic Primary School and Po Leung Kuk Lo Kit Sing (1983) College. He went on to study a Bachelor of Business Administration (Business Analysis) at the City University of Hong Kong. Lo dropped out in his third year of university to pursue a career as a dance instructor.

== Career ==
=== 2018–present: Mirror ===
Prior to his debut, Lo was a dance instructor and a backup dancer. He has performed as a backup dancer for Aaron Kwok, Kelly Chen and Coco Lee. In 2018, he was persuaded by ViuTV producer Ahfa Wong to audition for the reality television talent competition Good Night Show – King Maker (Chinese: 全民造星), of which Wong was the producer. Lo was directly promoted to the second round (top 55) as one of the five winners of 'Eye Catching Idol' through fan vote. He made it to the top 30, but was eliminated in the fourth round.

On 3 November 2018, Lo made his debut as a member of boy group, Mirror, at a press conference with their debut single "In a Second" (一秒間). His position is the main dancer and English rapper. His fans are known as "Sonto" (plural: Sontos) (神徒).

On 5 July 2019, Lo released the promotional single "B.M.G. (Be My Girl)" with Mirror member Keung To.

In King Maker II, Lo won the Professional Competitor Award.

=== 2020–present: Solo activities ===
On 29 February 2020, Lo made his solo debut with his first single "A Lifelong Mission" (一所懸命). Lo penned the lyrics to his second single, "Burn Out", released on 12 August 2020. His third single "Corner Creatures" (角落生物) was released on 14 October 2020. Lo made his acting debut in the 2020 youth sport television drama series We are the Littles as Bobby Chan Yat-long (陳逸朗). The drama also featured Lo's fourth single "Teammate" (神隊友) as the sub song. At the 2020 Ultimate Song Chart Awards Presentation, Lo won the Best Newcomer Bronze Award. He also won the Best New Artist Gold Award at the 43rd RTHK Top 10 Gold Song Awards in January 2021.

His fifth single "EGO" was released on 5 February 2021. In June 2021, Lo gained widespread recognition and skyrocketed in popularity starring as Ling Siu-muk (凌少牧) in the Hong Kong adaptation of Japanese romantic comedy drama Ossan's Love. On 7 July 2021, Lo released his sixth single, "Unlovable Leader" (不可愛教主), which also served as the ending theme song of Ossan's Love. The music video for "Unlovable Leader" surpassed 10 million views in four months. In September 2021, Lo made a guest appearance in the Taiwanese drama Sometimes When We Touch as Cheng Yat-fei (鄭一飛), and also sang the ending theme song with Keung To. On 22 September 2021, Lo released his seventh single, "Megahit", which became his first single to top three Hong Kong mainstream music charts and was awarded Ultimate Song No.9 at the 2021 Ultimate Song Chart Awards Presentation and Best Song of the Year at the Chill Club Music Awards 21/22. A remix version, "Megahit Megamix", with rap lyrics penned by Lo was also released on 1 December 2021. On 25 November 2021, Lo made his official film debut as Lui Tsz-ging (雷紫荊) in Showbiz Spy, which made the top ten highest-grossing domestic films in Hong Kong in 2021. On 7 and 8 December, Lo along with Mirror members, Keung To, Edan Lui, Ian Chan, Anson Kong, and Jer Lau headlined the concert, "MOOV LIVE Music on the Road". On 11 December 2021, Lo won the Best New Asian Artist Award (Mandarin) at the renowned 2021 Mnet Asian Music Awards (MAMA), marking his first time to receive international recognition.

On 25 February 2022, Lo released his eighth single, "Mr. Stranger". On 8 June 2022, he released his ninth single, "King Kong", for which he also directed the music video for the first time. On 12 November 2022, Lo released his tenth single, which was titled as his primary school address, "39 Wing Shun Street" (永順街39號), to convey a story about puppy love. On 13 November 2022, Lo and singer Joyce Cheng, headlined the 903 Music is Live Concert, titled "神の拉闊". In December 2022, Lo starred in the drama series Million Dollar Family as Ng Ziu-ming (吳照明), and also sang the theme song. At the 2022 Ultimate Song Chart Awards Presentation, Lo won the coveted My Favourite Male Singer Award for the first time.

On 20 January 2023, Lo was invited by Universal Music Hong Kong to participate in the project Remembering Leslie, to mark the 20th anniversary of the death of the Hong Kong icon Leslie Cheung, covering Cheung's original song, "An Affair" (偷情). On 22 February 2023, Lo released his eleventh single, "MONEY". On 10 April 2023, a crossover version of "MONEY" with Dear Jane was released. On 12 June 2023, Lo released his twelfth single, "Nah". On 21 July 2023, he released the single, "Romance Kills Cancer" (浪漫殺死巨蟹座). On 23–26 July 2023, Lo held his first solo concert, "ANSON LO "THE STAGE" IN MY SIGHT SOLO CONCERT 2023", at AsiaWorld–Arena, with all 4 shows sold out.

On 24 August 2023, the film It Remains was released with Lo starring in the lead role as Cheung Tsz-kit (張子傑). On 4 October 2023, Lo released the single, "ON". In November 2023, Lo starred as Timo Keung Tai-mo (姜泰武) in the Hong Kong adaptation of the Korean romantic comedy Business Proposal, and also took part in singing the drama's theme songs.

On 10 January 2024, Lo released the single, "MY LIFE". On 9 February 2024, the heist thriller film The Moon Thieves was theatrically released, with Lo starring as Lam Gam-yoh (李錦佑). On 17 April 2024, he released the single, "The Homebodies" (深閨). A duet version featuring Kelly Chen was later released. On 17 July 2024, Lo released the summer-themed single, "Hey Hey OK!". The song was later awarded 8th place of the Top 10 Ultimate Songs at the 2024 Ultimate Song Chart Awards Presentation. On 23 October 2024, he released the song, "Me" (致我).

On 6-10 December 2025, Lo held his second solo concert, "ANSON LO "KINGDOM" LIVE 2025" at AsiaWorld-Arena, with all five shows sold out. At the same time, Lo released his first album Kingdom, which sold out shortly.

In February 2026 Lo was invited by Avantgardey to dance OKP. The dance collaboration showed perfect synchronization and reach million views within a few hours.

==== Fashion ====
On 27 January 2023, Lo launched his own clothing brand, ALLOVER.

Lo attended the 'Jennie for Calvin Klein' event in Seoul on 10 May 2023. Lo attended the Louis Vuitton Menswear Pre-Fall 2024 Show on 30 November 2023 in Hong Kong.

He was named as one of the honourees of Tatler Asia’s Most Stylish 2023, and Prestige 40 under 40 2023.

Lo attended the Spring/Summer 2025 show for KENZO at Paris Fashion Week in June 2024.

Lo attended the Giuseppe Zanotti Fall/Winter Presentation 2025 at Milan Fashion week in February 2025. It was also announced that the brand would be collaborating with Lo to release an exclusive capsule collection, named 'Giuseppe for Anson Lo'.

== Discography ==
=== Singles ===
==== As lead artist ====
Year	Title	Peak chart positions	Notes
Year	Title	Billboard HK	Notes
2020	"A Lifelong Mission" (一所懸命)	—	Solo debut
2020	"Burn Out"	—	
2020	"Corner Creatures" (角落生物)	—	
2020	"Teammate" (神隊友)	—	Sub theme song for We are the Littles
2021	"EGO"	—	
2021	"Unlovable Leader" (不可愛教主)	—	Ending theme song for Ossan's Love
2021	"Megahit"	11	
2021	"Megahit Megamix"	—	Megahit remix
2022	"Mr. Stranger"	9	
2022	"King Kong"	13	
2022	"39 Wing Shun Street" (永順街39號)	8	
2022	"Cohabiting Strangers" (同居陌生人)	—	Theme song for Million Dollar Family
2023	"An Affair" (偷情)	19	Cover of Leslie Cheung's original song
2023	"MONEY"	6	
2023	"Nah"	22	
2023	"Romance Kills Cancer" (浪漫殺死巨蟹座)	21	
2023	"ON"	23	
2023	"Special Date Ceremony" (特別約會儀式)	—	Sub theme song for Business Proposal
2024	"MY LIFE"	20	
2024	"The Homebodies" (深閨)	2	
2024	"Hey Hey OK!"	12	
2024	"Me" (致我)	13	
2025	"Heartbreaker"	11	
2025	"The Time Is Always Now" (你都有今日)	5	
2025	"Lemonade"	5	
2025	"Gimme Gimme"	7	
2025	"Take That"		
2025	"Rude Boy"		
2025	"Trippin' Up"		1st English song with lyrics written by Anson Lo
2025	"To My Companion" (我的支持型伴侶")	22	
2026	"Charisma"	8	
2026	"Destiny" (本命)	8	
2026	"The Last Parachute"(最後一個降落傘)	3	
2026	"Helicopter"	7	English song with lyrics written by Anson Lo
	"goofy"		
	"Midnight Escape"		

==== Collaborations ====
Year	Title	Notes
2019	"B.M.G. - Be My Girl" (with Keung To)	
2021	"Sudden Feeling of a Heartbeat" (突如其來的心跳感覺) (with Edan Lui)	Theme song for Ossan's Love
2021	"Love Doesn't Make a Sound" (愛不作聲) (with Keung To)	Ending theme song for Sometimes When We Touch
2023	"MONEY (Anson Lo x Dear Jane)"	
2023	"The Space Between You and I" (我與你的差距) (with Edan Lui)	Theme song for Business Proposal
2024	"The Homebodies feat. Kelly Chen" (深閨 feat. 陳慧琳)	

== Filmography ==
=== Television series ===
Year	Title	Original Title	Role	Notes
2019	Retire to Queen	退休女皇	Kam Dou-fu (金道夫)	Cameo appearance (episode 1,11,18–20)
2020	We are the Littles	男排女將	Bobby Chan Yat-long (陳逸朗)	Major supporting role
2021	Ossan's Love (HK)	大叔的愛	Ling Siu-muk (凌少牧)	Main role
2021	Sometimes When We Touch	超感應學園	Cheng Yat-fei (鄭一飛)	Special appearance (episode 1, 5–6)
2022	We Got Game	季前賽	Siu Ming (小明)	Special appearance (episode 3, 7–8,11,14)
2022	Million Dollar Family	百萬同居計劃	Ng Ziu-ming (吳照明)	Main role
2023	Business Proposal (HK)	社內相親	Timo Keung Tai-mo (姜泰武)	Main role
2026	The Season		Anson Lo	Special appearance
2027	What's Wrong with Secretary Kim	金秘書為何那樣	李英俊	Main role

=== Film ===
Year	Title	Original Title	Role	Notes
2021	Showbiz Spy	假冒女團	Cercis Lui Tsz-ging (雷紫荊)	Main role
2022	Hong Kong Family	過時·過節	Cheuk Zai (雀仔)	Supporting role
2023	It Remains	釀魂	Finn Cheung Tsz-kit (張子傑)	Main role
2024	The Moon Thieves	盜月者	Lee Gam-yoh (李錦佑)	Main role
2024	We 12	12怪盜	A.Lo	

=== Variety show ===
Year	Title	Original Title	Notes
2018	Good Night Show – King Maker	Good Night Show 全民造星	Contestant No. 91; Eliminated in the fourth round (Top 30)
2018	Mirror Go	—N/a	
2019	Mirror Go 2	—N/a	
2019	King Maker II	全民造星II	
2019	The Haunted Rooms 4	入住請敲門4	
2021	Battle Feel	考有Feel	
2021	Be a Better MIRROR	調教你MIRROR	
2021	Be My Goddess	神的女主角	
2023	Shiny Summer – MIRROR+	全星暑假 – MIRROR+	
2023	MIRROR Time	—N/a	
2024	Mirror Chef	—N/a	
2025	Strawberry Seoul Time	呂濤米Lo Seoul	
2025	Strawberry Heartfelt Chat	呂濤米Lo 花Son Show	

=== Music video appearances ===
Year	Title	Artist	Notes	Ref.
2018	"打字機"	Kelly Chen	As backup dancer, prior to debut	
2018	"Time To Go"	Angie Shum	As backup dancer, prior to debut	
2020	"蒙著嘴說愛你"	Keung To		
2022	"Elevator"	Edan Lui		

== Concerts ==
=== Solo ===
Year	Date	Name	No. of Shows	Venue	Ref.
2023	23–26 July	ANSON LO "THE STAGE" IN MY SIGHT SOLO CONCERT 2023	4	AsiaWorld–Arena	
2025	6–10 December	ANSON LO "KINGDOM" LIVE 2025	5	AsiaWorld–Arena	
2026	3-4 July	ANSON LO "KINGDOM" LIVE TOUR 2026 - MACAO	2	The Londoner Arena	

=== Collaborations ===
Year	Date	Name	Venue	Collaborating Artist(s)
2021	7–8 December	MOOV LIVE Music on the Road	Hall 5BC, HKCEC	Anson Kong, Edan Lui, Ian Chan, Jer Lau, Keung To
2022	13 November	903 Music is Live Concert "神の拉闊"	AsiaWorld–Arena	Joyce Cheng
2025	13, 16 February	Katch the Pop SUNMI x ANSON LO x JEREMY	AsiaWorld–Arena	Sunmi, Jeremy Lee
2025	31 August	Waterbomb Singapore 2025	Siloso Beach, Sentosa	2NE1, Jay B, Junny, Ash Island, Estelle Fly
2025	18 October	JOOX TOP MUSIC NIGHT	One Bangkok Forum, Bangkok	ALLY, BILLKIN, BUTTERBEAR, JAYLERR, MEENTRA KUN, MEYOU, mikah, NexTIDE, PESES, PiXXiE, PP KRIT, THE TOYS, TIA RAY, JEMMERY LEE, EDAN LUI, KEUNG TO
2025	1 November	Chill Genki Music Festival	Wonderland, WestK	PUFFY, Masatoshi Ono, adieu, Endy Chow, Jay Fung, Edan Lui, Jeremy Lee, Keung To
2025	31 December	King Maker Fest Countdown to 2026	Macau Studio City Event Center	Mirror, Error, Collar, Lyman, Rover, P1X3L, 5G
2026	1 January	Mirror First Day 2026	Macau Studio City Event Center	Anson Kong, Frankie Chan, Alton Wong, Lokman Yeung, Stanley Yau, Jer Lau, Ian Chan, Jeremy Lee, Edan Lui, Keung To, Tiger Yau
2026	4-5 April	Music Unbounded Live Macau	Macau Studio City Event Center	Edan Lui

=== Guest Appearance ===
Year	Date	Name	Venue
2021	20 June	Serrini "I'M (NOT) FINE, THX." Live 2021	Star Hall, KITEC
2022	11 June	"Between Us" Joyce Cheng Concert 2022	Hong Kong Coliseum
2023	30 April	FWD Champions Day	Sha Tin Racecourse
2024	4 February	Tatler XFEST Hong Kong Team vs Inter Miami	Hong Kong Stadium
2024	5 October	MATCHICAL LIVE 2024	HALL 5BC, HKCEC
2024	24 November	Liza Wang: A Diva In Concert 2024	Hong Kong Coliseum
2025	12 July	Kelly Chen Season Two Live in Hong Kong	Hong Kong Coliseum
2025	17 August	EDAN LUI "e to E" LIVE 2025	AsiaWorld–Arena
2025	20 September	THE FACT MUSIC AWARDS 2025	Macao Outdoor Performance Venue
2025	15 October	Show Champion	MBC Dream Center

== Awards and nominations ==
Year	Award	Category	Nominee / Work	Result
2020	43rd RTHK Top 10 Gold Songs Awards	Best New Artist	Anson Lo	Gold
2020	Metro Radio Hit Awards 2020	Best New Artist	Anson Lo	Won
2020	2020 Ultimate Song Chart Awards Presentation	Best Newcomer	Anson Lo	Bronze
2020	Joox Top Music Awards 2020	Joox Top Recommended New Artist	Anson Lo	Won
2020	Yahoo! Asia Buzz Awards 2020	Best Newcomer	Anson Lo	Won
2021	2021 Mnet Asian Music Awards	Best New Asian Artist (Mandarin)	Anson Lo	Won
2021	2021 Metro Radio Music Awards	Metro Hit Popular Idol	Anson Lo	Won
2021	2021 Ultimate Song Chart Awards Presentation	Top 10 Ultimate Songs	"Megahit"	9th
2021	2021 Ultimate Song Chart Awards Presentation	My Favourite Male Singer	Anson Lo	Top 5
2021	2021 Ultimate Song Chart Awards Presentation	My Favourite Song	"Megahit"	Top 5
2021	Joox Top Music Awards 2021	Joox Top 10 Recommended Songs	"Unlovable Leader" (不可愛教主)	4th
2021	Joox Top Music Awards 2021	Joox Top Recommended OST	"Sudden Feeling of a Heartbeat" (突如其來的心跳感覺) with Edan Lui	2nd
2021	Joox Top Music Awards 2021	Joox Listeners' Favourite Song 2021	"Megahit"	Won
2022	Chill Club Chart Award Presentation 21/22	Chill Club Male Singer of the Year	Anson Lo	Gold
2022	Chill Club Chart Award Presentation 21/22	Chill Club Best Song of the Year	"Megahit"	Won
2022	The 4th KKBox Hong Kong Music Awards	Top 10 Artists of the Year	Anson Lo	Won
2022	Yahoo Asia Multiverse Buzz Awards 2022	Top 10 Popular Songs	"Megahit"	Won
2022	Metro Radio Hit Awards 2022	Metro Hit Popular Singer	Anson Lo	Won
2022	2022 Ultimate Song Chart Awards Presentation	My Favourite Male Singer	Anson Lo	Won
2022	2022 Ultimate Song Chart Awards Presentation	My Favourite Song	"Mr. Stranger"	Top 5
2023	Chill Club Chart Award Presentation 22/23	Chill Club Male Singer of the Year	Anson Lo	Gold
2023	Chill Club Chart Award Presentation 22/23	Chill Club Pop Song of the Year	"39 Wing Shun Street" (永順街39號)	Won
2023	The 5th KKBox Hong Kong Music Awards	Top 10 Artists of the Year	Anson Lo	Won
2023	2023 Ultimate Song Chart Awards Presentation	My Favourite Male Singer	Anson Lo	Top 5
2023	2023 Ultimate Song Chart Awards Presentation	My Favourite Song	"MONEY"	Top 5
2024	Chill Club Chart Award Presentation 23/24	Chill Club Male Singer of the Year	Anson Lo	Won
2024	Chill Club Chart Award Presentation 23/24	Chill Club Pop Song of the Year	"Romance Kills Cancer" (浪漫殺死巨蟹座)	Won
2024	Chill Club Chart Award Presentation 23/24	Chill Club Dance Pop Song of the Year	"MONEY"	Won
2024	The 6th KKBox Hong Kong Music Awards	Top 10 Artists of the Year	Anson Lo	Won
2024	2024 Ultimate Song Chart Awards Presentation	Top 10 Ultimate Songs	"Hey Hey OK!"	8th
2024	2024 Ultimate Song Chart Awards Presentation	My Favourite Male Singer	Anson Lo	Top 5
2024	2024 Ultimate Song Chart Awards Presentation	My Favourite Song	"Hey Hey OK!"	Top 5
2025	2025 Ultimate Song Chart Awards Presentation	My Favourite Male Singer	Anson Lo	Top 5
2025	2025 Ultimate Song Chart Awards Presentation	My Favourite Song	"Lemonade"	Top 5
2025	Metro Radio Hit Awards 2025	The Most Popular Male Singer on the Internet	Anson Lo	Won
2025	Chill Club Chart Award Presentation 24/25	Most Popular Song of the Year	"Hey Hey OK!"	Won
2025	Chill Club Chart Award Presentation 24/25	Most Popular Singer	Anson Lo	Won
2025	Chill Club Chart Award Presentation 24/25	Male Singer of the Year	Anson Lo	Gold
2026	Chill Club Chart Award Presentation 25/26	Most Popular Song of the Year	"The Time Is Always Now" (你都有今日)	Won
2026	Chill Club Chart Award Presentation 25/26	Most Popular Singer	Anson Lo	Won
2026	Chill Club Chart Award Presentation 25/26	Male Singer of the Year	Anson Lo	Silver
