= Liao dynasty =

Khitan-led dynasty of China (916–1125)

Great Liao 大遼 Khitan State 囯 / 契丹國
- 916–1125
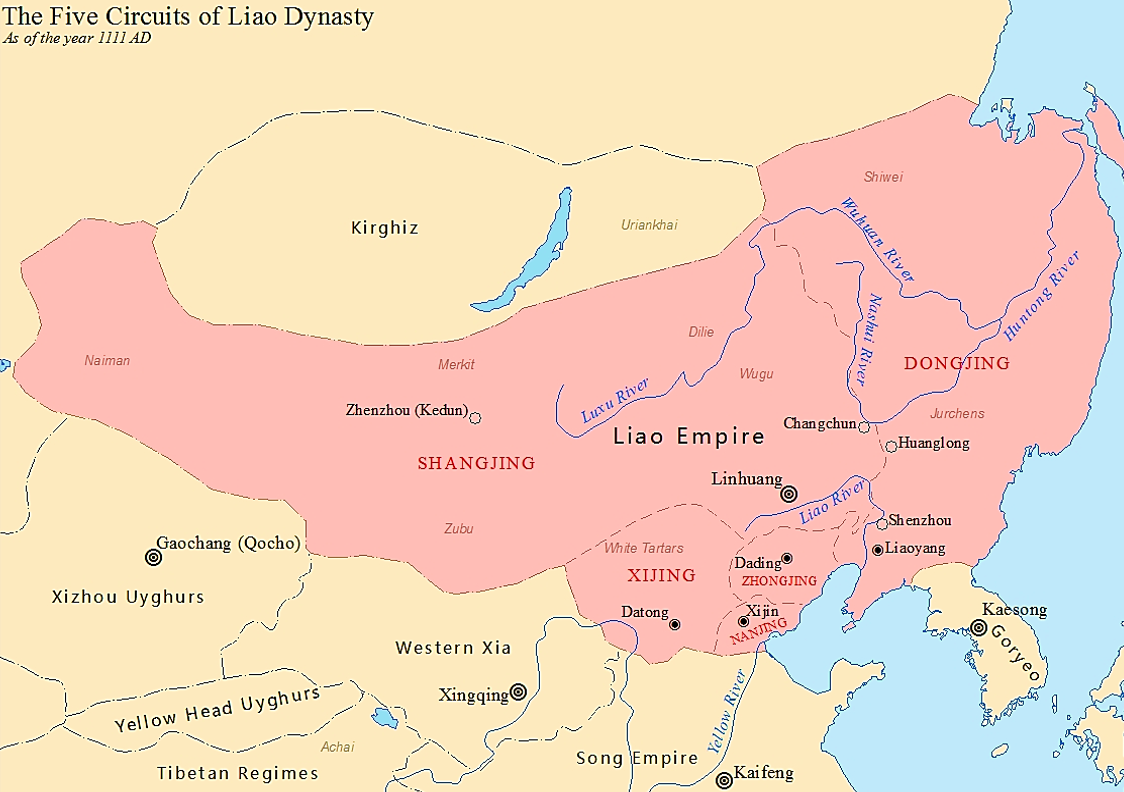
- Liao circuits, c. 1111
- Capital: Shangjing
- Common languages: Khitan, Middle Chinese, Jurchen
- Religion: Buddhism; Khitan animism
- Demonyms: Khitan, Liao
- Government: Absolute monarchy
- Emperor
  - 907–926: Taizu
  - 926–947: Taizong
  - 947–951: Shizong
  - 951–969: Muzong
  - 969–982: Jingzong
  - 982–1031: Shengzong
  - 1031–1055: Xingzong
  - 1055–1101: Daozong
  - 1101–1125: Tianzuo
- Historical era: Medieval Asia
  - Abaoji becomes khagan: 907
  - Abaoji assumes the title of Emperor: 916
  - "Great Liao" adopted as a dynastic name: 947
  - Signing of the Chanyuan Treaty with Song: 1005
  - Emergence of Jin dynasty: 1114–1115
  - Western Liao established: 1124
  - Emperor Tianzuo captured by Jin: 1125

Area
- 947 est.: 2,600,000 km^{2} (1,000,000 sq mi)
- Currency: Liao dynasty coinage, including cash coins in the southern circuit
Preceded by
| Khitan people |
| Tang dynasty |
| Kyrgyz Khaganate |
| Later Jin (Five Dynasties) |
| Kumo Xi |
| Shiwei people |
| Balhae |
| Zubu |
| Karluks |
Succeeded by
| Jin dynasty (1115–1234) |
| Northern Liao |
| Western Xia |
| Western Liao |
| Khamag Mongol |
| Qocho |
- Today part of: China; Mongolia; North Korea; Russia

The Liao dynasty (/ljaʊ/; traditional Chinese: 遼朝; simplified Chinese: 辽朝; pinyin: Liáo cháo), also known as the Khitan State (Mos diau-d kitai huldʒi gur), officially the Great Liao (Chinese: 大遼; pinyin: Dà Liáo), was a Khitan-led imperial dynasty of China and empire ruled by the Yelü clan that existed between 916 and 1125. Founded around the time of the collapse of the Tang dynasty, at its greatest extent it ruled over Manchuria, the Mongolian Plateau, the northern part of the Korean Peninsula, southern portions of Siberia, and the northern tip of the North China Plain.

The dynasty rose from the consolidation of power among the Khitans in the 8th century and their expansionist campaigns in the latter half of the 9th century. Eventually the Yila chieftain, Abaoji, became the leader of the Khitans and proclaimed a Chinese-style dynastic state in 916. The Liao dynasty launched multiple military campaigns against neighboring states and peoples including the Kumo Xi, Shiwei, Tatars, Zubu, Khongirad, Balhae, Goryeo, Later Tang, and the Song dynasty. Its conquests include the Sixteen Prefectures (including present-day Beijing and part of Hebei) by fueling a proxy war that led to the collapse of the Later Tang (923–936). In 1004, the Liao launched an expedition against the Northern Song dynasty. After heavy fighting and large casualties between the two empires, both sides worked out the Chanyuan Treaty. Through the treaty, the Liao forced the Northern Song to recognise them as peers and heralded an era of peace and stability between the two powers that lasted approximately 120 years. It was the first state to control all of Manchuria.

The Liao dynasty was destroyed by the Jurchen-led Jin dynasty in 1125 with the capture of the Emperor Tianzuo of Liao. However, the remaining Liao loyalists, led by Yelü Dashi (who would become Emperor Dezong), established the Western Liao dynasty (or Qara Khitai), which ruled over parts of Central Asia for almost a century before being conquered by the Mongol Empire. Although cultural achievements associated with the Liao dynasty are considerable, and a number of various statuary and other artifacts exist in museums and other collections, major questions remain over the exact nature and extent of the influence of the Liao culture upon subsequent developments, such as the musical and theatrical arts.

== Names ==
The Great Khitan State (Chinese: 大契丹; pinyin: Dà Qìdān) was founded in 907 by Abaoji (Emperor Taizu of Liao). In 938 or 947 Abaoji's successor, Emperor Taizong of Liao, officially renamed the dynasty as Great Liao (Chinese: 大遼; pinyin: Dà Liáo). This was probably due to the inclusion of non-Khitan peoples in the state. The name was changed back to Great Khitan in 983 during the reign of the Emperor Shengzong of Liao due to a re-assertion of Khitan identity. In 1066 Emperor Daozong of Liao reintroduced the dynastic name Great Liao, and the title remained in official use until the dynasty's collapse. Both Great Khitan and Great Liao enjoyed about 100 years of usage.

In the Khitan script, the state's name included the words Khitan and Liao, but their order was reversed depending on which took precedence. When the state was called Great Khitan in Chinese, the corresponding Khitan language name was Great Khitan Liao (Great Qidun Hura), whereas when it was known as Great Liao in Chinese, the corresponding Khitan name was Great Liao Khitan (Great Hura Qidun). The full name in the Khitan language was thus either Great Central Khitan Liao State (Great Tiaudu Qidi Xura Guren) or Great Central Liao Khitan State (Great Tiaudu Xura Qidi Guren). It is uncertain what the word Liao (Hura) actually meant in the Khitan language. There are several theories for its possible meaning including black, broad, country, the Liao River, or simply a prestigious term whose original meaning had been lost.

In 1124 the successor state established by Yelü Dashi in the Western Regions also officially adopted the dynastic name Great Liao. In historiography, however, this regime is more commonly called the Western Liao or Qara Khitai. The Qara Khitans used neither Western Liao or Qara Khitai to refer to themselves. They regarded themselves as the legitimate continuation of the Liao dynasty and continued to use the Khitan name, Great Liao Khitan (Great Liao in Chinese), as their self-designation. Western Liao is a Chinese designation and Qara Khitai is a Turko-Mongol term. Qara Khitai cannot be found in any Muslim sources before the Mongol invasions, after which Turko-Mongol speakers mistook the word for Liao (Hura) as qara (black). Muslim historians initially referred to the state as Khitai, which may have come from the Uyghur form, in which the final -n or -ń became -y. They adopted the name Qara Khitai after the Mongol invasions.

Due to the dominance of the Khitans during the Liao dynasty in Northeast China and Mongolia, and later the Qara Khitai in Central Asia where they were seen as Chinese, the term Khitai came to mean China to people near them in Central Asia, Russia, and northwestern China. The name was then introduced to medieval Europe via Islamic and Russian sources, and became Cathay. In the modern era, words related to Khitai are still used as a name for China by Turkic peoples, such as the Uyghurs in China's Xinjiang region and the Kazakhs of Kazakhstan and areas adjoining it, and by some Slavic peoples, such as the Russians and Bulgarians.

The Khitan imperial family used two different names for their surname, Yila and Yelü. Yila (Ila) was probably an older term and meant stallion, related to messenger, standard-bearer, warrior. Yelü (Yarud) was adopted at a later point, possibly in the 930s, and is related to the Khitan adjective for flourishing, prosperous.

== History ==
=== Pre-dynastic history ===
==== Origins ====
The earliest reference to a Khitan state is found in the Book of Wei, a history of the Northern Wei dynasty (386–534) that was completed in 554. Several books written after 554 mention the Khitans being active during the late third and early fourth centuries. The Book of Jin (648) mentions the Khitans in the section covering the reign of Murong Sheng (398–401). The Samguk Sagi (1145) mentions a Khitan raid taking place in 378.

It is generally believed that the Khitans emerged from the Yuwen branch of the Xianbei people. Following a defeat at the hands of another branch of the Xianbei in 345, the Yuwen split into three tribes, one of which was called the Kumo Xi. In 388 the Kumo Xi itself split, with one group remaining under the name Kumo Xi and the other group becoming the Khitans. This view is partially backed up by the Book of Wei, which describes the Khitans originating from the Xianbei. Beginning in the Song dynasty, some Chinese scholars suggested that the Khitans might have descended from the Xiongnu people. While modern historians have rejected the idea that the Khitan were solely Xiongnu in origin, there is some support for the claim that they are of mixed Xianbei and Xiongnu origin. Beginning with Rashid-al-Din Hamadani in the fourteenth century, several scholars have theorized that the Khitans were Mongolic in origin, and in the late 19th century, Western scholars made the claim that the Khitans were Tungusic in origin (modern linguistic analysis has discredited this claim).

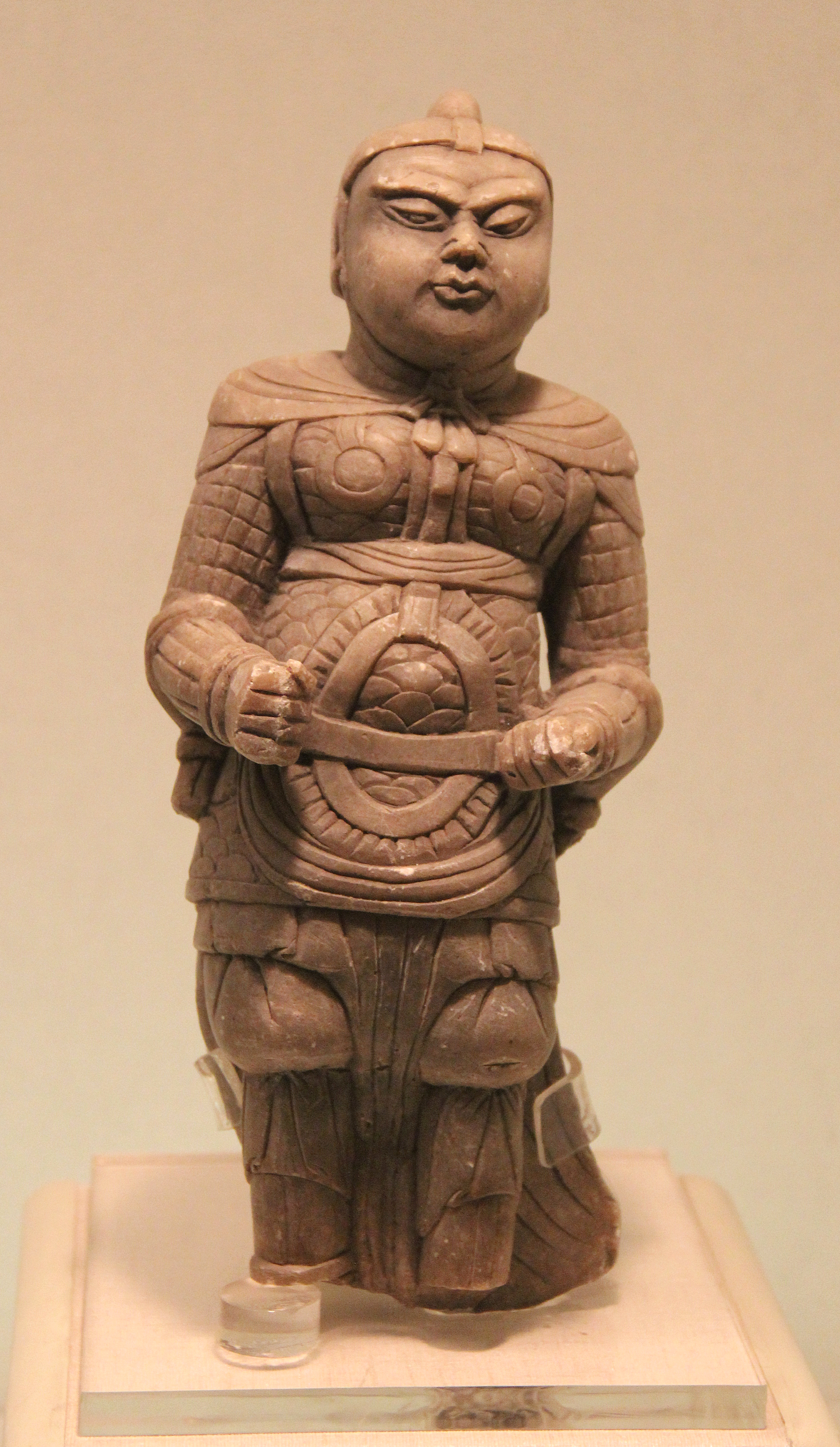
Liao figure pictured at the Liaoning Museum in Shenyang

After splitting from the Yuwen, the Khitans and Kumo Xi fled to the region of Songmo (modern southern Hexigten Banner and western Ongniud Banner). According to the New Book of Tang, the territory of the Khitans rested on what is now the area south of Xar Moron River and east of the Laoha. The Khitans then faced a joint invasion by the Rouran Khaganate and Goguryeo, which caused them to migrate south to the east of Bailang River (modern Daling River).

By the time the Book of Wei was written in 554, the Khitans had formed a state in what is now China's Jilin and Liaoning Provinces. The Khitans suffered a series of military defeats to other nomadic groups in the region, as well as to the Northern Qi (550–577) and Sui (589–618) dynasties. Khitan tribes at various times fell under the influence of the Uighurs and Sui and Tang dynasties. In the Book of Sui (Volume 84), the Khitan are described as "bellicose in plundering and raiding borders" and "the most uncourteous and arrogant among all barbarians". According to the History of Liao, the Khitans were nomads who migrated according to the season. They depended on horses for their livelihood and let them graze openly while their men were demobilized. Their men drank kumiss and practiced archery to hunt for their daily needs. Due to their way of life, they often had the upper hand in military affairs.

==== Eight tribes ====
There were eight Khitan tribes that shared power by rotating leadership triennially. The Khitan federation presented tribute to the Northern Yan (409–436), which in return invested the Khitan khan as Prince Guishan. The Khitans also regularly presented tribute to the Northern Wei (386–534) court in the form of horses and animal skins. Trade occurred on the border in Helong (modern Chaoyang) and Miyun. In 553, the Khitans suffered a defeat to the armies of Northern Qi (550–577) and lost a large portion of their population as well as cattle. For a time they resided in Goguryeo. In 584, they submitted to the Sui dynasty (581–618). In 605, they were attacked by the Türks and lost 40,000 men and women. The eight tribes of old dispersed. Only two Khitan leaders are known from this period: Hechen and Wuyu. The title of Khitan chieftains was Mofuhe or Mohefu.

==== Dahe Confederation ====
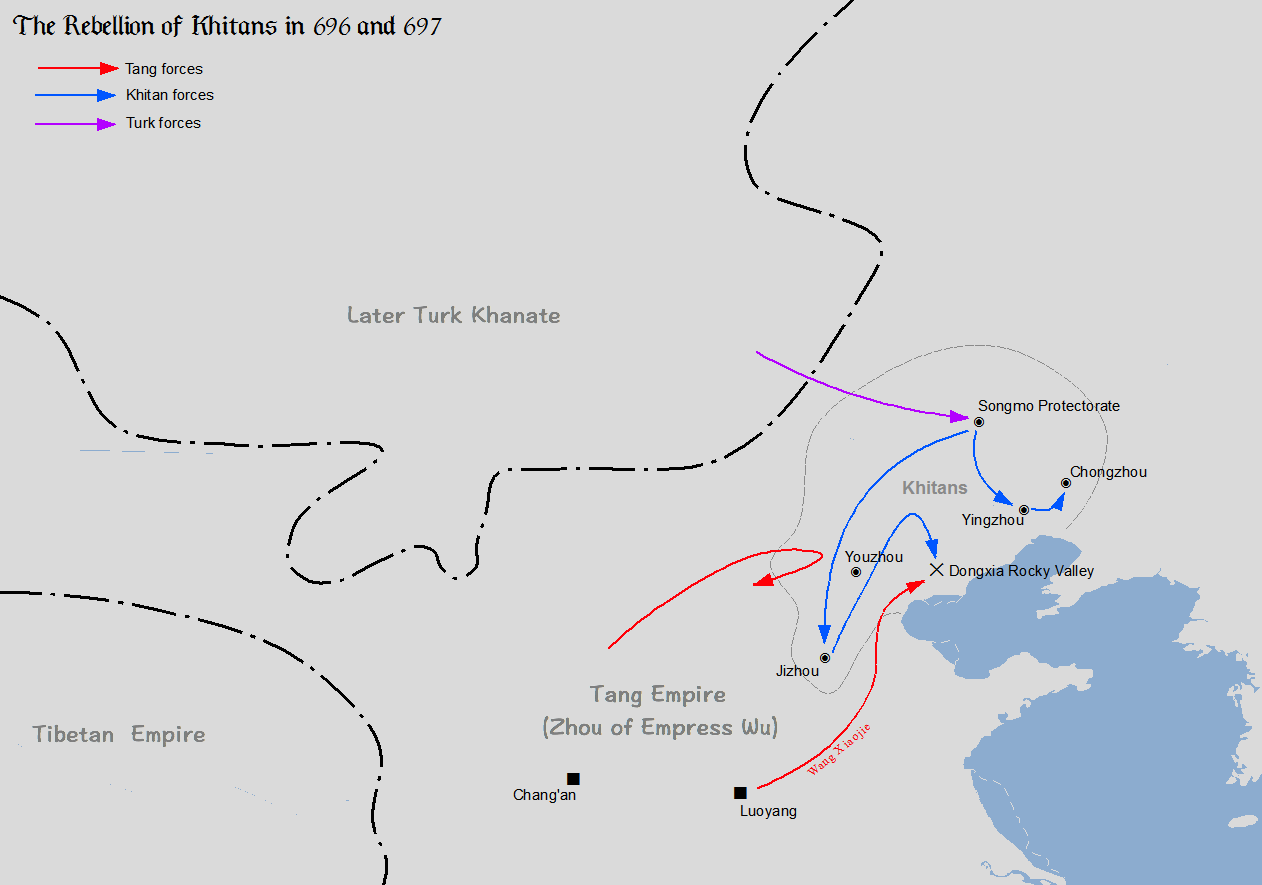
Rebellion of Li Jinzhong and Sun Wanrong against the Tang dynasty in 696–697

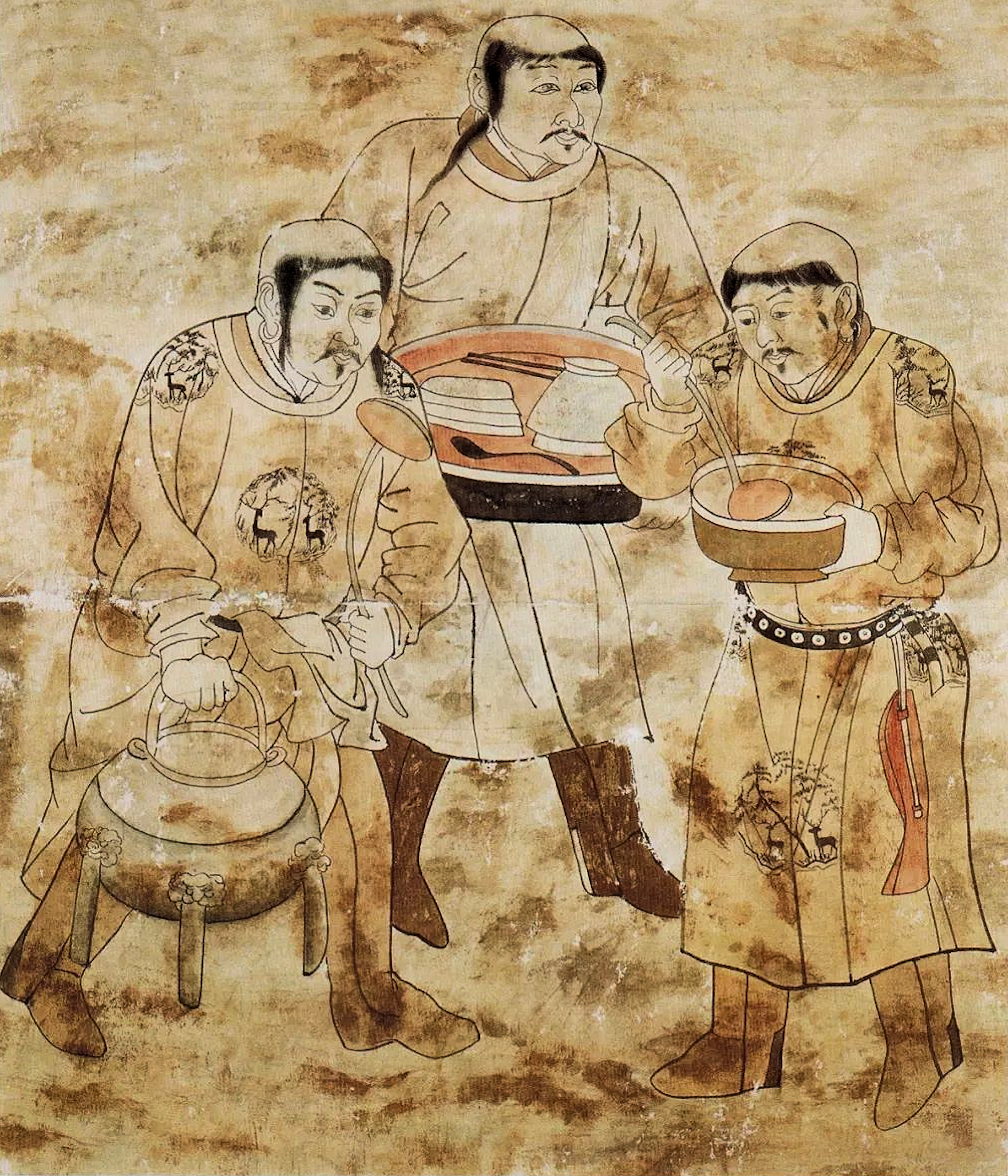
Khitans eating. Tomb mural, Chifeng city, Inner Mongolia

In the early 7th century, the Dahe clan unified the Khitan tribes into a federation. The Hedahe were the leading tribe. The component tribes were largely autonomous and the Dahe were only responsible for foreign affairs. After the Dahe united the Khitans, leadership was selected from their lineage by "Shixuan", electing a leader based on their talent and ability. The other clans had the right to vote but not to be elected.

The Dahe Confederation submitted to the Tang in both 628 and 648, under the leadership of Mohui and Kuge respectively. Kuge was appointed the Governor-general of Songmo. The chieftains of the tribes were appointed as prefects. The Tang emperor bestowed the imperial surname Li on the Dahe and appointed their leader to a governorship that was "an office specifically created for the indirect management of the Khitan tribes". Some Khitan tribes were not included in the Dahe Confederation. The Neiji tribe led by Sun Aocao submitted to the Tang in 619. Aocao's great-grandson Sun Wanrong was appointed prefect of Guicheng.

Towards the turn of the century, Tang control of the north began to slip. The Governor-general of Yingzhou, Zhao Wenhui, regarded the Khitan chieftains as his servants. The Khitan chieftain Sun Wanrong and his brother-in-law, the governor of Songmo, Li Jinzhong, felt insulted and bullied by Zhao. In 696, a famine occurred in Khitan territory and caused them to rebel. Li Jinzhong captured Yingzhou and declared himself "Wushang Khagan" (paramount khagan). The Tang were defeated at Xiashi Gorge (Lulong County) and continued to suffer defeats until Li Jinzhong died of disease. Qapaghan Qaghan of the Second Turkic Khaganate attacked the Khitans from the north while the Tang invaded from the south. The Khitans suffered a heavy defeat before Sun Wanrong rescued the situation and counterattacked, seizing Yingzhou and Youzhou. A 170,000 strong Tang army was defeated by the Khitans. Another 200,000 soldiers were sent against the Khitans but also failed to stop their advance. However the Türks sacking their capital, Xincheng, and the Kumo Xi defected from their ranks. After Sun Wanrong was killed by his servant, it took another fifteen years from 700 to 714 before the Tang were able to reassert control over the Khitans.

In 720, the military chief (Yaguan) Ketuyu attacked the reigning Khitan ruler, Suogu, who fled to Yingzhou seeking Chinese protection. General Xue Tai was ordered to punish Ketuyu but he failed and was captured along with Suogu and the Kumo Xi king Li Dapu. Ketuyu enthroned Suogu's cousin Yuyu as the new Khitan ruler and sent tribute to the Tang court, but the official in charge treated him with rudeness. Ketuyu murdered the Khitan ruler and defected to the Türks. Ketuyu suffered a defeat against the Tang in 732 and fled while his Kumo Xi allies surrendered to the Tang. In 734, Ketuyu defeated a Tang army with the support of his Türkic allies and then lost another battle against Tang forces under the command of Zhang Shougui. The Tang convinced a Khitan military official, Li Guozhe, to murder Ketuyu and the Khitan ruler Qulie, who had been enthroned by Ketuyu.

==== Yaonian Confederation ====
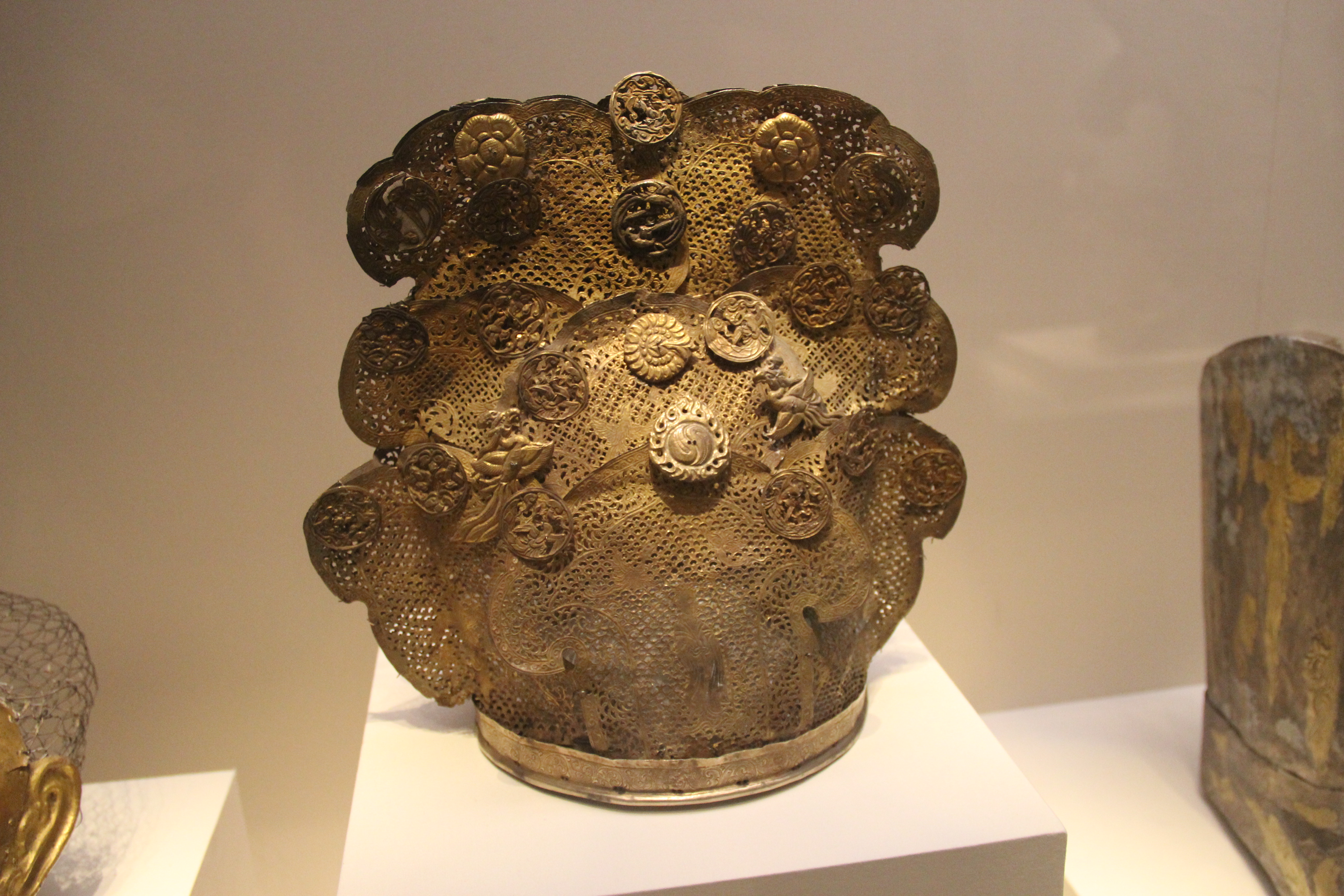
Khitan gilt silver crown (male), from the Tomb of Princess of Chen State c. 1012-1021

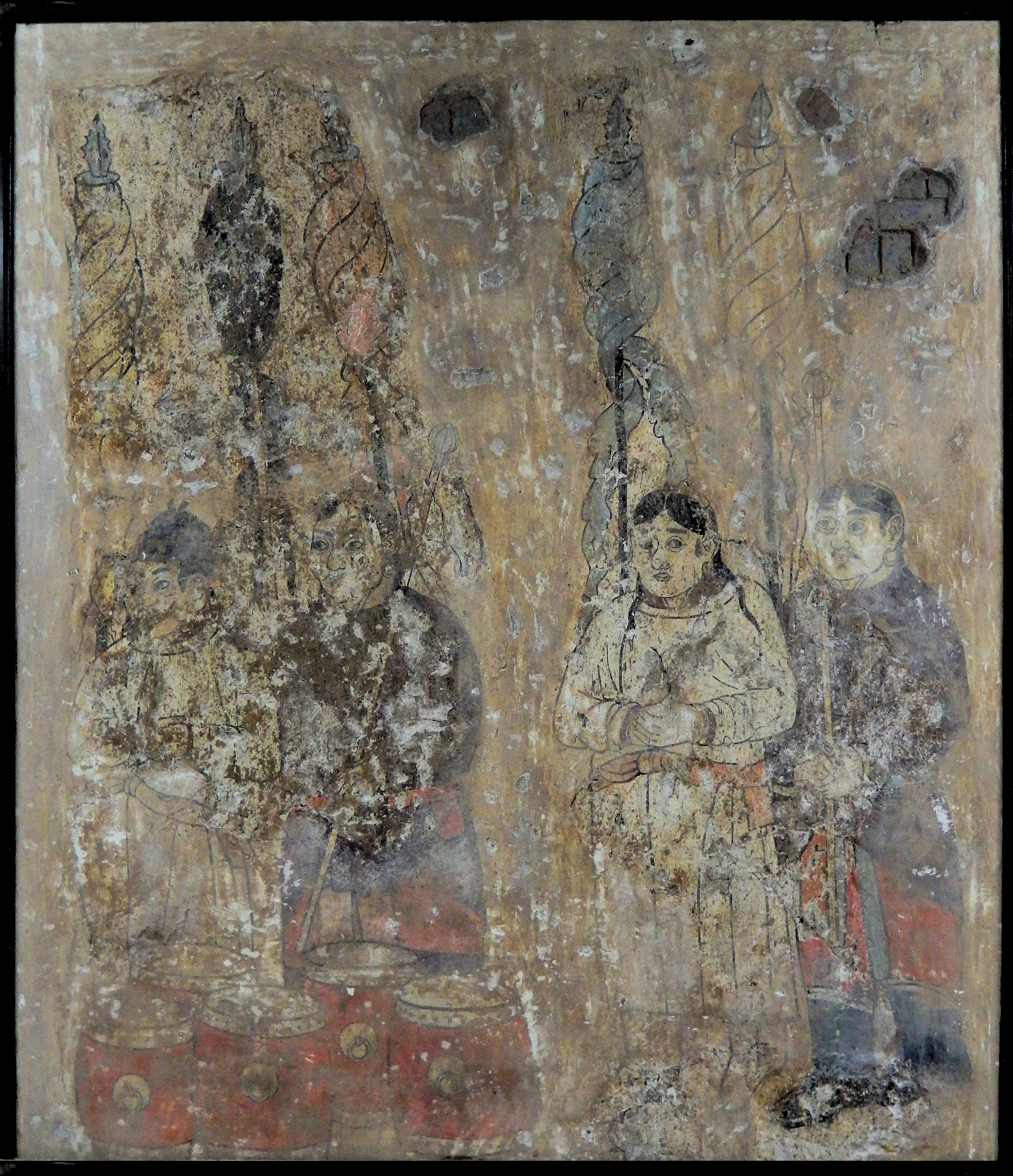
Liao tomb mural showing Khitan men with banners, drums, and maces

The rebellion of Ketuyu ended Dahe supremacy in 730. Li Guozhe, chief of the Yishihuo tribe, and Nieli, also from the Yishihuo tribe, founded a new confederation. Nieli enthroned Zuwu Khagan from the Yaonian clan as the supreme ruler of the Khitans, while Nieli became the military chief. Although there was a khagan, the military chief's power actually exceeded that of the khagan throughout the duration of the confederation. The ten tribes of the Yaonian Confederation consisted of the Danlijie, Yishihuo, Shihuo, Nawei, Pinmo, Nahuiji, Jijie, Xiwa, Yaonian, and Yila. Other tribes are also mentioned: the Yishi, Pin, Chute, Wukui, Niela, Tulübu, and Tuju.

The Tang governor An Lushan launched two invasions into Khitan territory in 751 and 755. After being soundly defeated by the Khitans during the first invasion, An Lushan was successful in the second. An then led a rebellion against the Tang that included Khitan troops in his army. An had a Khitan eunuch named Li Zhuer who worked for him as a teenager but An Lushan castrated him. Li Zhuer was highly trusted by An Lushan, and he and two other men served as his personal attendants. Li Zhuer was approached by conspirators who wanted to kill An when he became ill and started abusing his subordinates. An was hacked to death by Li Zhuer and another conspirator, Yan Zhuang, who was beaten by An before. The An Lushan Rebellion marked the beginning of the end of the Tang dynasty.

==== Rise to power ====
Following the An Lushan Rebellion, the Khitans became vassals of the Uighurs while simultaneously paying tribute to the Tang, a situation that lasted from 755 until the fall of the Uighurs in 840. There were 29 recorded tribute activities to the Tang from 756 to 841. From 840 until the rise of Abaoji, the Khitans remained a tributary of the Tang dynasty. Towards the end of that period, the Khitans began a series of major conquests. Under the reign of Xianzhi Khagan (860?–882?), the Khitans subjugated the Kumo Xi and Shiwei. Two campaigns were launched against the Kumo Xi. Xianzhi captured 700 Xi households who were later settled as the Dieladieda tribe under Abaoji's reign. Saladi, Abaoji's father, captured 7,000 Xi households and moved them to Qinghe in the region of Raole (west of modern Ningcheng County). During the Xiantong reign period (860–874), Xianzhi sent envoys to the Tang court twice. According to the Zizhi Tongjian, during the Xiantong period, the Khitans' territory expanded drastically and by the time of Abaoji, all the Kumo Xi, Shiwei, Tatars, western Türks, and Jurchens had been defeated.

=== Abaoji (907–926) ===
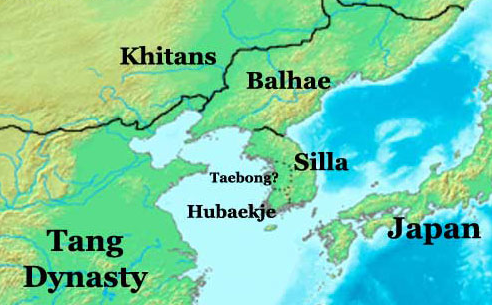
The location of Balhae in the year 900

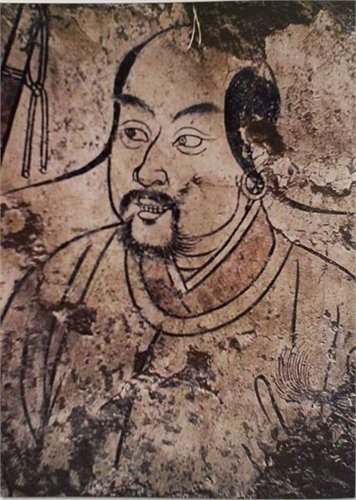
Khitan man in tomb painting in Aohan Banner, Inner Mongolia

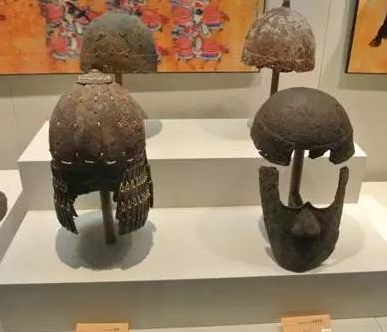
Liao or Jin dynasty (1115–1234) helmets and mask

Abaoji, posthumously Emperor Taizu of Liao, was born in 872 to the Yila chieftain, Saladi. According to the Later Tang envoy Yao Kun, who met the Khitan ruler in person, Abaoji was extremely tall (9 chi; over two meters).

By the time of Abaoji, the Yila had become the largest and strongest of the Khitan tribes, even though the Yaonian khans still held overall power. The Yila tribe descended from the Yishihuo, who settled closer to Han civilization than other Khitans. In the 730s, the Yila became a tribe independent of the Yaonian. Under the influence of Han culture, Yundeshi (820s–860s?), Abaoji's grandfather, became the first Khitan to practice and teach settled agriculture. Shulan, Abaoji's uncle, was the first Khitan to practice masonry and build walled cities. To their south, the Han people of Youzhou Jiedushi fled the rule of Liu Rengong, most of them ending up in Yila territory. Han farmers were resettled by Abaoji and Han craftsman taught the Khitans how to spin and weave. The adoption of agrarian culture, Han refugees, and more advanced labour organisation made the Yila tribe far richer than other Khitans. Abaoji placed Han intellectuals such as Kang Moji, Han Yanhui, and Han Zhigu into his administration. Kang Moji was responsible for legal matters between Khitans and Han. Later he supervised the building of the capital city. Han Yanhui was made an official in charge of military affairs and oversaw the subdued Han population, settling them and making sure they did not flee. Han Zhigu participated in strategy and decision making. He later took charge of the department handling Han affairs and managed protocols of foreign affairs. He also combined Han institutions and Khitan customs to make them easier to understand for Khitans.

Abaoji held the title of Dama Yueshali, the commander of the khagan's personal guard, in the late 9th century. In 901, Abaoji was elected Yilijin (chieftain) of the Yila by the triennial council. None of the Khitans except the Yaonian used surnames at the time, but later in the 930s, Abaoji's clan adopted Yelü as their surname. At the same time their consort clan also began using the surname Xiao.

After his accession as leader of the Yila, Abaoji raided the Tang dynasty, attacked the Jurchens, and established superiority over the Shiwei and Kumo Xi. In 903, Abaoji was named Yüyue, the supreme commander of all Khitans, second only to the Yaonian Khagan. Two years later, he led 70,000 cavalry to Datong to form a blood oath with the Shatuo warlord Li Keyong. Abaoji and Li Keyong had a conversation about the Khitan way of succession. Abaoji was concerned that he would be replaced in three years and Keyong noted that there was also a practice of replacement for his post. He told Abaoji that he could just refuse to be replaced.

In 907, Abaoji demanded that he be made Khagan, and ascended as supreme leader of the Khitans with support from seven other tribes. Abaoji then slaughtered the other Khitan chieftains, alarming the Khitan elite, many of whom saw his action as a move towards Han-style emperorship. Abaoji's rule went unchallenged until 910, when he disregarded Khitan calls for another member of the family to assume the position of Khagan. In 912 and 913, members of Abaoji's family attempted armed insurrections. After the first insurrection was discovered and defeated, Abaoji pardoned the conspirators. After the second, only his brothers were pardoned, with the other conspirators suffering violent deaths. The brothers plotted rebellions in 917 and 918, both of which were easily crushed.

In 916, Abaoji assumed the title of Celestial Emperor, proclaimed a Chinese era name, and built a Confucian temple. Abaoji abandoned the title khagan and replaced it with the Chinese huangdi even in the Khitan language. He named his eldest son, Yelü Bei, from his primary consort, Shulü Ping, as heir apparent and demanded the entire nobility to swear fealty to him. Two years later, the Liao court was moved to the "Supreme Capital" (Shangjing), a newly built walled city with a grand park and imperial tents where the Chinese palaces would normally be located. Abaoji fostered the construction of 30 more walled cities for his captured ethnic Han subjects to inhabit. The Supreme Capital was joined by the "Eastern Capital" (Dongjing). Administration of the empire was divided between a Northern Administration overseeing steppe and tribal affairs and a Southern Establishment overseeing the settled and Han population. The two institutions were headed by chancellors, the northern one appointed by the Xiao consort clan, and the southern one appointed by the ruling Yelü clan.

In 917, Abaoji received naphtha as a gift from the state of Wuyue.

In 920, Abaoji ordered the development of a Khitan writing system known as the Khitan large script. While superficially similar to Chinese writing, it arbitrarily adds and reduces strokes to Chinese characters to compose words, making it completely unrecognizable to Han readers. In 925, the arrival of a Uyghur delegation led Abaoji to order his younger brother, Yelü Diela, to study the Old Uyghur language. Uyghur influence led to the development of a Khitan small script with more phonetic elements. The Khitan script was used for memorial inscriptions on wood and stone and record keeping in the Northern Administration. Almost no extensive documents written in Khitan script have survived, suggesting that few were ever produced. In the Southern Establishment, Chinese was the administrative language, which many Khitans learned, including Abaoji's sons. In a conversation with Yao Kun, an envoy from Later Tang, Abaoji said he spoke Chinese but did not speak it in the presence of other Khitans, because he feared that they would emulate the Han and grow soft.

During his reign, Abaoji attacked numerous neighboring peoples and expanded Liao territory exponentially. Against the steppe nomads, he led campaigns in 908 against the Shiwei, in 910 the Kumo Xi, in 912 the Zubu, in 915 the Khongirad, and again in 919 to subdue the Khongirad. From 922 to 923, he raided the Jin and its successor, Later Tang. A year later he attacked the Tatars. His campaigns continued right up until his death in 926 with the conquest of Balhae and the creation of the puppet Kingdom of Dongdan. Most of Balhae's population was relocated to what is now Liaoning. The destruction of Balhae resulted in three independent groups beyond Khitan control: the northwestern Balhae people in modern Heilongjiang, the Balhae people west of the Yalu River, and the state of Jeongan in the upper valley of the Mudan River that emerged after the dissolution of Dongdan.

Abaoji died of typhoid fever at the age of 54 on 6 September 926.

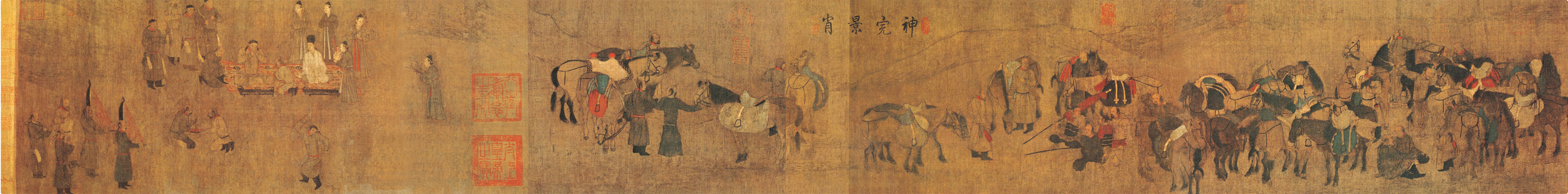
Zhuoxie tu, a 10th-century painting of a rest stop for a Khitan khan

=== Taizong (926–947) ===
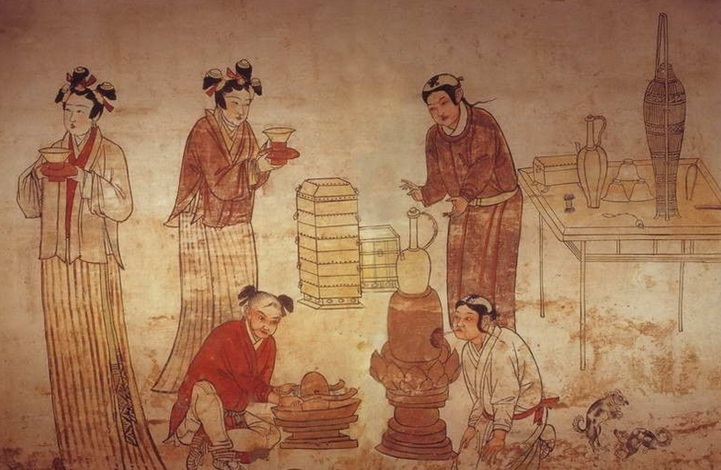
Khitan boys and girls

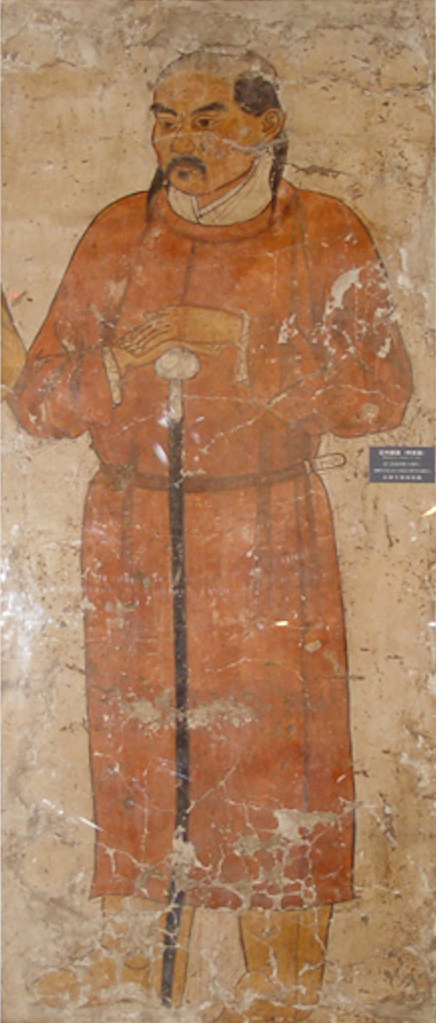
Khitan holding a mace

Yelü Deguang, posthumously Emperor Taizong of Liao, was the second son of Shulü Ping (Empress Yingtian) and not the first in line for the Khitan throne. His elder brother, the 26-year old heir apparent Yelü Bei, was disliked by the conservative Khitan elites for his intellectual pursuits. As a polymath, Yelü Bei was skilled in painting, writing in both Khitan and Chinese languages, and possessed a large personal library. He also had a taste for Chinese culture, music, medicine, and prognostication. Chinese-style primogeniture was also not a custom among the Khitans, who had elected their leader since the time of the Dahe Confederation, which was why Abaoji had them swear allegiance to Yelü Bei when he announced him as heir apparent. Bei's mother, Shulü Ping, who was exceptionally powerful in her own right, commanding thousands of horsemen and leading troops on campaign, took control of all military and civil affairs as regent, after having cut off her right hand to be buried with her husband. Shulü Ping herself disproved of her first son as heir due to his Chinese leanings and used all her influence to have Bei set aside for his younger brother, Deguang, who had participated in the 922–923 and 924–925 campaigns. Toward the end of 927, Bei approached his mother and formally withdrew his claim. Deguang succeeded the throne.

Bei was still ruler of the Dongdan Kingdom in former Balhae, given to him by his father after participating in its conquest. Taizong, who still regarded him as a threat, ordered in 929 that the capital of Dongdan and all its inhabitants be moved to the Eastern Capital (Dongjing). According to Mark E. Byington, after 929 the Khitans abandoned the region east of the Songhua River and only extracted tribute from the Jurchens who dwelt there. Dongdan lost its semi-autonomous status. In 930, Bei fled by sea to the Later Tang court and was received by Li Siyuan as an honoured guest. In 937, he was killed by Shi Jingtang, who overthrew Later Tang and ruled Later Jin (Five Dynasties) as a puppet of the Khitans.

In 929, the Khongirad rebelled. In the same year, Taizong sent his younger brother, Yelü Lihu, to attack the Later Tang at Datong. In 933, Taizong led a campaign against some Tangut tribes. The most important expansion of Khitan territory during this period, however, came from political instability in the south. In 933, the Later Tang emperor died. His son, Li Conghou, lasted only five months before his adoptive brother, Li Congke, killed him. Li Congke ordered a powerful governor, Shi Jingtang, to be transferred for closer supervision by the court, leading to his rebellion. Hard pressed by Li Congke, Shi Jingtang sought aid from the Khitans. Taizong led a 50,000 strong cavalry force to his aid and defeated the Later Tang army near Taiyuan. On 28 November 936, Shi Jingtang was invested as emperor of Later Jin by the Khitans. In 938, the puppet emperor of Later Jin transferred the Sixteen Prefectures over to the Khitans, granting them access to the strategic fortifications of northern China and the Central Plains. A new "Southern Capital" (Nanjing) was constructed at modern Beijing. Shi Jingtang behaved as a vassal and even allowed Khitan envoys to cross his territory to contact Southern Tang, his geopolitical rival.

Shi Jingtang died in 942. His nephew and successor, Shi Chonggui, came under the influence of an anti-Khitan court led by the army commander Jing Yanguang. In 943, Shi Chonggui revoked the trading privileges of the Khitans in Kaifeng and confiscated their property, sending their representative back to the Khitan court. Taizong invaded in the following year but suffered a defeat in 945, having to escape the battle on a camel. However, with persistence, the Khitans wore down the Jin forces, and in 946, the Jin commander in chief, Du Chongwei, surrendered. In early 947, Taizong entered Kaifeng unopposed. The Jin emperor and his family were exiled to the Supreme Capital. The Jin army was disarmed and disbanded, their horses confiscated. With this great victory, Taizong formally adopted a dynastic name, the "Great Liao". With the conquest of Later Jin, the Liao acquired the Jade Seal of State Transmission (chuanguo yuxi). Ideologically, the Liao therefore regarded itself as the legitimate successor of the Later Jin, and the ruler of China. It hence chose the Water element, the element that follows the Metal element, the dynastic element of the Later Jin, according to the sequence of creation of the Five Elements (wuxing). It also chose the Water element's corresponding colour black as its dynastic colour.

His victory did not last. Having brought inadequate supplies, the Khitans wantonly looted the city and plundered the countryside provisions, and imposed harsh levies on the local populace, causing them to become resentful and attack them. Rather than stay and govern the conquered city, the Khitans decided to ship everything of value, from Jin officials and palace women to maps and music instruments, back to the Supreme Capital. Taizong also faced another threat from Taiyuan, where Liu Zhiyuan announced a new Later Han (Five Dynasties) dynasty. The occupation of Kaifeng lasted three months before Taizong withdrew. Shortly before reaching Liao territory, Taizong suddenly fell ill and died near modern-day Shijiazhuang at the age of 45 on 18 May 947.

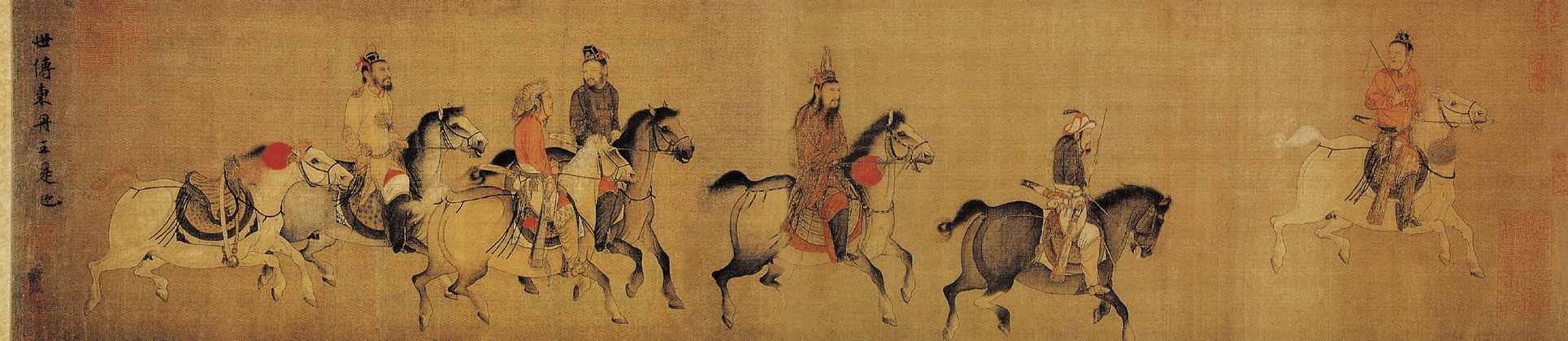
The King of Dongdan Goes Forth (東丹王出行圖), scroll, light colors on silk. 146.8 x 77.3 cm. National Palace Museum, Taipei. Attributed to Li Zanhua (李贊華 909–946), but possibly a later artist.

=== Shizong (947–951) ===
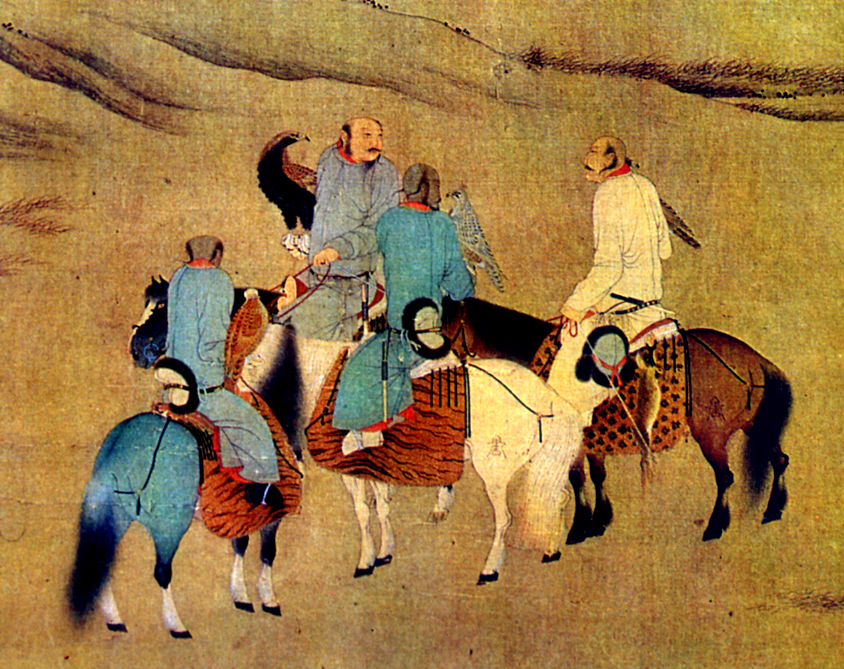
Khitans hunting with birds of prey, 9–10th centuries

Yelü Ruan, posthumously Emperor Shizong of Liao, was the son of Yelü Bei. Emperor Taizong of Liao had apparently come to an agreement with his brother Bei and chose Bei's son as his successor. Taizong had raised Ruan after Bei's departure in 930 and the relationship between them was as close as father and son. Ruan participated in the invasion of Later Jin, earning himself the reputation of a capable warrior and commander. Upon Taizong's death, Ruan declared himself emperor before "his father's coffin". However Ruan's grandmother, Shulü Ping (Empress Yingtian), opposed the succession and favored her third son, Yelü Lihu, Taizong's younger brother.

Shulü Ping proclaimed her son Lihu as emperor and sent Lihu with an army to attack Ruan while he was on his way back to the Supreme Capital but was defeated. His mother then led her own army to confront Ruan. The two armies faced each other on the Xar Moron River, south of the Supreme Capital, for several days. The deadlock was resolved by a royal cousin named Yelü Wuzhi and ultimately Lihu, who the Khitan nobility viewed as cruel and spoiled, was unable to gain enough support to further challenge Shizong. After a peace was brokered, Ruan formally assumed the role of emperor and the title of emperor. Shizong exiled both Empress Shulü Ping and Yelü Lihu from the capital, ending their political ambitions. Shizong hoped this would secure his position but he quickly became disillusioned as the internal situation of the Liao remained unstable. In 948, the second son of Taizong, Yelü Tiande, conspired to murder the emperor. The conspiracy failed and the conspirators' lives were spared. Among them, Xiao Han, a nephew of Shulü Ping, conspired against Shizong again in the following year. Despite being spared again, Xiao Han returned to his old ways a third time, resulting in his execution.

In 947, a planned invasion of Goryeo was aborted when the Khitans realized that enemy defenses were more formidable than they had thought.

From 949 to 950, Shizong invaded Later Han. In late 951, Shizong decided to invade Later Zhou. Before the army set off, Shizong and his entourage got drunk after making sacrifices to his father. Chage, the son of Abaoji's younger brother, Anduan, took advantage of the situation to kill Shizong. Chage was executed. Shizong died at the age of 33 and had not produced a son of age to inherit the throne. Shizong's rule was characterized by a series of rebellions from within his extended family. Although ruling for only four years, Shizong oversaw the formalization of the dual government system, which brought the structure of the Southern Establishment closer to the model used by the Tang dynasty.

=== Muzong (951–969) ===
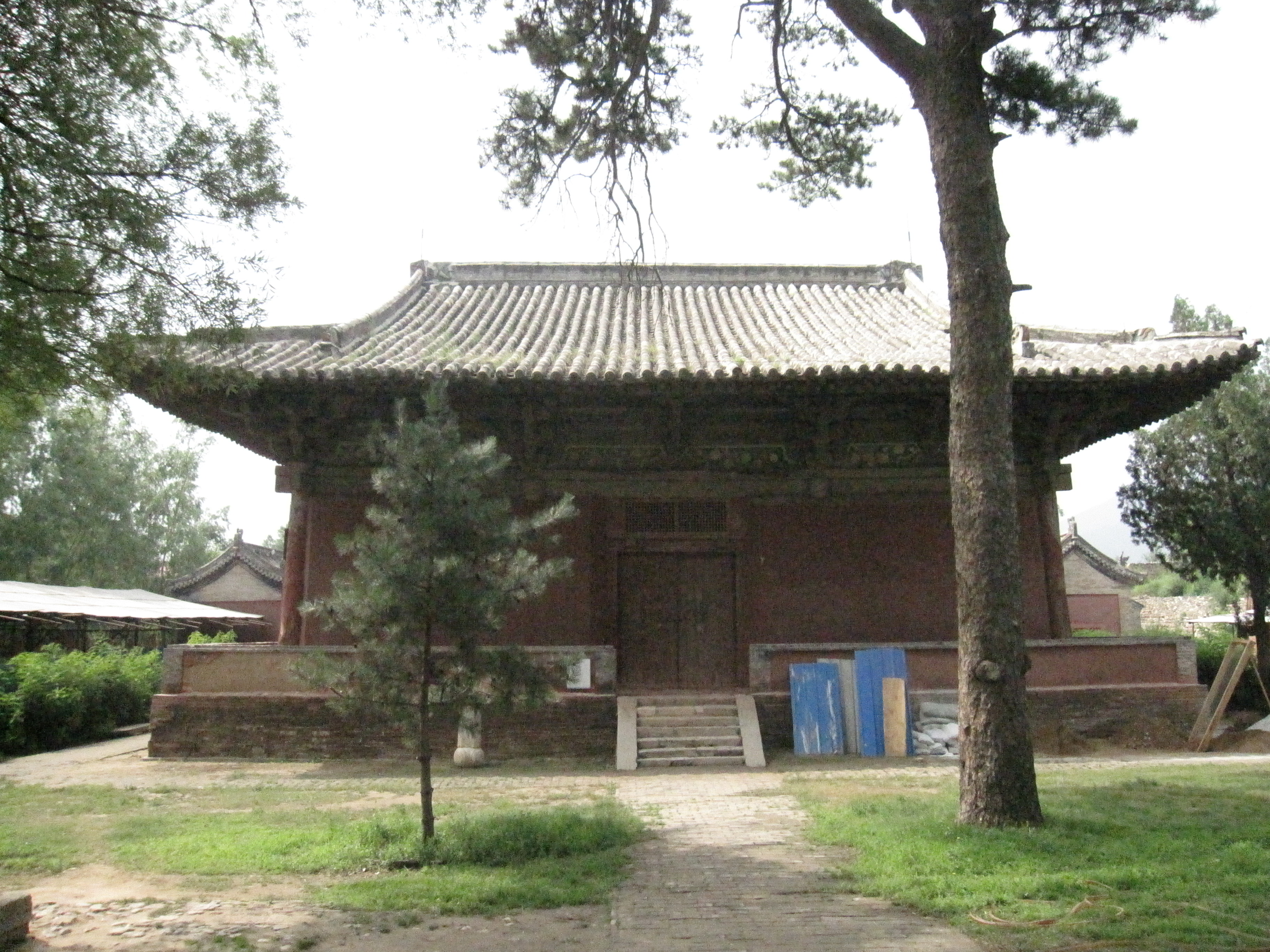
Geyuan Temple Wenshu Hall built in 966 is the oldest extant Liao building

Yelü Jing, posthumously Emperor Muzong of Liao, succeeded his cousin, Emperor Shizong of Liao. Muzong was a heavy drinker and spent most of his time either hunting or sleeping. The Chinese called him the "Sleeping Prince". The first half of his reign was marred by continued instability within his family. A younger brother of Shizong, Louguo, hatched a plot with one of his uncles to defect to Later Zhou. He was executed when the plot was discovered. In 953, a son of Yelü Lihu named Wan also conspired against the emperor. Wan was spared but his co-conspirators were executed. In 959, Dilie, one of Louguo's co-conspirators, plotted rebellion. The next year, Wan's older brother, Xiyin, was arrested for plotting rebellion. Lihu was implicated and died in prison.

During Muzong's reign, the Liao assisted Northern Han in fending off an attack by Later Zhou in 952. The Zhou attacked Han again in 954, and the Khitans once again came to their aid. The Khitans captured some Han troops by mistake and handed them back. On some occasions, Han envoys would visit the Liao to discuss strategic matters. Emperor Shizong of Later Zhou believed that the Liao dynasty were poised to invade the Zhou. In 958, the Han reported renewed attacks by the Zhou. In the following year, the Zhou invaded Liao territory, taking some border prefectures. Muzong headed south to confront the Zhou invasion but the Zhou emperor fell sick and had to return to Kaifeng. He died soon after and the Zhou invaders withdrew. In 960, the Zhou were replaced by the Song dynasty, which attacked Han in 963, and was repelled with the aid of the Khitans. Border skirmishes occurred between the Liao and Song in 963 and 967.

There were minor troubles with the Shiwei and Khongirad in 965, but otherwise the northern frontier remained calm for the Liao.

In 969, Muzong spent an entire month drinking and began to act violently and irrationally, butchering some of his bodyguards. On 12 March, six of his personal attendants murdered him. He was 37 years old. Muzong was the second and last Liao emperor to succeed Abaoji who was not a direct descendant of Yelü Bei.

=== Jingzong (969–982) ===
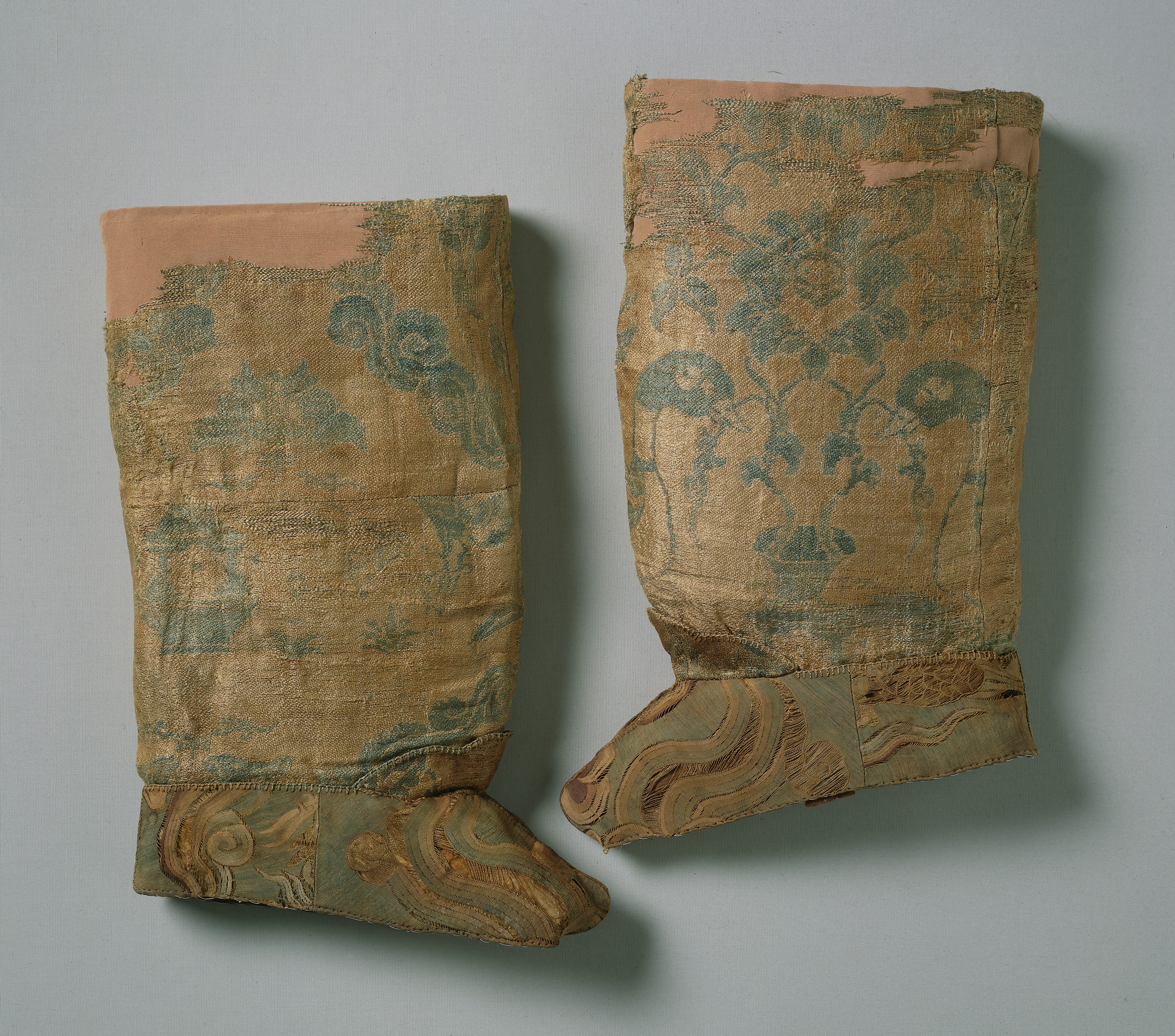
Khitan silk boots

Yelü Xian, posthumously Emperor Jingzong of Liao, was the son of Emperor Shizong of Liao. During his reign, the Five Dynasties and Ten Kingdoms period came to an end with the rise of the Song dynasty, which replaced Later Zhou in 960. The Song had defeated all the competing states except for Northern Han by 978. Realizing their precarious situation, the Han strengthened their ties to the Liao with monthly courtesy missions starting in 971. In 974, the Song began negotiations with Liao for a possible neutrality treaty. The diplomatic efforts ended in failure and the Song invaded Han in 976 and 977, both times being repelled by Liao intervention. With the conquest of Wuyue in 978, the Song concentrated all their forces on an invasion of Han. This time they intercepted Liao forces en route to Han and crushed them. In the summer of 979, Emperor Taizong of Song took Taiyuan and annexed Northern Han. Taizong then made the disastrous mistake of attempting to invade Liao. His already overextended and tired troops advanced on the Supreme Capital. Initial skirmishes ended in the Song army's favour but they lost a crucial pitched battle on the Gaoliang River. Taizong was wounded and fled south in a donkey cart. Capitalizing on the Liao victory, Jingzong launched a punitive expedition in 980, and defeated a Song army. In another campaign in 982, the Liao army was defeated and Jingzong was forced to retreat.

Aside from conflict with the Song, the Liao also experienced trouble with the Tanguts in 973. In 975, a Parhae military commander named Yan Po rebelled at Huanglongfu (formerly Buyeo province in Parhae) and killed the director Zhang Ju. The Liao sent Yelü Helibi to put down the rebellion and after two months, Yan Po was defeated. Yan Po fled to Wure where he evaded capture and his pursuers returned empty handed. The captured Huanglongfu residents, numbering over one thousand households, were relocated to the southwest where they built a new city named Tongzhou near modern Siping. In 1020 Huanglongfu was re-established in modern Nong'an with no relation to the original Huanglongfu, which possibly slipped from Khitan control. Yan Po was still active in 995 when it was reported that he and Wu Zhaodu of Wure invaded Tieli. According to a communication between the Song emperor and the king of Jeongan, O Hyŏnmyŏng (Wu Xuanming), in 981, Buyeo province had rebelled against the Khitans and become part of Jeongan. The Jurchens looted Liao territory in 973 and 976. In 981, captured Chinese soldiers attempted to enthrone a son of Xiyin but the plot failed, and Xiyin was forced to commit suicide.

In 977, an examination hall was established outside the Southern Capital.

During Jingzong's reign, much of the administrative and military affairs were handled by his empress, Xiao Yanyan (Empress Chengtian). Jingzong was often ill and unable to oversee matters of state on many occasions. All the officials and generals went to Xiao Yanyan to discuss important matters. Once a decision was made, Jingzong would be informed of the matter so that it could be promulgated in his name. It was said that even in matters of war with the Song, the real decision maker was the empress, who was the true ruler of the Khitans.

On 13 October 982, Jingzong fell sick during a hunting trip and died in his camp. He was 34 years old. Before his death, he designated his eldest son, the 11 year old Longxu, as his successor.

=== Shengzong (982–1031) ===
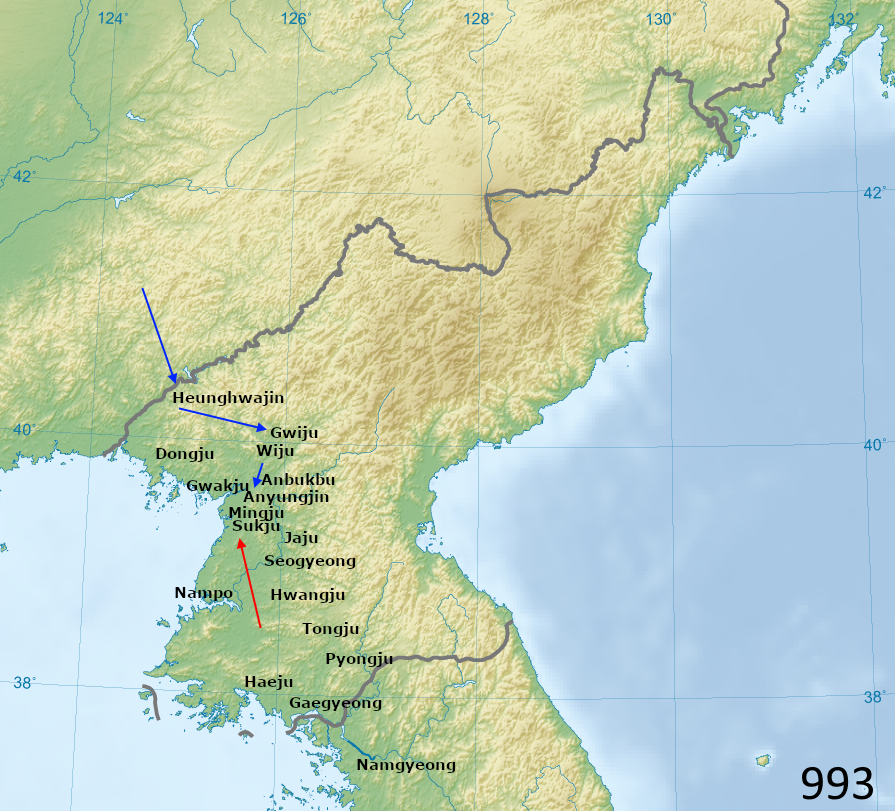
First conflict in the Goryeo–Khitan War, 993

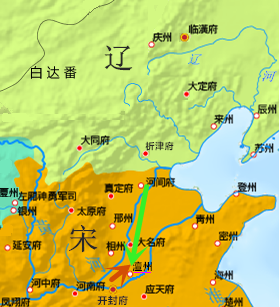
Khitan invasion of Song in 1004

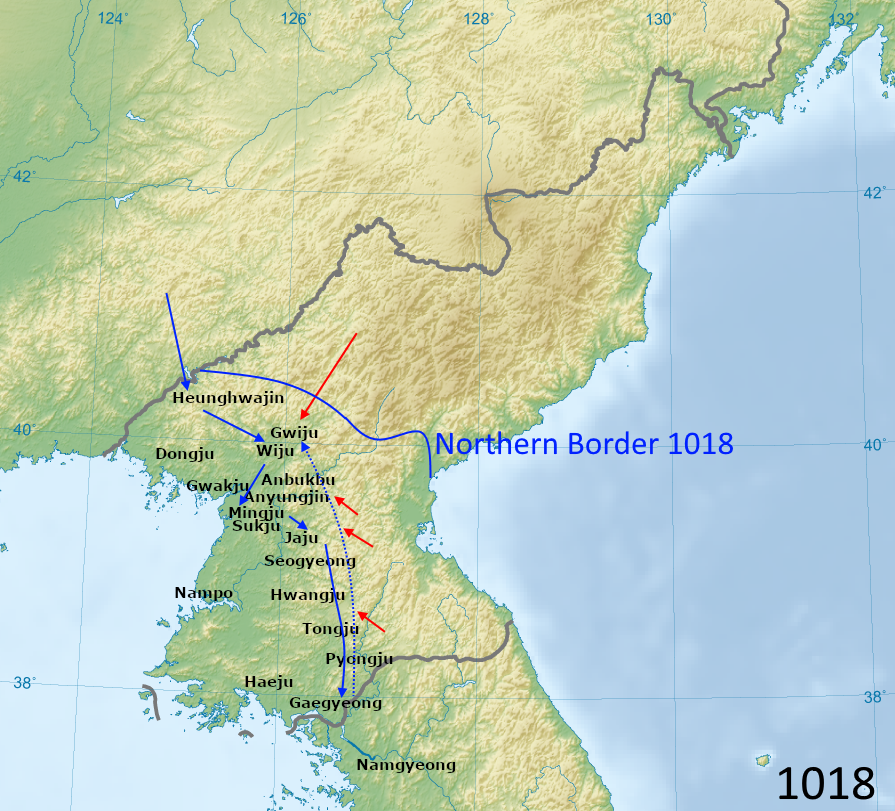
Third conflict in the Goryeo–Khitan War, 1018

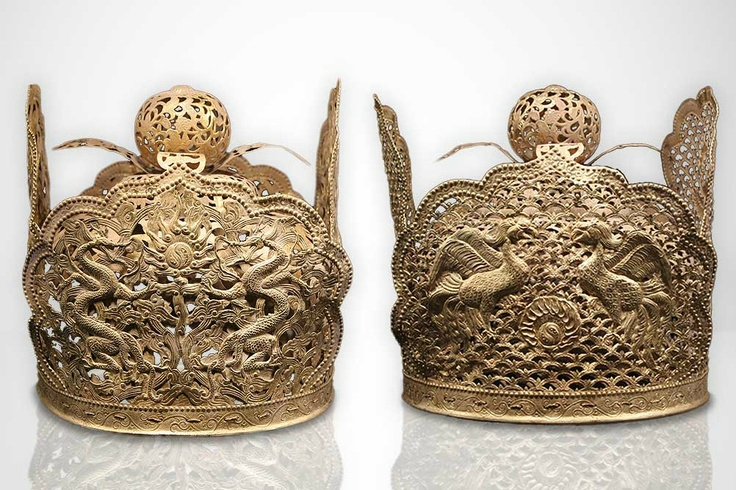
Liao phoenix and dragon crowns

Yelü Longxu, posthumously Emperor Shengzong of Liao, succeeded his father. He was 11 years old at the time of his accession so his mother Xiao Yanyan (Empress Dowager Chengtian) ruled as regent along with three ministers, two of whom were Chinese, until her death in 1009. Xiao Yanyan was an extremely capable ruler, being both astute in politics and warfare, commanding an ordo to herself capable of fielding 10,000 cavalry. According to the History of Liao, most of Shengzong's success was due to his mother's instructions. Xiao Yanyan's authority was such that even after Shengzong became an adult, she would berate and beat him in public. She may have had sexual relations with a man named Han Derang, whom she had originally been betrothed to, and produced a son with him. Han became one of her main advisers and rose to the position of commander in chief of the Northern Chancellery, which was usually reserved for the Yelü and Xiao clans.

Under Xiao Yanyan's regency and Shengzong's reign, a number of administrative advances were produced. In 983, the Tang Code was ordered to be translated into Khitan for use by the Northern Administration and in 994, it was decided that any Khitan that transgressed the Ten Abominable Crimes would suffer the same punishment as a Chinese. In 1027, a revised Chinese style legal code was ordered. The first jinshi examination was held in 988, and they continued until the end of the dynasty. However, only two or three graduates out of ten were employed. The examinations focused on lyric-meter poetry and rhapsodies and only the Chinese took them. In 991, the first veritable records were produced, with those of Jingzong's reign taking up 20 chapters. In 994, the Khitans produced their own calendar. Rules on what matters should be recorded were made in 1011. In 991, the Khitans conducted their first general census and in 997 another census was taken for the tribal population.

The Kumo Xi were completely integrated into Khitan administration by 997. The prior arrangement of vassalage and tribute had lasted since the time of Emperor Taizong of Liao, but a series of reforms between 994 and 997 discontinued that role. The Kumo Xi king became a salaried official and Chinese style administrative units were set up in Kumo Xi territory. Their former capital became the "Central Capital" (Zhongjing), which received an inner and outer wall, a Confucian temple, and public buildings were constructed between 1018 and 1020.

Militarily, the Khitans came into conflict with both the Song dynasty and the Korean kingdom of Goryeo. In 986, Emperor Taizong of Song conducted a three-pronged invasion and quickly overwhelmed the Khitan border defenses, but the tide turned as they ventured deep into enemy territory. The empress dowager and her 15 year old son, Shengzong, personally rode with their army to confront the Song invasion. Far from their supply lines, the Song armies were surrounded and defeated, resulting in resounding victories for the Khitans on all three fronts. Despite their victory, the frontier was severely damaged and many people fled their homes, devastating the region for years.

In 986, Li Jiqian of the Tanguts submitted to the Khitans and three later, was given a member of the Khitan imperial family as bride and installed as "King of Xia".

In 985–86, the Khitans attacked Jeongan and established three military colonies in the lower Yalu valley in 991, annexing Jeongan. Resistance from Jeongan ended in 999. In 992, the Khitans invaded Goryeo with a large army and made territorial demands along the Yalu River. Goryeo appealed for assistance from the Song dynasty, with whom they had a military alliance, but no assistance came. The Khitans made steady southward progress before reaching the Cheongcheon River, at which point they called for negotiations with Goryeo. While the Khitans initially demanded total surrender from Goryeo, the diplomat Sŏ Hŭi was eventually able to convince the Khitans to accept Goryeo as a tributary state instead. The Khitans negotiated a peace that forced Goryeo to adopt the Liao calendar and end tributary relations with Song (a violation of King Taejo's testamentary injunction never to make peace with the Khitan). Sŏ Hŭi's negotiations gained Goryeo the incorporation of the land between the border of Liao and Goryeo up to the Yalu River, which was at the time occupied by Jurchen tribes. By 994, regular diplomatic exchanges between the Khitans and Goryeo began.

After securing the border with Goryeo, the Khitans attacked the Song dynasty in 994 and laid siege to Zitong, but was repelled by defenders using fire arrows. The Khitans began a series of campaigns against the Song in 999. While generally successful on the battlefield, they failed to secure anything of value. In 1004, Shengzong and his mother led a lightning strike campaign right to the outskirts of the Song capital of Kaifeng by avoiding protracted sieges. Emperor Zhenzong of Song marched out and met the Khitans at Chanyuan, a small city on the Yellow River. In January 1005, the two sides signed the Chanyuan Treaty, which stipulated that the Song would give the Liao tribute each year in silk and silver, that the two emperors would address each other as equals, that they would finalize the location of their disputed border, and that the two dynasties would resume cordial relations. The amount of tribute was later increased out of Song fears that the Khitans might form a military alliance with the Western Xia but no major wars were fought between the Khitans and the Song for over a century following the signing of the treaty. Part of the border demarcated by the treaty was on the barrier-less North China Plain in Hebei. To fortify these borderlands, the Song created an extensive defensive forest along the Song-Liao border to thwart potential Khitan cavalry attacks.

In 1009, the Goryeo general Kang Cho murdered Mokjong of Goryeo and put Hyeonjong of Goryeo on the throne with the intention of serving as the boy's regent. The Khitans immediately sent an army of 400,000 men to Goryeo to punish Kang Cho; however, after an initial period of military success and the breakdown of several attempts at peace negotiations, Goryeo and the Khitans entered a decade of continuous warfare. In 1018 the Khitans suffered a major defeat and their army was annihilated at the Battle of Gwiju by the Goryeo forces under General Kang Kam-ch'an. The next year, the Khitans assembled another large army to march on Goryeo but the invasion never happened and a compromise was reached. In 1020 King Hyeonjong resumed sending tribute and in 1022 the Khitans officially recognized the legitimacy of Hyeonjong's reign. In the same year, a Liao envoy was sent to invest Hyeonjong as king. When he died in 1031, his successor Wang Hŭm was also invested by the Liao court as king. Goryeo broke off relations with the Song and the Liao ceded territory around the Yalu] to Goryeo. The relationship between Liao and Goryeo remained peaceful until the end of the Liao dynasty. However, according to historian Bielenstein, Goryeo maintained diplomatic relations with the Song, Hyeonjong kept his own reign title, and the two states concluded peace as equals in 1022.

In 1006, the Kingdom of Guiyi sent tribute to Shengzong's court, which seems to have encouraged him to attack the Ganzhou Uyghur Kingdom. Expeditions against the Ganzhou Uyghurs were conducted in 1008, 1009, and 1010. These achieved limited success resulting in the deportation of some of the captured population. In 1027, the Khitans laid siege to Ganzhou but failed to take the city, and ended in disaster when they were ambushed by Zubu tribes.

In the 1020s, the Southern Establishment tried to extend its taxation system to the Balhae people of the defunct Dongdan Kingdom, who formerly only had to pay a tribute. The Balhae people were ordered to transport grain to the Southern Capital but the journey was dangerous, leading to resentment. In 1029, a distant descendant of Balhae royalty, Da Yanlin, rebelled. He imprisoned attacked Liao officials and declared his own Xing Liao dynasty. He sought aid from Goryeo and other Balhae people serving in the military, but they refused to join him. Instead only a handful of Jurchens joined his regime. In 1030, Xing Liao and its Jurchen and Goryeo allies were defeated by a Liao pincer attack led by Punu. A year later, one of Da Yanlin's officers betrayed him to the Khitans and his short lived dynasty came to an end. The old Balhae nobility were resettled near the Supreme Capital while others fled to Goryeo.

Shengzong died on 25 June 1031 at the age of 60. At his deathbed, he entrusted his ministers Xiao Xiaomu and Xiao Xiaoxian to enthrone his eldest son, the 15 year old Yelü Zongzhen.

=== Xingzong (1031–1055) ===
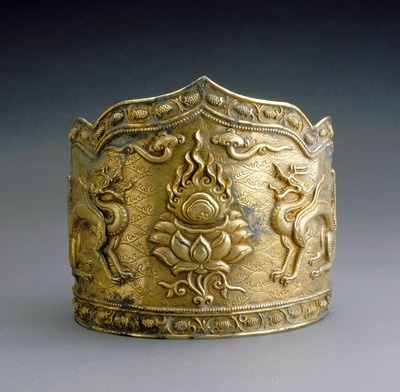
Liao dynasty dragon crown, created in the Song dynasty and gifted to the Liao as tribute

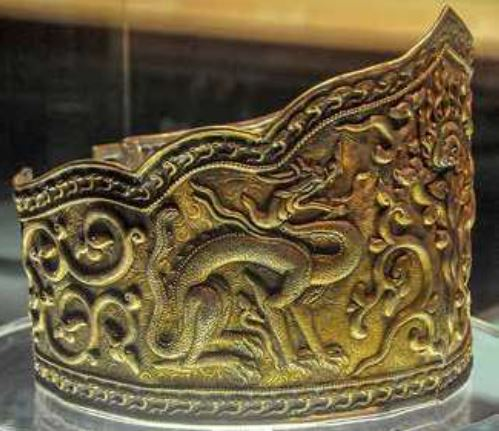
Liao dynasty crown – side

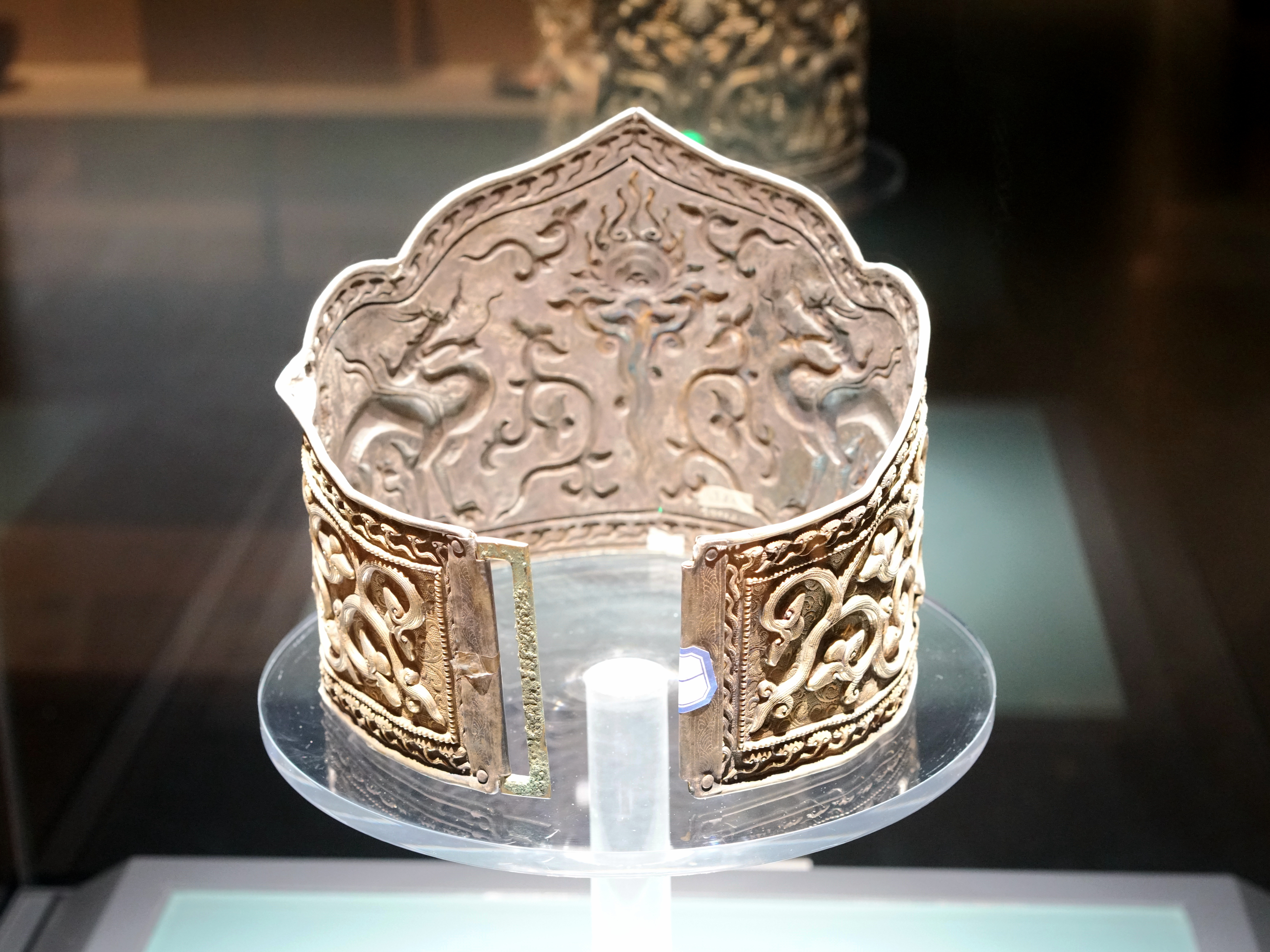
Liao dynasty crown – back

The 15 year old Yelü Zongzhen, posthumously Emperor Xingzong of Liao, was born to Emperor Shengzong of Liao and one of his lesser consorts, Xiao Noujin. Despite his parentage, he was raised as the adopted son of Empress Qitian (Xiao Pusage). Noujin fabricated a plot by Qitian to rebel and had her banished and then forced to commit suicide. Noujin declared herself the regent, made her birthday a public holiday, and began holding court and conducting duties normally within the purview of the emperor. In 1034, Noujin plotted to replace Xingzong with his younger brother, Zhongyuan, whom she had brought up herself. Zhongyuan wanted no part of this and informed Xingzong of their mother's plans, resulting in Noujin's banishment to their father's mausoleum. For his part in defeating the coup, Zhongyuan was given the title of "Imperial Younger Brother" and filled a succession of high ranking posts: commander in chief, northern commissioner of military affairs, and viceroy of the Southern Capital. Noujin's relatives remained in power at court. In 1037, Xingzong attempted to reconcile with these elements by treating Noujin with great respect and paying her visits. Xingzong appointed her brother, Xiao Xiaomu, as northern chancellor. In 1039, Noujin returned to the capital and underwent a rebirth ceremony to symbolically re-establish her position. The Song dynasty began sending separate envoys to pay respects to her.

Xingzong's reign saw the codification of law in 1036 with the promulgation of the Xinding tiaozhi which contained 547 articles and compiled all the laws since Abaoji's reign. In 1046, all local administrators were ordered to report all legal cases to the Supreme Capital. The laws were further revised in 1051. The universal application of the law was opposed by the pro-Khitan faction of Zhongyuan. In 1043, Chinese living in the Southern Establishments were forbidden from owning bows and arrows. In 1044, at the suggestion of Zhongyuan, Khitan police inspectors were established in each of the capitals to protect Khitan interests. In 1046, Khitans were forbidden to sell slaves to Chinese. On the other hand, restrictions on the Balhae people relaxed and they were allowed to play polo, a game regarded as a military exercise.

Militarily, the Liao seemed to be in decline during Xingzong's reign. The number of wars conducted in previous decades had put a great burden on the people. In the late 1030s, Xingzong asked his ministers for advice on dealing with growing distress, impoverishment, internal discontent, and banditry due to excessive demands for corvée and military service. The Confucian scholar, Xiao Hanjianu, advocated for withdrawing overextended garrisons from far off frontiers and the cessation of expansionist policies that incorporated useless territory. Instead, these forces should be concentrated in key areas to the south and east. In 1039, a census was conducted to provide a basis for levying manpower. The army was short on horses so the sacrifice of horses and oxen in ceremonies was banned in 1043. The army and its dependencies were organised into registries in 1046 and these registries were further revised in 1051. There was also concern about the quality of the troops' training, especially the Chinese troops that specialized in artillery and crossbows, skills that augmented the Khitans' cavalry forces.

In 1042, the Khitans took advantage of the Li Yuanhao's invasion of Song to ask for territorial concessions from the Song. Negotiations resulted in the Liao dropping their territorial claims and an increase in annual tribute from the Song to 200,000 tales of silver and 300,000 bolts of silk. When Li Yuanhao asked the Khitans in 1043 to join him in attacking the Song, Xingzong refused. In 1044, some Tanguts living in Liao territory rebelled and sought refuge in Western Xia. The Khitans blamed Yuanhao for instigating the rebellion and immediately sent an invasion force led by Zhongyuan and the northern commissioner for military affairs Xiao Hui. Liao forces enjoyed an initial victory but failed to take the Xia capital and were brutally mauled by Yuanhao's defenders. According to Song spies, there was a succession of carts bearing Liao dead across the desert. In 1048, the Xia emperor died and the throne passed to an infant. The Khitans saw their opportunity for vengeance and invaded in a three pronged attack. The army under Xingzong's personal command encountered little resistance but had to withdraw owing to the lack of water and pasture for its horses. Xiao Hui's army advanced on the Yellow River with a flotilla of warships but was ambushed and defeated. The third army raided a Tangut palace in the Helan Mountains, capturing Yuanhao's young widow and some high-ranking officials. The Khitans invaded again the next year and plundered the Xia countryside and accepted the surrender of a Tangut general. The Western Xia agreed to become a tributary and peaceful relations were restored by 1053.

In 1044, Datong formally became the "Western Capital" (Xijing), completing the five capital regions.

Xingzong fell sick and died on 28 August 1055. He was 39 years old.

=== Daozong (1055–1101) ===
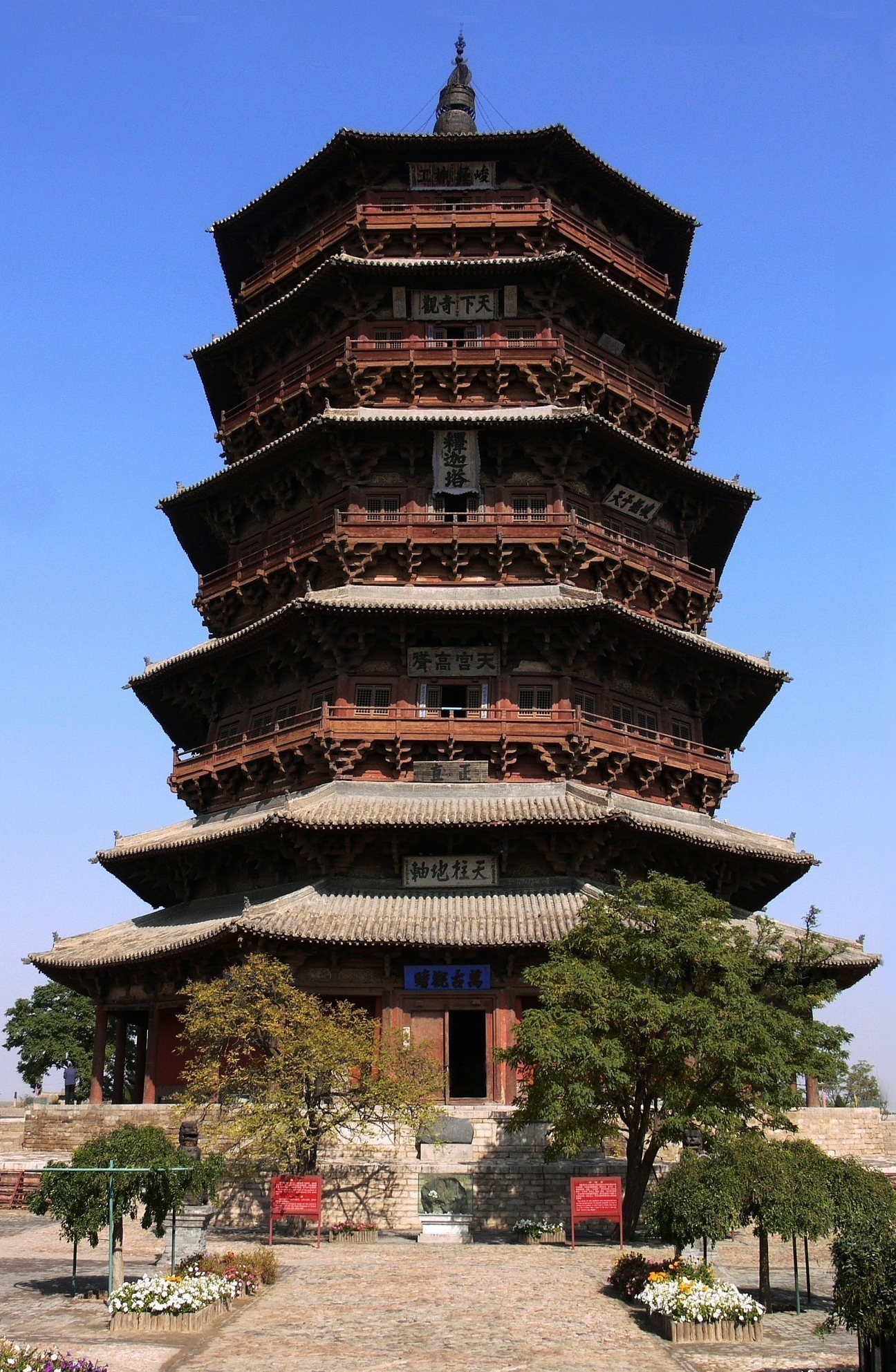
The Pagoda of Fogong Temple, built by Emperor Daozong of Liao in 1056 at the site of his grandmother's family home.

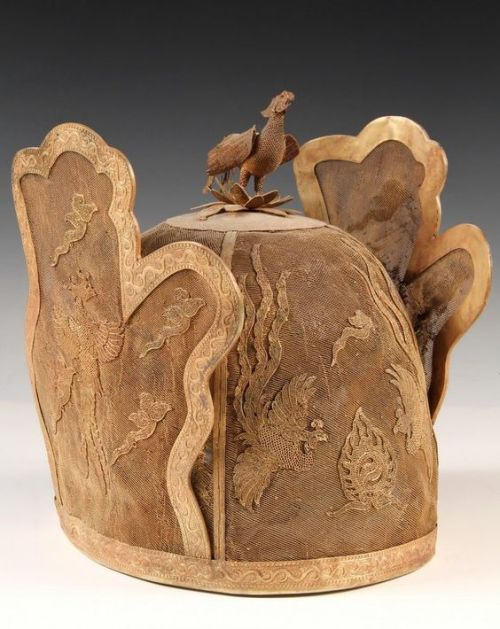
Liao dynasty gold wire phoenix crown

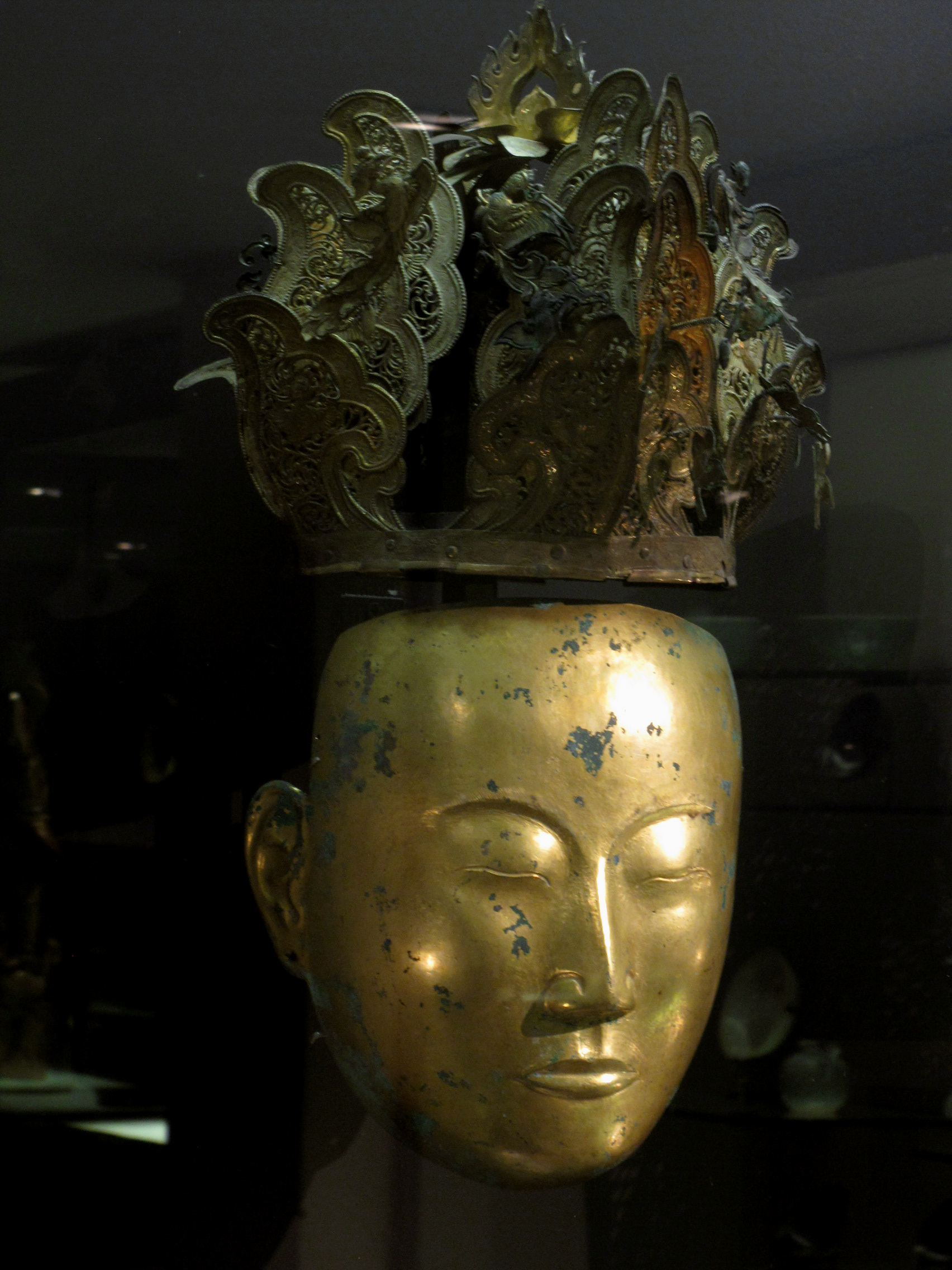
Funerary mask and crown from the Liao dynasty

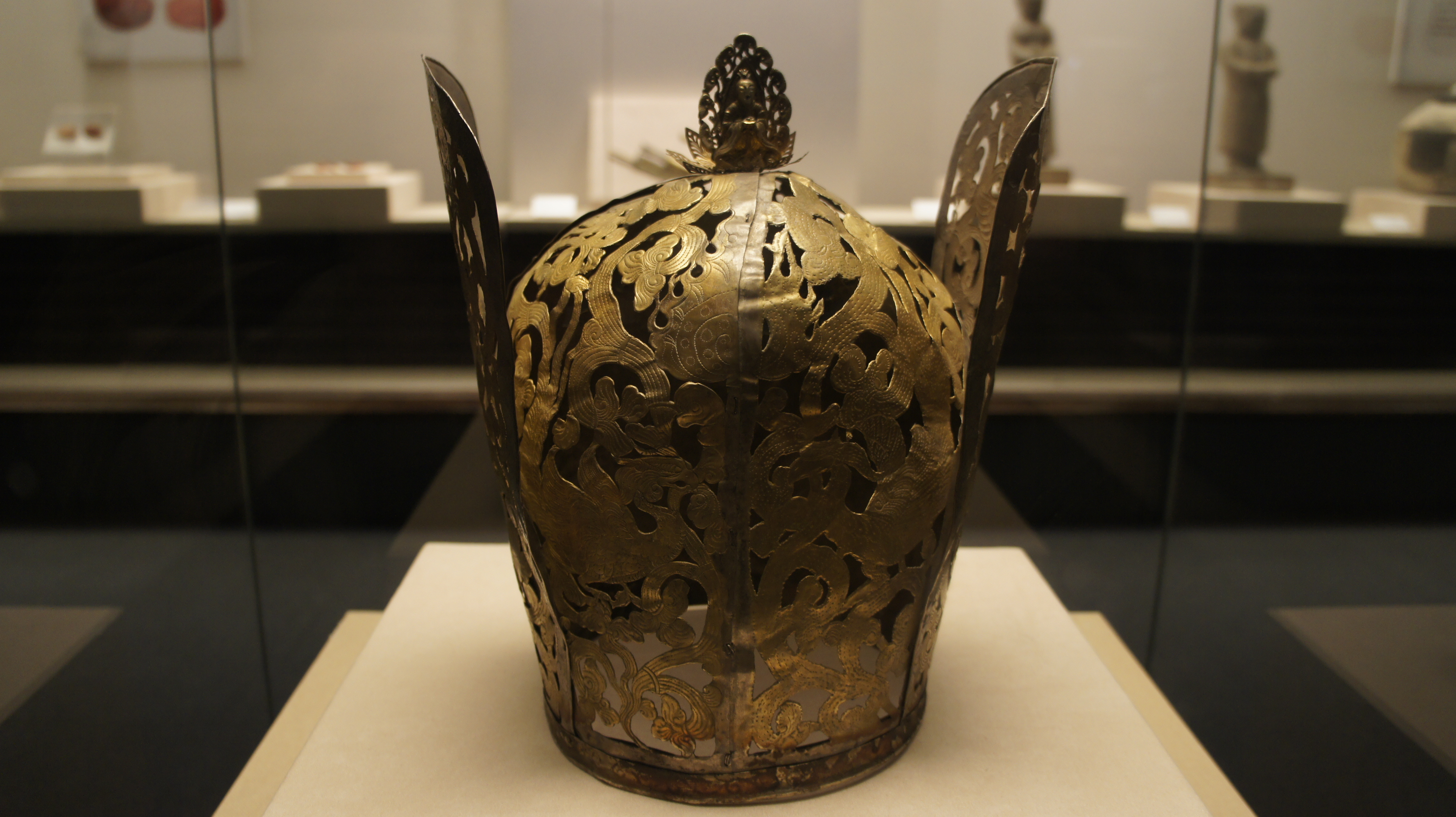
Gilt silver crown, excavated in 1986 from the tomb of Princess of Chen and her husband in Tongliao, Inner Mongolia.

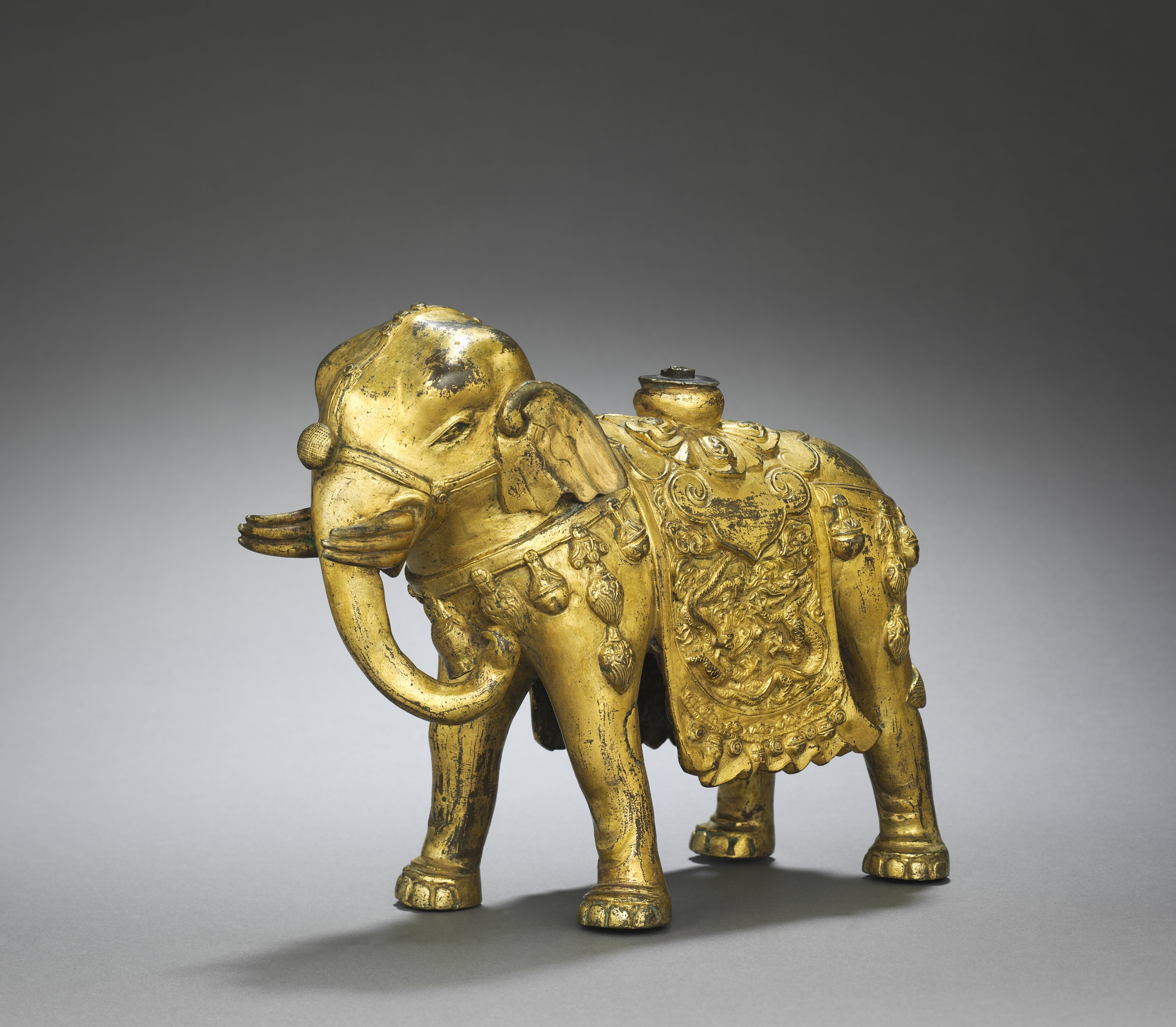
Gilt bronze statue of the six-tusked elephant holding the throne of Puxian (Samantabhadra), the Bodhisattva of Universal Virtue, c. 1000 Liao dynasty

Yelü Hongji, posthumously Emperor Daozong of Liao, succeeded his father, Emperor Xingzong of Liao, having already gained experience in governing while his father was alive. While both Xiao Noujin and Zhongyuan still held substantial power, neither disputed the succession.

In 1055 all officials, and not just the emperor and members of the Southern Establishment, were required to wear Chinese court dress at major ceremonies. Daozong himself was highly taken with Chinese learning, poetry, Confucianism, and Buddhism. He placed greater emphasis on Chinese education and the imperial examinations for selection of officials. The number of jinshi passed in each examination increased from 50 to 60 during Xingzong's reign to over 100 under Daozong. In 1059 schools were established all over the empire. In 1060, a second Guozijian was set up in the Central Capital in addition to the one in the Supreme Capital. In 1070 a special palace examination called the "Examination for the worthy and good" (Xianliang ge) was established, requiring entrants to submit 100,000 characters worth of writing. In 1072 Daozong personally wrote the questions for the palace examination.

Daozong's court was initially dominated by two men, Xiao Ge and Xiao Ala. They had a falling out and Ge denounced Ala for voicing harsh criticisms at the government, resulting in Ala's execution by strangulation, leaving the court under the control of Xiao Ge (who retired the following year), Yelü Renxian, and Yelü Yixin. Renxian and Yixin came into conflict with Zhongyuan, who wanted to remove Renxian from the southern Chancellery. In 1059, the tribal judges were subordinated to the local prefect or magistrate, increasing imperial oversight over local Khitan affairs. In 1063, pro-Khitan elements led by Zhongyuan rebelled and ambushed Daozong while he was out on a hunting trip. Daozong was wounded by crossbows and fell from his horse but he was saved by his servants while his mother, the Empress Dowager Renyi (Xiao Tali), led the guards to ward off the attackers. The rebel leaders were either killed or committed suicide, including Zhongyuan. All the conspirators and their families were executed, resulting in extensive changes in Liao leadership.

After the rebellion, Yelü Yixin and his ally Yelü Renxian jointly controlled the Northern Commission for Military Affairs for a while. In 1065, Renxian became commander in chief. For the next 15 years, Yixin exercised unrivaled influence in court and acted opportunistically to advance self-interest, selecting corrupt and worthless men for office, taking bribes, and allowing the military to do anything they wanted. Renxian tried to contain him but eventually left for the post of viceroy of the Southern Capital. Daozong remained aloof from politics, providing no real leadership, and instead opted to pursue his own scholarly interests. In 1064 he ordered a search for books lacking in the imperial collection. In 1074 the government distributed copies of the Records of the Grand Historian and the Book of Han. In the same year a bureau for compiling national history was established, which produced in 1085 Veritable Records for the first seven reigns. Daozong gathered prominent scholars around him to expound on various canonical texts and greatly patronized Buddhist monks. In 1090 a Song envoy commented on how lavishly the emperor patronized the Buddhist clergy and their all-pervasive influence on society. In the latter years of Daozong's reign, he all but abandoned his administrative duties and selected officials by having the candidates roll dice. The historian who compiled the record of his reign was selected in this manner.

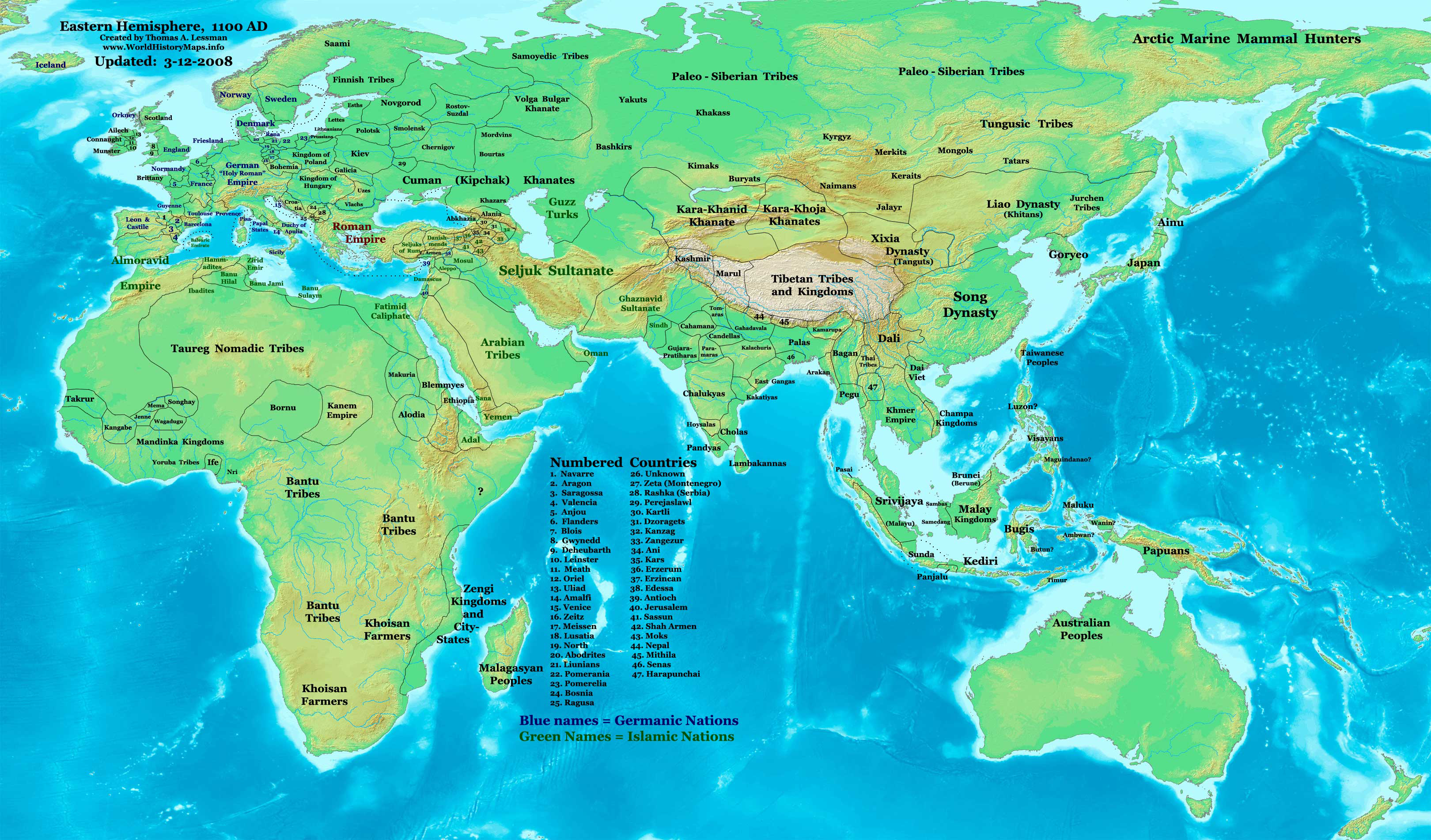
Asia in 1100, showing the Khitan Empire and its neighbors

Khitan resistance to Han influence did not disappear after the rebellion. In 1064 the private publication of books was banned, a measure with disproportionate impact on the urban Han elite. In 1067 Daozong underwent a traditional rebirth ceremony, while still engrossed in his studies, to re-establish his legitimacy as leader of the Khitans. In 1070 the Han were forbidden from hunting, which was considered a military exercise. Daozong recognized that the Khitan and Han customs were different, so he ordered Yixin and Renxian to revise the laws to take this into account. The new laws were so out of step with actual practice that they proved unenforceable. In 1089 the new laws were abandoned and the Xinding tiaozhi of 1036 was reinstated. It is clear that while Daozong had a predilection towards Han culture, he also recognized that there were limits to how far he could advance pro-Han measures while governing Khitan elites. In 1074 the scholarly official Yelü Shuzhen suggested adopting Han style surnames for all Khitan tribes, which Daozong rejected, declaring that "the old order should not be changed suddenly".

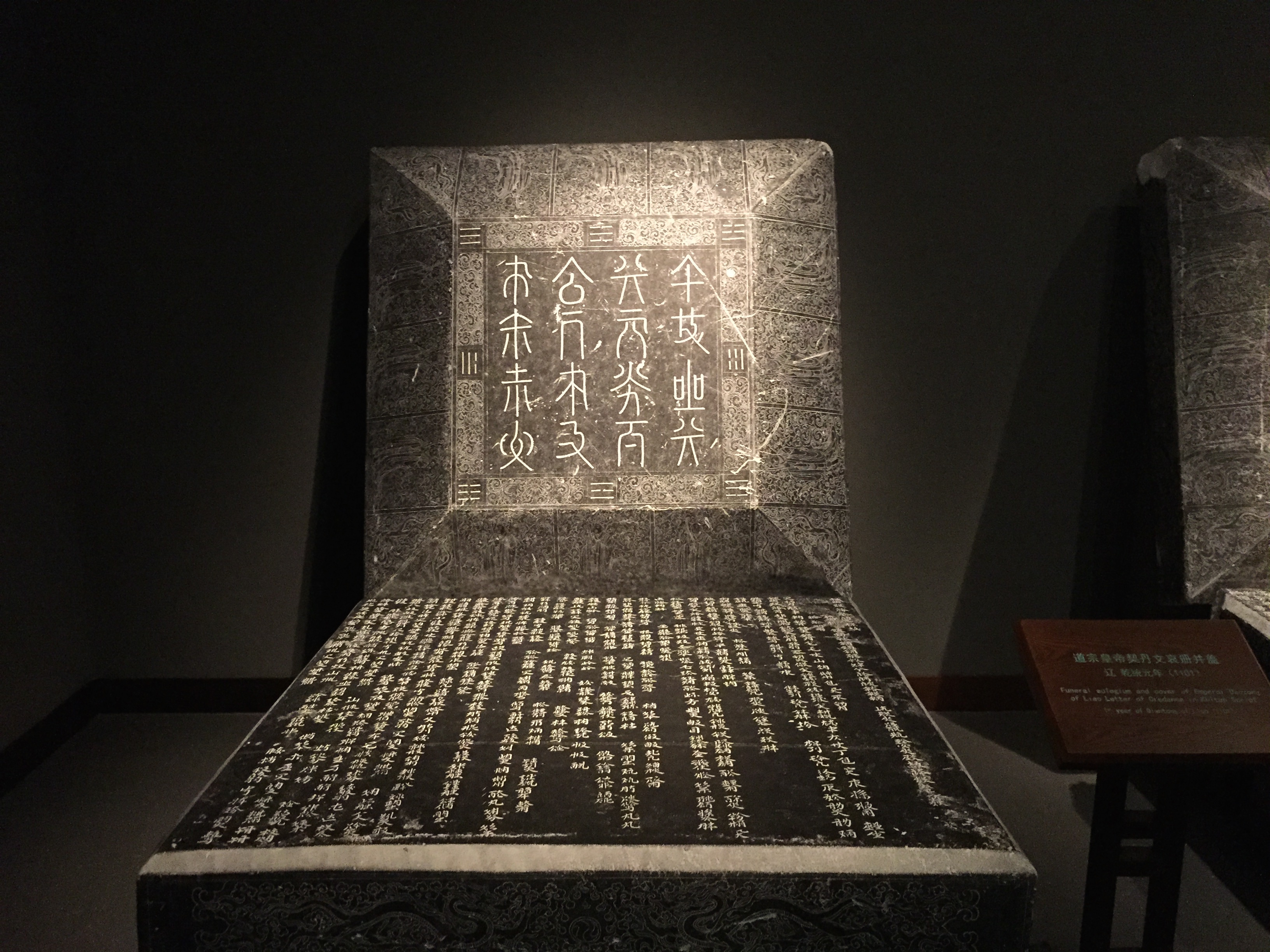
Epitaph of Xiao Guanyin, the wife of Emperor Daozong of Liao, in Khitan small script

After Yelü Renxian died, Yelü Yixin became the predominant figure in Liao court politics. He set in motion plans to eliminate the crown prince's mother, Xiao Guanyin, by accusing her of having an affair with a palace musician. Evidence of correspondence between the two through love poetry was fabricated, convincing Daozong to execute the empress and the musician's family. The former empress was replaced by one of Yixin's followers, Xiao Tansi. The crown prince, Yelü Jun, attempted to kill Yixin but failed. The next year, Jun was implicated in a coup to replace Daozong and evidence of a confession by Jun was fabricated by Yixin, resulting in his imprisonment and death at the hands of Yixin's agents. Yixin convinced the viceroy of the Supreme Capital to report the cause of death as a result of illness. The new empress was barren so Daozong decided to make Jun's son, Yelü Yanxi, his heir. In 1079, Yixin tried to persuade Daozong to leave Yanxi behind on a hunting trip, which came to the attention of several courtiers who alerted the emperor and convinced him to take Yanxi with him. This event caused Daozong to lose trust in Yixin, who was demoted, exiled, and eventually found guilty of trading prohibited goods for which he was sentenced to death. From then on, Yanxi was carefully groomed for the throne. In 1086 Daozong showed him the armour and weapons of Abaoji and Emperor Taizong of Liao, describing to him the hardships of the campaigns on which the dynasty was founded. A few weeks later Yanxi underwent a rebirth ceremony. In 1088 he was assigned to his first office. A year later he was married and sons were born in 1089 and 1093.

Economically the Liao dynasty suffered greatly from natural disasters during Daozong's reign. Starting from 1065, every year an area was struck by some natural disaster. At first it was mainly the southern agricultural regions that were affected but in the 1080s and 1090s, the tribal areas also experienced immense suffering, resulting in displaced families and vagrants. The government constantly lost revenue due to payments of relief and the granting of tax exemptions. In 1074, the Eastern Capital region was hit by severe flooding, after which orders were given to construct flood control works. This was opposed on grounds that the necessary labour levies involved would cause even greater hardship and unrest. In the winter of 1082–83, unusually heavy snowfall killed up to 60–70 per cent of tribal livestock and horses.

Militarily the reign of Daozong saw little conflict with other settled states. In 1074 there was a border demarcation crisis with the Song but it was resolved by peaceful diplomacy in 1076. In 1078 Goryeo's king asked for territory east of the Yalu River, which was rejected without any trouble or break in relations. The situation on the northwestern borderland was less stable and events toward the end of Daozong's reign would see the subjugation of the Zubu tribes, some of whom lived in Liao territory but had long resisted Khitan rule. There were outbreaks of warfare with the Zubu previously in 997–1000, 1007, 1012–23, and 1027. In 1063, 1064, and 1070, prohibitions were placed on the trade of metals to the Western Xia, Zubu tribes, and Uyghurs. In 1069, there was a renewed Zubu rebellion which was put down by Yelü Renxian. In 1086 the Zubu chieftain attended court and Daozong ordered his grandson, Yelü Yanxi, to be friendly towards him as he was a valuable ally. However, in 1089, Zubu leadership passed to Mogusi. In 1092, the Khitans attacked several tribes in the northwest neighboring the Zubu and the Zubu became involved. In 1093 Mogusi led a series of raids deep into Liao territory and drove off many of the state herds. Other tribes such as the Dilie (Tiriet), who had previously rebelled in 1073, also joined Mogusi. It took until 1100 for the northern commissioner for military affairs, Yelü Wotela, to capture and kill Mogusi. His death did not end warfare with the northwestern tribes and it took another two years to defeat the remaining Zubu forces. The war against the Zubu was the last successful military campaign waged by the Liao dynasty.

Daozong died on 12 February 1101 at the age of 68. He was succeeded by his grandson, Yelü Yanxi.

=== Tianzuo (1101–1125) ===
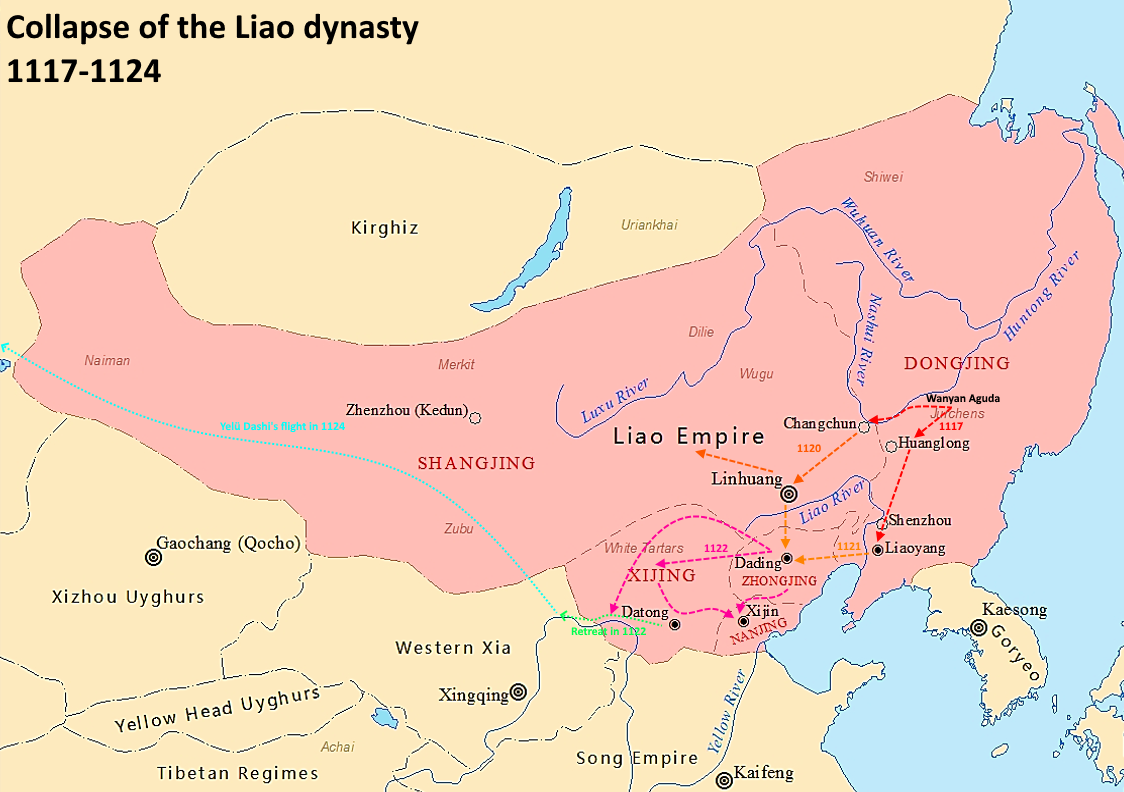
Collapse of the Liao dynasty (1117–1124)

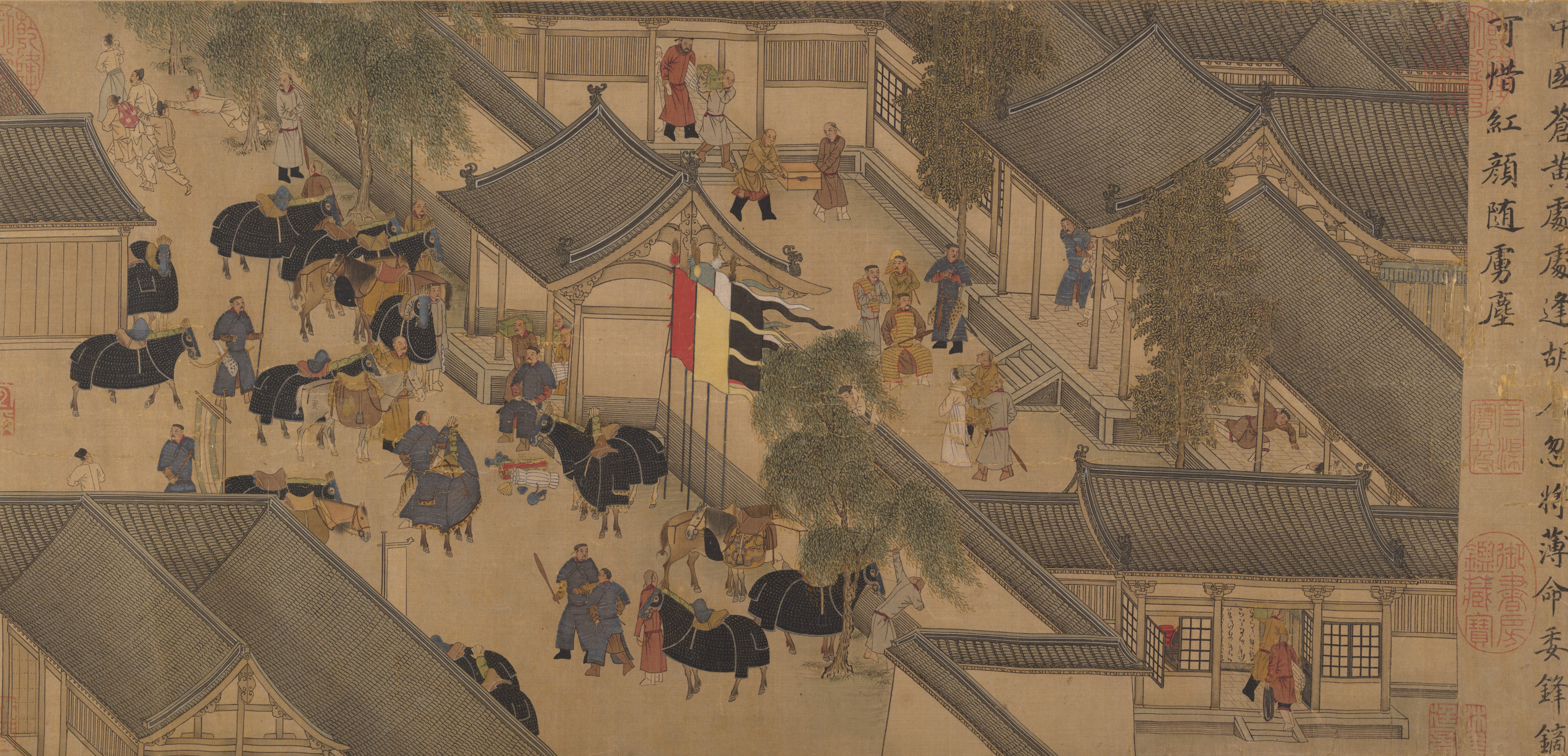
Depiction of Xiongnu cavalry in the Eighteen Songs of a Nomad Flute, commissioned by Emperor Gaozong of Song. While the subjects are the Xiongnu, the hairstyle depicted is distinctly Khitan, and likely based on northern steppe peoples contemporary to the Song.

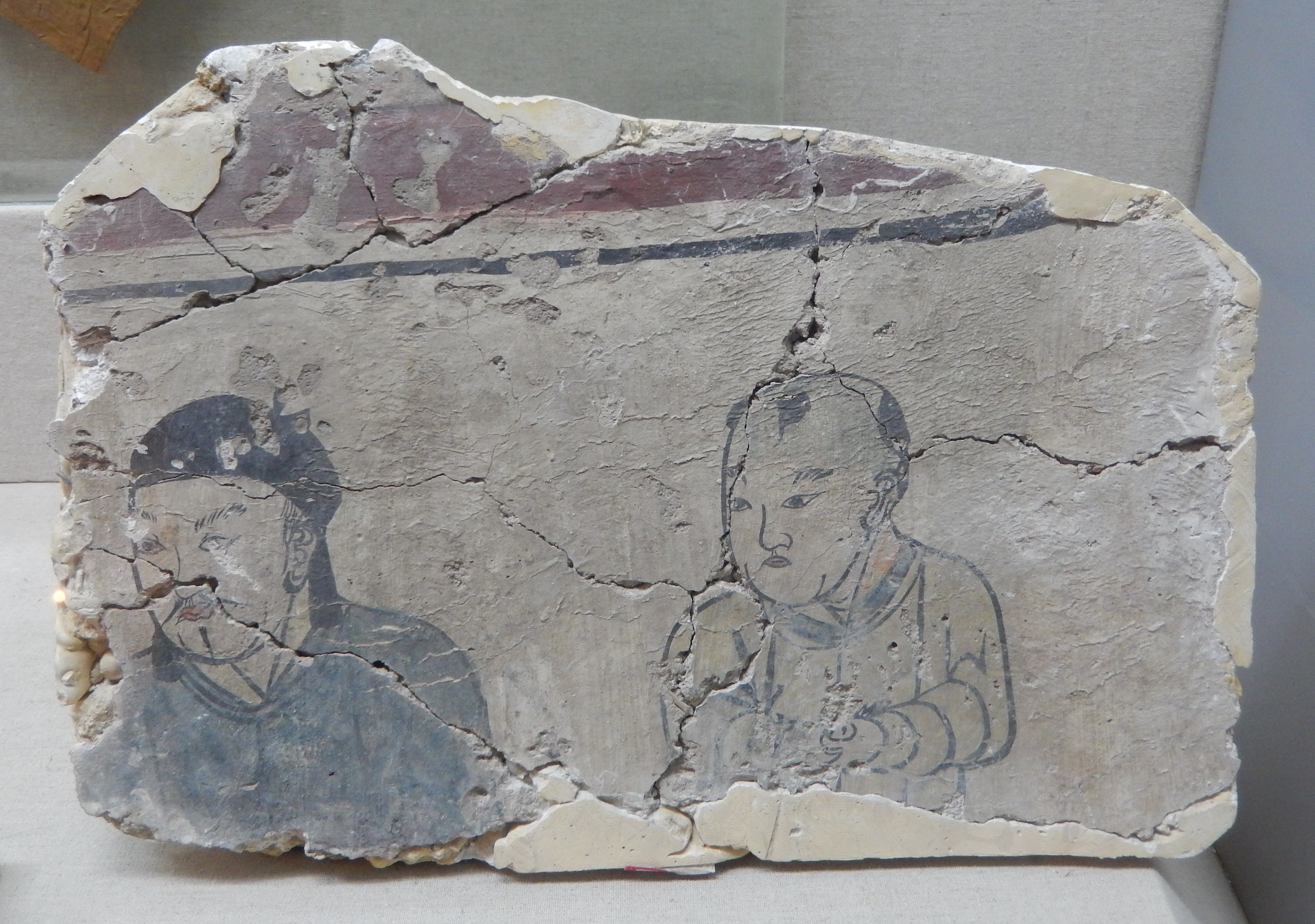
Fragment of a tomb mural showing a Khitan boy

The accession of Yelü Yanxi, posthumously Emperor Tianzuo of Liao, proceeded without incident. Upon becoming emperor, he ordered the desecration the tomb of Yelü Yixin and all those who brought about the deaths of his family. The deceased Emperor Daozong of Liao was interred together with the empress who had been forced to commit suicide. Tianzuo's father, Jun, was given a posthumous temple name as though he had reigned as emperor.

Natural disasters continued to plague the Liao dynasty intermittently. In 1105 Tianzuo went out in disguise to see the suffering of the people, but nothing else on record hints at what he may have prescribed in policy. In the same year, merchant families were barred from taking the jinshi exam, which suggests continued adherence to the Chinese mode of governance. Between 1103 and 1105, the Western Xia repeatedly requested the Khitans to attack the Song dynasty, but the Liao court refused. The Liao cemented its relations with the Tanguts with a marriage alliance and sent an envoy requesting the Song to stop its attacks on Western Xia. Diplomatic relations with the neighboring settled states remained cordial and even the Zubu sent embassies pledging their allegiance in 1106, 1110, and 1112.

Despite international peace on several fronts, the Liao dynasty fell to the Jurchens by 1125. The Jurchens were a Tungusic people who lived in fragmented tribes stretching northward from the border of Goryeo. They had been in contact with the Khitans ever since the beginning of the dynasty. Despite their marginal status, they were militarily significant to be acknowledged by the Song as potential allies. They periodically caused trouble for the Khitans. The Liao categorized the Jurchens into three groups: "civilized" Jurchens (shu nüzhi) descended from tribes captured early on by the Liao and assimilated into Khitan society, "obedient" Jurchens (shun nüzhi) subordinate to the Liao and had regular contact with the court, and "wild" Jurchens (sheng nüzhi) who inhabited the lower Songhua River valley and the eastern mountains of modern Heilongjiang. During the 11th century, one of the wild Jurchen clans called the Wanyan established dominance over their neighbours and created a semblance of Jurchen unity, which the Liao recognized by conferring the title of military governor upon their chieftains.

As the Wanyan clan consolidated their control over the Jurchens, relations with the Liao became increasingly strained. The Jurchens resented the behaviour of Liao officials at Ningjiang, the main border trading post, who constantly cheated them. The Liao placed on them the obligation of supplying the Liao emperor with gyrfalcons called haidongqing, only bred on the coastal regions and required the Jurchens to fight across the territory of their neighbours, the Five Nations, to access. Liao envoys also habitually beat their village elders and sexually abused their women.

In late 1112 when Tianzuo was on a fishing expedition to the Huntong River (modern Songhua River), the Wanyan chieftain Aguda refused to dance for the emperor as a show of submission. Although Tianzuo initially wanted to execute him for his act of defiance, he was dissuaded from this course by his chancellor, Xiao Fengxian. Aguda was elected ruler of the Jurchens in the following year and began harassing the Liao for the return of a Jurchen chieftain who opposed Wanyan hegemony and had taken refuge in Liao territory. In the late autumn of 1114 Aguda attacked Ningjiang. Tianzuo underestimated the threat posed by Aguda and the Liao armies sent against the Jurchen forces were defeated twice, leading to demoralization among Khitan generals. By the end of the year, the Jurchens and had conquered several cities and some neighboring tribes had also joined them. Negotiations with the newly founded Jin dynasty failed and another attempt by the Liao to fight back was foiled by a conspiracy to depose Tianzuo. The conspirators were defeated, but within a short period, two rebellions by Balhae descendants also rocked the dynasty. The second rebellion was defeated by Jin forces, resulting in the loss of the entire region east of the Liao River. By the end of 1117, Jin forces had crossed the Liao River and conquered several cities.

A lull in combat occurred because the Jin had stretched their resources too thin and a rebellion at the Jin Eastern Capital required their attention. This brief interlude was no less kind to the Liao, which was plagued by famine, local rebellions, and defections to the Jin. Hostilities renewed in the spring of 1020 when Aguda broke off negotiations. The Jin captured the Supreme Capital in mid-1120 and stopped its advance to escape the summer heat. In the spring of 1121, another conspiracy to depose Tianzuo resulted in the defection of a Liao general who led Jin forces to conquer the Central Capital in the winter of 1121–22. Tianzuo put his uncle in charge of the Southern Capital and fled westward in search of fresh recruits for his army. The Tanguts contributed troops to the effort due to their fear of a Jurchen invasion, but the combined Khitan-Tangut army was also defeated by the Jin. Both the Southern and Western Capitals fell to the Jin in 1122.

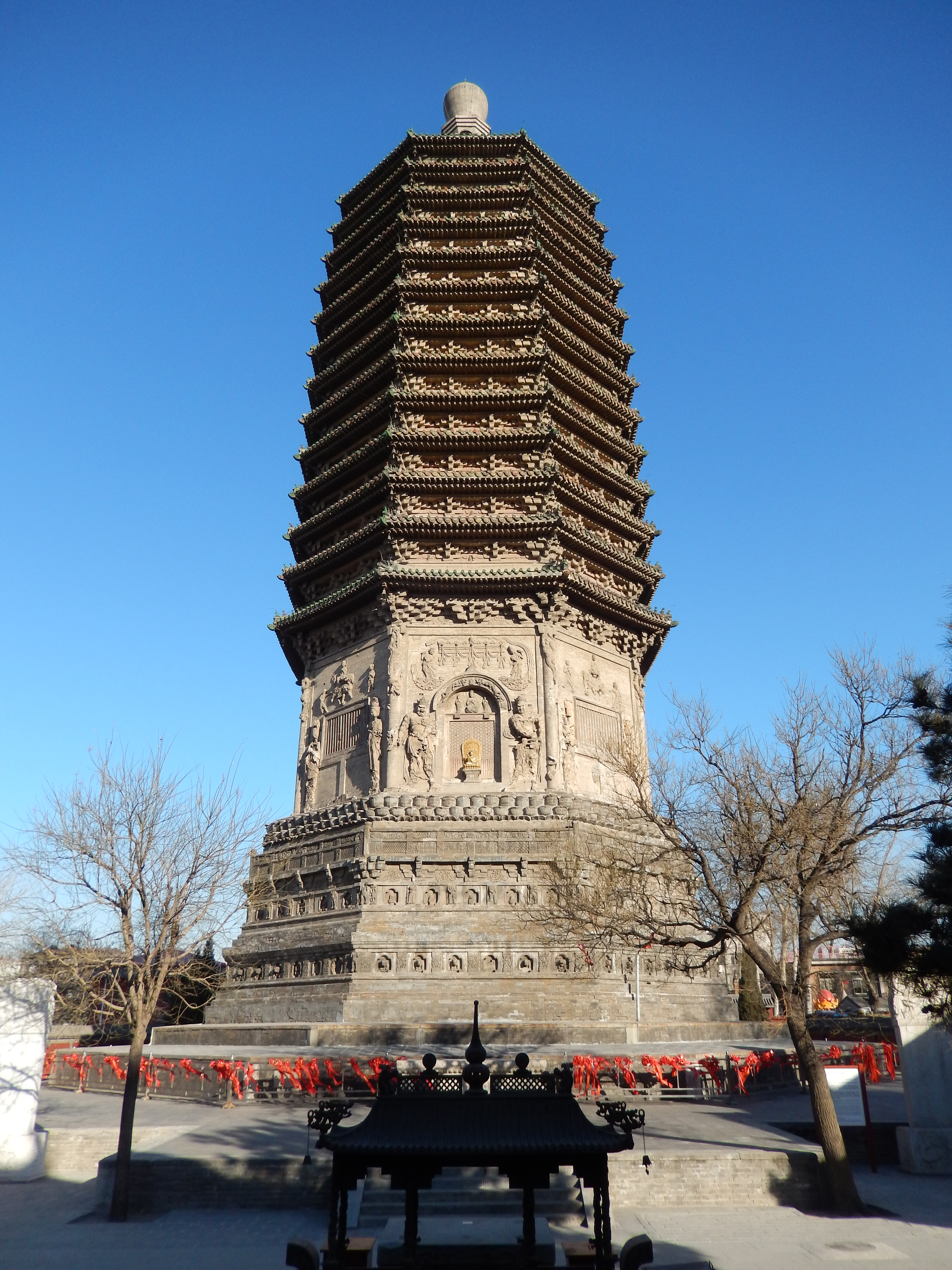
The Tianning Temple Pagoda, a Buddhist structure built at Liao Nanjing ("Southern Capital", modern Beijing) in 1120 during the last years of the Liao dynasty

The remaining Khitans fled in two groups to the west. One group led by Xiao Gan fled to Western Xia where they set up a short lived Xi dynasty that lasted five months before Gan died at the hands of his own troops. The other group, led by Yelü Dashi, joined Tianzuo at the Xia border. In the early summer of 1123, Dashi was captured by the Jin and forced to lead them to Tianzuo's camp, where the entire imperial family except for Tianzuo and one son were captured. Tianzuo sought refuge with Emperor Chongzong of Western Xia, who while initially receptive, changed his mind after warnings from the Jurchens and declared himself a vassal of Jin in 1124. Tianzuo fled further north into the steppes where he traded his clothes for food from the Khongirad. In spite of all these setbacks, Tianzuo still held onto the delusion of retaking the Western and Southern Capitals, and attacked nearby prefectures. Dashi, who had rejoined Tianzuo, grew tired of his behaviour and left for the west. Tianzuo was captured in early 1125 and taken to the Jin court where he held the title of "king of the seashore" (haipin wang). According to the History of Liao, Tianzuo died at the age of 54 in 1128.

=== Qara Khitai ===
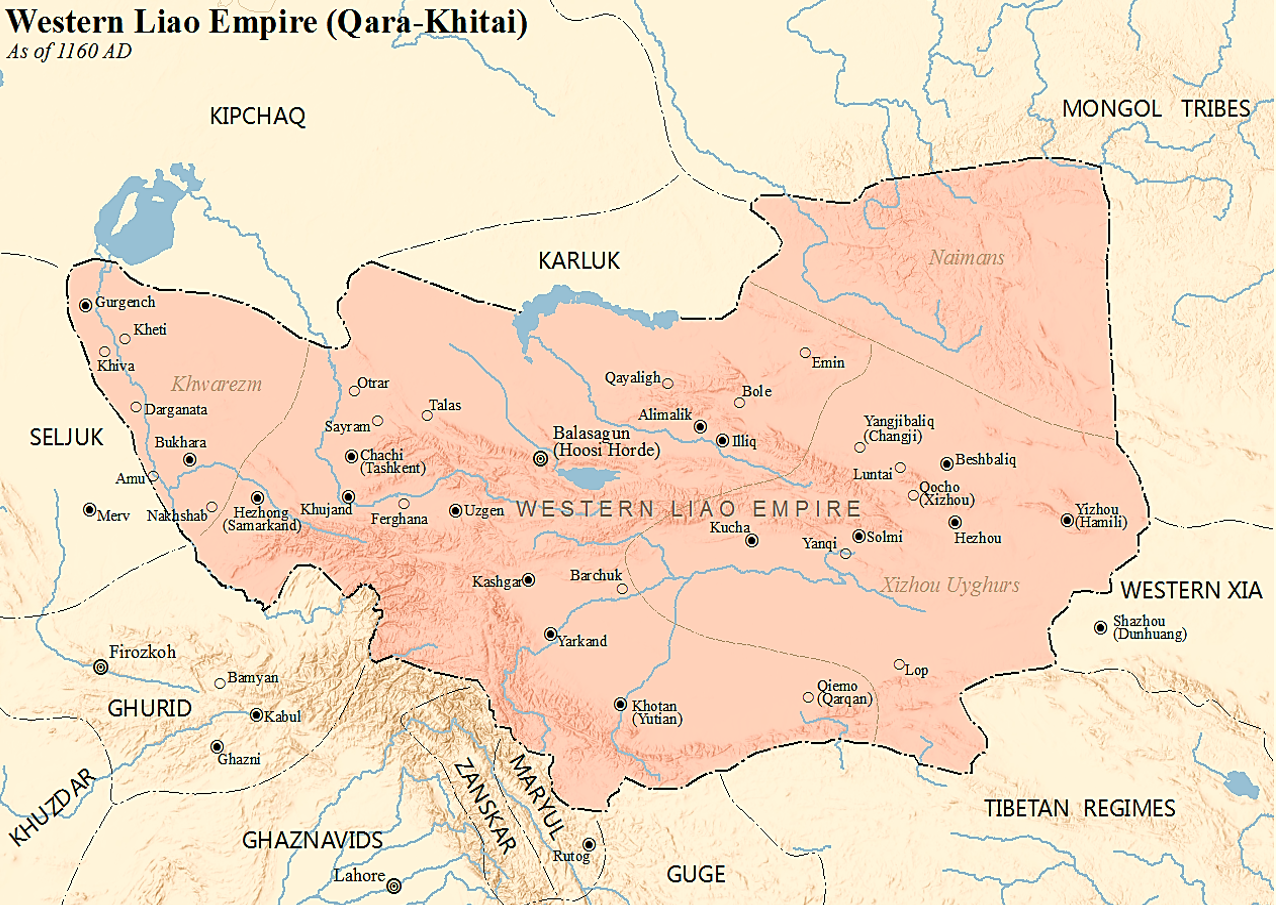
The Qara Khitai empire in 1160

Yelü Dashi fled northwest and established his headquarter at the military garrison of Kedun (Zhenzhou) on the Orkhon River. Dashi secured the allegiance of the garrison forces numbering 20,000 and set himself as gurkhan (universal khan). In 1130, Dashi led his host further west in search of new territory. Within a year, he had established himself as suzerain of Qocho and gained a foothold in Transoxiana. After conquering the Karakhanid city of Balasaghun (in modern Kyrgyzstan), he attempted to reclaim former Liao territory, which ended in disaster. Failing in that endeavor, Dashi established a permanent Khitan state in Central Asia known as the Qara Khitai or the Western Liao dynasty. The new Liao empire expanded to the Aral Sea, defeating the Kara-Khanid Khanate and Seljuk Empire at the Battle of Qatwan in 1141, and establishing their dominance in the region. With several key trading cities, the Qara Khitai was a multicultural state that showed evidence of religious tolerance. "Qara," which means black, corresponds to the Liao's dynastic colour black and its dynastic element water.

Yelü Dashi's dynasty was usurped by the Naimans under Kuchlug in 1211 and traditional Chinese, Persian, and Arab sources consider the usurpation to be the end of the dynasty. The empire ended with the Mongol conquest in 1218.

== Government ==
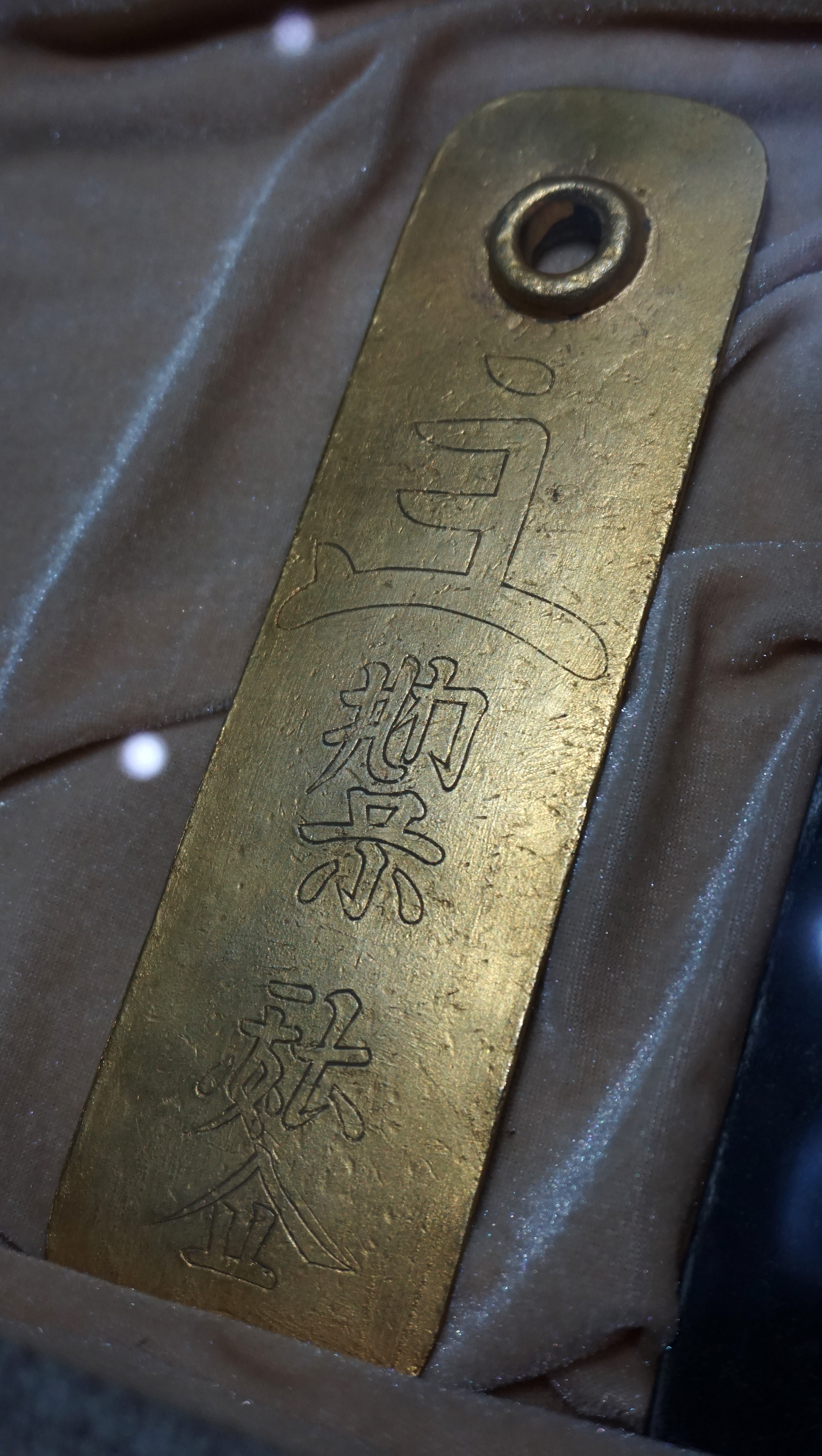
Liao paiza authorizing an imperial decree with the utmost urgency

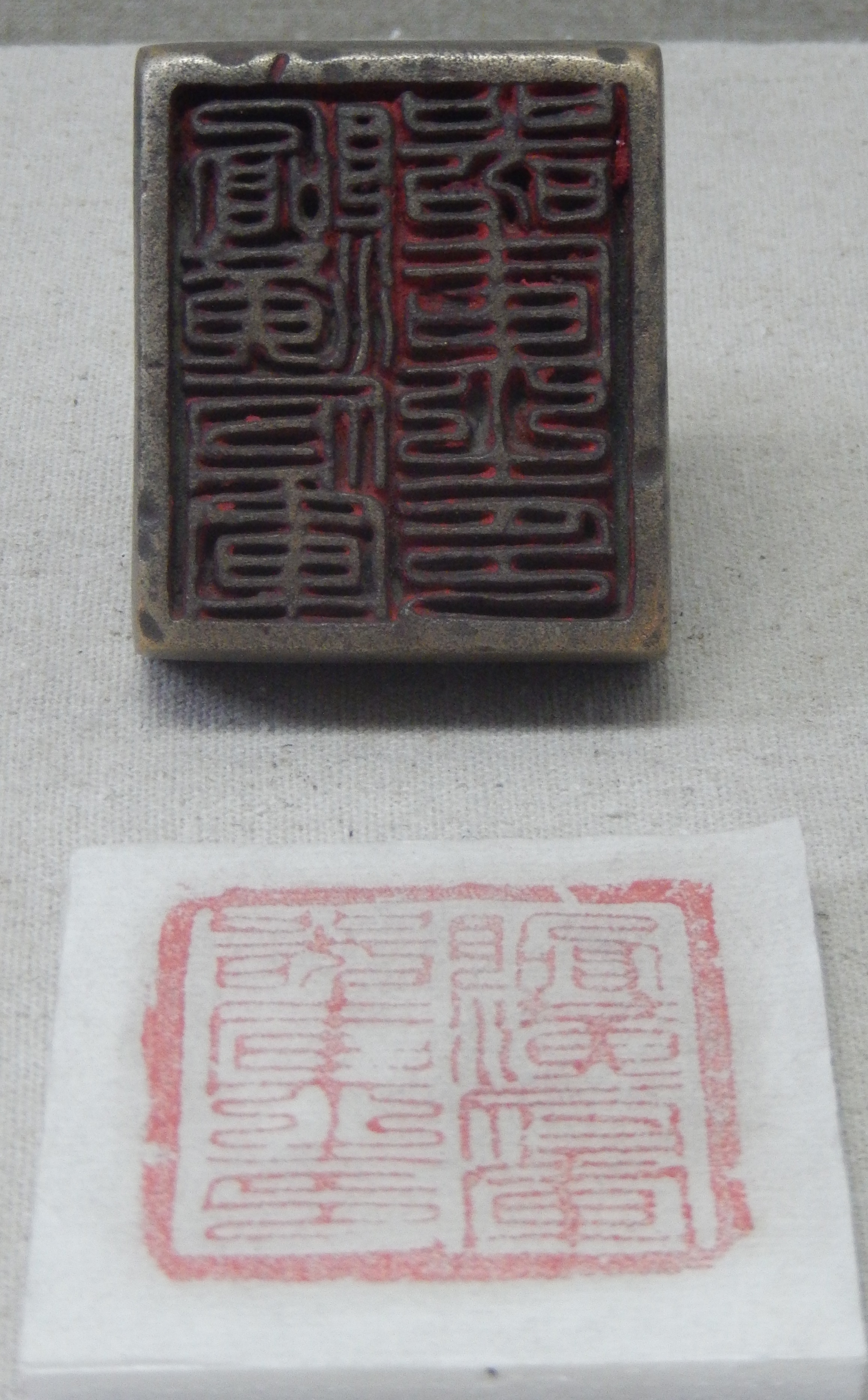
Liao seal with the Chinese inscription 臨潢府軍器庫之印 "Seal of the Armoury of Linhuang Prefecture"

At its height, the Liao dynasty controlled what is now Shanxi, Hebei, Liaoning, Jilin, Heilongjiang, and Inner Mongolia provinces in China, as well as northern portions of the Korean peninsula, portions of the Russian Far East, and much of the country of Mongolia. The peak population is estimated at 750,000 Khitans and two to three million ethnic Han Chinese.

=== Enthronement ceremonies ===
There were two ceremonies for the ascension of Khitan leaders, the Chaice Yi (Recognition Ceremony) and Zaisheng Yi (Rebirth Ceremony). These ceremonies were created during the reign of Zuwu khagan (r. 735–745) when leaders were elected. The Liao dynasty inherited these ceremonies as symbolic rituals for the enthronement of the emperor. The Rebirth Ceremony was then performed every 12 years by the emperor and confirmed his right to rule. The Rebirth Ceremony was a ritual that involved burning a special building that the emperor entered in order to be reborn, ceremonial actors, libations, ritual objects, incantations, and undressing and redressing in special clothes. While the rite was officially restricted to only the male ruler (emperor), both the regent Empress Dowager Chengtian (Xiao Yanyan) and Fatian (Xiao Noujin) undertook the Rebirth Ceremony to cement their rule.

=== Law and administration ===
The Liao employed two governments that operated in parallel with each other: a Northern Administration responsible for Khitan and nomadic peoples who mostly lived in the northern half of Liao territory, and a Southern Administration for the settled Han population in the southern half of Liao territory. Initially these two governments did not have strict territorial boundaries but Emperor Shizong (947–951) formally delineated their territorial limits early in his reign. The newly delineated Northern Administration had large populations of non-nomadic Han, Balhae, and Uighur populations, resulting in its own internal northern and southern governments.

The Northern Administration was ruled as if it was a tribal leader's personal retinue. Many of the governmental appointments dealt with tribal affairs, herds, and retainers serving the imperial house, and most powerful and high-ranking positions dealt with military affairs. The overwhelming majority of officeholders were Khitans, mainly from the imperial Yelü clan and the Xiao consort clan. The tribal borderlands of the Liao empire were never clearly defined and constituted a region of loosely subject peoples who sometimes fled or assimilated into the Liao polity. Two groups proved particularly difficult to deal with: the Jurchens in the northeast and the Zubu tribes in Mongolia.

The Southern Administration was more heavily structured and modeled after the Tang dynasty's government. Many of the low- and medium-ranked officials in the Southern Administration were Han Chinese. Certain ethnic Han families in particular, descended from meritorious officials, played an important role in the Liao government and became powerful clans: the Han, the Zhao, the Liu and the Ma.

The Liao dynasty was further divided into five "circuits", each with a capital city. The general idea for this system was taken from the Balhae, although no captured Balhae cities were made into circuit capitals. The five capital cities were Shangjing (Supreme Capital), located in modern-day Inner Mongolia; Nanjing (Southern Capital), located near modern-day Beijing; Dongjing (Eastern Capital), located near modern-day Liaoning; Zhongjing (Central Capital) located in modern-day Hebei province near the Laoha river; and Xijing (Western Capital), located near modern-day Datong. Each circuit was headed by a powerful viceroy who had the autonomy to tailor policies to meet the needs of the population within his circuit. Circuits were further subdivided into administrations called fu (府), which were metropolitan areas surrounding capital cities, and outside of metropolitan areas were divided into prefectures called zhou (州), which themselves were divided into counties called xian (縣).

Despite these administrative systems, important state decisions were still made by the emperor. The emperor met with officials from the Northern and Southern Administrations twice a year, but aside from that the emperor spent much of his time attending to tribal affairs outside of the capital cities.

=== Military ===
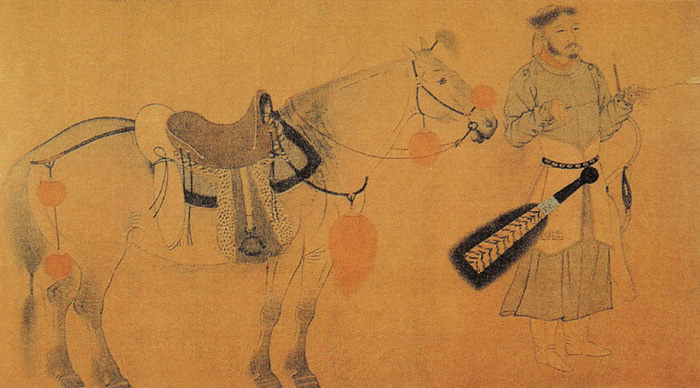
Horse and Archer, believed to have been painted by Yelü Bei.

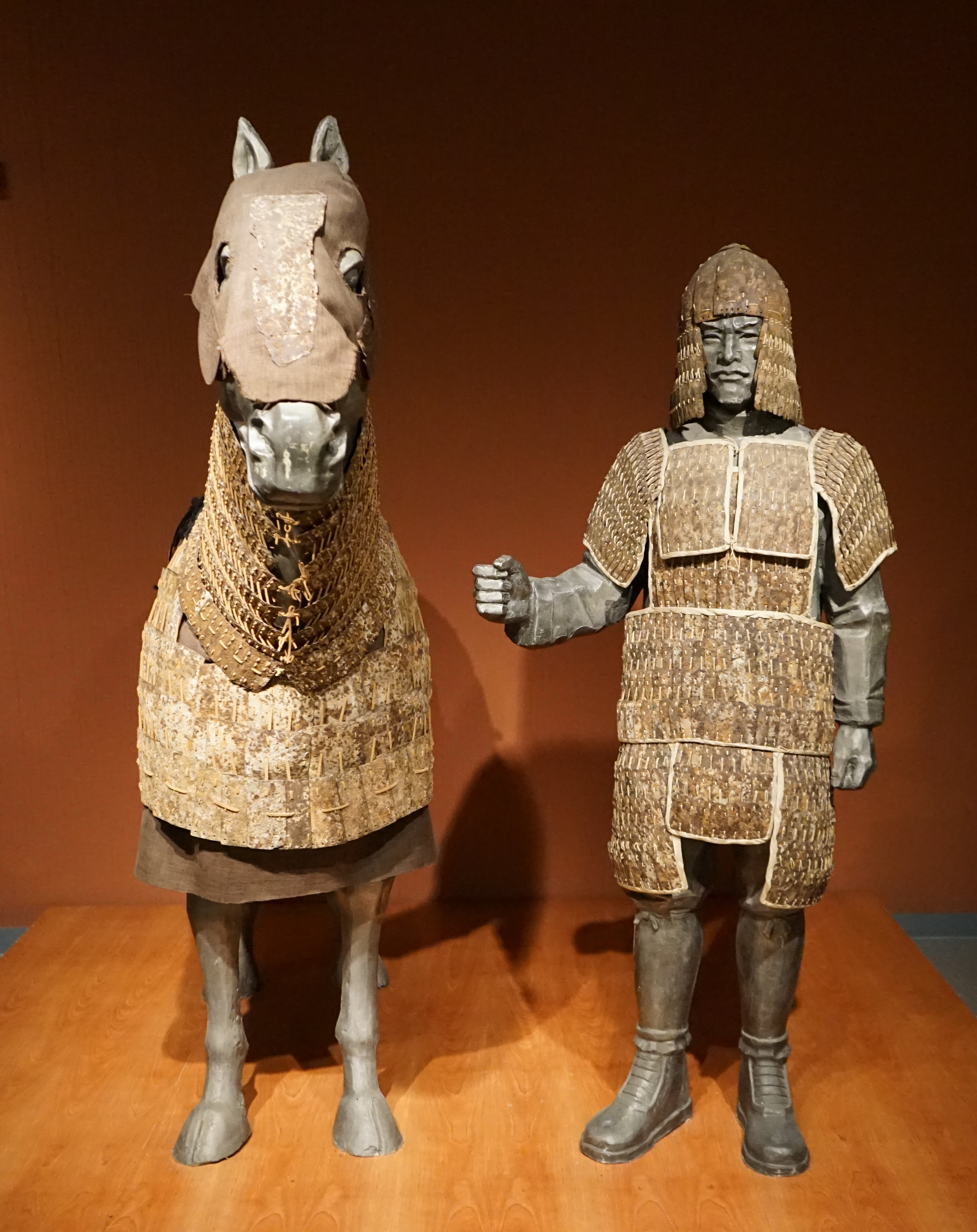
Liao dynasty cavalry armour

The Khitans were originally divided into 8 tribes each led by a commander replaced once every three years. Abaoji then declared himself king to prevent the other clans from replacing him. The tribes convened for discussions for mobilization or warfare. From these military origins developed the Khitan custom of convening assemblies. After ascending the throne, Abaoji divided his own Yila tribe into two and entrusted them to members of his family, requiring him to establish a new guard by drawing recruits from each tribe.

The Liao army was originally 2,000 men picked from various tribes and cities as Abaoji's personal retinue. Another 2,000 men were added from captives taken from Balhae and Jingzhou. This retinue became an orda, the emperor's private army that contained 15,000 households, and could field up to 6,000 horsemen. The Liao nobles each had their own private domain (touxia) with private military forces which the Liao government "borrowed" for campaign. These domains consisted of "mandatory prefectures and counties" which were founded by nobles or chieftains to resettle their captives. According to the History of Liao, the Liao nobles treated the state as if it was their family. They provided private armies to assist the government during times of war. The larger ordas comprised up to a thousand or more horsemen while smaller ones several hundred horsemen. By the end of the dynasty, the emperor's ordas together constituted 81,000 Khitan households and 124,000 Balhae and Chinese households, which together could field up to 101,000 horsemen. Each orda had Control Offices (tixiasi) stationed in 4 of the 5 Liao capitals and in the ethnic Han-populated Pingzhou and Fengshengzhou prefectures, to manage the military mobilization of the parts of the local population which were attached to their orda. Every successive emperor created a new orda, leaving the previous emperor's orda to guard his predecessor's mausoleum. Military affairs came under the authority of the Northern administration, =and therefore Southern administration officials had to report to the Northern administration on military matters rather than directly to the emperor.

The Liao Army was composed of 3 sections: the Orda, who were the elite personal cavalry of the Emperor, the tribal cavalry of Khitans and an auxiliary force of non-Khitan tribes, and militia infantry of Han Chinese and other sedentary peoples, who also provided the foot archers and catapult crews. Appanage territories were often granted to commanders. Khitan tribal manpower was still available for service both in China and in the steppe, but tribal chieftains living in towns became more detached from the tribal structure. The Khitan forces therefore enjoyed both the grain supply and weapon manufacturing facilities of sedentary society and the horse and livestock supply to maintain mobility and meat rations in the field. The Khitans hence had an edge over the Turkic tribes on the steppe.

The core of the Liao army was composed of heavy armoured cavalry. In battle they arrayed light cavalry in the front and two layers of armoured cavalry in the back. Even foragers were armoured. Units of Khitan heavy cavalry were organised in groups of 500 to 700 men. Unlike some other empires originating from nomadic tribes, the Khitans preferred to fight in dense heavy cavalry formations rather than the wide formations of horse archers.

== Society and culture ==
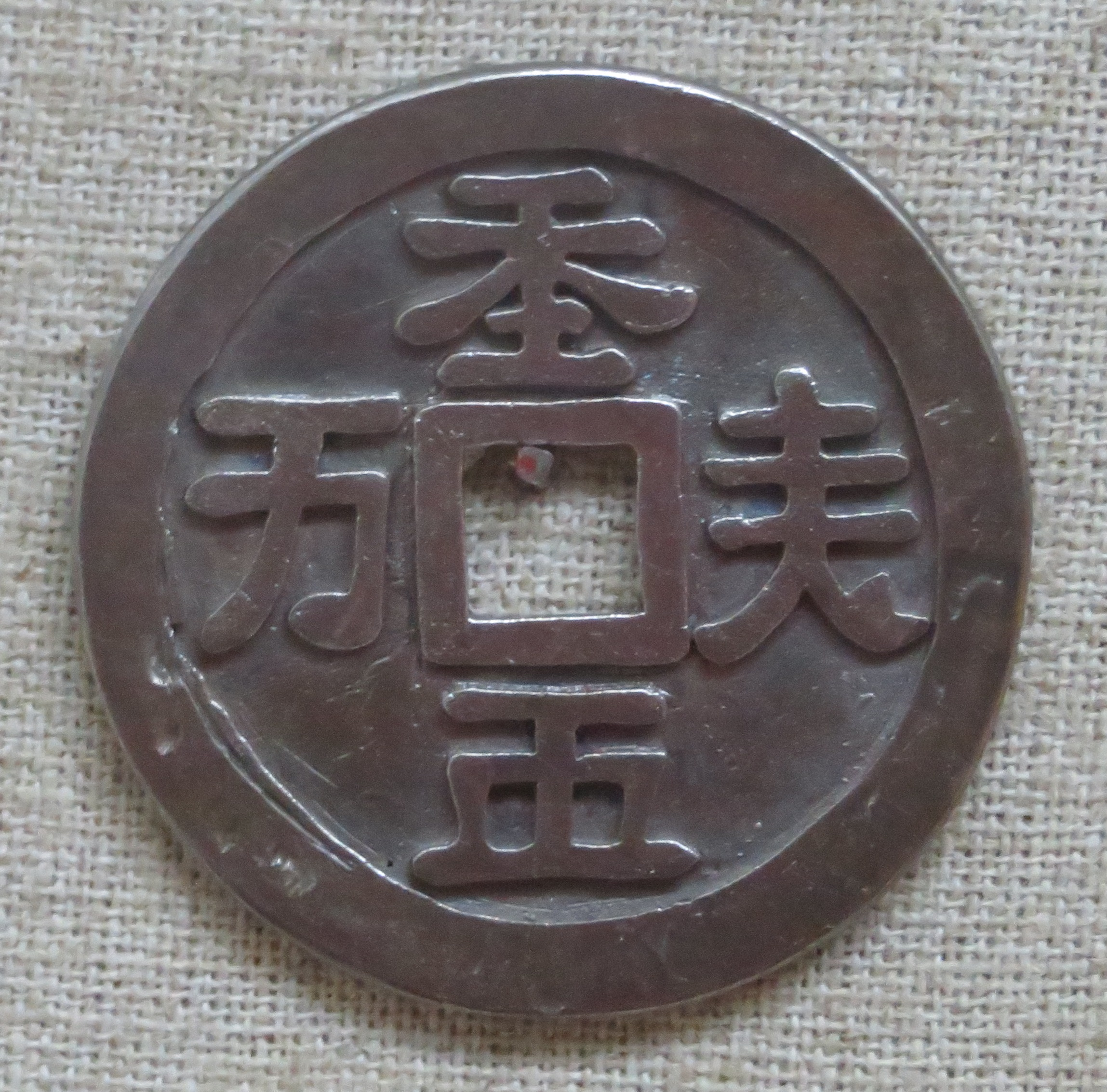
Liao silver coin in Khitan large script translated as "天朝萬順" (Heavenly Dynasty – Myriad [affairs are] Favourable).

=== Language ===
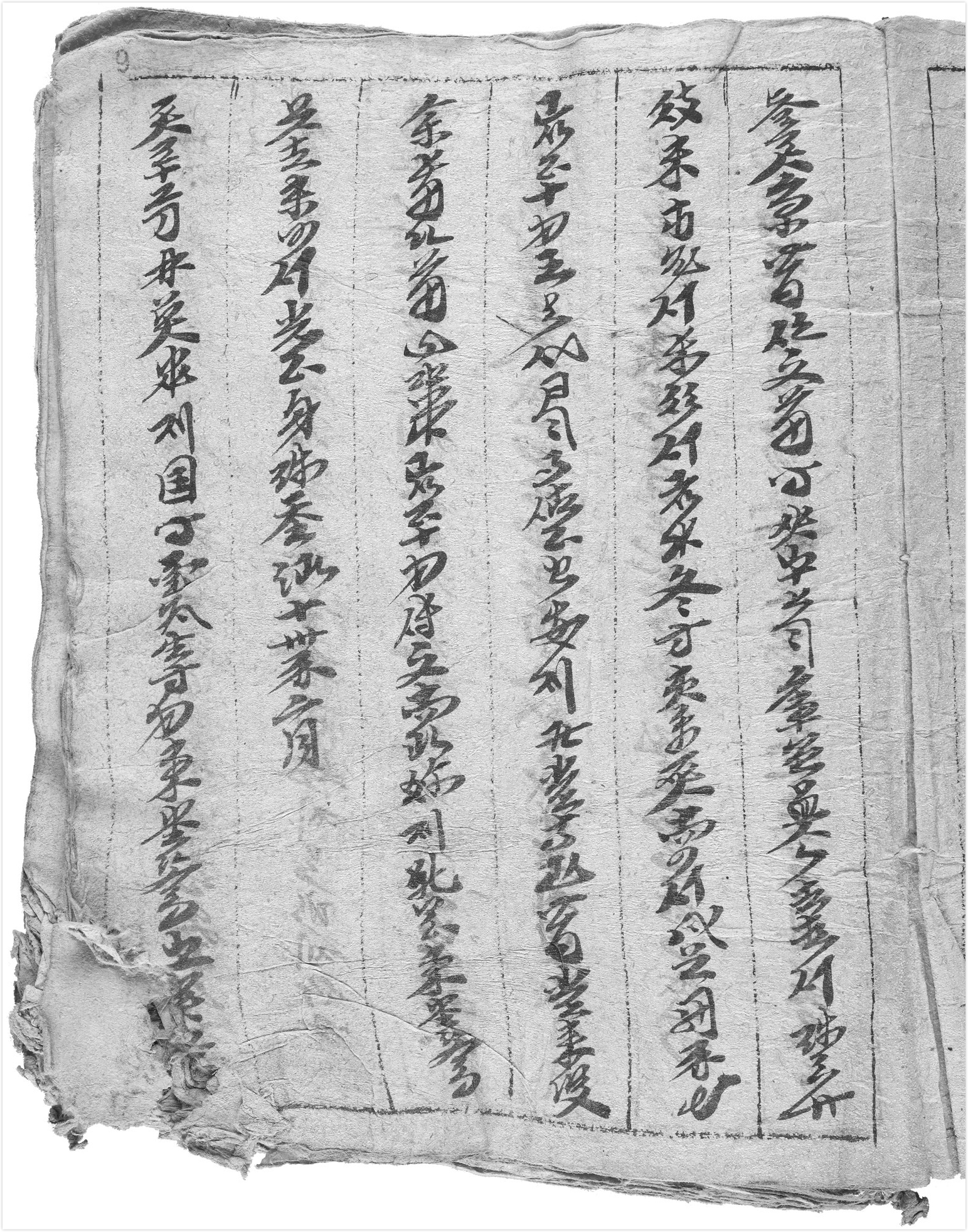
The only extant manuscript in the Khitan language, Folio 9 of manuscript codex Nova N 176

The Khitan language is closely related to the Mongolic language family; some broader definitions of the Mongolic family include Khitan as a member. It is distantly related to the Mongolian language with many loan words from Tungusic languages and Turkic languages.

Prior to their conquest of north China and the establishment of the Liao dynasty, the Khitans had no written language. In 920 the first of two Khitan scripts, the Khitan large script, was developed. A second script, the Khitan small script, was developed in 925. Both scripts are based on the same spoken language, and both contain a mix of logographs and phonographs. Despite surface level similarities to Chinese characters, the Khitan scripts are functionally unintelligible to Chinese readers, and neither scripts have been fully deciphered to this day. The script had some 3,000 characters and was used to translate Chinese texts into the Khitan language. However the script's circulation was banned outside Khitan territory and practically none of it has survived into modern times. Only a single manuscript text in the Khitan large script is known (Nova N 176), and no manuscripts in the Khitan small script are known.

Most surviving specimens of both Khitan scripts are epitaph inscriptions on stone tablets, as well as a number of inscriptions on coins, mirrors and seals. The Liao emperors could read Chinese, and while there were some Chinese works translated into Khitan during the Liao dynasty, the Confucian classics, which served as the core guide to the administration of government in China, are not known to have been translated into Khitan. Most poetry and prose such as The Qingning Collection by Emperor Daozong were written in Chinese. The Liao literati elite were well versed in Chinese writing and all official external communications such as edicts, memorials, and documents to foreigners were conducted in Chinese.

=== Status of women ===
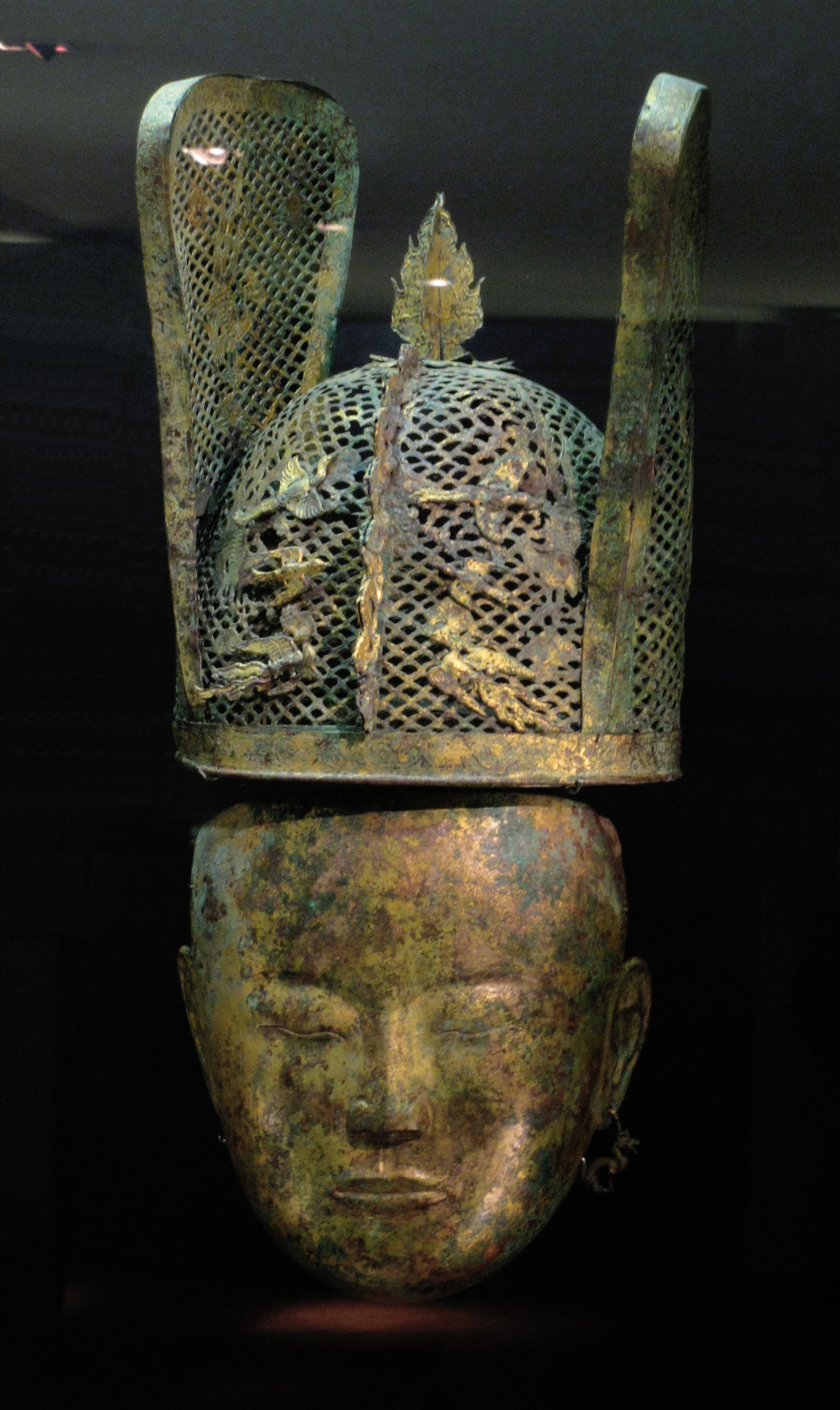
Liao funerary mask and crown (female)

Khitan women were taught how to hunt, and managed family herds, flocks, finances, and property when their husbands were at war. Upper-class women were able to hold governmental and military posts. A number of elite women such as the Liao empresses Shulü Ping (Empress Yingtian), her niece Xiao Wen (Empress Jing'an), and grand-niece Xiao Yanyan (Empress Chengtian) took part in military affairs, accompanied the emperor in battle, commanded their own armies, and went hunting. Han Chinese living under the Liao dynasty were not forced to adopt Khitan practices, and while some Han Chinese did, many did not.

In Khitan culture, elites tended to marry women who were their senior. Men usually around the age of sixteen while women married around the age of nineteen, although marriage at a younger age is known for both. Polygamy was practiced by Khitan men who had multiple wives, sometimes marrying a number of women who were sisters in sororate marriage. Over the course of the dynasty, the Khitan elite moved away from having several wives towards the Han practice of having one wife and one or more concubines. This was done largely to smooth over the process of inheritance.

Among Khitan commoners, women did not have arranged marriages and would attract suitors by singing and dancing in the streets. Virginity was not a marriage requirement among the Khitans. Betrothal was seen in Khitan society as equally important to marriage and was difficult to annul. The groom would pledge to work for three years for the bride's family, pay a bride price, and lavish the bride's family with gifts. After three years, the groom was allowed to take the bride back to his home, and the bride would usually cut off all ties with her family. Abduction of marriage-age women was common. Sometimes the abduction as well as sexual intercourse were pre-arranged as part of the courtship process, after which they would return to the woman's home to announce their intention to marry. In other cases, the abduction was non-consensual and resulted in rape. Khitan women had the right to divorce and were able to remarry after divorce.

=== Religion ===
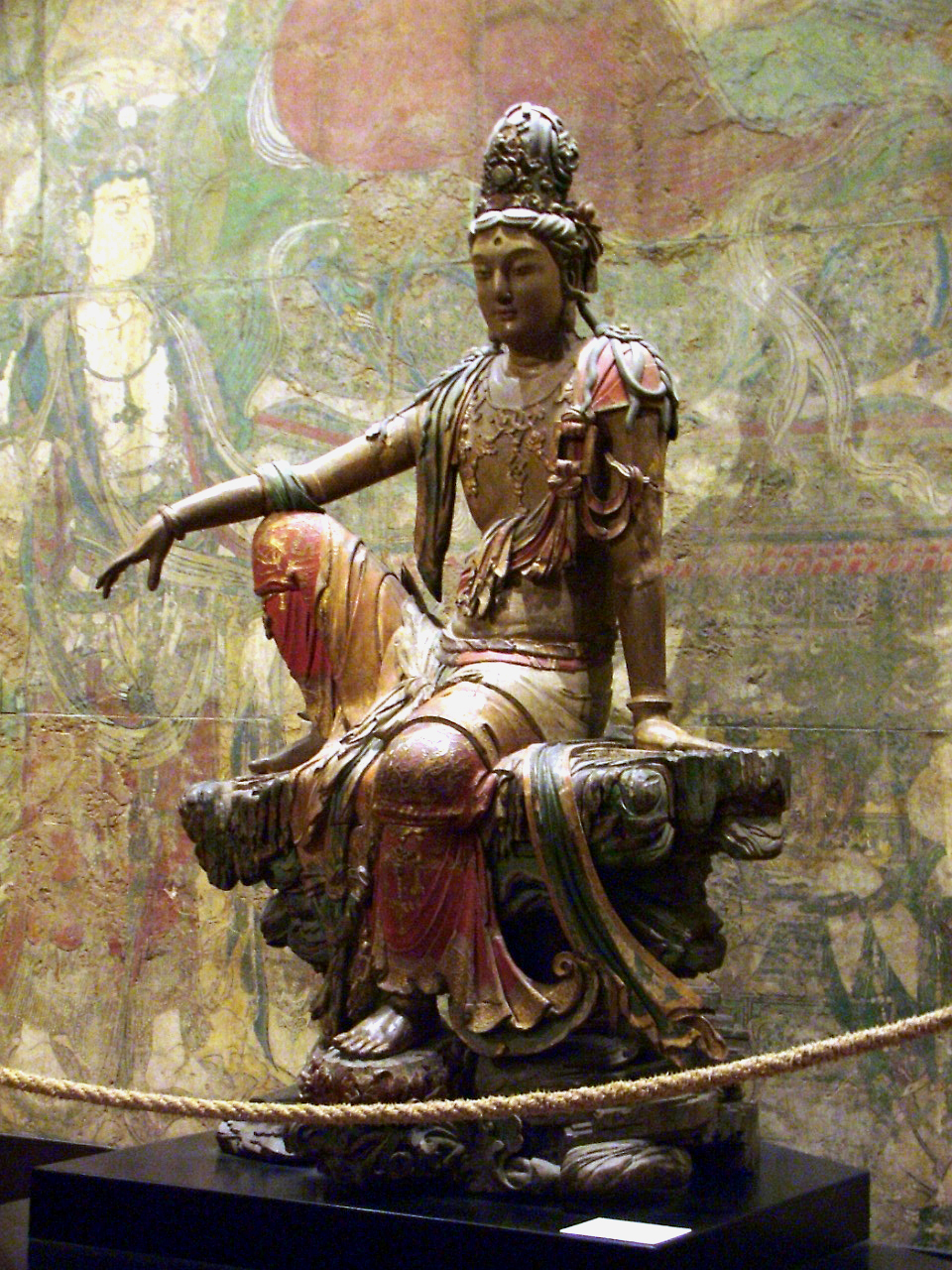
A Liao dynasty polychrome wood-carved statue depicting Guanyin in the Water Moon pose, which raises the right knee and rests the right arm on top of it, symbolizing the divinity of the Pure land, Guanyin's personal paradise, which Guanyin puts off going to until she has saved humanity.

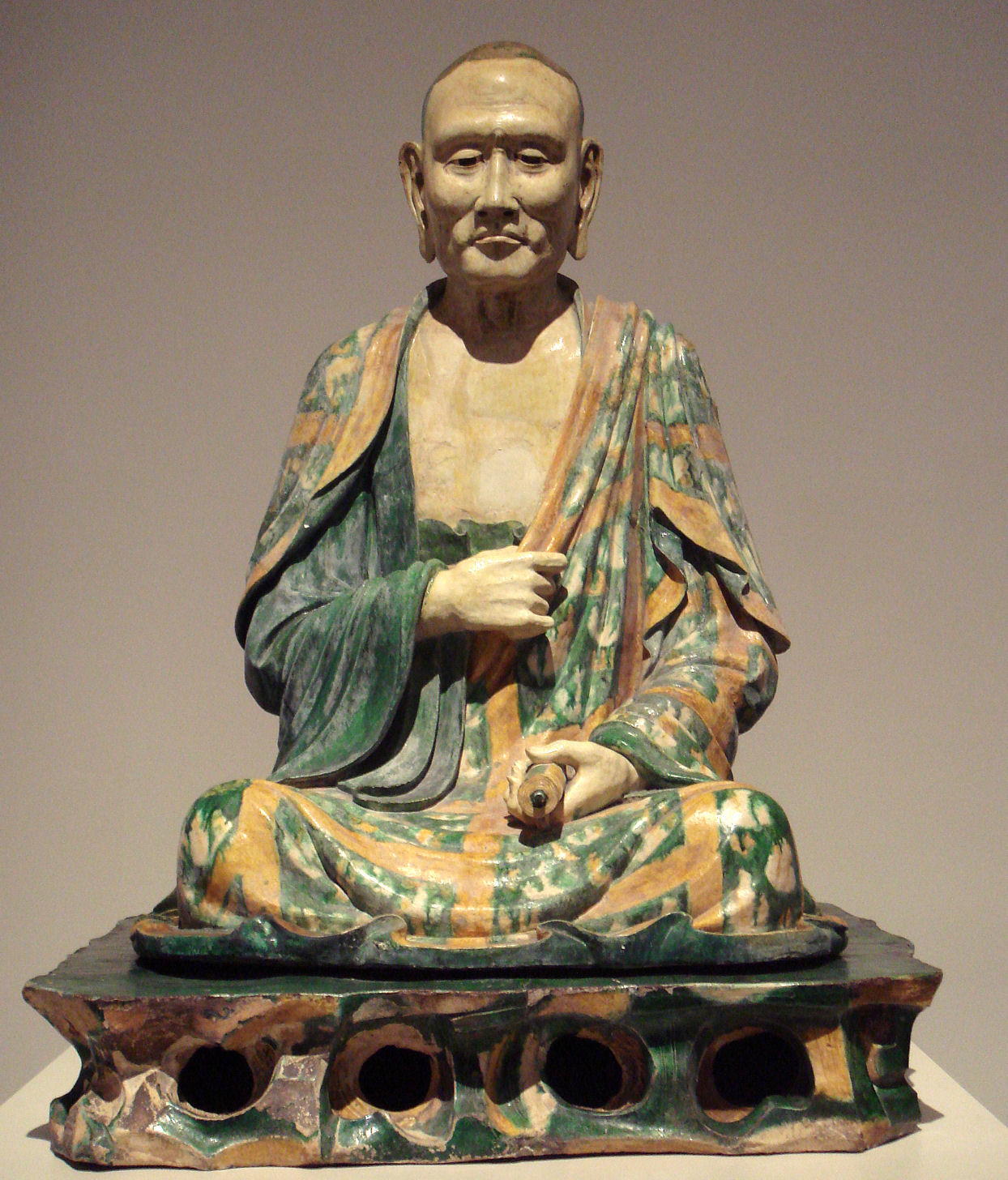
One of the famous set of lifesize Yixian glazed pottery luohans, sancai, early 12th century

Religion in Liao society was a synthesis of Buddhism, Confucianism, Daoism, and Khitan tribal religion. During Abaoji's reign, temples of all three major religions were constructed, but afterwards, imperial patronage was restricted mainly to Buddhism, which by the early tenth century, the majority of Khitans had adopted. The Buddha was considered a protective deity by the Khitans, who named him "The Benevolent King Who Guards the Country." They invoked Buddhism whenever they went to war and made massive offerings to placate the souls of fallen soldiers. The Liao began printing Buddhist texts in the 990s and an entire copy of the Tripitaka was completed in 1075. Portions of it have been found in a pagoda built in 1056. Buddhist scholars living during the time of the Liao dynasty predicted that the mofa (末法), an age in which the three treasures of Buddhism would be destroyed, was to begin in the year 1052. Previous dynasties, including the Sui and Tang, were also concerned with the mofa, although their predictions for when the mofa would start were different from the one selected by the Liao. As early as the Sui dynasty, efforts were made to preserve Buddhist teachings by carving them into stone or burying them. These efforts continued into the Liao dynasty, with Emperor Xingzong funding several projects in the years immediately preceding 1052.

Some elements of traditional Khitan tribal religion continued to be observed. The Khitans worshiped the sun and the ritual position for the emperor was to face the east where the sun rose, unlike Han Chinese emperors, who faced south. Royal dwellings also faced the east. Khitans worshiped spirits of the Muye Mountain, the legendary home of the Khitans' ancestors, and a "Black Mountain." When a Khitan nobleman died, burnt offerings were sacrificed at the full and new moons. The body was exposed for three years in the mountains, after which the bones would be cremated. The Khitan believed that the souls of the dead rested at the Black Mountain, near Rehe Province. Liao burial sites indicate that animistic or shamanistic practices coexisted with Buddhism in marriage and burial ceremonies. Both animal and human sacrifices have been found in Liao tombs alongside indications of Buddhist influence. Khitan hunters offered a sacrifice to the spirit of the animal they were hunting and wore a pelt from the same animal during the hunt. There were festivals to mark the catching of the first fish and wild goose, and annual sacrifices of animals to the sky, earth, ancestors, mountains, rivers, and others. Every male Khitan would sacrifice a white horse, white sheep, and white goose during the Winter solstice. In warfare, they practiced a form of divination where the decision to carry out war was determined by whether or not the shoulder blade of a white sheep cracked while being heated (scapulimancy).

Many elite Khitans, including noblemen and refugees who became the Qara Khitai after the defeat by the Jin dynasty (1115–1234), converted to Confucianism, which they believed had the power to appease nature through power of traditional Confucian rites.

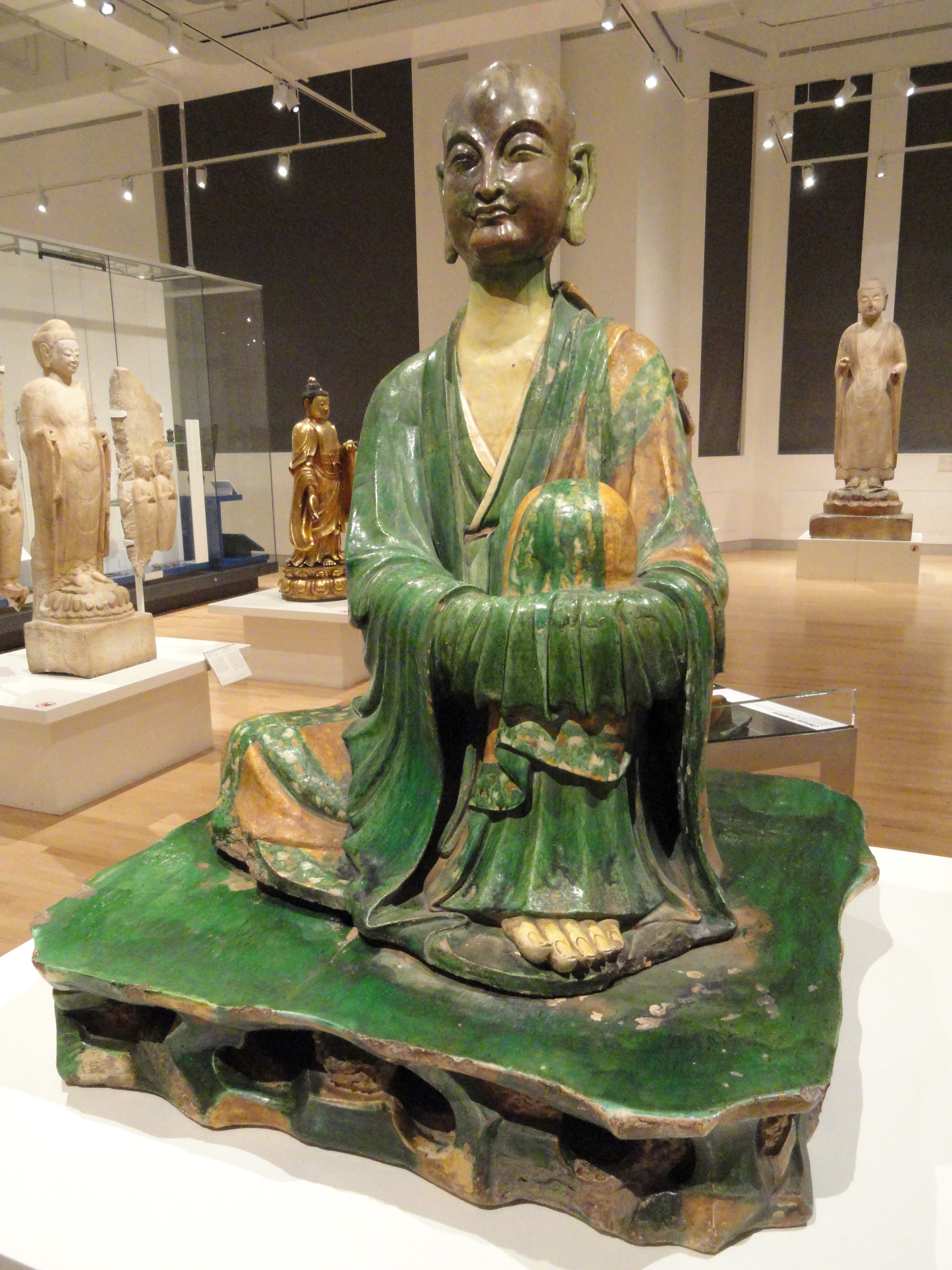
Luohan statue, Liao dynasty, 11th century

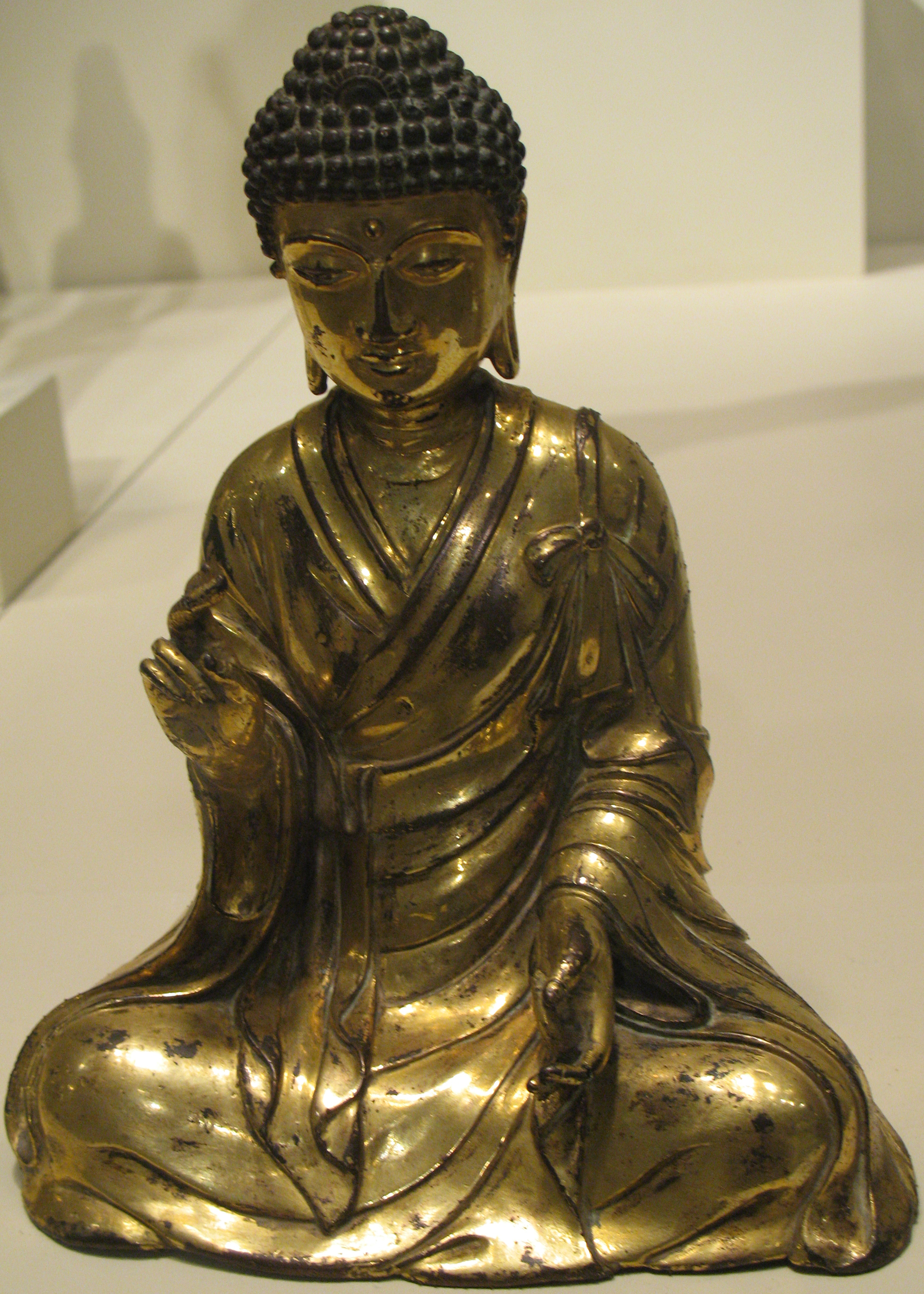
Liao era bronze figure of Gautama Buddha

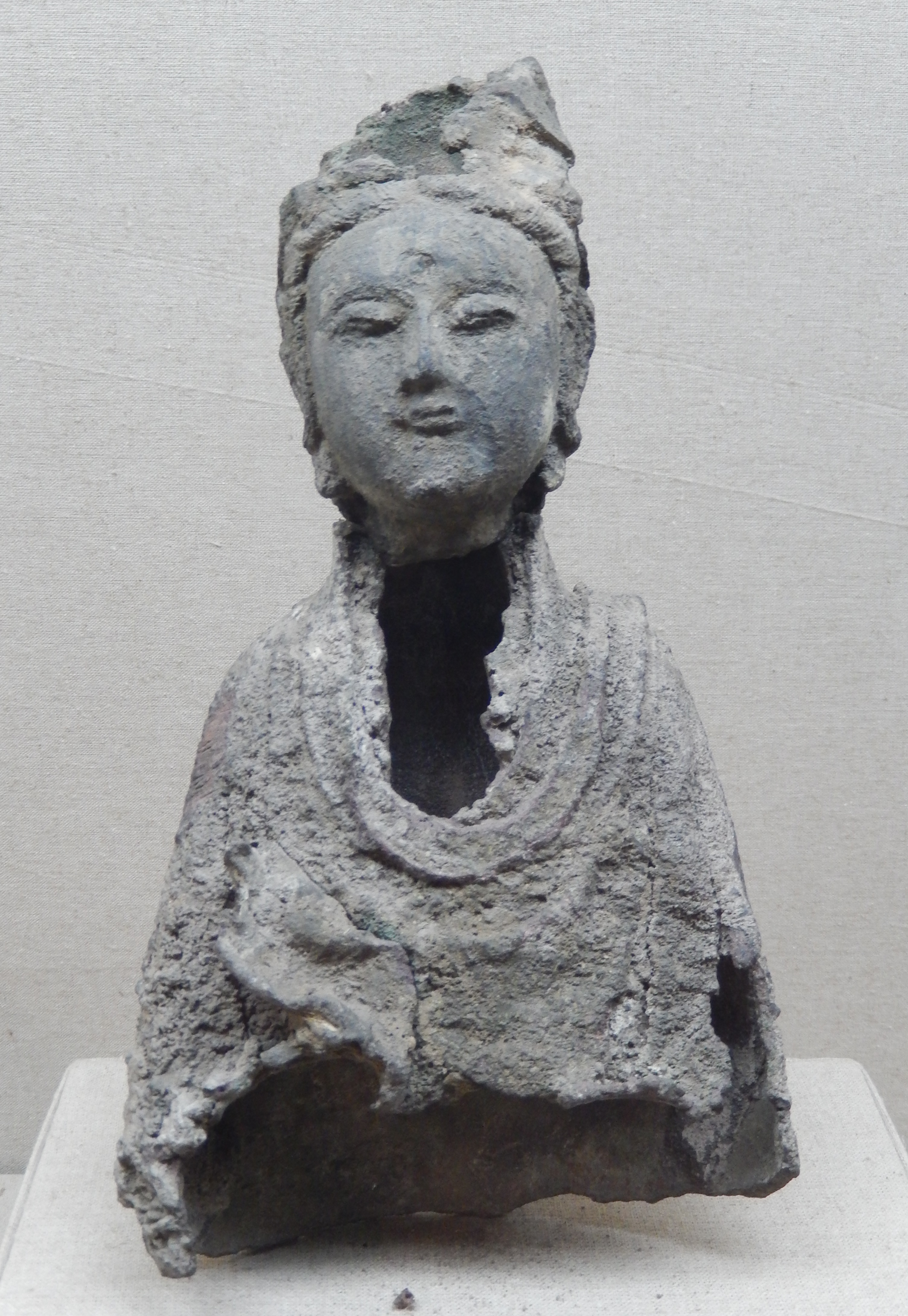
Bronze Guanyin statue from the Chinese section of the Supreme Capital

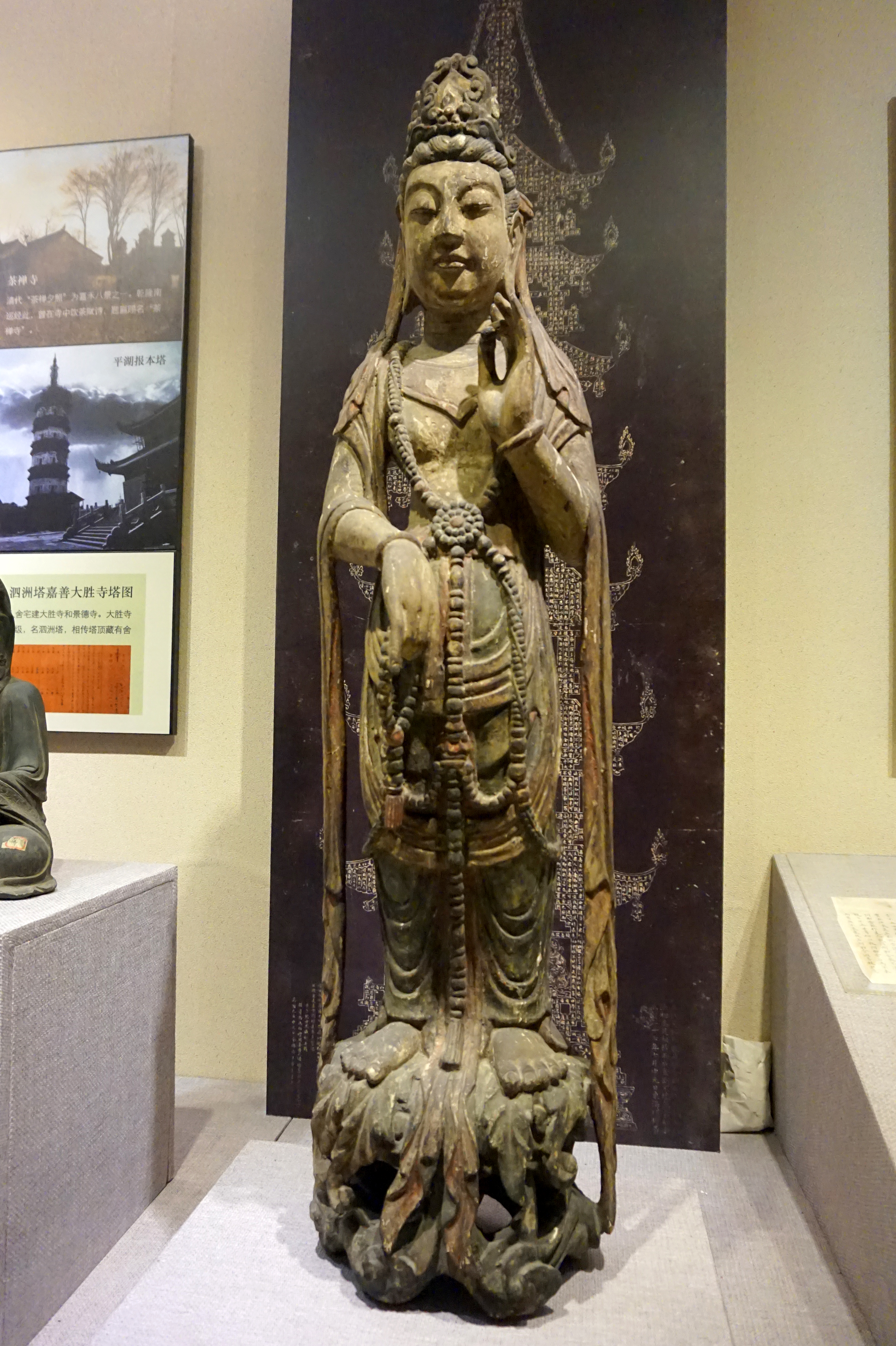
Liao era painted wooden statue of Guanyin

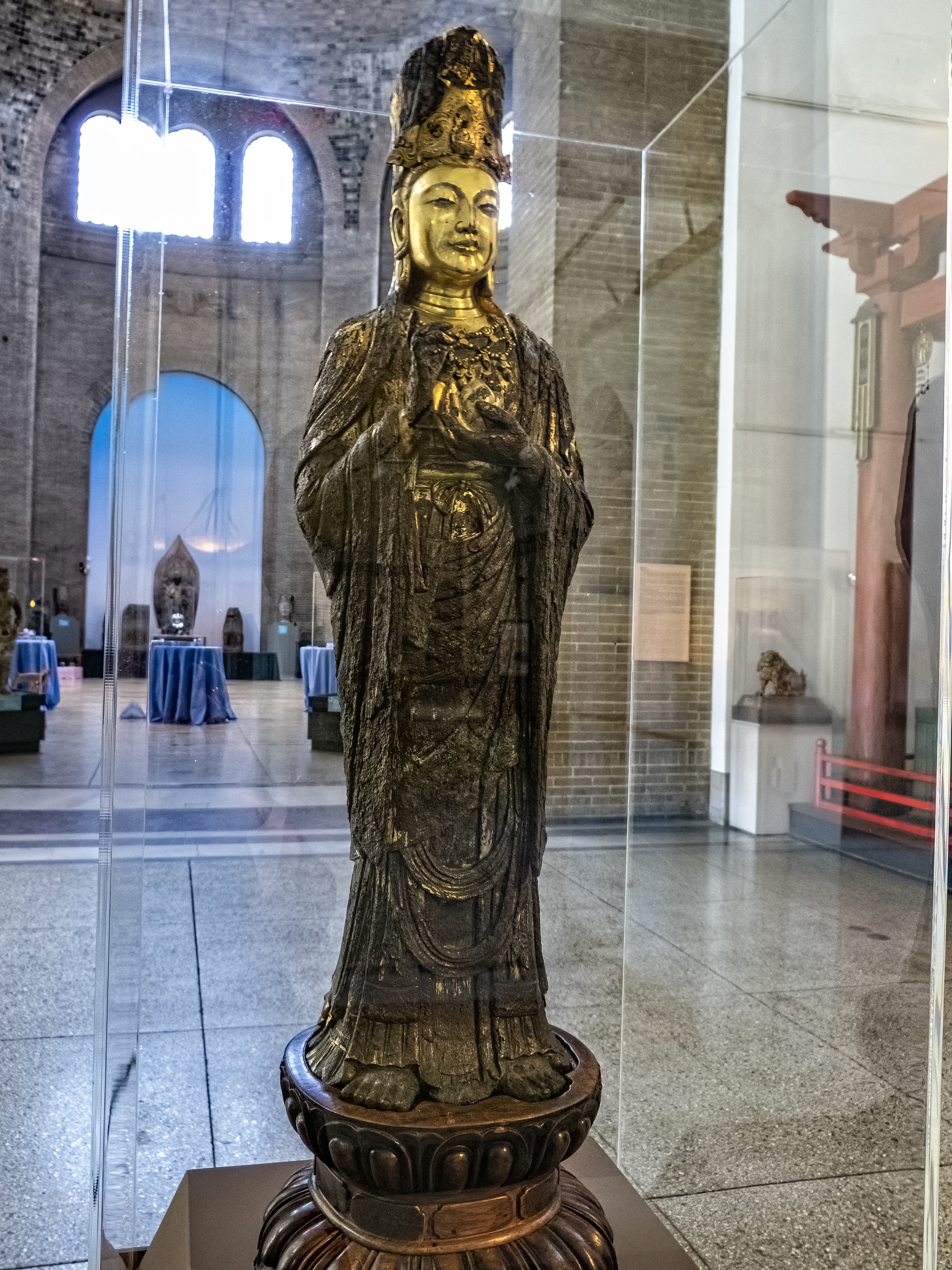
Bronze statue of Guanyin, Liao dynasty, 10th century

=== Burial ===
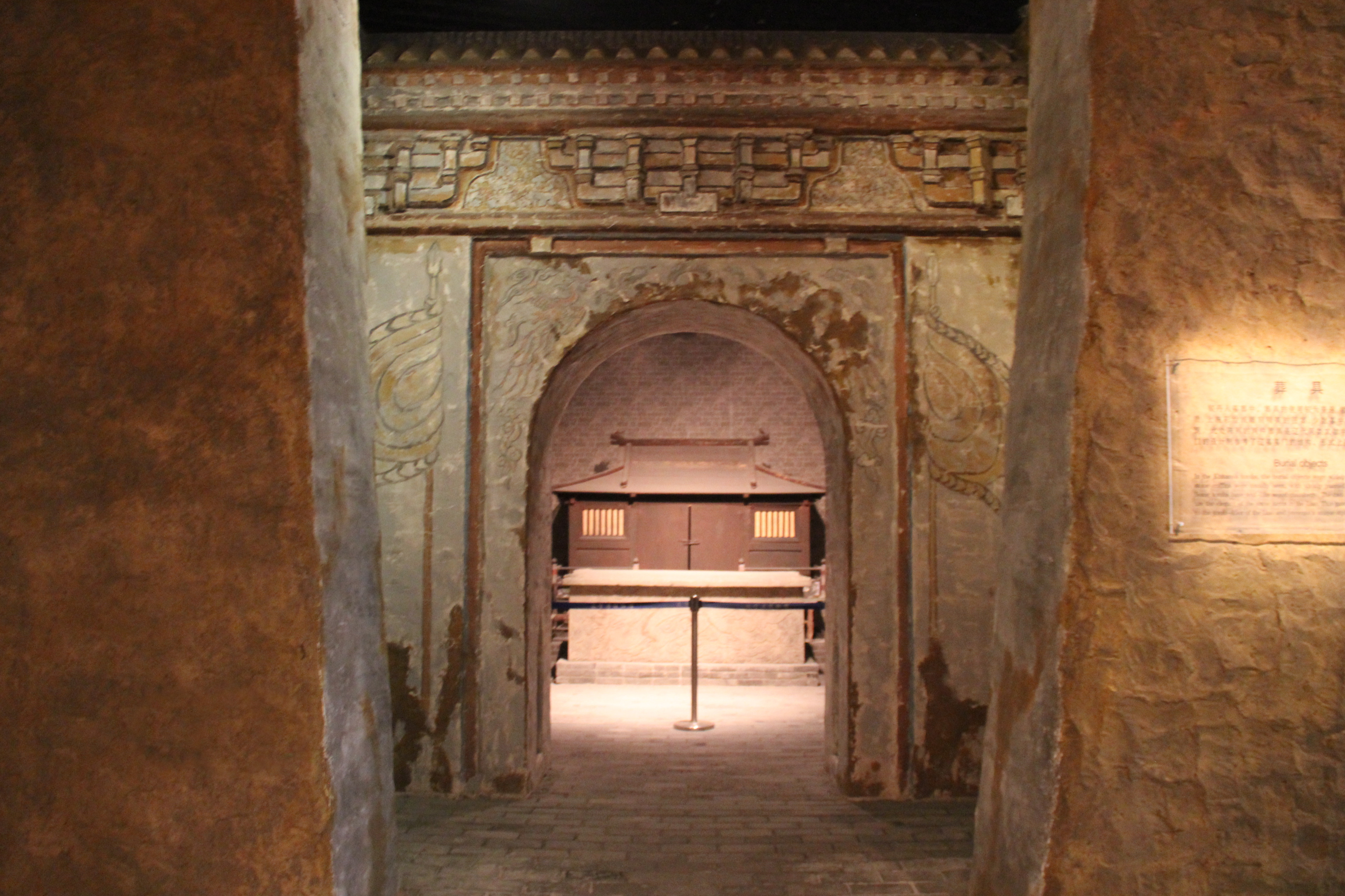
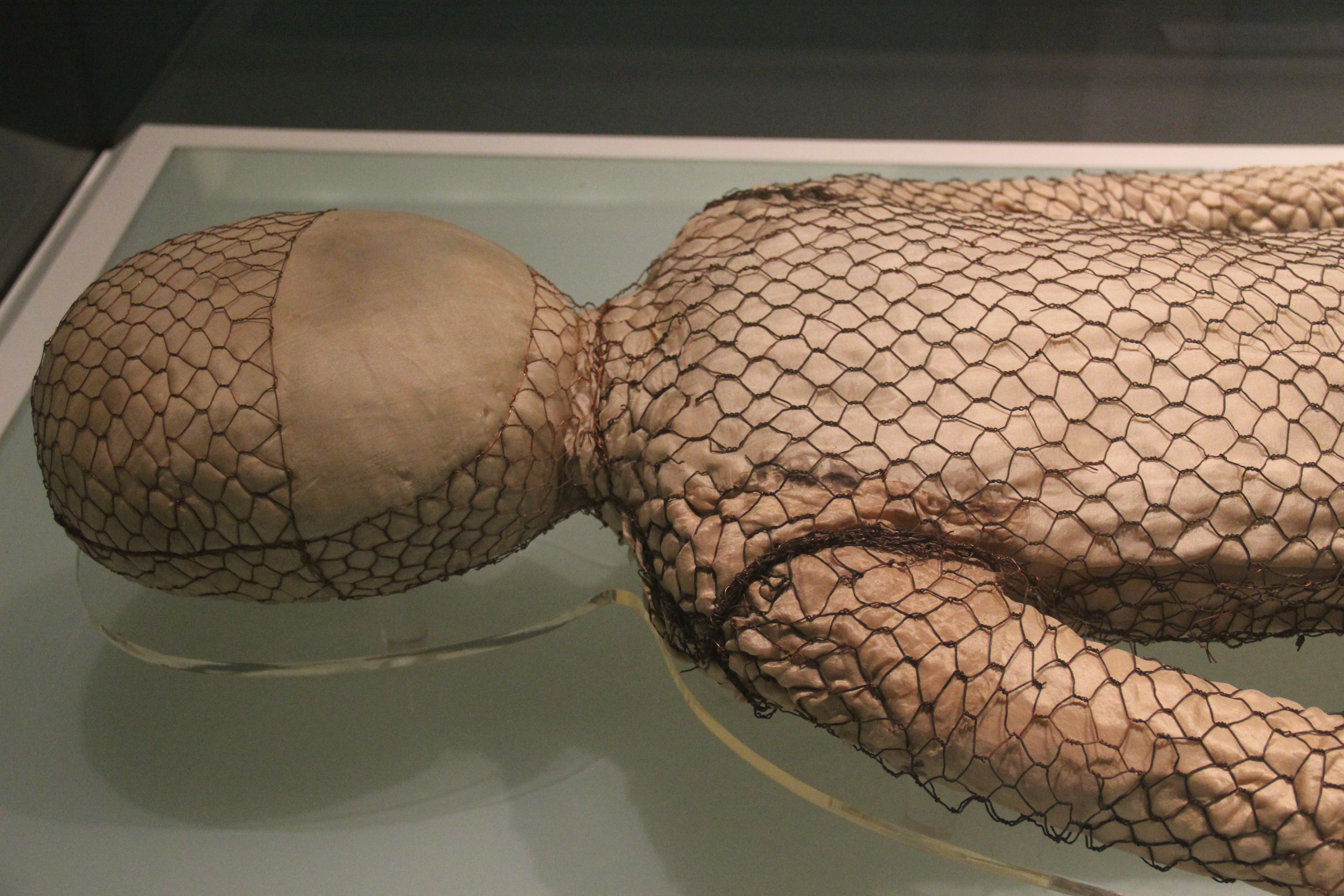
Liao tomb and sarcophagus, and burial dress made of metal wire

The Khitans buried their elite dead with metal masks and woven-wire suits. The masks were personalized to the face of the deceased and made from bronze, silver, or gold depending on their status. The Princess of Chen and her husband were found in a silver wire-suit with gold masks and a gold headdress. Sometimes earrings are depicted on the masks as well. The Khitans believed a metal mask and suit would preserve the body and prevent decay. Some remains were cremated.

The Khitans, from the 920s, adopted Tang dynasty-style tomb architecture very quickly and in increasingly elaborate forms. Liao mausoleums were based on Tang-style cultural influences, rather than the newer Song dynasty-style.

=== Cultural legacy ===
Khitan hunters in a painting by Chen Juzhong, 1196

The influence of the Liao dynasty on subsequent culture includes a large legacy of statuary art works, with important surviving examples in painted wood, metal, and three-colour glazed sancai ceramics. The music and songs of the Liao dynasty are also known to have indirectly or directly influenced Mongol, Jurchen, and Chinese musical traditions.

The rhythmic and tonal pattern of the ci (詞) form of poetry, an important part of Song dynasty poetry, uses a set of poetic meters and is based upon certain definitive musical song tunes. The specific origin of these various original tunes and musical modes is not known, but the influence of Liao dynasty lyrics both directly and indirectly through the music and lyrics of the Jurchen Jin dynasty appears likely. At least one Han Chinese source considered the Liao (and Jurchen) music to be the vigorous and powerful music of horse-mounted warriors, diffused through border warfare.

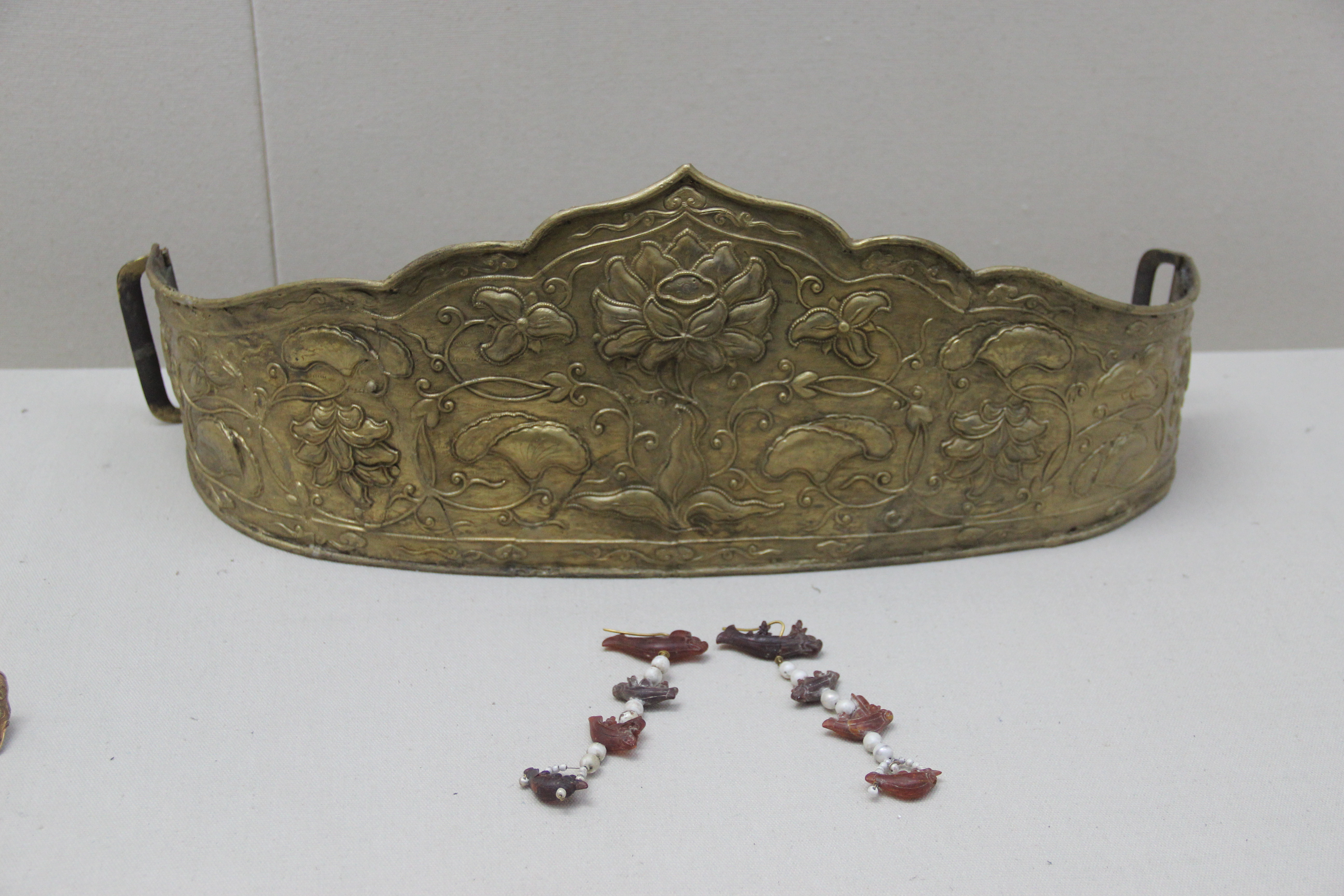
Liao gold waist ornament

Another influence of the Liao cultural tradition is seen in the Yuan dynasty's zaju (雜劇) theatre, its associated orchestration, and the qu (曲) and sanqu (散曲) forms of Classical Chinese poetry. One documented way in which this influence occurred was through the incorporation of Khitan officers and men into the service of the Mongol forces during the first Mongol invasion of 1211 to 1215.

== Historic site ==
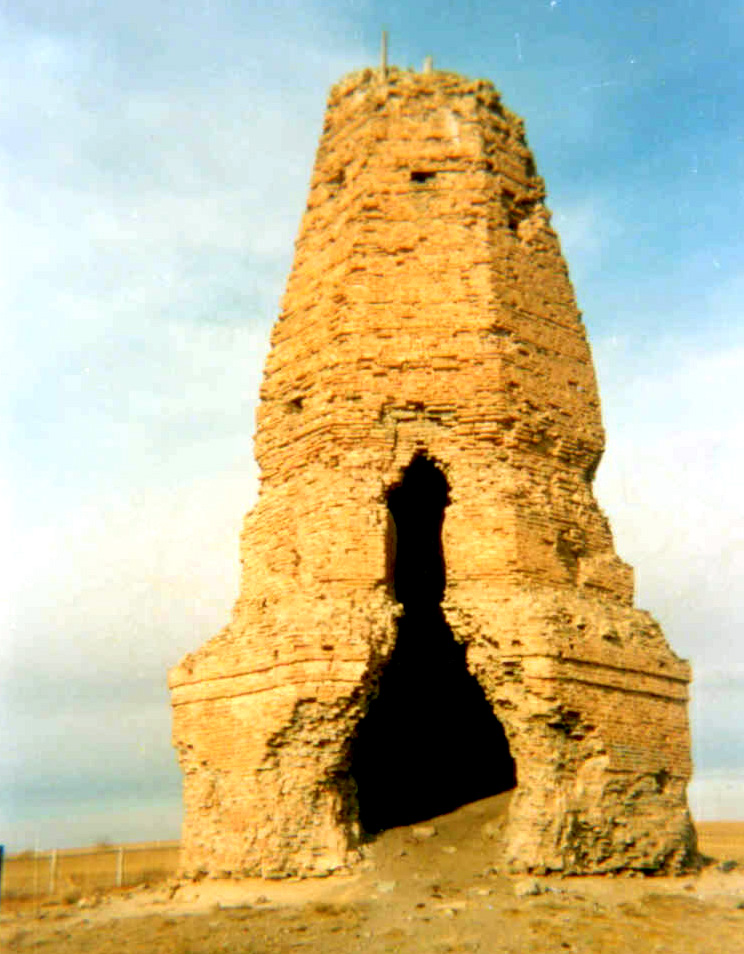
A brick stupa in the Khitan city of Hedong (Bars-Hot)

The Chinese state news agency Xinhua announced in January 2018 that the ruins in Duolun County, Inner Mongolia, of an ancient palace that served as the summer retreat for the royal family and retinue of the Liao dynasty, had been discovered. They would move each year from mid-April to mid-July to avoid the heat. The site includes foundations of 12 buildings of more than 2,500 square feet that have been recorded and artifacts, such as glazed tiles, pottery and copper nails that were used to date the site.

== See also ==
- Eastern Liao
- Emperors family tree
- Fashion in the Liao dynasty
- Later Liao
- List of emperors of the Liao dynasty
- Northern Liao
- Western Liao

| Preceded by Tang dynasty Five Dynasties | Dynasties in Chinese history 907–1125 | Succeeded by Jin dynasty Northern Liao; Western Liao |
