= All the Way with You =

2015–2016 Chinese reality TV series

- Genre: Reality television
- Starring: Kim Hee-chul
- Opening theme: "Love Motion" by With You All The Way cast member
- Country of origin: China
- Original language: Mandarin
- No. of seasons: 2
- No. of episodes: 24

Production
- Production locations: South Korea (Seoul, Gangwon Province), Europe (Spain), Laos, China (China, Beijing)

Original release
- Network: Zhejiang Television
- Release: January 10, 2015 – May 28, 2016

All the Way with You (Chinese: 一路上有你) is a Chinese reality show that aired on Zhejiang Television.

== Format ==
Three celebrity couples, live under one roof and they are given a mission to complete.

== Cast member ==
It is the first Chinese variety that Kim Heechul was in charge since his debut in Korean entertainment in 2005.

- Host
  - Kim Hee-chul

Season 1

- Couples
  - Julian Cheung & Anita Yuen
  - Tian Liang & Yiqian Ye
  - He Ziming & He Jie

Season 2

- Couples
  - Julian Cheung & Anita Yuen
  - Yi Sha & Ke Hu
  - Yuelun Wang & Li Xiang

== Rating ==
In the ratings below, the highest rating for the show will be in red, and the lowest rating for the show will be in blue each season.

Season 1

Ep. #	Broadcast date	Ratings	View share
1	January 10, 2015	0.951%	2.745
2	January 17, 2015	1.044%	3.02
3	January 24, 2015	1.119%	3.23
4	January 31, 2015	1.181%	3.45
5	February 7, 2015	1.194%	3.50
6	February 14, 2015	1.116%	3.50
7	February 21, 2015	0.871%	2.815
8	February 28, 2015	1.090%	3.15
9	March 7, 2015	0.673%	4.37
10	March 14, 2015	1.666%	4.99
11	March 21, 2015	1.586%	4.75
12	March 28, 2015	1.453%	4.78
