= Point of No Return (TV series) =

- Promo image
- 西關大少
- Genre: Period drama, Romance
- Starring: Damian Lau; Angie Chiu; Julian Cheung; Charmaine Sheh; Sammul Chan
- Opening theme: "Dreamless Loving" by Julian Cheung
- Country of origin: Hong Kong
- Original language: Cantonese
- No. of episodes: 30

Production
- Producer: Lee Tim-shing
- Running time: 45 minutes (approx.)

Original release
- Network: TVB
- Release: November 3 – December 12, 2003

Point of No Return (Traditional Chinese: 西關大少) is a 30-episode TVB drama broadcast between November 2003 and December 2003. It is a story about a family shipping business and various love triangles set in Guangzhou, China, in the 1920s. This series again saw Julian Cheung and Charmaine Sheh as an on-screen couple after their partnership in Return of the Cuckoo (2000), and as with previous occasions, their on screen chemistry was praised by audiences.

== Synopsis ==
Chow Ming Hin (Damian Lau) single-handedly builds his family shipping business into a successful enterprise despite other family members who are either corrupt or incompetent. His son Chow Tin Chi (Julian Cheung) is earmarked as his successor, he is a spoiled brat who enjoys playing pranks on others, in particular Ho Seung Hei (Charmaine Sheh). Ng Yuk Hing (Angie Chiu) is both Chow Ming Hin's right-hand-man in business and love of his life, even though he is married. Eventually he marries her as a second wife and has a child (Tin Chi's half brother) together, arousing much jealousy from his first wife Lee De Yung (Lui San).

On Chow Ming Hin's death, the firm is left in the hands of Ng Yuk Hing, Chow not trusting his son's ability to run the business. She has to fend off both Lee's increasing bitterness towards her as well as the avarice of Tin Chi's uncles. Their feuding leads to Tin Chi and Seung Hei falling in love with each other, but it does not last long due to their differences in status, a point which Tin Chi's family drive home as they conspire to force Seung Hei out.

Tin Chi is gutted by the breakup, and Yuk Hing tries her best to make him focus on taking over the shipping business to not much avail. Loh Bik Kei (Belinda Hamnett) plays his childhood friend who falls in love with him, but is unable to win his love. She is secretly happy that Seung Hei has gotten a new boyfriend, Chen Kwok Bong, but no matter how hard she tells Tin Chi to give up, he refuses to. Even when Seung Hei marries to Kwok Bong, Tin Chi's heart remains hers.

Subsequently, the shipping business runs into trouble when Ng Yuk Hing is forced to take care of her newborn child and has to leave the business to her brother and Tin Chi's uncles. Foreseeing the firm's bankruptcy, she claims her entitlement under Chow Ming Hin's will, but incurs the wrath of all. Seung Hei decides to join her husband, Kwok Bong in England, and Tin Chi is desperate to see her one last time. Bik Kei dissuades him, but in doing so, gets knocked down by a car when Tin Chi rushes across a road and she pushes him away. She is paralyzed for life and Tin Chi promises to take care of her. In the end, she manages to walk with a walking stick.

It turns out that Ng Yuk Hing had claimed her portion of the will not to escape from the family's impending misfortunes, but to have a substantial amount of money to start all over again when the firm was liquidated. With her foresight she finally earns the respect of her parents-in-law, as well as Lee De Yung.

The finale of the show revolves around the unresolved love affair between Chow Tin Chi and Ho Seung Hei. Seung Hei became widowed when her husband, Kwok Bong died with an illness while they were both in Africa helping the sick victims. Kwok Bong tells Seung Hei to find the man that she loves as he knew he was dying on his deathbed. With Tin Chi's promise to care for Bik Kei and traditional attitudes to the probity of marrying a widow, Tin Chi is hesitant to rekindle his relationship with Seung Hei. Bik Kei, realizing where Tin Chi's heart is, encourages him to try one last time and this time with his family's support. Tin Chi tries one more time to go after Seung Hei and finally they are together. Seung Hei marries to Tin Chi and soon they have a child together.

== Cast ==
=== Chow family ===
Cast	Role	Description
Chow Chung	Chow Mao 周 茂	Chow Tin-chi's grandfather
Law Lan	Mrs. Chow	Chow Tin-chi's grandmother
Samuel Kwok	Chow Cheung 周 昌	Chow Tin-chi's granduncle Chow Mao's younger brother (Semi Villain)
Lau Kong	Lam Dong 林 東	Chow Tin-chi's granduncle Mrs. Chow's younger brother (Semi Villain)
Damian Lau	Chow Ming Hin 周明軒	Chow Tin-chi's father
Rosanne Lui	Lee Tak-yung 李德蓉	Chow Tin-chi's mother (semi-villain)
Angie Chiu	Ng Yuk Hing 伍玉卿	Chow Tin-chi's stepmother
Lo Chun Shun	Chow Ming Fai 周明輝	Chow Tin-chi's uncle
Bell Liew	Chow Ming Feng 周明鳳	Chow Tin-chi's aunt
Julian Cheung	Chow Tin Chi 周天賜	
Charmaine Sheh	Ho Seung Hei 何雙喜	Chow Tin-chi's wife Chen Kwok Bong's widow Chan Kai Tong's ex-girlfriend
	Chow Tin-yan 周天恩	Chow Tin-chi's brother

=== Ho family ===
Cast	Role	Description
Siu Leung	Ho Bei 何 北	Ho Seung-hei's father
Angelina Lo	Leung Tai 梁 娣	Ho Seung-hei's mother
Wai Ka-heung	Leung Woi 梁 和	Ho Seung-hei's uncle

=== Other cast ===
Cast	Role	Description
Belinda Hamnett	Loh Bik Kei 羅碧琪	Loves Chow Tin-chi
Sammul Chan	Chen Kwok Bong 曾國邦	Ho Seung-hei's late husband
Kevin Cheng	Chan Kai Tong 陳繼棠	Ho Sheung Hei's ex-boyfriend Chow Ming-feng's boyfriend (villain)
Wong Ching	Lee Tak Sum 李德森	Lee Tak-yung's brother (villain)
Chan Hung-lit	Ng Man-shing 伍晚成	Ng Yuk-hing's brother (semi-villain)
Auguste Kwan	Ding Sau-yi 丁守義	Chow Tin-chi's friend
John Tang	Chu Him 朱 謙	Chow Tin-chi's friend
