= Stowaway (2001 film) =

2001 Hong Kong film by Clarence Fok

- Theatrical poster
- Directed by: Clarence Fok
- Written by: Lai Man-Cheuk
- Produced by: Ng Yu; Wan Yat Tao
- Starring: Julian Cheung; Athena Chu; Hu Bing
- Production companies: Martini Film Company, Ltd. Celestial Pictures
- Distributed by: Modern Audio (International), Ltd.
- Release date: 11 October 2001
- Running time: 80 minutes
- Country: Hong Kong
- Language: Cantonese
- Box office: $32,963

Stowaway (simplified Chinese: 惊天大逃亡; traditional Chinese: 驚天大逃亡), alternatively known as Snakeheads, is a 2001 Hong Kong action film based on the true story of a group of stowaways from Fuzhou illegally immigrating to the United Kingdom in 2000. In the incident, 58 illegal immigrants suffocated to death in an airtight truck of tomatoes at Dover, England on 20 June 2000.

== Synopsis ==
In June 2000, a group of Fuzhou people spend a fortune for various reasons to be smuggled to the United Kingdom. They are first sent to Quailin, before crossing the border to Vietnam. After waiting there for fake documents for flying to Moscow, they head to the Netherlands. They are unable to travel to Moscow as the people smugglers are detected. The plan is changed and all the illegal immigrants have to travel to Ukraine by car, then walk across the border to the Czech Republic through snowstorms. They are able to sneak into the Netherlands and hide in a truck to enter into the United Kingdom, but the airtight space in the truck results in the deaths of 58 people, leaving only 2 survivors.

== Cast ==
- Julian Cheung as Chow Tai-Fuk
- Athena Chu as Kam Lan
- Hu Bing as Chi-Ming
- Chang Chia-chia as Ming-Wai
- Benny Lai as Vincent
- Oscar Leung as
- Michael Chow as Yiu-Chung
- Jady Lee as Siu-Tsui
- Annie Wu as Si-Nga
- Mou Feilian as Kuen Jie
- Chan Jun Kin as Hang Jai

== Production ==
Filming locations took place in Fuzhou, Vietnam, Moscow, Ukraine, and England.
