= The Queen of News =

2023 Hong Kong television series

- Also known as: 新聞女王
- Genre: Workplace drama; Psychological drama
- Written by: Sonia Lo; Kwok Kin-lok; Oscar Fung; Chan Ka-man
- Directed by: Keung Chung-kit; Chan Hoi-pun
- Starring: Charmaine Sheh; Kenneth Ma; Selena Lee; Samantha Ko; Regina Ho; Venus Wong
- Ending theme: "Crystal Clear" by Gigi Yim
- Country of origin: Hong Kong
- Original language: Cantonese
- No. of episodes: 26

Production
- Executive producer: Chung Shu-kai
- Producer: Kwan Man-shum
- Production location: Hong Kong
- Running time: 43 minutes
- Production companies: 77 Atelier; Youku

Original release
- Network: TVB Jade; myTV Super; Youku
- Release: 20 November – 22 December 2023

Related
- The Queen of News 2

The Queen of News (Chinese: 新聞女王) is a 26-episode Hong Kong drama series produced by 77 Atelier in collaboration with the mainland Chinese streaming platform Youku, with Chung Shu-kai as executive producer. The series premiered on Youku on 17 November 2023 and on TVB Jade on 20 November 2023. It follows the staff of the fictional SNK News, focusing on veteran anchor Man Wai-sum as she navigates newsroom rivalries, ethical dilemmas, and the ambitions of younger reporters. Starring Charmaine Sheh, Kenneth Ma, Selena Lee, Samantha Ko, Regina Ho, and Venus Wong, the series received acclaim for its performances, production quality, and depiction of journalism. It was followed by a sequel, The Queen of News 2, in 2025.

== Cast ==
- Charmaine Sheh as Man Wai-sum, a senior prime-time anchor at SNK News. She leads a team informally referred to as the "Man Army."
- Kenneth Ma as Leung King-yan (George), a prime-time anchor who leads a rival team known as the "George Army."
- Selena Lee as Cheung Ka-yin (Alice), a news anchor characterized by her commitment to ethical reporting. She generally avoids factional disputes within the newsroom.
- Samantha Ko as Hui Sze-ching (Cathy), a morning news anchor and protégé of Leung King-yan.
- Regina Ho as Tsui Hiu-mei, an evening news anchor and protégé of Man Wai-sum.
- Venus Wong as Lau Yim (Carrie), a junior reporter and close colleague of Cheung Ka-yin whose commitment during a dangerous assignment reminds Man Wai-sum of her early ideals.
- James Ng as Ma Ka-ming (Penny or PM), a cameraman who frequently collaborates with Cheung Ka-yin and Lau Yim on reporting assignments.
- Matthew Ho as Poon Chi-ngow (Ivan), a subordinate of Man Wai-sum.
- Matthew Ko as Shiu Chun-lok, a lawyer and Cheung Ka-yin's boyfriend.
- Eric Tang as Yu Ying-fei, the chief director of SNK News, portrayed as maintaining his position by engaging in office politics.
- Mimi Kung as Fong Law Lai-sheung, the chairwoman of SNK News, depicted as playing a central role in newsroom power dynamics.
- Stephanie Che as Chiu Man-wah, a senior prime-time anchor and former superior of Man Wai-sum.
- Shaun Tam as Chan Tsz-kit, a former cameraman and ex-boyfriend of Man Wai-sum. He runs a car repair shop while maintaining a friendship with her.
- Niklas Lam as Wong Wai, a reporter and member of Leung King-yan's team.
- Mark Ma as Yip Kwok-tung (Slash), a ride-hailing driver who becomes acquainted with Tsui Hiu-mei.
- Hera Chan as Tong Chi-yiu, a reporter who attempts to obtain exclusive news through improper means in order to gain Man Wai-sum's favor.

== Production and themes ==
The series originated as a film concept centered on a scene in which a news anchor encounters a notorious thief and must decide whether to report the incident immediately or intervene personally—a moral dilemma later depicted in episode 8. Executive producer Chung Shu-kai assigned writer Sonia Lo to develop the concept into a full series, with the early leads initially envisioned as Sheren Tang and Bowie Lam before Charmaine Sheh was ultimately cast.

To ensure authenticity, Lo applied for a news-anchor position to study the role firsthand, while Sheh interned with TVB News and trained with professional anchors. The main newsroom set was constructed at Shaw Studios, where filming took place over approximately three months and concluded in June 2023.

The production made extensive use of CGI. The bus crash in episode 1 was filmed on location and digitally enhanced; control-room scenes were shot on a physical set with blank monitors later filled in; and exterior and aerial shots of the fictional SNK headquarters were created with CGI. Producers Chung and Kwan Man-shum, along with two directors, also made cameo appearances.

One subplot involving elder abuse in a nursing home was reportedly inspired by a 2015 case and has been noted as resembling the plot of the film In Broad Daylight. A finale scene showing five rival female anchors sharing a drink was an unscripted addition by Chung, intended not as a neat resolution but to express that professional rivalries—"fighting over a cup of water"—are insignificant compared with the vast "ocean" of life.

Bosco Wong made a cameo appearance in the final episode at Sheh's request, as the two had not previously worked together, and later reprised his role as a main character in the sequel. After the finale aired, TVB released a short spin-off clip showing the characters portrayed by Sheh and Kenneth Ma plotting to remove Wong's character from SNK News, serving as a lead-in to the sequel.

The fictional television network SNK News has appeared in other series within the shared universe, including televised news segments and characters portrayed as its reporters.

== Plot ==
The story follows veteran anchor Man Wai-sum (Charmaine Sheh), once crowned the "Queen of News" after a career-defining exclusive, as she engages in an escalating power struggle with fellow prime-time anchor Leung King-yan (Kenneth Ma) inside the competitive SNK newsroom. Their rivalry—conducted through staff poaching, exclusive scoops, political alliances, and influence over management—draws younger reporters such as Cheung Ka-yin (Selena Lee), Tsui Hiu-mei (Regina Ho), Hui Sze-ching (Samantha Ko), and newcomer Lau Yim (Venus Wong) into an environment where ambition and ethics often collide. Early exclusives, including a deadly bus accident and major charity-fraud revelations, deepen the divide between Wai-sum's camp and King-yan's, while corruption, personal betrayals, and sensationalist reporting challenge the characters' morals and loyalty.

As shifting alliances alter the newsroom dynamics, Wai-sum returns from a temporary retreat to regain influence, while Ka-yin gradually emerges as a significant "third force." Wai-sum, now holding the title of assistant chief director, attempts to implement reforms to prevent the prime-time slot from becoming an arena of conflict but encounters resistance from both the chief director and the chairman, while King-yan aligns himself with management to undermine her. Meanwhile, pressure and rivalry lead several colleagues toward negative outcomes, resulting in scandals, mental-health issues, and strained relationships. In the final arc, long-buried errors from Wai-sum's celebrated "Thief King" case resurface, threatening her legacy. Wai-sum publicly admits her regrets and resigns, concluding her tenure. A subsequent hostage crisis at a children's charity escalates tensions, culminating in a violent confrontation during a live broadcast that leaves the newsroom profoundly transformed.

In this industry, who isn't competing? Competing for exclusives, headlines, screen time, and people!
Do I have to spell everything out for you before you know how to do your job? The company can do without you!
There's so much to watch online now—why should people still watch us? That's why we need multiple perspectives, professional analysis, fresh content, and things the audience has never seen before.

— Quotes from Man Wai-sum demonstrating her authority within the newsroom.

== Music ==
Track Listing
No.	Title	Lyrics	Music	Artist(s)	Length
1.	"Crystal Clear"	Quinn Lui	Kong Fai	Gigi Yim	3:40
2.	"Peaceful Moonlight"	Kong Fai	Kong Fai	Quinn Lui	3:17
3.	"透徹" (Mandarin version of "Crystal Clear")	Quinn Lui	Kong Fai	Gigi Yim	3:39

== Ratings and reception ==
The series received significant attention in mainland China and Hong Kong. In mainland China, it generated extensive online discussion and became one of Youku's most searched and most-watched Hong Kong dramas of 2023. Charmaine Sheh's performance was widely praised, and CCTV highlighted the series' realistic workplace depiction, character exploration, and contemporary relevance. The show's newsroom scenarios have also been incorporated into a university course's teaching materials. It achieved a peak rating of 8.2 out of 10 on Douban and ranked seventh on the 2023 China Top Ten Most Influential TV Dramas list in the China Film and Television Blue Book, as selected through voting by 52 experts and public participants.

In Hong Kong, the series was praised for its pacing, production values, and cast performances, although some critics and media professionals considered its depiction of newsroom operations unrealistic. A writer from Initium Media argued that the female leads' portrayals offered only superficial empowerment, emphasizing escapist entertainment over substantive feminist themes. Its focus on news work drew commentary from current and former anchors, who expressed differing views on its accuracy. The drama's power-struggle elements were compared to palace-themed series, and certain character portrayals and styling choices received mixed reactions. The finale attracted 1.62 million viewers, with the series ranking third among TVB dramas that year. It also topped Google TV Program Trending List for the year.

Week	Episodes	Airing dates	Ratings (Note: According to Hong Kong's TV rating system, each rating point represents approximately 64,670 viewers.)		Ref.
Week	Episodes	Airing dates	Cross-platform peak ratings	Viewership	Ref.
1	1 – 5	20–25 November 2023	24.4 points	1.57 million	
2	6 – 10	27 November–1 December 2023	25.1 points	1.62 million	
3	11 – 15	4–8 December 2023	24.7 points	1.59 million	
4	16 – 20	11–15 December 2023	25.1 points	1.62 million	
5	21 – 26	18–22 December 2023	25.2 points	1.62 million	

== Release ==
The series premiered on Youku on 17 November 2023, and on TVB Jade and myTV Super on 20 November 2023; it later aired on TVBS in Taiwan from 2 March 2024, and on Mediacorp Channel 8 in Singapore from 27 May 2024.

== Awards and nominations ==
The Queen of News received multiple awards across 2023–2024, including several honors for Best/Outstanding Drama, as well as recognitions for its screenwriting, direction, and performances. Cast members such as Charmaine Sheh and Samantha Ko earned various acting awards at different ceremonies. The series also received audience-voted recognition, including My Favorite Television Series (Greater Bay Area) at the TVB Anniversary Awards and wins at the 8th Audience's Favorite TV Awards. Overall, the production was acknowledged by numerous award bodies in a range of categories.

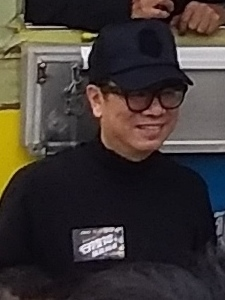
Chung Shu-kai, executive producer

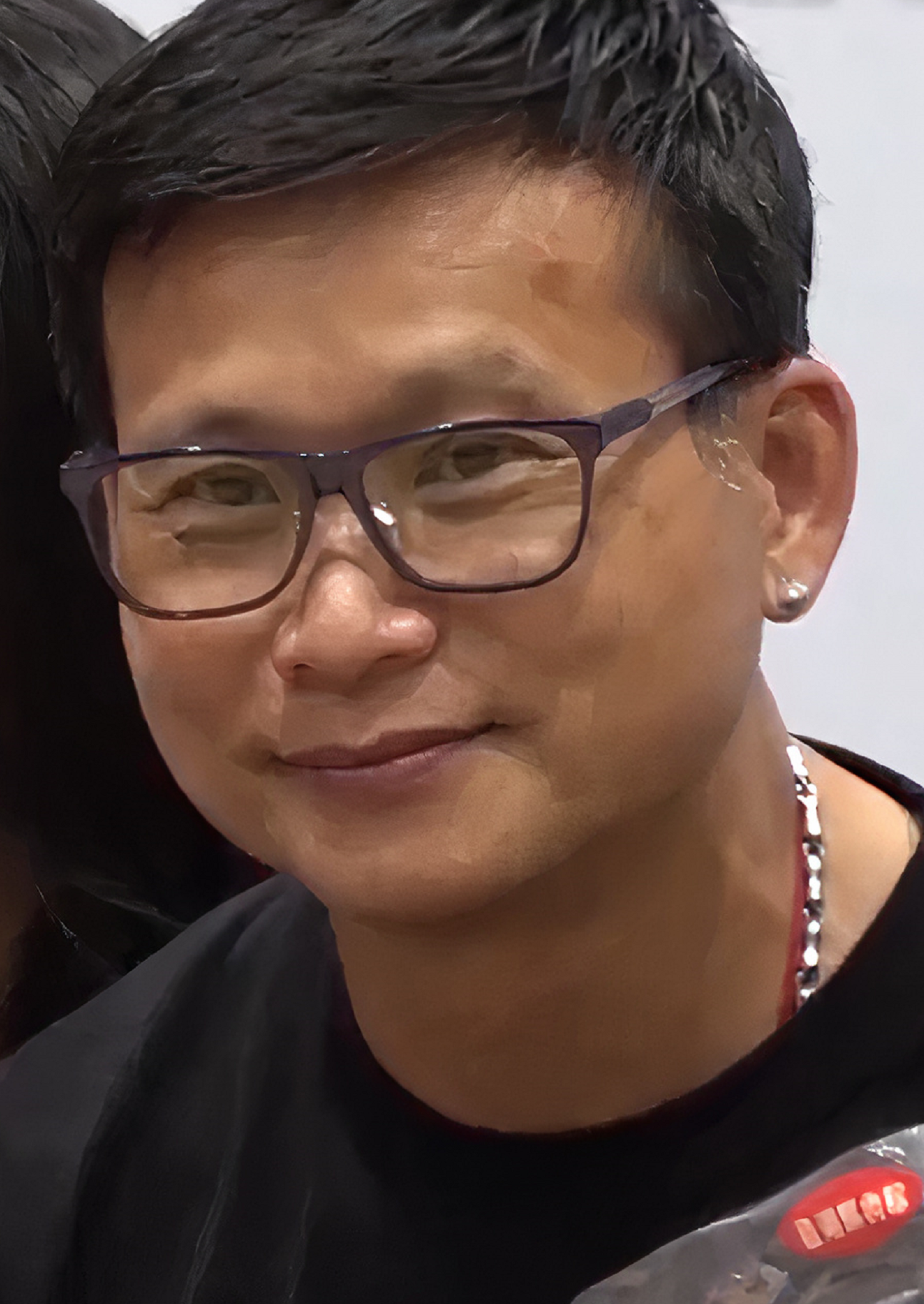
Kwan Man-shum, producer

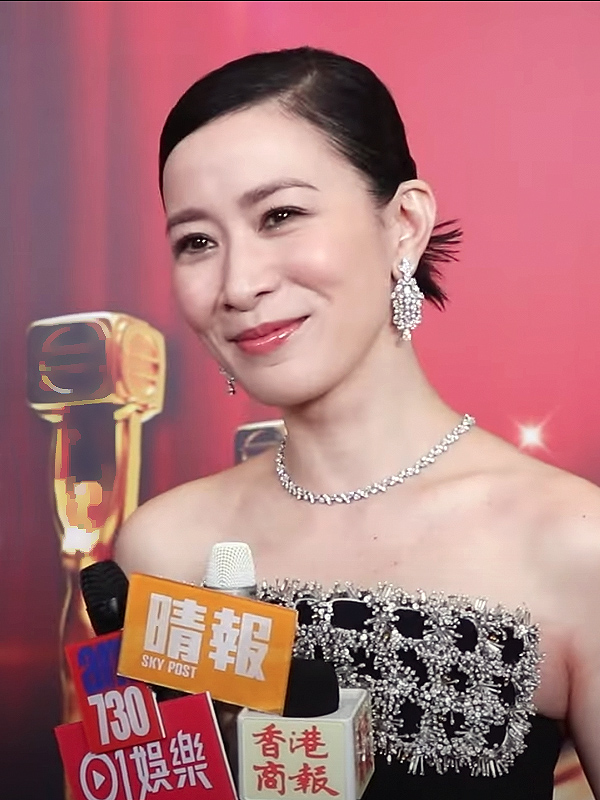
Lead actress, Charmaine Sheh, earned wide acclaim for her role and won multiple awards

Year	Award	Category	Nominated work	Results	Ref.
2023	Datawin Prosperity Bull Award	Outstanding Contribution to the Field Prosperity Award	The Queen of News	Won	
2024	Golden Dolphin Honors Selection	Drama of the Year	The Queen of News	Won	
2024	Golden Dolphin Honors Selection	Case of the Year: Entertainment Marketing Drama Series	The Queen of News	Won	
2024	2023 Weibo Awards	Weibo Annual Drama	The Queen of News	Won	
2024	2023 Weibo Awards	Weibo Annual Dedicated Actor	Charmaine Sheh	Won	
2024	56th TVB Anniversary Awards	Best Television Series	The Queen of News	Won	
2024	56th TVB Anniversary Awards	Best Actor	Kenneth Ma	Nominated	
2024	56th TVB Anniversary Awards	Best Actress	Charmaine Sheh	Won	
2024	56th TVB Anniversary Awards	Best Actress	Selena Lee	Nominated	
2024	56th TVB Anniversary Awards	Best Supporting Actor	Eric Tang	Nominated	
2024	56th TVB Anniversary Awards	Best Supporting Actress	Samantha Ko	Won	
2024	56th TVB Anniversary Awards	Best Supporting Actress	Regina Ho	Nominated	
2024	56th TVB Anniversary Awards	Best Supporting Actress	Venus Wong	Nominated	
2024	56th TVB Anniversary Awards	My Favorite Television Series (Greater Bay Area)	The Queen of News	Won	
2024	56th TVB Anniversary Awards	My Favorite Actor in a Leading Role (Greater Bay Area)	Kenneth Ma	Nominated	
2024	56th TVB Anniversary Awards	My Favorite Actress in a Leading Role (Greater Bay Area)	Charmaine Sheh	Won	
2024	56th TVB Anniversary Awards	My Favorite Actress in a Leading Role (Greater Bay Area)	Selena Lee	Nominated	
2024	56th TVB Anniversary Awards	My Favorite Television Series (Malaysia)	The Queen of News	Nominated	
2024	56th TVB Anniversary Awards	My Favorite Actor in a Leading Role (Malaysia)	Kenneth Ma	Won	
2024	56th TVB Anniversary Awards	My Favorite Actress in a Leading Role (Malaysia)	Charmaine Sheh	Won	
2024	56th TVB Anniversary Awards	My Favorite Actress in a Leading Role (Malaysia)	Selena Lee	Nominated	
2024	56th TVB Anniversary Awards	Best Television Theme song	"Crystal Clear"	Won	
2024	Beijing News Annual Television Ranking Award	Popular Actress in a Television Drama	Charmaine Sheh	Won	
2024	Golden Brown Awards 2023	Golden Brown Awards	Charmaine Sheh	Won	
2024	8th Audience's Favorite TV Awards	Best Actress	Charmaine Sheh	Won	
2024	8th Audience's Favorite TV Awards	Best Supporting Actress	Samantha Ko	Won	
2024	Capital TV Program Spring Promotion Conference	Outstanding Drama of the Year	The Queen of News	Won	
2024	New York Festivals TV & Film Awards	Screenplay (Gold Award)	The Queen of News	Won	
2024	4th iQIYI Golden Screenwriters' Night	Best Original Screenplay for Long Series	The Queen of News	Won	
2024	ContentAsia Awards	Best Actress (Gold Award)	Charmaine Sheh	Won	
2024	ContentAsia Awards	Best Supporting Actress (Gold Award)	Samantha Ko	Won	
2024	ContentAsia Awards	Best Television Theme song	"Crystal Clear"	Nominated	
2024	Weibo TV and Internet Video Summit	Popular Works of the Year	The Queen of News	Won	
2024	Weibo TV and Internet Video Summit	Outstanding Actress of the Year	Charmaine Sheh	Won	
2024	29th Asian Television Awards	Best Actress	Charmaine Sheh	Won	
2024	29th Asian Television Awards	Best Actress	Selena Lee	Nominated	
2024	29th Asian Television Awards	Best Supporting Actress	Samantha Ko	Nominated	
2024	40th Huading Awards	Global Best Series	The Queen of News	Won	
2024	40th Huading Awards	Global Best Director	Chung Shu-kai, Kwan Man-shum	Won	
2024	40th Huading Awards	Global Best Screenwriter	Kwok Kin-lok, Oscar Fung, Chan Ka-man	Won	
2024	40th Huading Awards	Global Best Television Actress	Charmaine Sheh	Won	
2024	15th Macau International TV Festival Golden Lotus Awards	Best Television Series	The Queen of News	Nominated	
2024	15th Macau International TV Festival Golden Lotus Awards	Best Director	Chung Shu-kai, Kwan Man-shum	Won	
2024	15th Macau International TV Festival Golden Lotus Awards	Best Screenwriter	Kwok Kin-lok, Oscar Fung, Chan Ka-man	Nominated	
2024	15th Macau International TV Festival Golden Lotus Awards	Best Actress	Charmaine Sheh	Nominated	
2024	15th Macau International TV Festival Golden Lotus Awards	Best Supporting Actress	Samantha Ko	Won	
2024	15th Macau International TV Festival Golden Lotus Awards	Best Cinematography	Kenny Lam, Alpheus Woo	Won	
2025	2nd Golden Panda Awards (TV Drama Category)	Best Actress	Charmaine Sheh	Nominated	
