= When Easterly Showers Fall on the Sunny West =

Hong Kong television series

- Official poster
- 東山飄雨西關晴
- Genre: Period Drama
- Starring: Joe Ma; Charmaine Sheh; Liza Wang; Raymond Wong; Mak Cheung-ching; Kiki Sheung; Edwin Siu; Mandy Wong; Kwok Fung; Selena Li
- Opening theme: <愛在天邊> by Liza Wang
- Ending theme: <陪你哭也只得我> by Joe Ma and Charmaine Sheh
- Country of origin: Hong Kong
- Original language: Cantonese
- No. of episodes: 30

Production
- Producer: Kwan Wing Chung
- Production locations: Hong Kong, Chūzan, Kaiping
- Running time: 45 minutes (approx.)

Original release
- Network: TVB
- Release: October 27 – December 6, 2008

When Easterly Showers Fall on the Sunny West
- Traditional Chinese: 東山飄雨西關晴
- Simplified Chinese: 东山飘雨西关晴
Transcriptions
Standard Mandarin
- Hanyu Pinyin: Dōngshān piāoyǔ xīguān qíng
Yue: Cantonese
- Jyutping: Tung san piu yue sai kwan ching

When Easterly Showers Fall on the Sunny West (Traditional Chinese: 東山飄雨西關晴) is a Hong Kong TVB period drama series broadcasting from October till December 2008, starring Joe Ma and Charmaine Sheh as the main leads. The story takes place in the early 1930s in the city of Guangzhou (China) and revolves around the rich and prestigious Poon family.

== Synopsis ==
Chong Fung Yi (Liza Wang) abandoned her eldest son immediately after he was born because she didn't want to be labeled as the woman who gave birth before she was even married. However, her son Muk Hing (Joe Ma) manages to find his way back to her. Due to reputation purposes, she doesn't tell anybody about his true identity. Her younger son Cheuk Wah (Raymond Wong) falls in love with Yip Heung Ching (Charmaine Sheh), but because their different status' and Fung Yi's objection, they cannot be together. However, soon enough, Heung Ching and Muk Hing find themselves more than just friends... what obstacles will await them this time?

== Main cast ==
Cast	Role	Description
Joe Ma	Poon Cheuk Hing/Muk Hing 潘卓興/穆興	Yip Heung Ching's lover Chong Fung Yi and Poon Siu Tong's son Poon Cheuk Wah's brother
Charmaine Sheh	Yip Heung Ching 葉向晴	Poon Cheuk Hing's lover

== Recurring cast ==
Cast	Role	Description
Liza Wang	Chong Fung Yi 莊鳳儀	Poon Siu Tong's wife Poon Cheuk Hing and Poon Cheuk Wah's mother
Raymond Wong	Poon Cheuk Wah 潘卓華	Chong Fung Yi and Poon Siu Tong's son Fong Bo Kei's ex-husband Poon Cheuk Hing's brother Yip Heung Ching's ex-boyfriend
Mak Cheung-ching	Yip Heung Yeung 葉向陽	Yip Heung Ching's brother
Kiki Sheung	Chong Fung Tak 莊鳳德	Tsui Yiu-Chung's wife Chong Fung Yi's sister
Edwin Siu	Kwan Ho Cheung 關浩長	Fong Bo Kei's lover
Mandy Wong	Chong Shuk Woon 莊婌媛	Chong Fung Tak and Tsui Yiu Chung's daughter

== Other cast ==
Cast	Role	Description
Cheung Kwok Keung (張國強)	Tsui Yiu Chung 徐耀宗	Chong Fung Tak's husband
Kwok Fung (郭峰)	Poon Siu Tong 潘兆棠	Chong Fung Yi's husband Fan Cheuk Hing and Poon Cheuk Wah's father
Selena Li	Fong Bo Kei 方寶琦	Poon Cheuk Wah's ex-wife Kwan Ho Cheung's lover
Savio Tsang (曾偉權)	Leung Yim Biu 梁焱驫	Poon Family's enemy
Sharon Luk	Chiu Hiu Mei 趙曉薇	Yip Heung Yeung's ex-lover Fong Jing Gong's wife
Angel Chiang	何瑞金（少年）	Shown in Ep.01 flashback of Chong Fung Yi's primary maid
Chloe Yuen (阮兒)	妓 女	Prostitute in Ep.20

== Viewership ratings ==
	Week	Episode	Average Points	Peaking Points	References
1	October 27–31, 2008	1 — 5	26	30	
2	November 3–7, 2008	6 — 10	27	—	
3	November 10–14, 2008	11 — 15	28	—	
4	November 17–21, 2008	16 — 19	28	31	
5	November 24–28, 2008	20 — 24	28	—	
6	December 1–5, 2008	25 — 30	29	36	
