= Maidens' Vow =

- Poster
- 鳳凰四重奏
- Genre: Drama
- Starring: Charmaine Sheh; Joe Ma
- Opening theme: "蝶變" by Charmaine Sheh
- Ending theme: "禁戀" by Charmaine Sheh
- Country of origin: Hong Kong
- Original language: Cantonese
- No. of episodes: 30

Production
- Running time: 45 minutes (approx.)
- Production company: TVB

Original release
- Network: TVB Jade
- Release: August 28 – October 6, 2006

Maidens' Vow (Traditional Chinese: 鳳凰四重奏) is a TVB drama series broadcast in August 2006. It won acclaim for its unique format of depicting four different generations of the same lineage, depicting distinctly different cultural and historical settings: the patriarchal late Qing dynasty, the Chinese revolutionary era, the 1970s Hong Kong, and the modern day 2000s Hong Kong.

== Synopsis ==
The drama centers around a restaurant owned by four generations of women.

=== First generation ===
1880 - 1905: Ngai Yu-Fung (Charmaine Sheh), who was married to a good-for-nothing husband Wang Yuk-Lun (Sammul Chan). Lun gambled away their family's assets and cheated on his wife numerous times. Lun also was always suspicious about the relationship about Yu-Fung and Yu-Chi, even though they were always telling the truth, but of course, the good-for-nothing never believed it. However, Fung remained faithful to her husband, despite her and Yu-Chi (Joe Ma)'s enduring love. Fung eventually became pregnant and had a daughter with Lun. The first story ends tragically, with Fung dying with her longtime lover Chi in a train accident.

=== Second generation ===
1919 - 1925: Fung and Lun's daughter Wang Chi-Kwun (Charmaine Sheh). She fell in love with her teacher, Li Kat-Cheung (Joe Ma), and they eventually eloped to Tianjin. Though they were very poor, they were still happy because they could be together. Her husband, who had studied to become a doctor, had to work in coal mines to support the family. The owner of the coal mines didn't care about the safety of the workers at all, and the death of a good friend spurred her husband to support the Revolution. Chi-Kwun was separated from her husband and eventually returned to her home to help run the family restaurant. After two years with no news from her husband, he suddenly resurfaced, working for the Japanese. However, it turned out he was actually a double agent, and still fighting for the Revolution. He was found out and they fled for their lives, spending an unforgettable last night on the train together, before they had to part ways again. Chi-Kwun became pregnant with their child, and continued to run the family restaurant. She waited for him for the rest of her life, and died of old age.

=== Third generation ===
1967 - 1982: Bak Wai-Jan (Charmaine Sheh), the grand daughter of Kwun. Jan married Dai Lap-Yan (Joe Ma), who was firmly convinced that women should stay at home while the men worked to support the family. Wai-Jan became bored with staying at home all the time and decided to work in an advertising company without letting Lap-Yan know. However, he eventually found out, and their relationship went through a lot of turbulence. In the end, Wai-Jan made Lap-Yan switch roles with her to teach him a lesson, and showed him how hard it was to have to work and keep up with chores at home. Lap-yan learned his lesson and had a daughter with Wai-Jan. They immigrated to the United States in search of a better life, but unfortunately Wai-Jan and Lap-Yan both died in an earthquake in San Francisco.

=== Fourth generation ===
2003 - 2006: Dai Sze-Ka (Charmaine Sheh), Wai-Jan and Lap-Yan's daughter. She is hard-working and independent, and believes that only fools get married. Though she has had many boyfriends, one thing remains in common with all of them - they always go missing before New Year's and then break up with her soon after. Meanwhile, Fong Ka-On (Joe Ma), a successful accountant, is stood up at the altar by his fiancée. The two of them spend New Year's Eve together and had a one-night stand. However, they fell in love and eventually moved in together, but due to their differences and several misunderstandings, broke up again. Sze-Ka eventually gave birth to a baby boy, but did not have a chance to tell Ka-On during her pregnancy, and decided to raise the child herself with the help of her friend Sheung Yat-Kat (Sammul Chan). Sze-Ka reopens the restaurant that her great-great-grandmother opened and became famous due to her cooking books and Ka-On tries to marry her again...

== Cast ==
=== First generation ===
Cast	Role	Description
Charmaine Sheh	Ngai Yu-Fung 魏瑜鳳	Yu Chi's friend. Wang Yuk-Lun's wife. Wang Chi-Kwun's mother.
Joe Ma	Yu Chi 余賜	Chef; Ngai Yu-Fung's friend.
Sammul Chan	Wang Yuk-Lun 汪毓麟	Ngai Yu-Fung's husband. Wang Chi-Kwun's father.
Wu Fung	Wang Sin-Kei 汪善琦	Tung Dai-Hei's husband. Wang Yuk-Lun's father.
Kiki Sheung	Tung Dai-Hei 董帶喜	Wang Sin-Kei's wife. Wang Yuk-Lun's mother.

=== Second generation ===
Cast	Role	Description
Charmaine Sheh	Wang Chi-Kwun 汪子君	Student; Ngai Yu-Fung and Wang Yuk-Lun's daughter. Li Kat-Cheung's wife. Bak Wai-Jan's grandmother.
Joe Ma	Li Kat-Cheung 李吉祥	Teacher; Wang Chi-Kwun's husband. Bak Wai-Jan's grandfather.
Kiki Sheung	Tung Dai-Hei 董帶喜	Wang Chi-Kwun's grandmother.
Irene Wong (汪琳)	Yung Dak-Sin 容德善	Wang Chi-Kwun's servant.
Eric Li	Dan Lai-Jak 范禮澤	Doctor
Elaine Yiu	Cheung Lei 張莉	Wang Chi-Kwun's friend.

=== Third generation ===
Cast	Role	Description
Charmaine Sheh	Bak Wai-Jan 白慧珍	Housewife; Wang Chi-Kwun and Li Kat-Cheung's grand daughter. Dai Lap-Yan's wife. Dai Sze-Ka's mother.
Joe Ma	Dai Lap-Yan 戴立仁	Salesman; Bak Wai-Jan's husband. Dai Sze-Ka's father.
Joel Chan	Bat Ha-Kau (Henry) 畢夏裘	

=== Fourth generation ===
Cast	Role	Description
Charmaine Sheh	Dai Sze-Ka 戴思嘉	Beer Girl/Restaurant Owner; Bak Wai-Jan and Dai Lap-Yan's daughter. Fong Ka-On's lover.
Joe Ma	Fong Ka-On (K.O.) 方家安	Accountant; Dai Sze-Ka's lover.
Sammul Chan	Sheung Yat-Kat 尚一吉	Dai Sze-Ka's friend.
Sherming Yiu (姚樂怡)	Siu Yuk-Jing 蕭玉貞	Dai Sze-Ka's friend.
Ken Wong (王凱韋)	Tang Pang 鄧鵬	Bartender; Fong Ka-On's friend.

== Viewership ratings ==
	Week	Episode	Average Points	Peaking Points	References
1	August 28 - September 1, 2006	1 — 5	32	35	
2	September 4–8, 2006	6 — 10	34	37	
3	September 11–15, 2006	11 — 15	34	37	
4	September 18–22, 2006	16 — 20	32	35	
5	September 25–29, 2006	21 — 25	30	—	
6	October 2–6, 2006	26 — 30	29	—	

== Accolades ==
Year	Ceremony	Category	Recipients and nominees	Result
2006	TVB Anniversary Awards	Best Actress	Charmaine Sheh	Won
2006	TVB Anniversary Awards	Most Popular Female Character	Charmaine Sheh	Won
2006	TVB Anniversary Awards	Best Drama		Nominated
2006	TVB Anniversary Awards	Best Actor	Joe Ma	Nominated
2006	TVB Anniversary Awards	Most Popular Male Character	Joe Ma	Nominated
2006	TVB Anniversary Awards	Best Supporting Actor	Sammul Chan	Nominated
2006	TVB Anniversary Awards	Best Supporting Actress	Kiki Sheung	Nominated
2006	TVB Anniversary Awards	Most Improved Male Artiste	Sammul Chan	Nominated
2006	TVB Anniversary Awards	Best Promotional Clip		Nominated
2006	Annual Artiste Award 2006	Best TV Actress Award – Gold	Charmaine Sheh	Won
2006	Annual Artiste Award 2006	Best Newcomer Singer Award – Bronze	Charmaine Sheh	Won
2006	China TV Drama Award	Most Popular TV Drama Actress for Hong Kong Region	Charmaine Sheh	Won
2007	Next Magazine Awards	Top 10 Television Programmes (#6)		Won
2007	Next Magazine Awards	Top 10 Television Artistes (#1)	Charmaine Sheh	Won
2008	Astro Wah Lai Toi Drama Awards	My Favourite TVB Actor	Joe Ma	Nominated
2008	Astro Wah Lai Toi Drama Awards	My Favourite TVB Drama Characters	Joe Ma	Won
2008	Annual Golden TVS Award	Most Popular HK-Taiwan TV Actress	Charmaine Sheh	Won
