= Charmaine Sheh =

Hong Kong actress

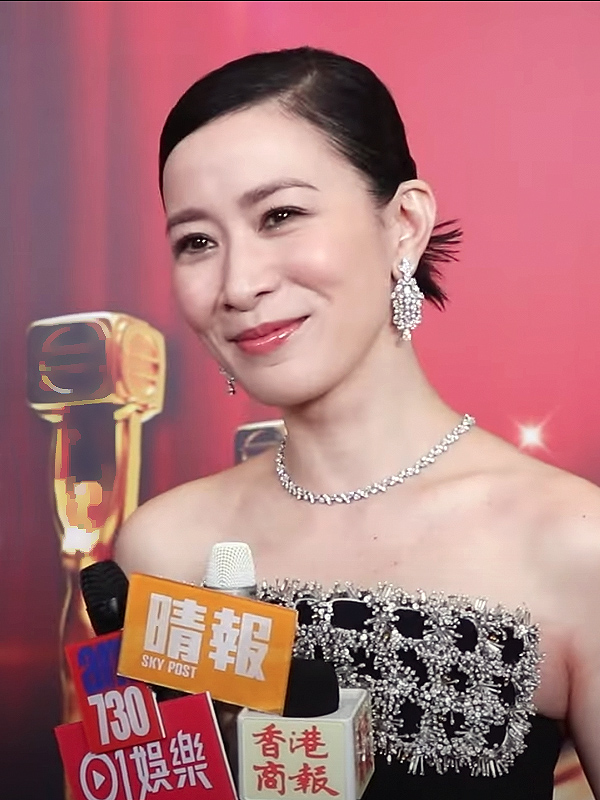
- Sheh in January 2024
- Born: 28 May 1975 (age 51); British Hong Kong
- Occupations: Actress; singer
- Years active: 1997–present

Chinese name
- Traditional Chinese: 佘詩曼
- Simplified Chinese: 佘诗曼
- Hanyu Pinyin: Shé Shīmàn
- Jyutping: Se4 Si1-maan6

Charmaine Sheh Sze-man (Chinese: 佘詩曼; born 28 May 1975) is a Hong Kong actress and beauty pageant titleholder who placed second runner-up at Miss Hong Kong pageant 1997 and represented her country at Miss International 1997. Sheh signed a contract with TVB in 1998. She is best known for her roles in Return of the Cuckoo (2000), War and Beauty (2004), Maidens' Vow (2006), Forensic Heroes II (2008), Beyond the Realm of Conscience (2009), Can't Buy Me Love (2010), When Heaven Burns (2011), Line Walker (2014), Story of Yanxi Palace (2018) and The Queen of News (2023).

== Career ==
Sheh graduated in 1994 from the International Hotel Management Institute Switzerland in Lucerne, Switzerland, with a diploma in hotel management. In October 1997, she signed with Hong Kong television network TVB after emerging as second runner-up in the 1997 Miss Hong Kong Pageant. The early stage of her career was often characterised by her coy, squeaky voice and criticisms of her acting skills. However, Sheh overcame these shortcomings and made her breakthrough in Return of the Cuckoo in 2000, co-starring with Nancy Sit, Julian Cheung and Steven Ma.

In 2006, Sheh became the first TVB actress to win two major awards at the same TVB Anniversary Awards ceremony, clinching the Best Actress Award and My Favourite Female TV Character for her performance in Maidens' Vow.

Sheh also became the first to win the Best Actress award four times, in 2006, 2014, 2023, and 2025.

Sheh also won the Top Four Actresses Award with Ruby Lin, Zhao Wei and Liu Yifei. Sheh was the first Hong Kong television actress to be shortlisted for the semi-finals of the Best Actress category at the 35th International Emmy Awards in 2007. In 2011 she was awarded Best Actress at the Asian Television Awards for her performance in Can't Buy Me Love.

After 14 years, Sheh left TVB to develop her acting career in China and returned in 2014 for a two-year contract with TVBC, a joint venture between TVB and China Media Capital (CMC) and Shanghai Media Group (SMG).

Sheh returned to the small screen in 2014, playing the undercover cop Ting Siu Ka (丁小嘉) in Line Walker, earning critical acclaim. Her on-screen partnership with Raymond Lam was also favoured by viewers. She received eleven awards with her role in Line Walker, including Best Actress and Favourite TV Character at TVB 48th Anniversary Awards, TVB Star Awards Malaysia 2014 and Singapore StarHub TVB Awards 2014, which broke the record of receiving the most awards with a single role in TVB.

In 2018, Sheh was highly praise for her profound portrayal of Hoifa-Nara Shushen (嫻妃) in the Chinese period drama Story of Yanxi Palace. For this role, she was nominated for Best Supporting Actress at the 24th Huading Awards and garnered international fame.

She gained some controversy in 2019 when she was seen liking a post on Instagram related to the support of the 2019 Hong Kong protests. This garnered extreme backlash from Chinese citizens calling for her to be banned from the Chinese entertainment industry but she was quick to retract the like and publicly stated that she did not know the context of the photo thinking it was just a nice photograph taken by a known photographer and was extremely shocked when she found out. The statement in turn angered some Hong Kong citizens.

In 2020, Sheh starred in Winter Begonia as the wife of Cheng Fengtai. She portrayed Xiao Hunian in the 2020 drama series The Legend of Xiao Chuo.

In 2023, Sheh portrayed the ambitious and scheming anchorwoman Man Wai-sum (文慧心) in The Queen of News, again earning critical acclaim. She won the TVB Anniversary Award for Best Actress, Malaysia’s Favourite Actress and Greater Bay Area’s Favourite Actress.

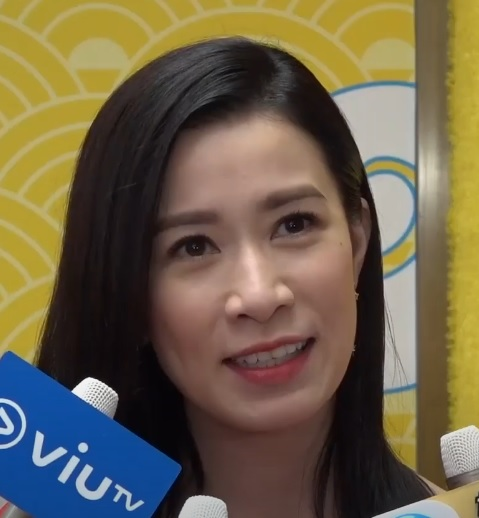
Sheh in January 2019

== Filmography ==
=== Television series ===
Year	Title	Role	Notes/Ref.
1998	Time Off	Mak Yun-Yee	
1999	Flying Fox of Snowy Mountain	Miu Yeuk-lan	
1999	Detective Investigation Files IV	Man Yuen-lan	
2000	Crimson Sabre	Ah-kau / Princess Cheung-ping	
2000	The Heaven Sword and Dragon Sabre	Chow Chi-yeuk	
2000	Return of the Cuckoo	Chuk Kwan-ho	TVB Anniversary Award for My Favourite Television Character; TVB Anniversary Award for My Favourite On-Screen Partners (Dramas)
2001	Country Spirit	Lai Sun-fung	TVB Anniversary Award for My Favourite Television Character; Nominated – TVB Anniversary Award for Best Actress (Top 5)
2001	Seven Sisters	Wong Yuk-jam	
2002	A Herbalist Affair	Ruby Ng Sin-yu	Nominated – TVB Anniversary Award for Best Actress; Nominated – TVB Anniversary Award for My Favourite Television Character
2002	Love is Beautiful		
2002	The White Flame	Charlie Yuk Choi-ling	
2002	Witness to a Prosecution II	Yuen Yuk-chu	
2003	Perish in the Name of Love	Princess Cheung-ping	TVB Anniversary Award for My Favourite Television Character; Nominated – TVB Anniversary Award for Best Actress (Top 5)
2003	Point of No Return	Ho Seung-hei	
2003	Life Begins at Forty	Kelly Kwan Tze-kei	Nominated – TVB Anniversary Award for Best Actress
2003	Carry Me Fly and Walk Off	Qin Fang	
2003	The Voyage of Emperor Qian Long to Jiangnan	Empress / Zixia	
2004	Love Stories in Regalia Bay	Guest star	
2004	Fantasy Trend	Charmaine Sheh	Guest star
2004	Angels of Mission	Yiu Lai-fa	Nominated – TVB Anniversary Award for Best Actress
2004	War and Beauty	Tung-ka Yee-sun	TVB Anniversary Award for Best Drama; TVB Anniversary Award for My Favourite Television Character; Nominated – TVB Anniversary Award for Best Actress (Top 5); Nominated – TVB Anniversary Award for My Favourite On-Screen Partners (Dramas)
2005	Yummy Yummy – Food For Life	Mandy Chow Man-hei	Nominated – TVB Anniversary Award for Best Actress (Top 10)
2005	Always Ready	Carrie Hong Yau-nam	
2005	Strike at Heart	Siu Keng	
2006	Lethal Weapons of Love and Passion	Chun Mung-yiu	
2006	The Dance of Passion	Ka Chun-fen	Nominated – TVB Anniversary Award for Best Actress (Top 20); Nominated – TVB Anniversary Award for My Favourite Female Character (Top 20)
2006	Maidens' Vow	Ngai Yu-fung / Wong Tze-kwan / Jenny Bak Wai-jan / Dai Sze-ka	TVB Anniversary Award for Best Actress; TVB Anniversary Award for My Favourite Female Character
2006	Glittering Days	Chu Yuk-lan (Fan Lan)	Nominated – TVB Anniversary Award for Best Actress (Top 5); Nominated – TVB Anniversary Award for My Favourite Female Character (Top 5)
2007	The Drive of Life	Wing Sau-fung	
2007	Word Twisters' Adventures	Lap-lan Ching-ching	Nominated – TVB Anniversary Award for My Favourite Female Character (Top 5)
2008	Forensic Heroes II	Bell Ma Kwok-ying	Nominated – TVB Anniversary Award for Best Actress (Top 10)
2008	When Easterly Showers Fall on the Sunny West	Yip Heung-ching	
2009	You're Hired	Lam Miu-miu	Nominated – TVB Anniversary Award for My Favourite Female Character (Top 5)
2009	Beyond the Realm of Conscience	Lau Sam-ho	South Korea Seoul International Drama Awards: The Most Beloved Asian Stars and Hong Kong Best Star; Nominated – TVB Anniversary Award for Best Actress (Top 5); Nominated – TVB Anniversary Award for My Favourite Female Character (Top 5); Nominated – Ming Pao Anniversary Awards for Outstanding Actress in Television
2010	Can't Buy Me Love	Princess Chiu-yeung	TVB Anniversary Award for Best Drama; Power Academy Award for Outstanding Actress in Television; Asian Television Award for Best Actress in a Leading Role; TVB Anniversary Award for My Favourite Female Character; Malaysia Astro MY AOD Favourite Award for Best Actress; Malaysia Astro MY AOD Favourite Awards: Top 10 Favourite TV Characters; Ming Pao Anniversary Awards for Outstanding Actress in Television; Ming Pao Anniversary Awards for My Most Supportive Performance; Singapore StarHub TVB Awards: Best TV Actress; Singapore StarHub TVB Award: Favourite On Screen Couple; South Korea Seoul International Drama Awards: The Most Beloved Asian Stars and Hong Kong Best Star; Nominated – TVB Anniversary Award for Best Actress (Top 5)
2010	Justice, My Foot	Wanzhong Wuyi	
2011	My Sister of Eternal Flower	Fa Lai-Chu	Nominated – TVB Anniversary Award for Best Actress (Top 15)
2011	Female Constables	Liu Mingyue	
2011–2012	When Heaven Burns	Hazel Yip Chi-Yan	TVB Anniversary Award for Best Drama; Nominated – TVB Anniversary Award for Best Actress (Top 5); Nominated – TVB Anniversary Award for My Favourite Female Character (Top 10); Nominated – My AOD Favourite Award for Best Actress (Top 5); Nominated – My AOD Favourite Award for Top 15 Character
2012	Let It Be Love	Chloe Tung Oi-ying	Nominated – My AOD Favourite Award for Best Screen Couple
2012	Marry into the Purple	Shen Yingxiu	
2012	The Legend of Kublai Khan	Empress Chabi	
2014	A Time of Love	Crystal	
2014	Line Walker	Ding Siu-Ka	Singapore StarHub TVB Awards for Best Actress; Singapore Starhub TVB Awards for My Top 6 Favourite Female TV Character; TVB Star Awards Malaysia for My Favourite Actress; TVB Star Awards Malaysia for My Top 15 Favourite TV Character; Nominated – TVB Star Awards Malaysia for Most Favourite On-Screen Couple with Raymond Lam (Top 3); TVB Anniversary Award for Best Actress; TVB Anniversary Award for My Favourite Female Character; TVB Anniversary Award for Best Drama; 15th Huading China Award 2015 for Best TV Series Actress; Weibo's Star 2014 for Weibo's Powerful TV Drama; Weibo's Star 2014 for Weibo's Powerful TV Female Character; Weibo's Star 2014 for Weibo's Powerful On-Screen Couple (with Raymond Lam)
2016	A Time of Love II	Crystal	
2017	Bet Hur	Si Siu-Dung	Nominated – TVB Star Awards Malaysia for My Top 15 Favourite TV Character
2018	My Ages Apart	Leng Lui	Guest Star
2018	Story of Yanxi Palace	Hoifa-Nara Shushen	Nominated_Best Supporting Actress 24th Huading Awards Domestic TV Series Ceremony, China: Breakthrough Actress of the Year
2020	Winter Begonia	Fan Xiang'er	Chinese American Film festival, Golden Angel TV Award Best Leading Actress
2020	The Legend of Xiao Chuo	Xiao Hunian	
2023	The Queen of News	Man Wai-sum	TVB Anniversary Award for Best Actress; TVB Anniversary Awards for Malaysia's Most Favorite Actress; TVB Anniversary Awards for Greater Bay Area's Most Favorite Actress
2024	The Heir to the Throne	Charlotte Yau Hou-yee	
2025	The Queen of News 2	Man Wai-sum	TVB Anniversary Award for Best Actress; TVB Anniversary Awards for Greater Bay Area's Most Favorite Actress
2026	Themis	Yan Hui-zhi	

=== Film ===
Year	Title	Role	Notes
2000	Perfect Match	Ah Yun	
2001	Blue Moon	Yip Ah-yuen	
2002	Love is Butterfly	Sprite	
2003	The Final Shot	Kiwi	
2007	The Lady Iron Chef	Siu Ah-si	
2010	72 Tenants of Prosperity	Aunt Three	Guest star
2011	Love is the Only Answer	Ah Bo	
2015	Triumph in the Skies	Cassie Poon	
2015	Return of the Cuckoo	Chuk Kwan-ho	
2016	Line Walker	Ding Siu Ka	
2017	Always Be With You	Ah Si	
2018	Agent Mr Chan	Yu Xiang	
2018	The Leaker	Carly Yuen	
2018	Golden Job	Zoe	Guest appearance
2019	Siberia	An Lan	
2022	Death Notice	Hon Siu-hung	Guest appearance

=== Variety shows ===
Year	Title	Role	Awards	Notes
2022	Memories Beyond Horizon	Host		

=== Music video appearances ===
Year	Song title	Artist	Notes
2010	"我們很好 We Are Fine"	Raymond Lam	
2014	"We Are the Only One"	Various TVB Artists	
2016	"無人知道雙子座 The Gemini No One Knows"	Joey Yung	
2018	"我們萬歲 Long Live Us"	Eason Chan	

== Discography ==
=== Soundtrack appearances ===
Original title	English title	Television / film	With
帝女芳魂	"The Fragrance of the Princess' Soul"	Theme song for Perish in the Name of Love	Steven Ma
星星的加冕	"Crowning of Stars"	Theme song for HK Children's version of Jewel in the Palace	
與朋友共	"With Friends"	Theme song for Yummy Yummy – Food for Life	Raymond Lam, Kevin Cheng, Tavia Yeung
黃沙中的戀人	"Lovers of the Golden Sands"	Ending song for The Dance of Passion	
出走的公主	"Runaway Princess"	Theme song for Runaway Princess (Thai series)	
卡門	"Carmen"	Song for Glittering Days	
往事只能回味	"The Past Can Only be Reminisced"	Song for Glittering Days	
搖搖的祝勉	"Silent Wishes"	Song for Glittering Days	Wong Cho Lam
像霧又像花	"Like Mist, Like Flower"	Song for Glittering Days	
我的心裏没有他	"My Heart Doesn't Have Him"	Song for Glittering Days	
淚的小雨	"Teary Raindrop"	Song for Glittering Days	Joel Chan
蝶變	"Butterfly Changes"	Theme song for Maidens' Vow	
禁戀	"Forbidden Love"	Ending song for Maidens' Vow	
等你	"Waiting for You"	Ending song for Forensic Heroes II	
陪你哭也只得我	"I Am the Only One to Cry with You"	Ending song for When Easterly Showers Fall on the Sunny West	Joe Ma
風車	(Red) "Pinwheel"	Ending song for Beyond the Realm of Conscience	

== Awards ==
Year	Award	Nominated work
1997	Miss Hong Kong pageant 2nd runner-up	
2000	Hong Kong TVB 33rd Anniversary: My Favorite Character Award	Return of the Cuckoo
2000	Hong Kong TVB 33rd Anniversary: My Favorite Partnership Award	Return of the Cuckoo
2001	Hong Kong TVB 34th Anniversary: My Favorite Character Award	Country Spirit
2002	Hong Kong Next Magazine Award Top Ten Artists Ranked No. 10	
2003	Hong Kong MSN Messenger Dream Lover Ranking: TV Female Artists Category #01	
2003	Hong Kong Next Magazine Award Top Ten Artists Ranked No. 10	
2003	Hong Kong TVB 36th Anniversary: My Favourite Character Award	Perish in the Name of Love
2004	Hong Kong Next Magazine Award Top Ten Artists Ranked No. 06	
2004	Hong Kong Filmart: Top Five Most Bankable Hong Kong TV Female Artists #03	
2004	Hong Kong TVB 37th Anniversary: My Favourite Character Award	War and Beauty
2004	Metro Radio Black and White Television Characters Awards: White Award #1	War and Beauty
2004	Malaysia Astro TV Drama Award: Favourite TV Character Award	Perish in the Name of Love
2005	Hong Kong Next Magazine Award Top Ten Artists Ranked No. 04	
2005	Malaysia Astro TV Drama Award: Best Actress Award	War and Beauty
2005	Malaysia Astro TV Drama Award: Favourite TV Character Award	War and Beauty
2005	Malaysia Astro TV Drama Award: Favourite Couple Award	Point of No Return
2006	Hong Kong Metro Radio: Top Ten Television Artists	
2006	Hong Kong Next Magazine TV Award Top Ten Artists Ranked No. 09	
2006	Malaysia Astro TV Drama Award: Favourite TV Character Award	Yummy Yummy – Food for Life
2006	China TV Drama Award: Most Popular TV Drama Actress for Hong Kong Region	
2006	Hong Kong TVB 39th Anniversary: Best Actress Award	Maidens' Vow
2006	Hong Kong TVB 39th Anniversary: My Favourite Female TV Character Award	Maidens' Vow
2006	Hong Kong Annual Artiste Award: Best TV Actress Award – Gold	
2006	Hong Kong Annual Artiste Award: Best Newcomer Singer Award – Bronze	
2006	China Eric Tom "Hero" Award: Top Four Female Chinese Artists (Fa Dan)	
2007	Hong Kong Next Magazine Awards Top Ten Artistes Ranked No. 01	
2007	Hong Kong Next Magazine Awards: Philips Extraordinary Acting Award	
2007	Hong Kong Spa Treatment Award Most Perfect Body / Appearance Award	
2007	Hong Kong TVB Children's Song Award – Top Ten Favourite Children Song	Crowning of Stars 星星的加冕
2007	Hong Kong TVB Children's Songs Award – Gold	Crowning of Stars 星星的加冕
2007	Hong Kong Metro Hit Radio Children Songs Award – Best Song Award	Crowning of Stars 星星的加冕
2007	Hong Kong Metro Hit Radio Children Song Award – Top Ten Children's Songs	Crowning of Stars 星星的加冕
2007	Hong Kong Metro Hit Radio Children Songs Award – Best Female Singer	Crowning of Stars 星星的加冕
2007	China QQ Entertainment Award – Most Favourite Hong Kong TV Actress	
2007	Singapore i-Weekly Magazine – Most Loved Hong Kong Actress Ranked No. 02	
2007	Hong Kong TVB Award – Long Service Award	
2008	Malaysia Astro TV Drama Award: Favourite TV Character Award	The Dance of Passion
2008	Hong Kong-Asia Film Financing Forum – Top Six Most Popular Hong Kong TV Female Artists	
2008	Hong Kong Next Magazine Awards: Top Ten Artists Ranked #05	
2008	Hong Kong Next Magazine Awards: RMK High Definition Skin Award	
2008	Singapore i-Weekly Magazine – Most Loved Hong Kong Actress Ranked No. 01	
2008	Yahoo Buzz Award – Most Searched TV Female Artist Award	
2008	Annual Golden TVS Award – Most Popular HK-Taiwan TV Actress	
2009	Malaysia Astro WLT TV Drama Award: Favourite TV Character Award	The Drive of Life
2009	Malaysia Astro WLT TV Drama Award: Favourite On Screen Kiss	The Drive of Life
2009	Hong Kong Next Magazine Awards: Top Ten Artists Ranked #08	
2009	Hong Kong Next Magazine Awards: Philips Charismatic Stars Award	
2010	Singapore StarHub TVB Awards: Best TV Actress Award	Forensic Heroes II
2010	Singapore StarHub TVB Award: Favourite Female TV Character Award	Forensic Heroes II
2010	Seoul International Drama Awards: The Most Beloved Asian Stars and Hong Kong Best Star	Beyond The Realm of Conscience
2010	Hong Kong Next Magazine Awards: Top Ten Artist Ranked #03	
2010	Power Academy Award for Outstanding Actress in Television	Can't Buy Me Love
2010	Cosmopolitan Fun Fearless Awards, TV Personality of the Year	Can't Buy Me Love
2010	Hong Kong TVB 43rd Anniversary: My Favourite Female TV Character Award	Can't Buy Me Love
2010	Malaysia Astro MY AOD Favourite Awards: Best Actress Award	Can't Buy Me Love
2010	Malaysia Astro MY AOD Favourite Awards: Top 10 Favorite TV Character	Can't Buy Me Love
2011	Singapore StarHub TVB Awards: Best TV Actress Award	Can't Buy Me Love
2011	Singapore StarHub TVB Award: Favourite On Screen Couple	Can't Buy Me Love
2011	Seoul International Drama Awards: The Most Beloved Asian Stars and Hong Kong Best Star	Can't Buy Me Love
2011	Hong Kong Next Magazine Awards: Top Ten Artist Ranked #01	
2011	16th Asian Television Award: Best Actress	Can't Buy Me Love
2012	Hong Kong Next Magazine Awards: Top Ten Artist Ranked #02	When Heaven Burns
2012	Hong Kong Next Magazine Awards: GlamSmile Best Smile Award	
2012	Cosmo 2012	When Heaven Burns
2012	Yahoo : Best TVB Leading Actress	When Heaven Burns
2013	Marie Claire : Fashion Icon	
2014	Starhub TVB Awards : Best TV Actress	Line Walker
2014	Starhub TVB Award : My Top 6 Favourite Female Character	Line Walker
2014	Astro TVB Star Award : Best TV Actress	Line Walker
2014	Astro TVB Star Award : My Top 15 Favourite TV Character	Line Walker
2014	TVB Weekly Brand Award 2014 : Advertising Queen	
2014	Yahoo Buzz Asia Award: Most Searched TV Female Artist Award	
2014	TVB 47th Anniversary Award: Best Actress	Line Walker
2014	TVB 47th Anniversary Award: My Favorite Female Character	Line Walker
2014	Most Popular TVB Actress In Mainland China	
2015	Huading 15th Award 2015: Best Chinese TV Actress	Line Walker
2015	Weibo Star Awards 2014 : Weibo's Powerful TV Female Character	Line Walker
2015	Weibo Star Awards 2014 : Weibo's Powerful On-Screen Couple (with Raymond Lam)	Line Walker
2018	Domestic TV Series Ceremony, China ( 国剧盛典) : Breakthrough Actress of the Year	Story of Yanxi Palace
2019	Weibo Award Ceremony: Weibo Goddess	Story of Yanxi Palace
2020	Chinese American Film Festival : Golden Angel TV Award Best Leading Actress	Winter Begonia
2023	TVB Anniversary Award for Best Actress	The Queen of News
2023	TVB Star Awards Malaysia for My Favourite Actress	The Queen of News
2023	TVB Greater Bay Area's Most Favorite Actress	The Queen of News
2023	TVB Anniversary Award for Best Dressed Female Artist	
2024	29th Asian Television Awards: Best Actress in a Leading Role	The Queen of News
