= Return of the Cuckoo (film) =

2015 Hong Kong-Chinese film by Patrick Kong

- Valentine's movie poster
- Directed by: Patrick Kong
- Written by: Patrick Kong
- Produced by: Ho Pak-Kwong; Alex Dong; Chan Wing-Lun; Albert Wing-Ho Lee; Huang Junqi; Ren Yue; Stanley Tong
- Starring: Julian Cheung; Charmaine Sheh; Joe Chen; Nancy Sit
- Cinematography: Jason Kwan
- Edited by: Li Ka-Wing
- Music by: Andy Cheung; Chiu Tsang-Hei
- Production companies: iQiyi; China 3D Digital Entertainment
- Release date: November 12, 2015
- Running time: 103 minutes
- Countries: Hong Kong; China
- Language: Cantonese
- Box office: HK$9.95 million (Hong Kong); CN¥23.7 million (mainland China)

Return of the Cuckoo (Chinese: 十月初五的月光) is a 2015 romantic melodrama film sequel to the series Return of the Cuckoo, a 20-episode TVB drama broadcast in 2000. A Hong Kong-Chinese co-production, the film is directed by Patrick Kong and starring original cast Julian Cheung, Charmaine Sheh and Nancy Sit. The film continues the story where the drama left off.

A short music trailer was released in February 2015 to overwhelming popularity. Julian Cheung sings the original theme song “Wishing Kwan Well” (祝君好).

The movie was released on November 12, 2015.

== Story ==
Several years has past after the TV series. Man Cho (Julian Cheung) continues his life as a local errand boy, supplying people with food and items in the local streets of Macau. During this time, Man Cho meets a beautiful mute girl, Kei-Kei. The two share a romantic bond as both communicate through sign language and many thought the two will tie the knot until the unexpected return of his beloved step-sister, Kwan-Ho (Charmaine Sheh). Kwan-Ho returned to give her mother, Qi (Nancy Sit), a surprise visit before Man Cho escort Kwan-Ho to her hotel room. The two smile at each other and Kwan-Ho mentions how great it was to see him again. Unknown to everyone, Kwan-Ho just lost everything in her life.

Kwan-Ho suspected her husband, Szto Lai-Sun (Steven Ma), of having an affair. After the couple argued, Lai-Sun thought it would be best to take a drive with the kids to calm their minds, but that's when they had an auto accident and killing everyone in the car. In an instant, Kwan-Ho lost everything and also blamed herself for the tragedy. She returned to Macau in part to see her friends and family one last time before she attempted suicide. It wasn't long when the entire family finally got word from the in-laws and Man-Cho found Kwan-Ho unconscious. She had slit her wrists and tried to bleed out in the hotel tub; Man-Cho immediately took her to the emergency room for treatment and she survived. However, the doctor warned Kwan-Ho's loved ones that she's dangerously suicidal and will likely attempt suicide again without a watchful eye upon her.

For several days, the family would take exhaustive turns watching over Kwan-Ho. Man-Cho would burn a fair amount of his money to entertain Kwan-Ho as she gambled everything away. Despite watching over her, she still attempted suicide via drug overdose. Man Cho attempt to change her mind by challenging her to do a bungee base jump off Macau Tower. Despite his intense fear of heights, he did it in attempts to cheer her up and it partially worked as he peed in his own pants while falling down. Throughout this time though, Kei-Kei would experience doubt and confusion. She thought she had Man-Cho, but ever-since the return of Kwan-Ho, she has been sidelined and has been frustrated over the situation. As time past, Kwan-Ho would find a reason to live again and resumed the old life she had with her family.

One fateful night, a major rain storm happened. Man Cho asked Kwan-Ho to help pick up Kei-Kei from a bus station, but an unexpected landslide happened and buried Kwan-Ho within. Perfectly covered within the mud, no one would know Kwan-Ho was trapped inside except for Kei-Kei. Wrought with anger and jealousy of Kwan-Ho's hold over Man Cho, she pretended nothing happened and Man Cho came to pick her up. However, as they drove away, Kei-Kei's conscience changed her mind and she told Man Cho what happened to Kwan-Ho; he rushed out to dig her out and rescued her. After Kwan-Ho was confirmed alive and well by the doctors, Man Cho had a chat with Kei-Kei. She realized she never had Man-Cho's heart and the two parted ways.

Some time would pass and Man Cho has been suffering from occasional blurred vision. He has been keeping the matter to himself to his family to avoid their worries. Man Cho has been suffering from a growing blood clot after hitting his head from saving Kwan-Ho from that landslide. The family eventually finds out after he faints in front of everyone. The family doctor warned him he needs neuro surgery soon or he'll die. However, there's a major risk, there's a chance he'll suffer permanent memory loss. The family agrees to the risk as not taking the surgery will mean certain death. Upon their final moments before surgery, Man Cho declares to Kwan-Ho that they'll be together this time, no matter what. After the surgery, Man Cho wakes up to tell Kwan-Ho that everything is fine. To Kwan-Ho's happiness, he didn't lose his memory, however, the truth is unknown. Man Cho wrote a note for himself to recite to Kwan-Ho when he awakens, suggesting he lost his memory, but he wanted to calm her worries even if it means a delayed inevitability. The story would have an open ending, unsure of the fate of Man-Cho and Kwan-Ho.

== Cast ==
- Julian Cheung as Man Cho 文初 (Cho Ko Ko 初哥哥)
- Charmaine Sheh as Chuk Kwan-ho 祝君好
- Joe Chen as Kei-Kei
- Nancy Sit as Chu Sa-kiu 朱莎嬌 (QE)
- Michael Tong as Kam Sing 金勝
- Kwok Fung as [Chuk Kwan Ho's Dad]
- Helen Ma as Aunt Wuto
- Irene Wong as Wong Hoi-Lam
- Joyce Cheng as Keung
- Steven Ma as Szto Lai-Sun (Special Guest appearance)

== Production ==
In November 2014, director Patrick Kong announced filming the movie version. The first state of filming started in December 2014. In Macau, the cast en crew held their first promotion tour. The second state of filming is started in March and ended in April 2015.

== Reception ==
By the November 22 weekend, the film had grossed HK$9.95 million at the Hong Kong box office. The film grossed CN¥23.7 million on its opening weekend in mainland China.
