= Triumph in the Skies (film) =

2015 Hong Kong-Chinese film by Wilson Yip

- Film poster
- Directed by: Wilson Yip; Matt Chow
- Written by: Matt Chow; Jun Sin; Xu Lengfeng
- Produced by: Tommy Leung
- Starring: Louis Koo; Sammi Cheng; Francis Ng; Julian Cheung; Charmaine Sheh; Amber Kuo; Océane Zhu; Dean Liu
- Cinematography: Jason Kwan
- Edited by: Azrael Chung
- Music by: Alan Wong; Janet Yung
- Production companies: Media Asia Films; Shaw Movie City Hong Kong; Shaw Brothers Pictures; One Cool Film Production; Dongyang Enlight Pictures; China Film Media Asia Audio Video Distribution; Media Asia Distribution (Beijing)
- Distributed by: Media Asia Distribution
- Release date: 19 February 2015
- Running time: 100 minutes
- Countries: Hong Kong; China
- Languages: Cantonese; Mandarin; English
- Box office: US$24.59 million (China)

Triumph in the Skies (Chinese: 衝上雲霄) is a 2015 romantic drama film directed by Wilson Yip and Matt Chow. Starring Louis Koo, Sammi Cheng, Francis Ng, Julian Cheung, Charmaine Sheh, Amber Kuo, and Océane Zhu, the film is an adaptation of the Triumph in the Skies television series.

Production started on 6 August 2014. The film was released on February 19, 2015.

== Synopsis ==
The movie focuses on multiple romantic relationships in the flight industry.

Young pilot Branson (Louis Koo) takes over Skylette Airlines, his father's aviation empire, only to realize that his old flame Cassie (Charmaine Sheh) is a flight attendant there. Several years previously, he was forced to break up with her and move to New York to take care of his father's business. To this day, the two continue to harbor feelings for each other but decide to keep them bottled up.

In an effort to rebrand the airline, Branson invites rock idol TM (Sammi Cheng) to star in an upcoming commercial and appoints Sam (Francis Ng) as her flying consultant. Incongruent in both tastes and experience, this odd couple gets off on the wrong foot. However, as the shoot progresses they slowly discover each other's merits, developing a strong mutual attraction.

Jayden (Julian Cheung) left Skylette to become a pilot of private jets and ends up meeting Kika (Amber Kuo) during a flight. At first Jayden perceives her to be wayward and shallow, but they turn out to have a lot in common and start falling madly in love.

== Cast ==
- Louis Koo as Branson Cheung (張春亮)
- Sammi Cheng as TM Tam (譚夢)
- Francis Ng as Samuel "Sam" Tong (唐亦琛)
- Julian Cheung as Jayden "Captain Cool" Koo (顧夏陽)
- Charmaine Sheh as Cassie Poon (潘家詩)
- Amber Kuo as Kika Sit (薛健雅)
- Océane Zhu as Winnie
- Dean Liu as Tony
- Kenneth Ma as Roy Ko (高志宏)
- Elena Kong as Heather Fong (方芮嘉)
- Jun Kung as TM's manager
- Ma Jin as Thomas
- Liao Jingsheng as Branson's father
- Yiming Ma as Thomas' friend

== Box office ==
The film has earned US$24.59 million in China and HK$21.5 million (US$2.78 million) in Hong Kong.

== Song list ==
- "歲月如歌" by Eason Chan
- "How Much Will We Remember" by The Pancakes
- "I Hate You But I Love You" by Pollie Tong
- "I Hate You But I Love You" by Janet Yung and Subyub Lee
- "Somewhere Over the Rainbow" by Sammi Cheng
- "Hold on, Watch on" by Tomii Chan
- "Invoice of Love" by Subyub Lee
- "Reach for a Star" by Janet Yung
- "Slam the Ball" by Shawn Wong
- "Breathless Moment" by Janet Yung
- "Oh Boy" by Subyub Lee
- "最後一個" composed by Alan Wong and Janet Yung
- "She Knocked My Door" composed by Tomii Chan
