= The Queen of News 2 =

2025 Hong Kong television series

- Also known as: 新聞女王²
- Genre: Workplace drama; Psychological drama
- Written by: Sonia Lo; Kwok Kin-lok; Oscar Fung; Chan Ka-man; Chan Kam-lok
- Directed by: Keung Chun-kit; Doumy Yin; Wong Chui-ying
- Starring: Charmaine Sheh; Bosco Wong; Selena Lee; Samantha Ko; Venus Wong
- Ending theme: "Crystal Clear" by Quinn Lui
- Country of origin: Hong Kong
- Original language: Cantonese
- No. of episodes: 25

Production
- Executive producers: Chung Shu-kai; Xu Guan
- Producers: Kwan Man-shum; Quan Xiang-lan
- Production locations: Hong Kong; Shenzhen
- Running time: 43–44 minutes
- Production companies: 77 Atelier; Youku

Original release
- Network: TVB Jade; myTV Super; Youku
- Release: 10 November – 15 December 2025

Related
- The Queen of News

The Queen of News² (Chinese: 新聞女王²) is a Hong Kong television drama series produced by 77 Atelier in collaboration with the mainland Chinese streaming platform Youku, with Chung Shu-kai as executive producer. The 25-episode series premiered on Youku on 5 November 2025, followed by its debut on TVB Jade on 10 November 2025. Serving as the sequel to the 2023 hit series The Queen of News, the drama features an ensemble cast led by Charmaine Sheh, Bosco Wong, and Selena Lee. The plot follows veteran news anchor Man Wai-sum as she returns to the media landscape to acquire and lead the independent online outlet Open Platform, triggering an intense corporate and ethical confrontation with her former network SNK News, now driven by ratings-focused leadership under Koo Siu-wa.

The series explores the systemic conflict between traditional broadcast journalism and emerging new media platforms, incorporating storylines inspired by real-world events and contemporary media controversies. It garnered attention for its portrayal of the evolving media landscape and related social issues, addressing topics such as the commercialization of news, misinformation, the influence of financial and technological forces on journalism, and the sustainability of local media in an increasingly digitalized and globalized environment. The series was also a major commercial success, contributing significantly to TVB's growth in advertising revenue and overall profitability. At the 58th TVB Anniversary Awards, it won nine honors, including Best Television Series, Best Actor, and Best Actress.

== Cast and characters ==
- Charmaine Sheh as Man Wai-sum, a former SNK News anchor who returns to the media industry after acquiring the online media platform Open Platform, challenging traditional news outlets while navigating media power structures. Sheh performed underwater and high-altitude stunt sequences for the role.
- Bosco Wong as Koo Siu-wa (Kingston), the market-driven chief director of SNK News who prioritizes commercial profit over journalistic integrity, using aggressive tactics to boost ratings and corporate authority to suppress internal opposition. His portrayal is characterized by cynical dialogue and a contemptuous demeanor.
- Selena Lee as Cheung Ka-yin (Alice), the assistant chief director of SNK News who manages internal power struggles while covertly investigating Leung King-yan's death, suspecting Koo Siu-wa's involvement.
- Samantha Ko as Hui Sze-ching (Cathy), a former anchor turned pragmatic government press officer who balances political and media interests, motivated by the belief that power drives resource allocation.
- Venus Wong as Lau Yim (Carrie), a former SNK News reporter who encounters entrepreneurial challenges while founding Open Platform.
- James Ng as Ma Ka-ming (Penny or PM), a former SNK News cameraman who co-founds Open Platform and later becomes Lau Yim's romantic partner.
- Eric Tang as Yu Ying-fei, a former SNK News chief director who later becomes the news director of Open Platform.
- Hera Chan as Tong Chi-yiu, a disgraced former reporter turned online influencer. Resentful over her public dismissal by Man Wai-sum, she allies with Koo Siu-wa and uses online platforms to manipulate public opinion.
- Matthew Ho as Poon Chi-ngow (Ivan), an SNK News anchor who is later promoted to assistant chief director.
- Shaun Tam as Chan Tsz-kit, a car repair shop owner and former cameraman who remains a supportive confidant to his ex-girlfriend, Man Wai-sum.
- Mimi Kung as Fong Law Lai-sheung, the chairwoman of SNK News. Kung performed an 11-minute monologue that was filmed in a single take.
- Matthew Ko as Shiu Chun-lok, Cheung Ka-yin's ex-boyfriend and a lawyer who advises Open Platform.
- Joman Chiang as Pak Shu-kwan (Diana), a technology entrepreneur who invests in Open Platform.
- Kenneth Ma as Leung King-yan (George), an assistant chief director at SNK News whose death while covering a historic rainstorm—initially believed to be a heroic sacrifice—later becomes the subject of a major investigation.
- Carmen Ngai as Sin Man-chi (Amber), an SNK News anchor who later joins Open Platform.
- Oscar Tao as Lau Chun-pong (Buck), a member of the SNK News AI production team.
- Vivian Koo as Szeto Yui-tin, a member of the SNK News AI production team.

=== Guest stars and cameos ===
Guest appearances include Patricia Ha as Madam Yuen, a respected journalist and Wai-sum's adoptive mother, with Jacky Cai portraying a younger version of the character. Kelly Fu appears as Dr. Yeung, a psychologist helping Wai-sum address past trauma, while Evergreen Mak portrays a maintenance worker who offers workplace survival advice. Ben Yuen appears as Richard Wu, a Southeast Asian tycoon linked to a fraud ring. Regina Ho, who appeared in the first season, makes a brief appearance in a post-finale bonus clip not included in the main series.

=== Promotional imagery ===
Promotional materials for the series use symbolic imagery to represent character roles and conflicts. Man Wai-sum is associated with a sword representing journalistic ethics, while Koo Siu-wa is associated with a dagger representing pragmatic self-interest. Cheung Ka-yin and Leung King-yan are associated with scepters representing institutional authority, Hui Sze-ching with a bow and arrow representing adaptability and strategy, and Lau Yim with a harp representing idealism and emotional influence. Tong Chi-yiu is depicted unarmed with an intense expression, which was described as suggesting underlying hostility.

== Plot ==
Six months after leaving SNK following the death of her colleague Leung King-yan (Kenneth Ma), veteran news anchor Man Wai-sum (Charmaine Sheh) returns to the media industry amid major changes in the journalism landscape. During her absence, SNK undergoes significant restructuring under the leadership of Koo Siu-wa (Bosco Wong), who prioritizes ratings and profit, while Cheung Ka-yin (Selena Lee) rises within the organization. Meanwhile, Hui Sze-ching (Samantha Ko) transitions into a government role in public communications. Wai-sum subsequently acquires Open Platform, an independent online media outlet founded by Lau Yim (Venus Wong), leading to intense competition between traditional television media and emerging online journalism.

As Wai-sum rebuilds her influence, she becomes involved in a series of major news events and investigations, including a building collapse, a suspicious drowning at a billionaire's yacht party, industrial accidents, and a pharmaceutical scandal involving a missing whistleblower. At the same time, SNK introduces AI-generated news anchors and increasingly sensationalized reporting methods, creating severe ethical conflicts within the newsroom. Driven by a desire for closure, Wai-sum also begins uncovering the truth behind King-yan's death during a catastrophic rainstorm, revealing suppressed memories and hidden evidence surrounding his final moments.

Subsequently, Wai-sum becomes entangled with a cult-like organization accused of psychological manipulation, while an internationally acclaimed journalist—and Wai-sum's godmother—returns to Hong Kong amid plans for a foreign media expansion that ultimately collapses. Along the way, the journalist helps Wai-sum overcome her childhood trauma. Internal power struggles within SNK intensify when Wai-sum rises to become chairwoman of the network, prompting a sidelined Siu-wa to collaborate with the fraudulent Fu Yu Fund in an attempt to consolidate corporate control. With the help of Ka-yin, Lau Yim, and Sze-ching, Wai-sum investigates interconnected financial crimes, online fraud operations, and corporate corruption linked to the fund.

In the final arc, Wai-sum, Ka-yin, and their fellow journalists uncover a massive conspiracy involving the Fu Yu Fund and its associated transnational scam organization. During a live broadcast, Wai-sum exposes the syndicate on air, thwarting Siu-wa's corporate coup and securing control of the network.

== Production ==
Following the success of The Queen of News (2023), a sequel was announced at the Hong Kong Filmart in March 2024, alongside a proposed film adaptation that had yet to materialize by 2026. By May 2024, the production team had completed the script outline and begun casting for new roles. The sequel retained its original creative core, including executive producer Chung Shu-kai, producer Kwan Man-shum, story developer Sonia Lo, and script supervisor Kwok Kin-lok.

The cast held a script reading session in March 2025, and principal photography took place between 25 April and July 2025. Filming was split between Hong Kong and Shenzhen, with the SNK News studio set constructed in Shenzhen. The series was shot entirely on location and secured rare access to the HSBC Main Building for select scenes.

Rather than using conventional sequel numbering, the series title features a superscript "²". Chung stated that the symbol represents "squared," signifying that the sequel's scale and narrative complexity expand beyond a single media company to encompass the broader journalism industry. The second season attracted significant commercial interest, securing partnerships with major brands through endorsements, product placements, venue sponsorships, and IP-based short-form content.

In November 2025, at a promotional event held during the series' broadcast, a spin-off centered on the character Hui Sze-ching was announced; however, filming had not yet commenced as of 2026.

== Themes and narrative structure ==
The series explores the dynamics of Hong Kong-style journalism, which closely mirrors Western media practices, with a central focus on the tension between public-interest journalism and the pursuit of audience ratings. According to the creative team, the series was developed with an emphasis on maintaining a commitment to journalistic ideals. The production team conducted extensive field research and interviewed media professionals to examine the real-world perspectives and emotional experiences of reporters. Chung explained that, although journalism as a practice aspires to objectivity, journalists are inevitably influenced by personal experiences and subjective judgment, particularly when reporting on events in which they are directly involved. He identified this tension between professional neutrality and human subjectivity as a central thematic concern of the series.

Remember what you see is just a perspective, it doesn't represent the facts; what others see are just viewpoints, they don't represent the truth.

— A quote from Cheung Ka-yin (portrayed by Selena Lee) offering a perspective on journalism.

The narrative explores more than ten distinct journalistic topics, with nearly 90 percent of the storylines inspired by real-world news events. The season's arc-based storylines draw on several contemporary controversies and high-profile incidents, including a catastrophic building collapse rooted in institutional corruption, the internet mystery Cicada 3301, AI deepfake technology, the drowning of Thai actress Tangmo, a 2023 Kowloon City film-set aerial platform collapse, the South Korean Providence cult scandal, and a medical equipment donation scheme.

Another thematic conflict in the sequel is the confrontation between traditional media and new media organizations. The script also critiques contemporary "self-media"—individual content creators and online personalities—illustrating how the pursuit of internet traffic can result in sensationalism, lack of fact-checking, and breaches of privacy.

The series continues the previous season's approach to characterization, avoiding traditional protagonist tropes in favor of morally ambiguous characters, maintaining the premise that "there is not a single purely good person" in the narrative. Alongside these industry dynamics, the show incorporates themes of female empowerment, emphasizing the autonomy of modern women who navigate distinct choices regarding their careers, relationships, and families while remaining true to themselves.

== Music ==
Track Listing
No.	Title	Lyrics	Music	Artist(s)	Length
1.	"News (Opening Instrumental)"		Kong Fai
2.	"Crystal Clear"	Quinn Lui	Kong Fai	Quinn Lui	3:41
3.	"Seed of Truth"	Quinn Lui	Kong Fai	Windy Zhan	3:09

== Ratings and reception ==
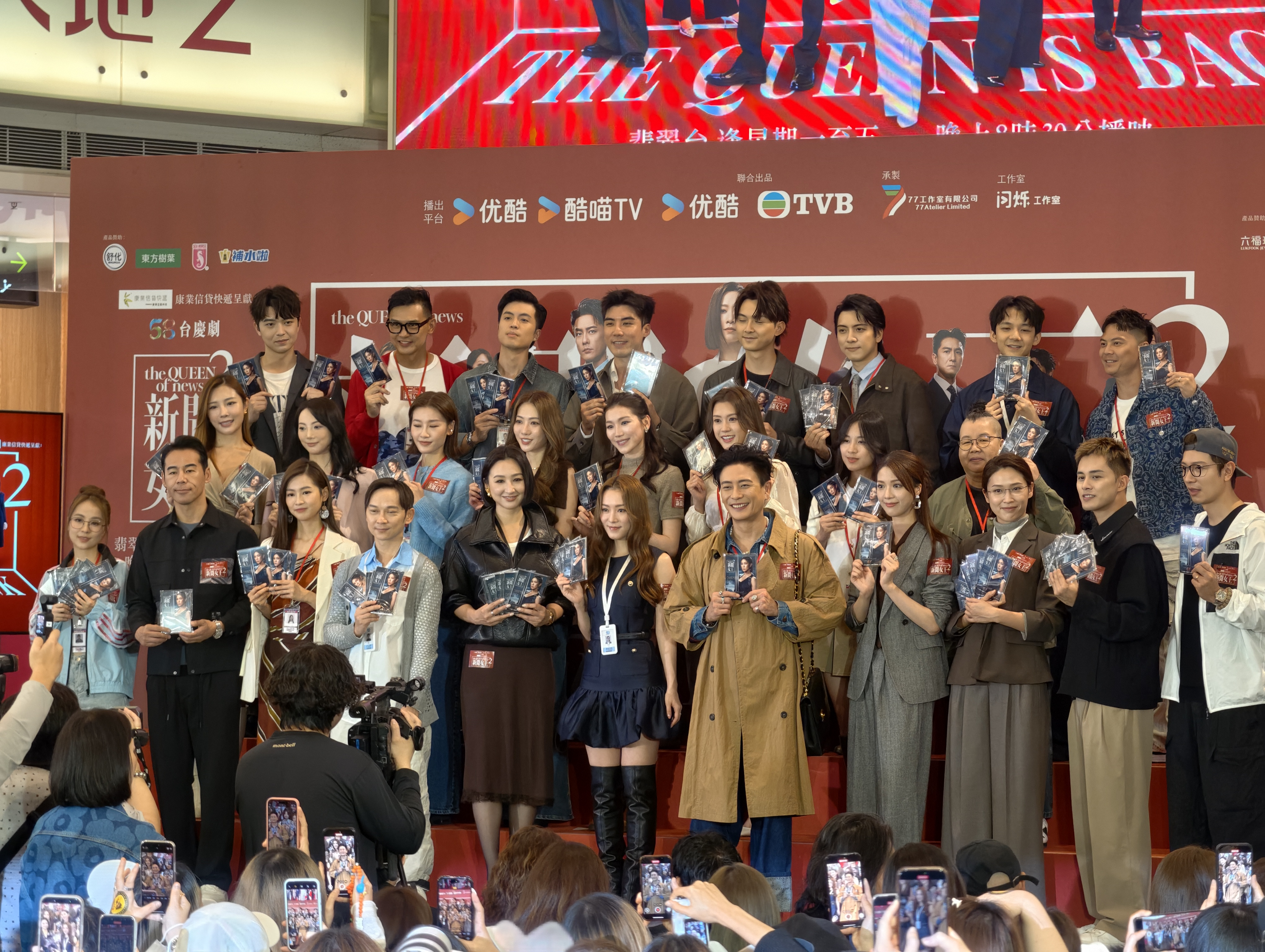
The cast at a promotional event at Citywalk in 2025.

In Hong Kong, the series drew 1.35 million viewers during its premiere week and 1.46 million for the finale. In the Google 2025 Search Rankings, the series placed ninth among the "Top 10 Search Keywords" and topped the "Trending Dramas and Programs" category. It also ranked second on Yahoo's 2025 list of "Most Searched Local TV Dramas" and placed second on DailyView's 2025 TVB popularity list, which measured "internet heat" based on online engagement across more than 20,000 websites and channels in Hong Kong and Macau.

The series attracted attention for its depiction of media ecology and social issues, particularly its exploration of news commercialization, the influence of financial backers on journalism, and the sustainability of local media in an increasingly globalized and digitalized landscape. Shum Ngo-ming of Ming Pao Weekly characterized the series as a bold, self-reflective sequel that felt "authentically Hong Kong," noting that while TVB generally avoids overt political themes, the series successfully engaged with sensitive social and industry issues through a grounded, realistic approach. A former news anchor stated that the depicted office politics felt realistic, recalling his own experience of managerial surveillance, though he noted that real-life journalists were less affluent than the show's protagonist and often relied on side jobs.

Public and critical reaction was mixed regarding the show's execution. While some viewers defended the series as standard dramatic entertainment, it received criticism for its unrealistic depiction of television news production, excessive product placement, and perceived efforts to appeal more to mainland Chinese audiences. Additionally, although the series received praise for its character styling and wardrobe, its extensive use of beauty filters drew criticism for creating an unnatural visual appearance.

The series contributed to TVB's advertising revenue growth during the fourth quarter of 2025 and spurred additional television and digital advertising revenue around its launch, contributing significantly to TVB's return to annual profitability after years of financial losses. The commercial success of both the original series and its sequel also increased the public profile of several cast members, leading to endorsement deals and promotional appearances.

In mainland China, the series appeared on more than 350 cross-platform and social media rankings, reaching number one in nine categories, including the Hot Search, Drama Popularity, and Hong Kong Drama charts. It generated substantial online engagement, with 257 related topics appearing on trending lists; content under the primary hashtag accumulated more than 3.23 billion views, while related subtopics recorded an additional 580 million views. On Youku, the drama accumulated more than 250 million platform video views and secured the highest advertising revenue among all Hong Kong dramas at the time. Viewers and commentators attributed the show's popularity to its portrayal of female empowerment, highlighting its depiction of independent, ambitious women navigating workplace power dynamics. The series depicts female characters succeeding through competence and strategy rather than appearance, which some critics interpreted as a challenge to narratives that link female success to reliance on male support.

Week	Episodes	Airing dates	Ratings (Note: According to Hong Kong's TV rating system, each rating point represents approximately 64,670 viewers.)		Ref.
Week	Episodes	Airing dates	Cross-platform peak ratings	Viewership	Ref.
1	1 – 5	10–14 November 2025	20.9 points	1.35 million	
2	6 – 9	17–21 November 2025	19.1 points	1.24 million	
3	10 – 13	24–28 November 2025	20.5 points	1.33 million	
4	14 – 18	1–5 December 2025	21.3 points	1.38 million	
5	19 – 23	8–12 December 2025	21.4 points	1.38 million	
6	24 – 25	15 December 2025	22.6 points	1.46 million	

== Release ==
The series premiered on Youku on 5 November 2025, and on TVB Jade and myTV Super on 10 November 2025. To promote the series, Charmaine Sheh and Bosco Wong briefly appeared as guest hosts in character on the TVB infotainment program Scoop on 9 November 2025.

== Awards and nominations ==
The last time I won, I felt it was Charmaine Sheh who won. But this time, I believe it was Man Wai-sum who won. I didn't just play the role - I became the role. She guided me, and through the compelling storyline, it resonated with the audience once again. I'd like to say to (my character), "I love you, Man Wai-sum!"

— Charmaine Sheh's "Best Actress" winning speech at the 58th TVB Anniversary Awards

The Queen of News² received multiple accolades in 2025 and 2026. At the 58th TVB Anniversary Awards, the series won Best Television Series, while Bosco Wong and Charmaine Sheh won Best Actor and Best Actress, respectively. For Sheh, it marked her fourth win in the Best Actress category at the TVB Anniversary Awards. The drama also received several popularity awards in the Greater Bay Area and North America, and its theme song, "Seed of Truth", won Best Television Theme Song. Outside of TVB, Sheh was named Actress of the Year at the The Beijing News Annual Television Ranking Awards and received the Weibo Outstanding Actress of the Year award. In 2026, the series received a Finalist Diploma in the Drama category at the New York Festivals TV & Film Awards.

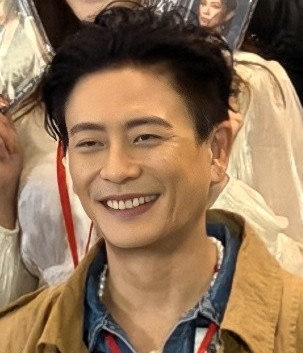
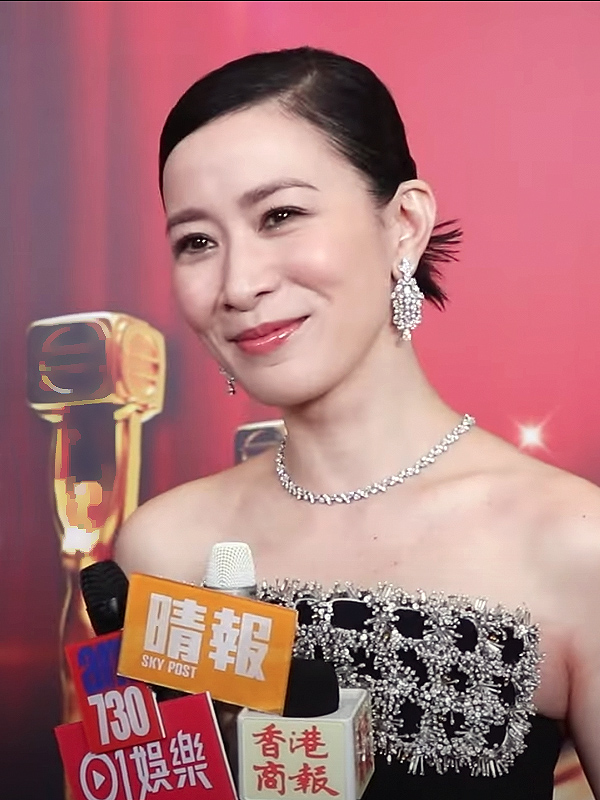
Bosco Wong and Charmaine Sheh, winners of Best Actor (his first) and Best Actress (her fourth) at the 58th TVB Anniversary Awards.

Year	Award	Category	Nominated work	Results	Ref.
2025	58th TVB Anniversary Awards	Best Television Series	The Queen of News 2	Won	
2025	58th TVB Anniversary Awards	Best Actor	Bosco Wong	Won	
2025	58th TVB Anniversary Awards	Best Actress	Charmaine Sheh	Won	
2025	58th TVB Anniversary Awards	Best Actress	Selena Lee	Nominated	
2025	58th TVB Anniversary Awards	Best Supporting Actor	Matthew Ho	Won	
2025	58th TVB Anniversary Awards	Best Supporting Actor	Eric Tang	Nominated	
2025	58th TVB Anniversary Awards	Best Supporting Actor	James Ng	Nominated	
2025	58th TVB Anniversary Awards	Best Supporting Actress	Venus Wong	Won	
2025	58th TVB Anniversary Awards	Best Supporting Actress	Mimi Kung	Nominated	
2025	58th TVB Anniversary Awards	Best Supporting Actress	Samantha Ko	Nominated	
2025	58th TVB Anniversary Awards	My Favorite Television Series (Greater Bay Area)	The Queen of News 2	Won	
2025	58th TVB Anniversary Awards	My Favorite Actor in a Leading Role (Greater Bay Area)	Bosco Wong	Won	
2025	58th TVB Anniversary Awards	My Favorite Actress in a Leading Role (Greater Bay Area)	Charmaine Sheh	Won	
2025	58th TVB Anniversary Awards	My Favorite Actress in a Leading Role (Greater Bay Area)	Selena Lee	Nominated	
2025	58th TVB Anniversary Awards	Best Television Theme Song	"Seed of Truth" (by Windy Zhan)	Won	
2025	58th TVB Anniversary Awards	My Favorite Television Series (North America)	The Queen of News 2	Won	
2025	58th TVB Anniversary Awards	My Favorite Actress in a Leading Role (North America)	Charmaine Sheh	Won	
2025	The Beijing News Annual Television Ranking Award	Actress of the Year	Charmaine Sheh	Won	
2025	Weibo Awards	Weibo Outstanding Actors of the Year	Charmaine Sheh	Won	
2025	Zhihu Annual Film and Television List	Screen Figures of the Year	Charmaine Sheh	Honored	
2026	New York Festivals TV & Film Awards	Entertainment Program – Drama (Finalist Diploma)	The Queen of News 2	Won	
