= Julian Cheung =

Hong Kong actor and singer

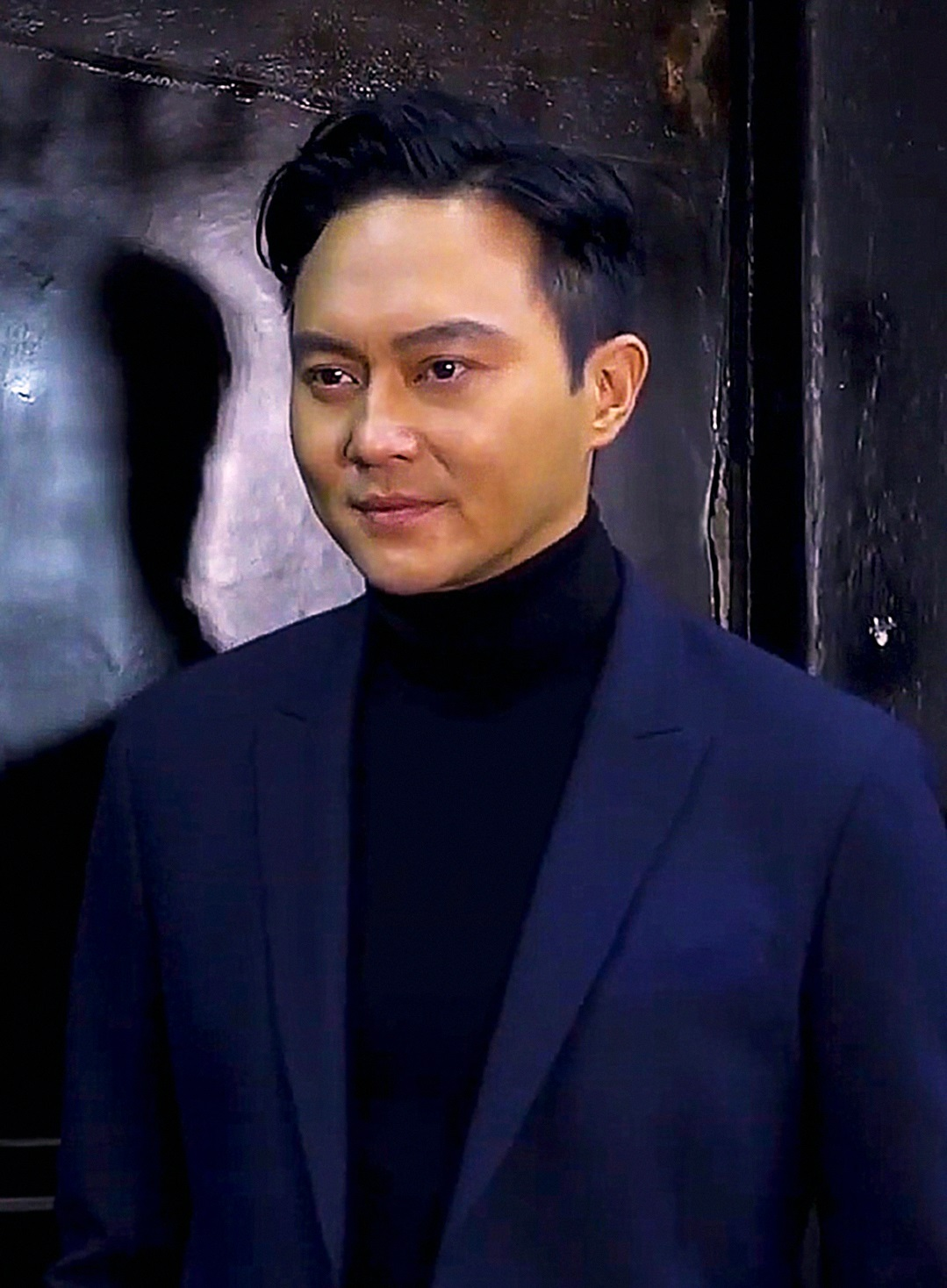
- Cheung in 2013
- Born: 27 August 1971 (age 55); North Point, British Hong Kong
- Occupations: Singer; songwriter; actor
- Years active: 1991–present
- Spouse: Anita Yuen (m. 2001)
- Children: 1

Chinese name
- Traditional Chinese: 張智霖
- Simplified Chinese: 张智霖
Transcriptions
Standard Mandarin
- Hanyu Pinyin: Zhāng Zhìlín
Yue: Cantonese
- Jyutping: Zoeng1 Zi3 Lam4
- Musical career
- Also known as: Chilam
- Genres: Cantopop, Mandopop
- Label: Neway Star

Julian Cheung Chi-lam (born 27 August 1971), better known by his stage name Chilam, is a Hong Kong singer and actor. Cheung is known for his role as Guo Jing in the 1994 TV series adaptation of the Wuxia novel, The Legend of the Condor Heroes, and also as Chi-Kin from the TVB drama Cold Blood Warm Heart (1996).

Cheung hit instant fame in 1991 with the release of his first single, "A Modern Love Story" with Maple Hui and has since been the only artist that has sold the most copies for a debut album under IFPI. In 1992, Cheung received a TVB Jade Solid Gold award as Best Newcoming Singer (Bronze) for his first album. In 2000, Cheung reap 2 notable awards from TVB for the drama, Return of the Cuckoo.

== Early life ==
Born in Hong Kong on 27 August 1971, Cheung spent most of his early years in Hong Kong attending all-male Catholic primary school. He later went to a Protestant secondary school. He has an elder sister and a younger sister. When he was 13, his parents divorced and he and his father emigrated to Australia when he was 15. He attended Pendle Hill High School in Sydney. In 1986, his parents remarried but later divorced a second time. He was a good actor and singer and his father thought he had a gift and sent him to an acting school.

== Career ==
In 1990 when Cheung was 19, Cheung visited Hong Kong during his summer vacation and was reacquainted with his cousin and childhood friend, Anna Ueyama (上山安娜). Anna introduced Cheung to his first manager, Tony. Impressed with Cheung's voice, Tony immediately signed him into IFPI and started to train him. Cheung then recorded his first song, a duet album with Hong Kong singer Maple Hui (許秋怡). The debut single, "A Modern Love Story", was released by the record company Fitto in 1991 and was an immense success. This single was on IFPI Album Sales Chart for 11 weeks, and as of today still holds the IFPI record for newcomer singers.

That same year, Cheung signed into TVB and starred in his first television series, Peak of Passion, released in 1992. A year later, he filmed his very first movie, A Warrior's Tragedy. Cheung reached to the peak of his popularity in 1994 when he took part as the role of Guo Jing from The Legend of the Condor Heroes, which helped him to become one of the most favourite actors at that time. In 1996, he starred in the TVB classic hit drama Cold Blood Warm Heart, which acclaimed him notable praises of his performance, making him a household name and boosted his career in the Hong Kong entertainment industry.

After the release of Cold Blood Warm Heart, he transitioned into movies such as Perfect Match and Comic King. He returned to TVB in 2000 in the series Return of the Cuckoo, which was a tremendous success with Charmaine Sheh, reaching a peak of 40 points. His status and recognition as an actor dramatically increased to countries such as Singapore, Malaysia, Vietnam, Thailand, Taiwan and China. He also reaped 2 awards in the TVB award ceremony (My Favorite Couple-with Charmaine Sheh and My Favorite Themesong), adding to his string of wins. in 2003, he won My Favorite Leading Character again for his role as Yeung Kwong from Take My Word For It. His performance with Charmaine Sheh in the 2004 drama Point of No Return also won the pair the Best Onscreen Couple award at the 2005 Astro Awards in Malaysia. Cheung has also found success in the Mainland entertainment industry with starring roles in the television series Ni Shui Han, Lu Xiao Feng, and Red Powder.

In 2012, he returned to TVB to film sequel to TVB's 2003 blockbuster television drama Triumph in the Skies. His role as Captain Koo has boosted his popularity once again and earned him a spot in the peoples' hearts.

Cheung has earned 60 million HKD in 2014.

=== Music ===
His first concert at Hong Kong Coliseum was held on 27 March 2011 which the title for the concert was I Am An Alien. On 6 July 2014, he had his second concert at Hong Kong Coliseum on four-sided stage, called Crazy Hours.

In 2021, he joined the cast of reality TV show Call Me by Fire as a contestant.

== Personal life ==
Cheung is married to Hong Kong actress Anita Yuen. They have a son together, born in 2006. Their relationship started back in the 1990s where they met each other in the Hong Kong entertainment business in a music video they did together and during that time, they were at the height of their Hong Kong entertainment careers and eventually by 1994, they publicly announced their relationship. They secretly wedded in 2001 in San Francisco, California. Anita said in 2021 that they tried to have another child, but all efforts failed including in vitro fertilisation.

Cheung's uncle is Charlie Cho.

== Discography ==
He has recorded albums in both Cantonese and Mandarin. He has been with various record labels, such as Fitto Entertainment, Sony Music, EMI (Cantonese albums only), Rock Records (Mandarin albums only), Cinepoly Records (subsidiary of Universal Music Hong Kong), Starj & Snazz and Neway Star.

- Modern Love Story (現代愛情故事) (November 1991) (duet album with Maple Hui)

Note: The album was later re-released under the EMI label and later, Warner Music.

- Make Me Happy (逗我開心吧) (October 1992)
- Miss You Much (如此這般想你) (September 1993)
- CHILAM (October 1994)
- Love at Creation Times (愛在創意的日子)(November 1994)
- Love Played A Joke on Us (愛情開了我們一個玩笑) (1995)
- Thanks For Your Concern (多謝關心) (June 1995)
- Cold Blood Warm Heart Compilation (怎會如此) (March 1996)
- Insincere (言不由衷) (1996)
- Smile With Tears Single (笑中有淚) (1996)
- I Love You Too (我也喜歡你) (March 1997)
- Best of the Best 22 Songs (霖歌精選22首) (1997)
- Black Temptation (黑色誘惑) (November 1997)
- Yes or No (有沒有) (1998)
- Monsieur Enfant EP (孩子先生) (1999)
- Chi Lam Love Collection (至霖情歌集) (1999)
- Tian Di Nan Er (天地男兒) (1999)
- Moonlight / Return of the Cuckoo Original Soundtrack (十月初五的月光 原聲大碟) (2000)
- Ten Fingers Interlocked (十指緊扣) (2000)
- Ten Fingers Interlocked Special Edition (十指緊扣（特別版）) (2001)
- California Red 903 Live in Concert (Video) (2001)
- EMI Best Music Collection (星聲傳集 – 張智霖) (2002)
- Love & Dream (愛與夢 粵語新曲+精選) (2003)
- I Am Chilam (2009)
- I AM CHILAM 2nd Version (2009)
- What is Love (2011)
- Like A Song (single) (歲月如歌) (2013)
- DEJA VU (2014)

== Filmography ==
=== Television series ===
Year	Title	Role	Notes
1992	The Peak of Passion 沖天小子	Cheung Pui-chun	
1993	The Mystery of the Condor Hero	Chan Yuen-fung	
1994	Remembrance 黃浦傾情	Yam Hong-fei	
1994	The Legend of the Condor Heroes	Kwok Ching	
1995	The Ching Emperor 天子屠龍	Kangxi Emperor	
1996	Cold Blood Warm Heart	Law Tze-kin	
1999	Romance of the White Haired Maiden	Zhuo Yihang	
2000	Return of the Cuckoo	Man Chor	Nominated – TVB Anniversary Award for Best Actor
2000	Dare to Strike 掃冰者		
2001	Palm of Rulai 如來神掌		
2002	The New Judge 草民縣令	Zhang Fugui	
2002	Take My Word For It	Yeung Kwong	Nominated – TVB Anniversary Award for Best Actor
2003	Flying Daggers	Li Huai	
2003	Point of No Return	Chow Tin-chi	
2004	Ni Shui Han 逆水寒		
2004	ICAC Investigators 2004 廉政行動2004	Wong Kai-chung	
2004	Shades of Truth	Ha Chung Yam/Mo Chung	Nominated – TVB Anniversary Award for Best Actor
2006	A Beautiful New World 美麗新天地		
2007	Red Powder 紅粉	Pu Jiawei	
2007	The Legend of Lu Xiaofeng	Lu Xiaofeng	
2007	Long Men Yi Zhan 龍門驛站	Xun Chengma	
2010	Who's the Hero 勝者為王	Fu Kam-po	
2011	The Rippling Blossom	Yue Chi-ying	Nominated – TVB Anniversary Award for Best Actor; Nominated – TVB Anniversary Award for My Favourite Male Character
2011	ICAC Investigators 2011 廉政行動2011	Yeung Kwok-chu	
2013	Triumph in the Skies II	Jayden Koo (Captain Cool)	Nominated – 2013 TVB Anniversary Awards for Best Actor (Top 5); Won – 2013 TVB Anniversary Awards for My Favourite TV Male Character
2017	Operation Love	Angel	Special appearance
2018	Shadow of Justice	Police Inspector Ling Fung	
2020	The Impossible 3	So Yui	
2022	Modern Dynasty	Ma Chin Hong	

=== Film ===
Year	English title	Original title	Role	Notes
1993	Legend of the Liquid Sword	笑俠楚留香	Prince	Cameo
1993	A Warrior's Tragedy	邊城浪子	Swift Sword	
1994	Right Here Waiting...	等愛的女人	Albert	
1995	Happy Hour	歡樂時光	Cheung Pak-seung	
1995	Tragic Commitment	沒有老公的日子	Alex Wong	
1995	Highway Man	馬路英雄II非法賽車	Chiu Chi-chung	
1996	Banana Club	正牌香蕉俱樂部		
1996	Those Were the Days	四個32A和一個香蕉少年	Chan Yan-kin	
1996	To Be No. 1	金榜題名	Fei Chuen	
1996	Best of the Best	飛虎雄心2傲氣比天高	Coolman Ho	
1997	Love, Amoeba Style	愛情Amoeba	Mo Yan-dung	
1997	Theft Under the Sun	豪情蓋天	Leung Ka-ho	
1997	Option Zero	G4特工	Ben	
1998	Love and Let Love	生死戀	Cliff	
1998	The Suspect	極度重犯	Max Mak	
1998	Extreme Crisis	B計劃	Insp. Ken Cheung	
2000	Bruce Law Stunts	特技猛龍	himself	Documentary
2000	Dragon Heat	龍火		
2000	The Island Tales	有時跳舞	Han	
2000	And I Hate You So	小親親	Yuen Cheng-hau	
2000	Perfect Match	跑馬地的月光	Edmond	
2000	Twilight Garden	幽谷約會	Chi	
2001	Comic King	漫畫風雲	Yip Fung	
2001	Martial Angels	絕色神偷	Lok Chi-yang	
2001	Esprit D'Amour	陰陽愛	Joe Chan	
2001	Blue Moon	月滿抱西環	Officer Chung / Kit	
2001	Stowaway	驚天大逃亡	Chow Dai-fook	
2001	The Replacement Suspects	困獸	Rick	
2002	Reunion	手足情深	Jacky Cheung	
2002	Possessed	奪魄勾魂	James	
2005	Bar Paradise	美麗酒吧	Beauty's bodyguard	
2006	Wo Hu	臥虎	Tommy	
2006	Heavenly Mission	天行者	Lawyer Ma	
2007	Love to be Found in Nowhere	青蘋果		
2007	A Mob Story	人在江湖	Chat / Seven	
2007	Kidnap	綁架	Chow Siu-chi	
2009	The First 7th Night	頭七	Pony	
2012	Natural Born Lovers	天生愛情狂	Taylor	
2013	The Grandmaster	一代宗師	opera singer	
2013	Born to Love You	大叔，我愛你		
2013	Time Lapse			mini movie for Georgia Coffee
2014	The Fox Lover	白狐	Wang Yuanfeng	
2015	Triumph in the Skies	衝上雲霄	Jayden Koo (Captain Cool)	
2015	You Are the One			
2015	Return of the Cuckoo	十月初五的月光	Man Cho	He reprises the role of Man Cho from the TVB drama Return of the Cuckoo
2016	S Storm	S風暴	Lau Po-keung	
2017	Legend of the Ancient Sword	古剑奇谭之流月昭明	Chen Ye	
2017	Always Be With You	常在你左右	David	
2017	The House That Never Dies 2: Reawakening	京城81號2	Song Teng 宋腾 / Zhang Zhisheng 张骘生	
2018	Agent Mr Chan	棟篤特工	Chi Lam	Guest Star
2018	The Leaker	泄密者们	Lee Weng Kan	
2018	L Storm	L風暴	Lau Po-keung	
2018	Legend of the Ancient Sword	古剑奇谭之流月昭明	Chen Ye	
2018	Final Score	N/A	Agent Cho	Hollywood Debut
2019	P Storm	P風暴	Lau Po-keung	
2021	G Storm		Lau Po-keung	
2022	Death Notify		Law Fei	
2024	The Prosecutor	誤判	Au-pak-man	

=== Variety and reality show ===
Year	English title	Original title	Notes
2014–2015	2 Days & 1 Night	兩天一夜	Season 2
2015–2016	All the Way with You	一路上有你	Season 1 & 2
2016	My Hero	我的Hero	ViuTV
2019	Viva La Romance	妻子的浪漫旅行	Season 2
2021	Call Me by Fire	披荊斬棘的哥哥	Season 1
2021	Night in the Greater Bay	大灣仔的夜	
2021	Braving Life	我們的滾燙人生	
2022	Infinity and Beyond	聲生不息	Special guest
2022	Call Me by Fire	披荊斬棘	Season 2

== Awards ==
- TVB Star Award Malaysia 2013 – My Favourite TVB Actor in a Leading Role – Triumph in the Skies 2
- TVB Star Award Malaysia 2013 – My Favourite Top 15 TVB Drama Characters – Triumph in the Skies 2
- StarHub TVB Awards 2013 : My Favourite TVB Male Character – Triumph in the Skies 2
- StarHub TVB Awards 2011: Best Couple on Screen – with Myolie Wu – The Rippling Blossom
- StarHub TVB Awards 2011: My Favorite Male Character – The Rippling Blossom
- Jade Solid Gold 2009 : Best Duet Award (Silver) with Myolie Wu
- Metro Radio Hits Music Awards 2009 － Best Duet with Myolie Wu
- Metro Radio Hits Music Awards 2009 – Best Karaoke Song – 你太善良
- 粤港十年·网娱盛典颁奖晚会 2007 – 最具关注度男艺人
- CTV's 7th Lily Awards: Most Popular Actor (2007)
- Astro Awards 2005: Best Couple with Charmaine Sheh from Point of No Return
- Astro Awards 2005: Best Character Award – Chow Tin Ci / Zhou Tian Ci from Point of No Return
- Astro Awards 2005: Best Theme Song – Love Has No Dreams from Point of No Return
- 36th TVB Anniversary Awards: "My Top 12 Favorite Television Characters" – Yeung Kwong / Yang Guang from Take My Word For It (2003)
- Publication Weekly Television Awards: Most Popular Theme Song – Wishing Kwan Well from Return of the Cuckoo (2001)
- Publication Weekly Television Awards: Top 10 Television Artists – #9 (2001)
- Jade Solid Gold: Most Popular Adapted Song Performance Grand Prize – Wishing Kwan Well from Return of the Cuckoo (2001)
- Singapore's Friday Publication Weekly Student Idol Voting: Most Popular Foreign Film Actor (2000–2001)
- New City Station: Karaoke Song Grand Prize for Wishing Kwan Well from Return of the Cuckoo (2000)
- 33rd TVB Anniversary Awards: "My Favorite On-screen Couple" with Charmaine Sheh from Return of the Cuckoo (2000)
- 33rd TVB Anniversary Awards: "Top 10 My Favourite Television Characters' as Man Chor in Return of the Cuckoo (2000)
- One of the Top 10 Most Popular Artists of the Millennium (2000)
- 3rd Jade Solid Gold: Top 10 Songs of the Year – Wishing Kwan Well from Return of the Cuckoo (2000)
- Singapore Yes93: Top 3 Golden Songs – You Mei You (有没有) Have it or Not (1999)
- Singapore's Friday Publication Weekly Student Idol Voting: Voted amongst the Top 10 Most Popular Actors, Top 10 Most Popular * Film Artists, Top 10 Most Popular Foreign Film Actors, and Top 10 Most Popular Foreign Television Actors (1998–1999)
- 1st Annual Top 10 Movie Theme Songs Award: Lofty Once in a Lifetime from "To Be No. 1" (1997)
- Commercial Radio Chit Chat Pop Chart: Best New Male Singer – Silver Prize (1993)
- Hit Radio: Best New Male Singer Award (1993)
- TVB's Jade Solid Gold: Best Newcomer Award – Bronze (1992–1993)
- Metro Radio: Best Young Talent Award (1992)
- CRHK2 New Generation Show: Best Performance Award (1992)
- 1991 Jade Solid Gold: Top 10 Songs of the Year (Modern Love Story, a duet with Maple Hui)
