= Hu Bing =

Chinese actor (born 1971)

- 胡兵
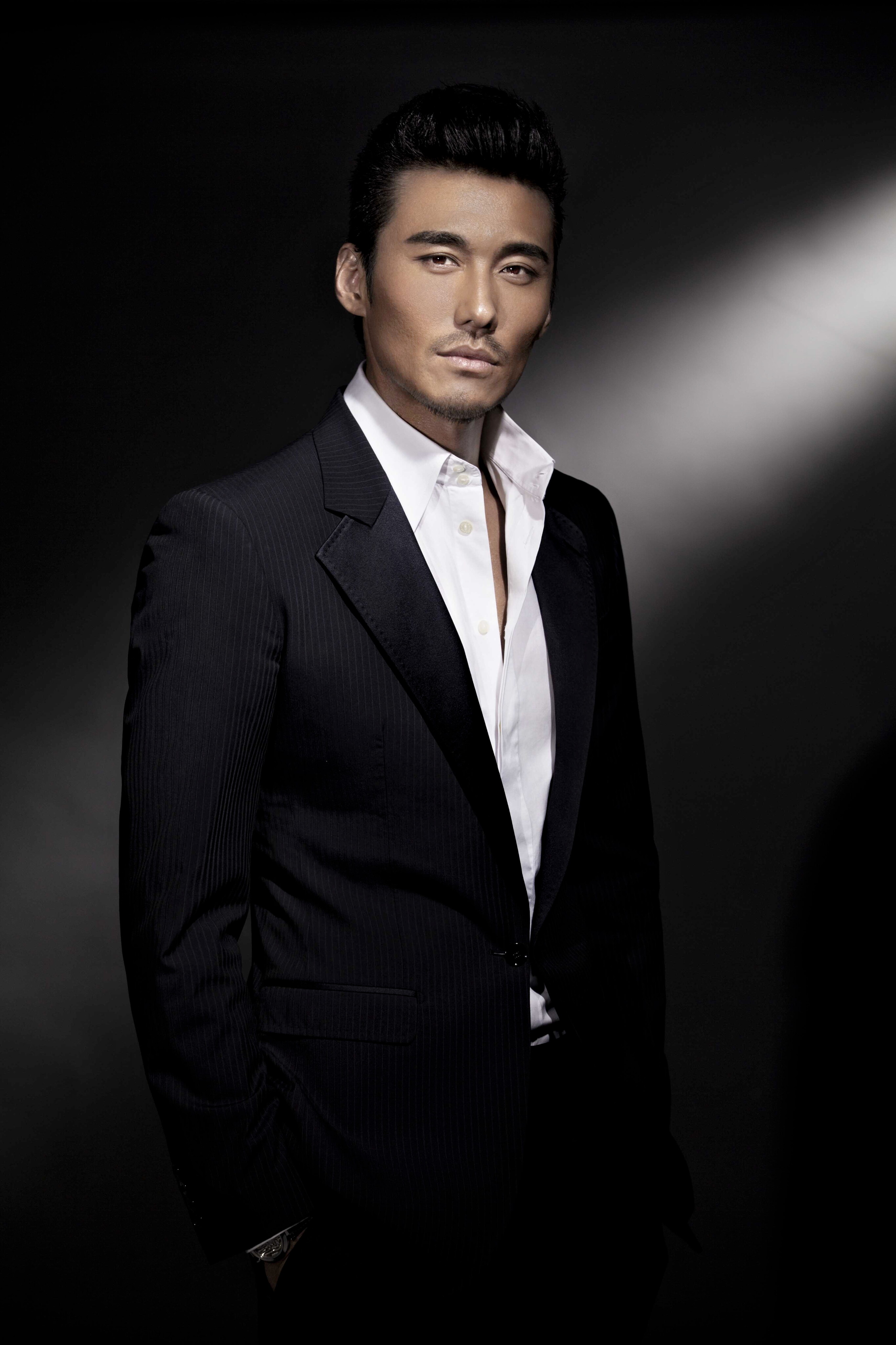
- Born: February 14, 1971 (age 55); Hangzhou, Zhejiang, China
- Occupations: Actor, model, singer, producer, host, designer
- Years active: 1991–present
- Agent: HUBING Studio
- Height: 6 ft 2.5 in (1.892 m)
- Website: http://www.hubing.cn

Hu Bing (born February 14, 1971) is a Chinese actor, model, singer, designer and producer. He started as a fashion model in 1990 and been a top male model in China for over 20 years. He won the "Top Chinese Male Model" title in 1991 and was the first Chinese male model to walk the international fashion runway. Since then, Hu has been the image for many top international fashion names such as Louis Vuitton, Dolce & Gabbana, Valentino, etc.

Hu started his transition from the fashion runway to the TV screen in 1996 and became a household name after the success of the TV drama Love Talks (1999), in which he played the male leading role. Continuously from 2000 to 2005, Hu was voted one of the four most popular young actors in China (Hu left China to further strengthen his performing aptitude in an American institute in 2005). Hu is known for his on-screen portrayals in both China and Japan as an actor, and as a fashion icon all across East Asia.

== Early life ==
Hu was born in Hangzhou, Zhejiang. His parents are from military backgrounds and he has an older brother Hu Dong (胡东), who's also an acclaimed Chinese actor, model and singer. After high school, Hu attended the Zhejiang Provincial Athletic Institute, where he majored in health education and sports psychology.

Hu started training to become a professional athlete at the age of 11. He became a member of the Zhejiang Provincial team at the age of 14 and won the Chinese National Rowing Championship in the men's single scull event at the age of 16 (the youngest national champion for the event). At age 17, he was drafted into the Chinese National Rowing Team. He was also a member of the Chinese Olympics Team during the 1988 Summer Olympics in Seoul, South Korea. Hu's professional athletic career came to an end when he suffered a back injury due to overtraining in 1990 at the age of 19, and became a fashion model soon after.

== Career ==
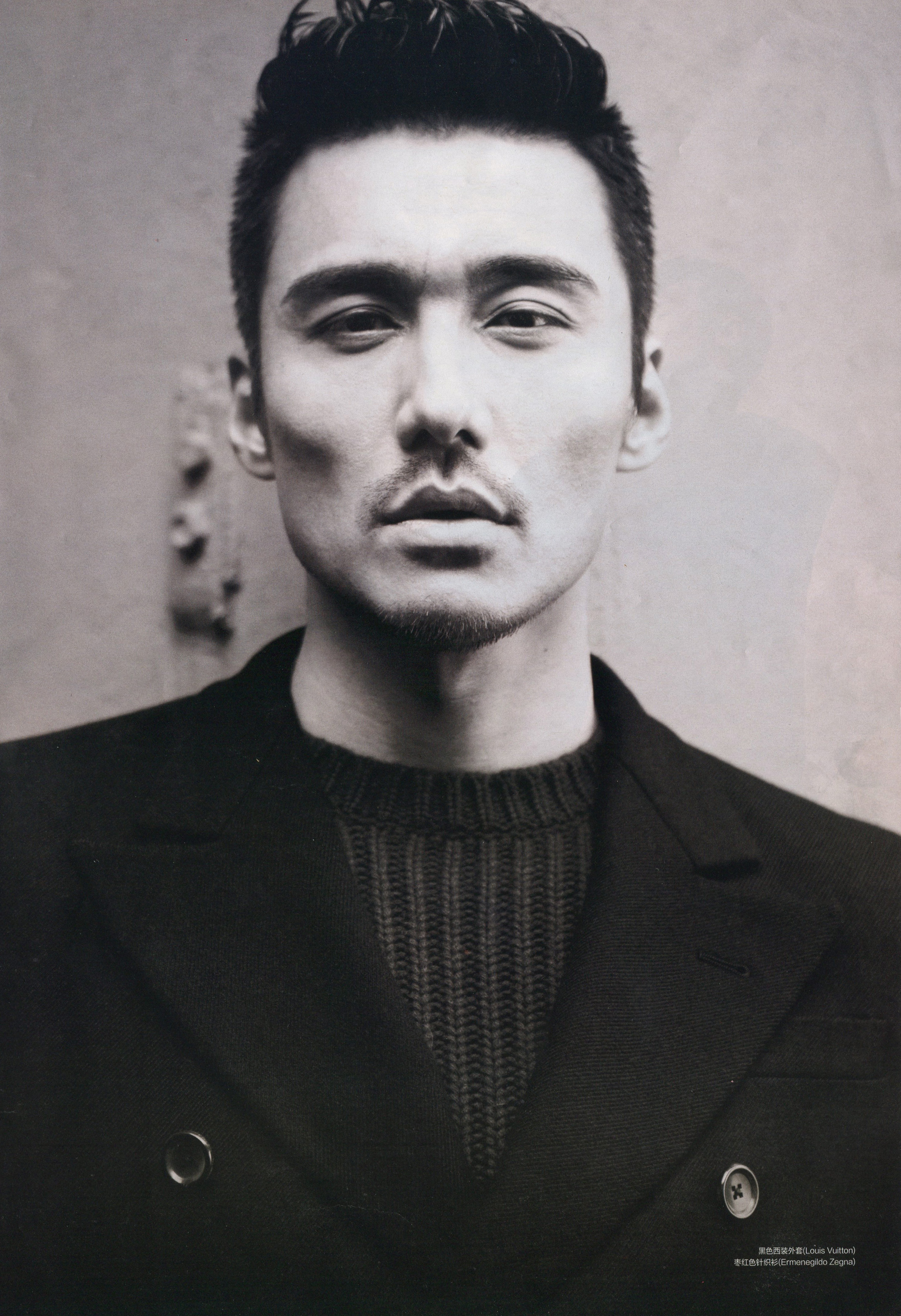
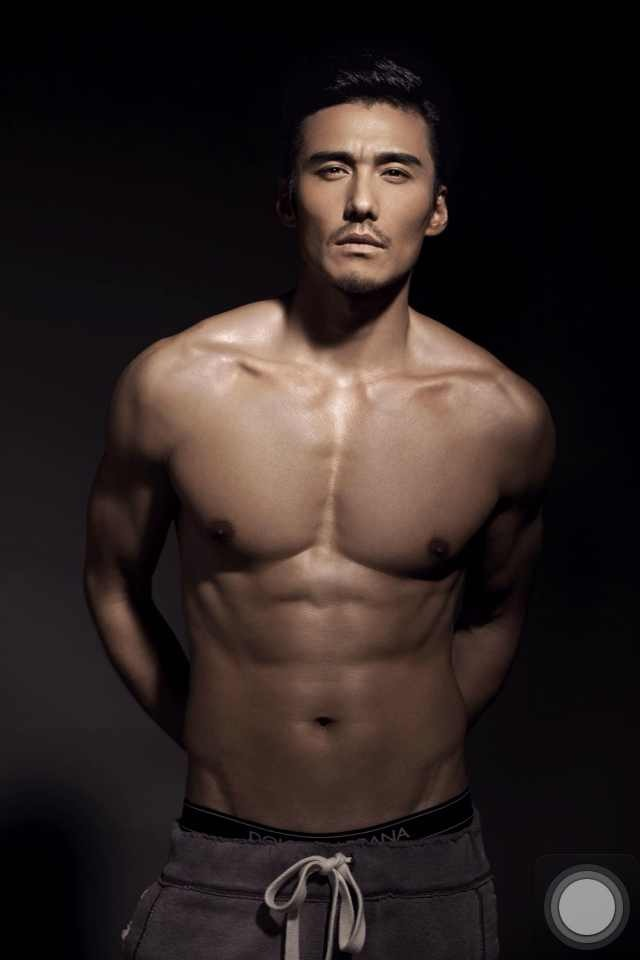
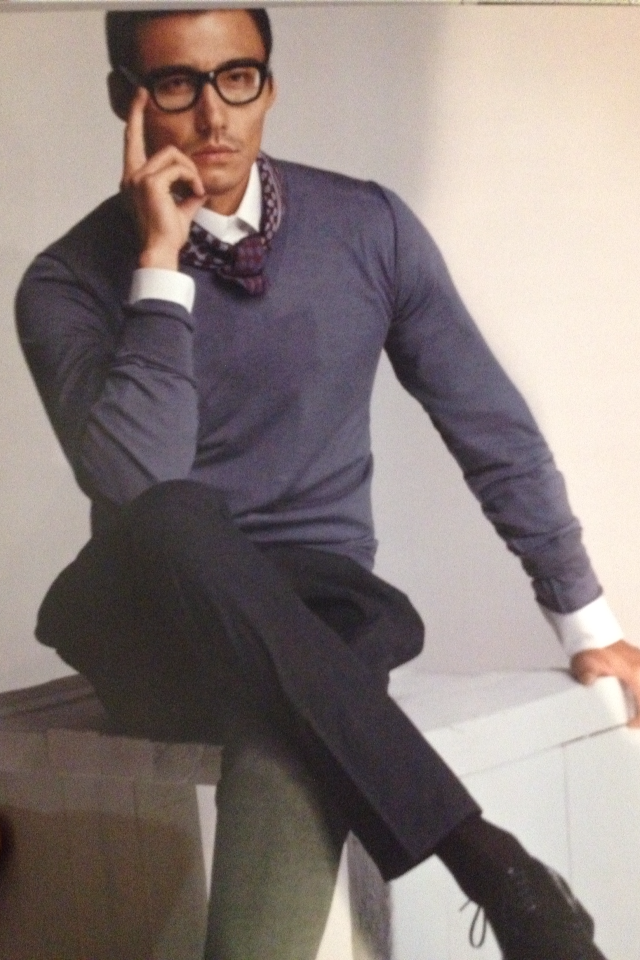
Hu Bing during various photo shoots

In 1991, Hu was invited by the Zhejiang Silk Trading Company to be the model for their men's catalog. In 1991, sponsored also by the Zhejiang Silk Trading Company, he entered the Chinese National Young Models Competition representing the province of Zhejiang and won first place. In 1992, Hu joined the Chinese Fashion Models Association and became a professional runway model. In 1993, filling in last minute for Valentino's Beijing World Trade Centre Show, Hu's outstanding performance won worldwide recognition.

With the success of his modeling career, Hu frequented major magazine covers and became the spokesperson for international luxury name brands such as Valentino, Louis Vuitton, and Toshiba in TV, billboard, and magazine ads. In late 1994, he was signed by the Hong Kong United Artists Entertainment Company who helped him publish his first album and gave him his first acting roles in the TV dramas The New York Storm (1996) and The Everlasting Dream (1997).

Hu became a Chinese household name after he starred in the hit Chinese TV drama Love Talks (1999). Hu's status was further solidified with the back-to-back successes of the TV dramas Pink Girls (2001) and Saying Goodbye (2002). Between 1997 and 2004, Hu starred in over ten TV dramas and numerous films, making him one of the highest in productivity among Chinese actors at the time.

2005 marked the peak of Hu's acting career. His honors included the "Ten Most Popular TV Stars" at the China Television Arts Festival for "Top Ten Best"; and the Best Idol Singer and Top 10 Songs at the Southeast Music Chart Awards. In late 2005 he moved to the United States and studied under a renowned American performance arts mentor who is also a mentor to many A-list Hollywood stars.

Hu's foothold in the Japanese entertainment world was planted in early 2005 as the host of a Japanese traveler's TV show. He strengthened his reputation in Japan over the years as a TV show host (also co-hosted talk show "Chinese Angel" with Japan's top female celebrity Norika Fujiwara in 2011) and the star in a series of Japanese TV dramas and films, eventually becoming a household name in Japan as well. In 2011, Hu was selected by the Oscar-winning Japanese producer Toshiaki Nakazawa to co-star alongside the world-renowned Japanese mega-star Naoto Takenaka in the film Ken and Mary (2011).

In 2008, he returned to the East Asian entertainment scene after accepting the leading role in the French-Hong Kong co-production, The Back (2010), produced by the Oscar-winning French director/producer Luc Besson and directed by the internationally renowned Chinese 6th generation director, Liu Bingjian. The film obtained critical success as it won a "Best Picture" nomination and a "Best Actor" nomination for Hu during the 2010 International Rome Film Festival.

== Filmography ==
=== Film ===
Year	English title	Chinese title	Role	Notes
1997		婚礼定在回归日		
1998	Spring Cactus	真情狂爱	Ming Dao	
2001	Stowaway	惊天大逃亡	Chi Ming	
2005	Kesennuma Legend	气仙沼传说		
2005	It Had to Be You	后备甜心	Wei Zhian	
2010	The Back	背面	Hong Tao	
2012	Harpoon	惊魂游戏	Zheng Ming	
2013	Pink Lady	粉红女郎·爱人快跑	Wang Yongcheng	
2013	Ken and Mary	雨后的夜空	Mei Li	
2013	My Boyfriends	我的男男男男朋友	Wang Yongcheng	
2014	You Are The One	恋者多喜欢	Lin Hao	
2014	Who Moved My Dream	谁动了我的梦想	Steven	
2016	Papa	洛杉矶捣蛋计划	Lin Jieming	
2017	Legend of the Naga Pearls	鲛珠传	Emperor	
2018	Air Strike	大轰炸	Hospital Dean	Special appearance
2019	The Bugle from Gutian	古田军号		

=== Television series ===
Year	English title	Chinese title	Role	Notes
1996	New York Tempest	纽约风暴	Sun Lijun	
1997	Bonds of Blood	千秋家国梦	Xu Yixian	
1997		无花的夹竹桃		
1999	Love Talks	真情告白	Gao Jian	
2000	Home	缘来一家人	Xu Jun	
2001		锵锵儿女到江湖	Shi Dawei	
2003	Pink Ladies	粉红女郎	Wang Hao	
2003	Double Sounding Cannon	双响炮	Ying Xiong	
2004	Ultimate Plan	绝对计划	Shen Cong	
2004	Special 24 Hours	非常24小时	Meng Shaojie	
2004	Fate in Tears and Laughter	啼笑因缘	Fan Jiashu	
2005	City Lady	摇摆女郎	Yu Genbao	
2006	Adeiu	真情告别	An Chen	
2006	Women Gang	女人行		
2006	My House Never Closes	我家不打烊	Guo Wenqiang	
2006	If the Moon has Eyes	如果月亮有眼睛	Di Chengxun	
2007	Super Boys & Girls	超级男女	Jin Long	
2008	OL Japan	OL日本	Li Dalong	
2009		遥远的羁绊	Liu Cheng	
2010	Unbeatable	无懈可击之美女如云	Teacher He	
2012	Come Home	亲爱的，回家	Zhu Xiao	
2012	Bandit of the Brothers	东北往事之江湖儿女	Fang Zhenyu	
2012	Drama Go! Go! Go!	姐姐立正向前走	Fu Yunkai	
2013	Women's Weapon	女人的武器	Ma Jian	
2014	If I Love You	如果我爱你	Shi Ying	
2015	Mom Go Go Go	妈妈向前冲	Zhou Kaiwen	
2015	Famous Detective Di Renjie	名侦探狄仁杰	Li Yao	
2015	Love Yunge from the Desert	大汉情缘之云中歌	Emperor Han	
2015	The Dream Come True	美梦成真	Hou Shaoyang	
2016	Ice Fantasy	幻城	Fire King	
2016	Mom Go Go Go 2	妈妈向前冲冲冲	Jiang Kaiwen	
2017	Princess Agents	楚乔传	Ma Daoya	
2017	Game of Hunting	猎场	Che Xiufeng	
2017	Stairway to Stardom	逆袭之星途璀璨	Wang Siqin	
2018	Legend of Yunxi	芸汐传	Tian Wei	
2018	Swords of Legends 2	古剑奇谭2	Yue Shaocheng	
2018	Mr. Swimmer	游泳先生	Coach	
2020	Love Advanced Customization	爱情高级定制	Su Yushan	
2020	New Horizon	壮志高飞	Ren Yuan	
2020	Legend of Fei	有翡	Li Zheng	
2021	Love Scenery	良辰美景好时光	Ding Jiayun	

== Discography ==
Year	English title	Chinese title	Notes
1999	True Colors	真本色	
2001	"Treasure Relationships"	重感情	
2005		青叶城恋呗	
2006	"All New"	2006全新胡兵	
2008	"You're With Me"	—N/a	
2008	"Unknowingly"	不知不觉	
