= Return of the Cuckoo =

- Promo image
- 十月初五的月光
- Genre: Modern drama
- Created by: Chan Bo-Wah; Chan Bo-Yin; Man Kin-Fai; Ko Wai-Man
- Starring: Julian Cheung; Charmaine Sheh; Nancy Sit; Steven Ma; Michael Tong
- Theme music composer: Cho Kyu-man
- Opening theme: "Wishing Kwan Well" by Julian Cheung
- Ending theme: "Cannot Forget" by Steven Ma
- Country of origin: Hong Kong
- Original language: Cantonese
- No. of episodes: 20

Production
- Producer: Tsui Yu-On
- Production locations: Macau; Hong Kong
- Running time: approx. 45 minutes (each)

Original release
- Network: TVB
- Release: 10 July – 4 August 2000

Return of the Cuckoo (Traditional Chinese: 十月初五的月光, literally "The Moonlight at the 5th of October [Street]", also known as 澳門街, literally "The Streets of Macao") is a 20-episode TVB drama broadcast between July 2000 and August 2000. It was originally produced to be a sitcom, however later edits made the production into a regular drama.

== Synopsis ==
As a child, Man Cho (Julian Cheung) was rendered mute as a result of the cruel actions of his mother and was adopted by the kind-hearted Ah Kiu (Nancy Sit). Man Cho grew up with Ah Kiu's daughter Kwan-Ho (Charmaine Sheh), and the two eventually develop romantic feelings for one another. Man Cho is extremely self-sacrificing, has an inferiority complex due to his disability, and therefore feels unworthy for Kwan-Ho. Ah Kiu is also against their relationship and things are further complicated when Szto Lai-Sun (Steven Ma) enters the picture after falling for Kwan-Ho too.

== Cast ==
- Julian Cheung as Man Cho 文初 (age 23)
- Charmaine Sheh as Chuk Kwan-Ho 祝君好 (age 22)
- Nancy Sit as Chu Sa-Kiu or Kiu Yee
- Steven Ma as Szto Lai-Sun
- Michael Tong as Kam Sing 金勝 (age 25)
- Sherming Yiu as Kong Yi-Man
- Johnny Ngan as Chuen Hoi-King
- Irene Wong as Wong Hoi-Lam
- Manna Chan as Man Chu Sha-Wah
- Helen Ma as Wu Tao

== Sequel & Remake ==
The sequel film Return of the Cuckoo was released in the fall of 2015. It is a continuation of the story where the drama left off.

A remake under the same title in Chinese, but titled A Love of No Words in English, was released in November 2021 on TVB starring Regina Ho and Hubert Wu. However, it immediately received criticism from audiences despite only several episodes having aired.

== Awards and achievements ==
TVB Anniversary Awards (2000)

- "Favorite On-screen Partners" (Julian Cheung and Charmaine Sheh – Man Chor and Chuk Kwan-Ho)
- "Top 10 Favorite Television Characters" (Julian Cheung – Man Chor)
- "Top 10 Favorite Television Characters" (Charmaine Sheh – Chuk Kwan-Ho)
- "Top 10 Favorite Television Characters" (Nancy Sit – Chu Sa-Kiu)
