= Lee Min-ho discography =

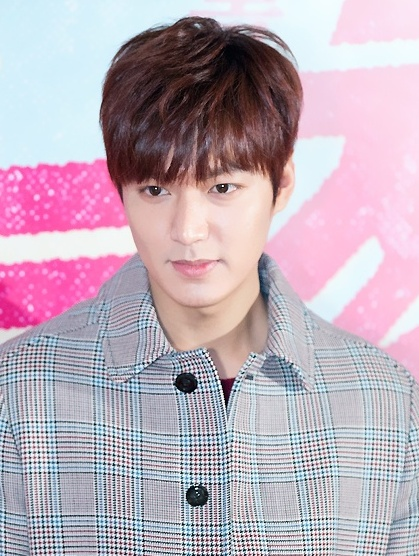

Lee Min-ho (born June 22, 1987) is a South Korean actor and singer.

== Discography ==
=== Extended plays ===
Title	Album details	Peak chart positions		Sales
Title	Album details	KOR	JPN	Sales
My Everything	Released: May 22, 2013 (KOR); Label: Starhaus Entertainment; Formats: CD, digital download; Track listing: 1. Without You; 2. Love Motion; 3. My Little Princess; 4. 너와 나 그리고 우리 (You & I); 5. 조각 (Pieces of Love); 6. My Everything [2013 re-recording]; 7. Without You [Inst.]	5	—	KOR: 16,005
My Everything	Released: May 27, 2013 (JPN); Label: Interactive Media Mix; Formats: CD, digital download; Track listing: 1. Always You; 2. Love Motion; 3. You & I 4. カケラ (Pieces of Love); 5. My Everything [Japanese ver.]; 6. Always You [Inst.]	—	11	
Song for You	Released: Oct 10, 2014 (KOR); Label: Universal Music; Formats: CD, digital download; Track listing: 1. Paradise in Love; 2. 노래할게 (Song for You); 3. Stalker; 4. Travel; 5. Burning Up; 6. 노래할게 [Inst.]	3	—	KOR: 17,414
"—" denotes album did not chart or was not released in that region.

=== Single albums ===
Title	Album details	Peak chart positions	Sales
Title	Album details	KOR	Sales
The Day	Released: November 25, 2015 (KOR); Label: Sony Music; Formats: CD, digital download; Track listing: 1. 그때처럼 (The Day); 2. 선물 (Gift); 3. 그때처럼 [Inst.]; 4. 선물 [Inst.]	6	KOR: 7,694
Always	Released: March 10, 2017 (KOR); Label: MYM Entertainment; Formats: CD, digital download; Track listing: 1. Always; 2. Always [Inst.]	5	KOR: 8,133

=== Singles ===
Title	Year	Peak chart positions		Sales	Album
Title	Year	KOR	JPN	Sales	Album
Korean
"Extreme" feat. Jessica H.O	2009	—	—		Non-album single
"My Everything"	2009	—	—		Boys Over Flowers OST (F4 Special Edition)
"Love Motion"	2013	—	—	KOR: 26,374	My Everything
"Painful Love" (아픈 사랑)	2013	16	—	KOR: 139,751	The Heirs OST Part 9
"Song for You" (노래할게)	2014	—	—		Song for You
"Thank You" (고마워요)	2015	—	—		Non-album single
Japanese
"Thank You" (サンキュー)	2015	—	11		Non-album singles
"The Day" (ザ・デイ)	2015	—	15		Non-album singles
"—" denotes single did not chart or was not released in that region. *The Gaon Digital Chart was launched in 2010.

== Videography ==
Title	Details	Track listing
Minoz Japan First Event	Release Date: March 20, 2010 (Japan); Format: 2DVD; Length: 142 min.	Track listing Disc 1: main disc [114 min.]: "Minoz Japan First Event" (2009-11-26); Disc 2: bonus disc [28 min.]: Rehearsal, Behind-The-Scenes, etc.
Lee Min Ho 2009–2010 DVD	Release Date: February 2, 2011 (Japan); Format: 2DVD; Length: 200 min.	Track listing Disc 1: 2009 [100 min.]: 1. Minoz Birthday Party Event 2009; 2. Drama Making Of; 3. Seoul Tour Making Of; 4. Japan Event Making Of; 5. CM Shoot Making Of; 6. Other Overseas Promotion Events; Disc 2: 2010 [100 min.]: 1. Minoz Birthday Party Event 2010; 2. Japan Event Making Of; 3. CM Shoot Making Of; 4. Korea Activities Making Of; 5. Other Overseas Promotion Events
Minoz Japan 2nd Event	Release Date: March 14, 2012 (Japan); Format: 1DVD; Length: 99 min.	Track listing: 1. "Minoz Japan 2nd Event" (2011-08-25) [73 min.]; 2. Making Of [26 min.]
2012 MJ 3rd Event -Lee Min Ho With Winter Symphony-	Release Date: May 15, 2013 (Japan); Format: 2DVD; Length: 131 min.	Track listing Disc 1: main disc [66 min.]: 1. Afternoon show of the fan meeting 2. Making of; Disc 2: bonus disc [65 min.]: 1. Night show of the fan meeting
Lee Min Ho – 2013 Global Tour 'My Everything' in Seoul	Release Date: Sep 9, 2013 (Korea); Format: 2DVD; Length: 118 min.	Track listing Disc 1: Fan Meeting Part 1: 1. Notice; 2. Intro Movie; 3. My Everything; 4. You & I 5. Talk 1 (Greetings); 6. Talk 1 (The Secret Profile); 7. Pieces of Love; Multi Angles: 1. My Everything; 2. You and I 3. Love Motion; Disc 2: Fan Meeting Part 2: 1. Monsterz – Hang Over; 2. Monsterz – Banana; 3. Bridge Movie; 4. Love Motion; 5. Talk 2 (Fan Event); 6. My Little Princess; 7. Talk 3 (Giveaway); 8. Without You; 9. Encore; 10. Say Yes; 11. Ending Credit; 12. Photo Gallery
Lee Min Ho 2013 Global Tour in Japan – My Everything	Release Date: Oct 16, 2013 (Japan); Format: 2DVD; Length: 135 min.	Track listing Disc 1: Yokohama Concert [79 min.]: 1. My Everything(Japanese Ver.); 2. You & I 3. Pieces of Love; 4. Love Motion; 5. My Little Princess; 6. Always You; 7. Say Yes; Disc 2: Vol. 2 [56 min.]: 1. Making of 2. Interview; 3. Yokohama Concert(night) Talk Session
Lee Min Ho – All My Life	Release Date: Apr 22, 2014 (Korea); Format: 2DVD; Length: 183 min.	Track listing Disc 1: Vol. 1 [93 min.]: 1. Prologue; 2. 2014 Lee Min Ho's Global Tour in Seoul; Disc 2: Vol. 2 [90 min.]: 1. Photo Music Video; 2. Drama Photo Sketch; 3. Jukebox (9 songs); 4. Epilogue
Lee Min Ho – Encore Concert 2014 My Everything in Japan	Release Date: Aug 8, 2014 (Korea); Format: 2DVD; Length: 147 min.	Track listing Disc 1: main disc [75 min.]: 1. 29/3 Day Performance; Disc 2: Making of [72 min.]: 1. 28/3 Performance; 2. 29/3 Evening Performance Highlights; 3. 28/3 Press Conference
