= Timeline of Mongolian history =

This is a timeline of Mongolian history, comprising important legal and territorial changes and political events in Mongolia and its predecessor states. To read about the background to these events, see History of Mongolia. See also the list of presidents of Mongolia.

== 3rd century BC ==
| Year | Date | Event |
|---|---|---|
| 215 | | Qin armies evict Xiongnu nomadic tribes from their pastures on the Yellow River in the Ordos Loop. Xiongnu leader Touman forced to flee far into the Mongolian Plateau. |
| 209 | | Modu Chanyu found the Xiongnu Empire. These nomadic peoples would inhabit the eastern Asian Steppe from the 3rd century BCE to the late 1st century CE. |
| 203 | | Xiongnu launch second war against the Yuezhi, seizing a large swath of Yuezhi territory (modern day Xinjiang). |
| 200 | | At the Battle of Baideng, Emperor Gaozu of Han was ambushed reputedly by 300,000 elite Xiongnu cavalry, only narrowly escaping capture. |

== 2nd century BC ==
| Year | Date | Event |
|---|---|---|
| 198 | | Modu Chanyu and the emperor Gaozu of China's Han dynasty sign a peace treaty, recognizing equality of the Xiongnu. |
| 176 | | Modu Chanyu leads a Xiongnu invasion of the Gansu region and soundly defeats last remnants of the Yuezhi, killing the Yuezhi king in the process and asserting their presence in the Western Regions. |
| 174 | | Death of Xiongnu leader Modu Chanyu. |
| 133 | | The Battle of Mayi, an abortive ambush operation by Emperor Wu of Han (Han Wudi) against the invading Xiongnu forces, begins a decades-long Han dynasty offensive against the nomads. |
| 119 | | The Battle of Mobei, Han forces invade the northern regions of the Gobi Desert forcing the Xiongnu to flee into Siberia. After a series of further defeats, the Xiongnu are expelled from the Ordos Desert and Qilian Mountains. |

== 1st century BC ==
| Year | Date | Event |
|---|---|---|
| 71 | | Various tribes invade the Xiongnu territory from all fronts; Wusun from the west, Dingling from the north, Wuhuan from the east, and Han forces from the south. |
| 60 | | Xiongnu civil war as factions fight for power following the death of Xulüquanqu, the 12th Chanyu |
| 53 | | The southern Xiongnu surrender and become tributaries to the Han after splitting into northern and southern dynasties. |
| 36 | | At the Battle of Zhizhi General Chen Tang and Protector General Gan Yanshou, acting without explicit permission from the Han court, kill Northern Xiongnu leader Zhizhi Chanyu at his capital city (present-day Taraz, Kazakhstan) |

== 1st century AD ==
| Year | Date | Event |
|---|---|---|
| 49 | | Tsi Yung, allied with the Wuhuan and Xianbei, attacked the northern Xiongnu kingdom. Xianbei move into Xiongnu territory. |
| 93 | | The northern Xiongnu are dispersed by the Xianbei and the Chinese during the Battle of Ikh Bayan. The last Northern Chanyu is defeated and flees over to the north west with his subjects. |

== 2nd century AD ==
| Year | Date | Event |
|---|---|---|
| 147 | | The Xianbei, who gain strength beginning from the 1st century CE, are consolidated into a state under Tanshihuai. |
| 167 | | The Xianbei successfully repel an invasion of the Han dynasty. |
| 180 | | The Xianbei conquer areas of northern China. |

== 3rd century AD ==
| Year | Date | Event |
|---|---|---|
| 235 | | The last khagan of the Xianbei, Kebineng, is assassinated by Cao Wei, successor state of the Eastern Han (25–220). The Xianbei state disintegrates into a number of smaller independent domains (Murong, Tuoba, Khitan people, Shiwei, and Rouran Khaganate). |

== 4th century AD ==
| Year | Date | Event |
|---|---|---|
| 330 | | A branch of the Xianbei, the Rouran (also known as Nirun) establish a powerful nomadic empire over modern day Mongolia, eastern Kazakhstan, part of Gansu, northern Xinjiang, Inner Mongolia, parts of Northeast China and southern Siberia. |

== 5th century AD ==
| Year | Date | Event |
|---|---|---|
| 402 | | Yujiulü Shelun assumes the title of Khagan, landmarking the establishment of the state of the Rouran Khaganate. |

== 6th century AD ==
| Year | Date | Event |
|---|---|---|
| 555 | | The Göktürks join the Western Wei, successor state of the Northern Wei, to defeat the Rouran. |
| 570 | | The Chinese Northern Qi and Northern Zhou dynasties begin paying tribute to the Göktürks. |
| 584 | | The Göktürk Empire, which stretches west to Crimea, is partitioned into Eastern and Western Turkic Khaganates. Eastern Turk Göktürks recognize Sui dynasty suzerainty. |

== 7th century AD ==
| Year | Date | Event |
|---|---|---|
| 615 | | Turkic Khaganate revolts against Emperor of Sui and besiege the command seats at present-day Daixian in Shanxi |
| 630 | 27 March | A Tang army under the command of Li Jing defeats the Eastern Turkic Khaganate under the command of Illig Qaghan at the Battle of Yinshan |
| 648 | | A reunited China—under the Tang dynasty (618–906) destroys the Eastern Türk north of the Gobi and establishes the Anbei Protectorate in the Mongolian Steppes. Uyghurs khagan are installed as Anbei protector. |
| 682 | | Ilterish Qaghan (682–91) founds the Second Turkic Khaganate by uniting the tribes and subjugating the nine Turkic tribes of the Toquz Oghuz (which included the Uyghurs) and joining with the Sir tribes, Basmyls and Karluks to the west. He would later defeat Chinese armies and raid China. |
| 691 | | Ilterish Qaghan of the Second Turkic Khaganate dies and is succeeded by his brother Qapaghan Qaghan. |
| 696 | | Qapaghan Qaghan of the Second Turkic Khaganate defeats the Khitans to the east and raids the Tang dynasty. |

== 8th century AD ==
| Year | Date | Event |
|---|---|---|
| 711 | | Qapaghan Qaghan of the Second Turkic Khaganate defeats the Turgesh |
| 742 | | The Basmyl, Uyghurs, and Karluks revolt against the Second Turkic Khaganate |
| 745 | | The Uyghurs kill the last khagan of the Göktürks, Kulunbeg, and sent his head to the Tang. |
| 756 | | Uyghur Bayanchur Khan aids Emperor Suzong of the Tang dynasty against the An Lushan rebellion. Approximately 4,000 Uyghur horsemen assisted Tang armies in retaking Chang'an and Luoyang in 757. |
| 758 | | Uyghurs destroy several northern Yenisei Kyrgyz trading outposts before slaughtering a Kyrgyz army and executing their Khan |

== 9th century AD ==
| Year | Date | Event |
|---|---|---|
| 840 | | The Tang dynasty surreptitiously encouraged the Yenisei Kirghiz and the Karluks to attack the Uyghurs and the Uyghur Khaganate fell under an invasion of the Yenisei Kirghiz |

== 10th century AD ==
| Year | Date | Event |
|---|---|---|
| 907 | | Ambagyan founds the Khitan Liao dynasty which covered a significant portion of what is now Mongolia including the basins of the three rivers Kherlen, Tuul and Orkhon. |
| 925 | | The Khitan ruled eastern Mongolia, most of Manchuria, and much of China north of the Yellow River. |
| 944 | | Emperor Taizong launches an invasion of the Jin. |
| 947 | | Khitan chieftains had established themselves as emperors of northern China. The Khitan state is renamed the Liao dynasty |
| 951 | 7 October | Emperor Shizong of Liao is murdered by a relative and is succeeded by Yelü Jing, son of Emperor Taizong of Liao, who becomes Emperor Muzong of Liao |
| 960 | February | Zhao Kuangyin declares himself Emperor Taizu of Song, replacing Later Zhou |
| 964 | | Liao dynasty assists Northern Han in repelling Song dynasty |
| 969 | 12 March | Emperor Muzong of Liao is murdered by his attendants and is succeeded by Yelü Xian, son of Emperor Shizong of Liao, who becomes Emperor Jingzong of Liao |
| 979 | | Liao dynasty attempts to assist Northern Han in repelling Song dynasty but is defeated at the Battle of Gaoliang River |
| 980 | 13 October | Emperor Jingzong of Liao dies and his son Yelü Longxu succeeds him as Emperor Shengzong of Liao; Empress Xiao Yanyan becomes regent |
| 983 | | The Liao dynasty reverts to calling itself the Khitans |
| 993 | | First conflict in the Goryeo–Khitan War: Khitans invade Goryeo and acquire nominal tributary status over Goryeo |

== 11th century AD ==
| Year | Date | Event |
|---|---|---|
| 1004 | | Emperor Shengzong of Liao conducts a full-scale invasion of the Song dynasty which ends in stalemate and the Chanyuan Treaty, an agreement to an annual payment of silk and silver from the Song to the Khitans |
| 1009 | | Empress Xiao Yanyan dies |
| 1010 | | Second conflict in the Goryeo–Khitan War: Mokjong of Goryeo is murdered by Kang Cho and the Khitans send an expedition to punish him; Kang Cho is killed |
| 1018 | | Third conflict in the Goryeo–Khitan War: Khitans invade Goryeo but are defeated |
| 1019 | | Third conflict in the Goryeo–Khitan War: Khitans prepares another army to attack Goryeo |
| 1031 | 25 June | Emperor Shengzong of Liao dies and his son Yelü Zongzhen succeeds him as Emperor Xingzong of Liao; Empress Dowager Xiao Noujin becomes regent |
| 1055 | 28 August | Emperor Xingzong of Liao dies and is succeeded by his son Yelü Hongji, who becomes Emperor Daozong of LiaoAll officials are required to wear Chinese court dress |
| 1066 | | Khitans revert to calling their state the Liao dynasty |
| 1082 | | Unusually heavy snowfall kills 70 percent of livestock and horses |
| 1093 | | Mogusi of the Zubu and the Dilie tribes of western Heilongjiang raid the Liao dynasty |

== 12th century AD ==
| Year | Date | Event |
|---|---|---|
| 1101 | 12 February | Emperor Daozong of Liao dies and his grandson Yelü Yanxi succeeds him as Emperor Tianzuo of Liao |
| 1117 | | Emperor Taizu of Jin defeats the Khitan army of the Liao dynasty |
| 1122 | | Emperor Tianzuo of Liao flees the Southern Capital and his uncle Yelü Chun is declared emperor of Northern Liao, however he dies three months later and the title is passed down to Yelü Ding, the son in hiding with his father the emperor also in hiding; real power goes to Empress Dowager Xiao Puxiannu |
| 1129 | | Yelü Dashi annexes two Jin tribes |
| 1130 | | Yelü Dashi leaves the Orkhon River with 20,000 followers and travels to the Kingdom of Qocho where the ruler welcomes him |
| 1131 | summer | Yelü Dashi attacks the Karakhanids at Kashgar but is repelled |
| 1141 | 9 September | Battle of Qatwan: Yelü Dashi annihilates the army of Ahmad Sanjar of the Seljuk Empire and vassalizes the Khwarazmian dynasty |
| 1143 | | Yelü Dashi dies and his wife Xiao Tabuyan succeeds him as regent |
| 1151 | | Yelü Yilie, son of Yelü Dashi, becomes gurkhan of the Qara Khitai |
| c. 1162 | | Temüjin (the future Genghis Khan) is born in the Khentii mountains of today's Mongolia. |
| 1186 | 7 November | Ögedei Khan, third son of Temüjin (Genghis Khan) is born. |
| 1189 | | Temüjin becomes Khan of the Khamag Mongol. |

== 13th century ==
| Year | Date | Event |
|---|---|---|
| 1205 | | Temüjin unites all nomadic tribes who settled around at Lake Baikal to China's Great Wall. |
| 1206 | | Temüjin given the title Genghis Khan (Chinggis Khaan), first Khagan (Great Khan) of the Mongol Empire. |
| 1215 | 23 September | Kublai Khan, son of Tolui and grandson of Genghis Khan, is born. |
| 1227 | 18 August | Genghis Khan, 1st Khagan of the Mongol Empire, dies in Western Xia during the fall of Yinchuan aged c. 65. |
| 1229 | 13 September | Ögedei Khan, third son of Genghis Khan, becomes second Khagan of the Mongol Empire. |
| 1241 | 11 December | Ögedei Khan, second Khagan of the Mongol Empire, dies aged 55. |
| 1243 | | Zhenjin, second son of Kublai Khan and later founder of the Yuan dynasty, is born. |
| 1246 | 24 August | Güyük Khan, eldest son of Ögedei Khan and grandson of Genghis Khan, becomes third Khagan of the Mongol Empire. |
| 1248 | 20 April | Güyük Khan, third Khagan of the Mongol Empire, dies aged 42. |
| 1251 | 1 July | Möngke Khan, eldest son of Tolui and grandson of Genghis Khan, becomes fourth Khagan of the Mongol Empire. |
| 1259 | 11 August | Möngke Khan, fourth Khagan of the Mongol Empire, dies aged 50. |
| 1260 | 5 May | Kublai Khan, son of Tolui and grandson of Genghis Khan, becomes fifth Khagan of the Mongol Empire. However, the Toluid Civil War begins as various members of the Tolui family line fight for the title of Khagan resulting in the division of the Mongol Empire. |
| 1268 | | The Kaidu–Kublai war breaks out, which lasts until 1301 and deepens the fragmentation of the Mongol Empire. All later Khagans of the Mongol Empire were nominal due to the empire's division. |
| 1269 | | Birth of the 'Phags-pa script, designed by Drogön Chögyal Phagpa for Kublai Khan. |
| 1271 | | Kublai Khan officially proclaims the founding of the Yuan dynasty with himself as first emperor. Khanbaliq (modern Beijing) named the dynasty's capital. |
| 1273 | | Zhenjin designated Crown Prince by Kublai Khan. |
| 1294 | 18 February | Death of Kublai Khan (aged 78). By this time the Mongol Empire had already fractured into four khanates: the Yuan dynasty based in China, the Golden Horde based in Russia, the Chagatai Khanate based in Central Asia, and the Ilkhanate based in Iran, although the Yuan emperors held the nominal title of Khagan. |
| 1294 | 10 May | Temür Khan, son of Crown Prince Zhenjin and grandson of Kublai Khan, becomes sixth Khagan of the Mongol Empire and second emperor of the Mongol-led Yuan dynasty. |
| 1295 | | Enthronement of Ilkhan Ghazan. Islamization of the Ilkhanate. |

== 14th century ==
| Year | Date | Event |
|---|---|---|
| 1304 | | A peace among the Mongol khanates establishes the nominal supremacy of the Yuan dynasty over the three western khanates (the Golden Horde, the Chagatai Khanate and the Ilkhanate). However, the peace itself was short-lived and the war soon resumed. |
| 1307 | 21 June | With the death of Temür Khan (aged 41), Külüg Khan, first son of Darmabala and Dagi of the Khunggirad clan, and a great-grandson of Kublai Khan, becomes seventh Khagan of the Mongol Empire and third Emperor of the Yuan dynasty. |
| 1311 | 7 April | Külüg Khan dies (aged 29). Ayurbarwada Buyantu Khan, second son of Darmabala and Dagi of the Khunggirat, and a great-grandson of Kublai Khan, becomes eighth Khagan of the Mongol Empire and fourth Emperor of the Yuan dynasty. |
| 1313 | | Enthronement of Öz Beg Khan. Islamization of the Golden Horde. |
| 1315 | | Revival of the imperial examination system within the Yuan dynasty under Ayurbarwada Buyantu Khan. |
| 1320 | 19 April | Ayurbarwada Buyantu Khan dies (aged 34), Gegeen Khan, eldest son of Ayurbarwada Buyantu Khan and Radnashiri, becomes ninth Khagan of the Mongol Empire and fifth Emperor of the Yuan dynasty. |
| 1323 | 4 October | Death of Gegeen Khan (aged 20). Yesün Temür, son of Gammala, grandson of Zhenjin and great-grandson of Kublai Khan, becomes tenth Khagan of the Mongol Empire and sixth Emperor of the Yuan dynasty. |
| 1328 | October | With the death of Yesün Temür (aged 34), Ragibagh Khan, eldest son of Yesün Temür, becomes 11th Khagan of the Mongol Empire at the age of 7-8 and designated seventh Emperor of the Yuan dynasty before being deposed in a coup before his succession. |
| 1328 | 16 October | Jayaatu Khan Tugh Temür, second son of Khayishan, becomes 12th Khagan of the Mongol Empire and eighth Emperor of the Yuan dynasty. The War of the Two Capitals begins. His forces defeated, Ragibagh Khan disappears or dies at the age of 7–8, possibly murdered. |
| 1329 | 27 February | Jayaatu Khan Tugh Temür abdicates and his elder brother Khutughtu Khan Kusala becomes 13th Khagan of the Mongol Empire and ninth Emperor of the Yuan dynasty. However, he dies on August 30 at age 28, four days after a banquet with brother Jayaatu Khan Tugh Temür, presumed to have been poisoned. Jayaatu Khan Tugh Temür regaines the throne on September 8. |
| 1332 | 23 October | With the death of Jayaatu Khan Tugh Temür (aged 28), Rinchinbal Khan, second son of Khutughtu Khan Kusala, becomes 14th Khagan of the Mongol Empire and tenth Emperor of the Yuan dynasty at the age of six. |
| 1333 | 19 July | Rinchinbal Khan dies nine months later (aged 6), Toghon Temür, (1320–1370) eldest son of Khutughtu Khan Kusala and older brother of Rinchinbal, becomes 15th Khagan of the Mongol Empire and eleventh Emperor of the Yuan dynasty. |
| 1335 | | Disintegration of the Ilkhanate after the death of Ilkhan Abu Sa'id. |
| 1368 | 14 September | Toghon Temür flees Beijing for Shangdu in advance of approaching Ming dynasty forces. Yuan dynasty falls. The remnants of the Yuan known as the Northern Yuan dynasty continue in Mongolia. |
| 1370 | | Biligtü Khan Ayushiridara (1340–1378), son of Toghon Temür, is declared Khan of Mongolia at Karakorum. Timur (Tamerlane) gains control of the western Chagatai Khanate. |
| 1378 | | Uskhal Khan Tögüs Temür (1342–1388) succeeds his brother Ayuushridar as Khan of Mongolia. |
| 1380 | | The Golden Horde is defeated at the Battle of Kulikovo. Karakorum is destroyed by Chinese troops. |
| 1388 | | Uskhal Khan Tögüs Temür is murdered by an ally of the Oirats, thus launching the Oirat-Mongol wars in Northern Yuan dynasty. Jorightu Khan Yesüder (1358–1391) becomes Khan of a fractured and diminished Mongol Khanate. |
| 1394 | | Elbeg Nigülesügchi Khan (1361–1399) overthrew Engke Khan from the House of Ariq Böke succeeds as Khan of the Mongols. |
| 1395 | | Timur invades the Golden Horde and sacks Saray and Astrakhan. |
| 1399 | | Elbeg Nigülesügchi Khagan is defeated by the Four Oirats and killed by their leaders, Ugetchi Khashikha and Batula. |

== 15th century ==
| Year | Date | Event |
|---|---|---|
| 1405 | | Timur dies of illness at Farab (present day Kazakhstan) while preparing for war against Ming China. |
| 1408 | | Öljei Temür Khan (1379–1412) succeeds his father Elbeg Nigülesügchi Khan and older brother Gün Temür Khan as Khan of the Yuan dynasty. |
| 1415 | | Oirat nobles place Oyiradai (died 1425) on the throne of Khagan of the Mongol Khan of the Northern Yuan dynasty following the death of Delbeg Khan |
| 1425 | | Adai Khan (1390–1438) assumes throne of Northern Yuan dynasty, unifies both the central and eastern Mongol territories but then suffers major defeats by Oirats in 1430 and 1434. |
| 1433 | | Oirats crown Toghtoa Bukha (Taisun Khan) as Khagan of the Northern Yuan. He later proclaims himself of Khagan of the Great Yuan enraging the Ming dynasty. |
| 1449 | | Esen Taishi (Taisun Khan's military commander and later successor as Khan) captures the Zhentong Emperor of the Ming dynasty at the Battle of Tumu Fortress and lays siege to Beijing, but is pushed back. |
| 1473 | | The Ming begin construction of the Great Wall at the southern edge of the Ordos Desert to contain resurgent Mongol tribes. |
| 1480 | | Madukhai Khatun, widow of the previous Chinggisid khan, marries Batu-Möngke Dayan Khan who defeats the Oirats, beginning a Chinggisid revival in Mongolia. The Great Horde's attempt to invade Muscovy failed. Their leader Akhmat Khan dies. |

== 16th century ==
| Year | Date | Event |
|---|---|---|
| 1510 | | Dayan Khan defeats the Ordos and Tümed Mongols at the Battle of Dalan Terigün (Inner Mongolia), reunifying the Six Tümens of the Mongols. |
| 1513 | | Dayan Khan launches successive invasions of China that continue through 1526 and include an unsuccessful assault on Beijing in 1517 |
| 1542 | | Following his brother's death in 1542, Altan Khan (grandson of Dayan Khan) becomes the de facto leader of the whole of the "Right Wing" (western Inner Mongolia and Ordos) and is given the title, "Tüsheet Sechen Khan." |
| 1550 | | Altan Khan launches large scale incursions into Ming territory, surrounds Beijing. |
| 1551 | | Altan Khan and the Ming strike accords on peace and border trade. |
| 1571 | | Altan Khan founds the city of Guihua or Köke Khota (Hohhot, meaning "The Blue City"), now the capital of the Inner Mongolia Autonomous Region of the People's Republic of China. |
| 1577 | | Altan Khan meets Sodnam Gyatso in northeast Tibet and bestows on him the Mongolian title "Dalai Lama". The Mongols’ “Second Conversion” to Buddhism begins |
| 1585 | | Abtai Sain Khan of the Tüsheet Khanate and nephew of Altan Khan founds Erdene Zuu Monastery, the first Buddhist monastery in Mongolia, adjacent to the ancient Mongol capital of Karakorum |

== 17th century ==
| Year | Date | Event |
|---|---|---|
| 1601 | | Yonten Gyatso, great-grandson of Altan Khan, becomes the 4th Dalai Lama in Lhasa, Tibet. |
| 1604 | | Ligdan Khan becomes ruler of the northern Yuan. |
| 1619 | | Several Mongol tribes defect to the Qing due to Ligdan Khan's oppressive rule. |
| 1632 | | Ligdan Khan flees to Tibet to evade the Manchus and conquer the Gelug. |
| 1634 | | Ligdan Khan dies at Qinghai Lake. |
| 1640 | | Zanabazar, four-year-old son of the Tüsheet Khan of the Khalkha, is recognized as the first Jebtsundamba Khutughtu. |
| 1642 | | Establishment of the Khoshut Khanate in the Tibetan Plateau by Güshi Khan. |
| 1661 | | Irkutsk fort founded. |
| 1671 | | Galdan Boshigt becomes leader of the western Dzungar Khanate. |
| 1685 | | Galdan Khan founds the town of Khovd. |
| 1687 | | Outbreak of the decades-long Dzungar–Qing War between the Dzungar Khanate and Khalkha-Mongols / Qing dynasty. |
| 1688 | | The Dzungars invade Khalkha and force Khalkha nobility to flee to Inner Mongolia. |
| 1691 | | Khalkha nobles pledge fealty to the Kangxi Emperor of the Qing dynasty. |
| 1696 | | The Qing dynasty seizes de facto control of Khalkha by defeating the Dzungars in the Battle of Jao Modo. |

== 18th century ==
| Year | Date | Event |
|---|---|---|
| 1705 | | The Khoshut Lha-bzang Khan deposes the Sixth Dalai Lama in Tibet and kills the regent Sangs-rgyas rGya-mtsho. |
| 1709 | | Khalkha jirum (Khalkha regulations) replaces the Mongol-Oirat Code among the Khalkha Mongols. |
| 1717 | | Acting on an appeal by the Tibetan monasteries, the Dzungar army occupies Lhasa and kills The Khoshut Lha-bzang Khan. |
| 1718 | | The Qing armies establish a garrison and military farm near modern Khovd city in western Mongolia. |
| 1720 | | Qing dynasty's Kangxi Emperor drives Dzungar forces from Tibet. |
| 1723 | | Death of Zanabazar. Upper Mongols under rule of the prince Lubsan Danzan revolt against the Qing but are defeated. |
| 1727 | | Kyakhta Treaty defines Russo-Qing frontier and divides the Buriats under Russia from the Khalkha Mongols under the Qing. |
| 1752 | | Dawaachi and Amursanaa overthrow the Dzungar ruler in Xinjiang; Dawaachi becomes new Khong Tayiji (ruler). |
| 1755 | | The Qing armies occupy Dzungaria in Xinjiang. |
| 1756 | | Chingünjav and Amursana lead failed rebellions which ended in the destruction of the Dzungars by the Qing dynasty. |
| 1758 | | Third Jebtsundamba Khutuktu identified in Tibet (first outside of Mongolia) |
| 1779 | | Nom-un Yekhe Khüriye, the great monastery of the Jebtsundamba Khutuktus, finally settles at the present location of Ulaanbaatar in Mongolia. |
| 1789 | | Qing law replaces the native code, Khalkha jirum. |

== 19th century ==
| Year | Date | Event |
|---|---|---|
| 1809 | | The 5th Jebtsundamba Khutuktu orders construction of Gandantegchinlen (Gandan) Monastery in Ikh Khuree. |
| 1811 | | First tsam religious dances performed in Ikh Khuree |
| 1822 | | Russian statesman Mikhail Speransky reforms administration of the Buriats and other Indigenous peoples of Siberia. |
| 1833 | | Opening of the Russian-Mongol school in Kyakhta |
| 1836 | | The Jebtsundamba Khutuktu relocates from east Khüriye (now central Ulaanbaatar) to Gandantegchinlen (Gandan) Monastery to avoid Chinese merchants. |
| 1838 | | Completion of Gandantegchinlen (Gandan) Monastery in Ikh Khuree |
| 1846 | | The Buriat Cossack Dorzhi Banzarov becomes first person of Mongol ancestry to earn a European Ph.D. at University of Kazan in Russia. |
| 1861 | | Russian Consul takes up residence in Ikh Khuree |
| 1869 | | Agvaanl Uvsanchoijinyam Danzan Vanchüg is born in Lithang, Kham. He will later be formally installed as the Bogd Khan of the new Mongolian state |
| 1880 | | Anti-Manchu mutiny by Uliastai garrison |
| 1891 | | Chinese rebels of the Jindandao (Way of the Golden Pill) sect launch massive pogroms against Mongols in southeastern Inner Mongolia. |
| 1892 | | Agreement to build a telegraph line from Russia to China via Ikh Khuree. Construction of Trans-Siberian Railway begins. |

== 20th century ==
| Year | Date | Event |
|---|---|---|
| 1907 | | The Qing government implemented sinification policies. |
| 1911 | 1 December | Outer Mongolia declared independence from the Qing dynasty under Bogd Khan. |
| 1911 | 29 December | The Bogdo Khanate of Mongolia was proclaimed and Bogd Khan enthroned. |
| 1912 | 3 November | The Russian Empire recognized Mongolian independence and the rule of Bogd Khan. |
| 1913 | 11 November | Mongolia and Tibet concluded treaty on mutual recognition and mutual assistance. |
| 1915 | 29 May | Russia, China and Mongolia signed a treaty at Kyakhta under which China was recognized as sovereign over an autonomous Mongolia. |
| 1919 | October | Outer Mongolia was occupied by the Republic of China. |
| 1920 | 25 June | The Mongolian People's Party was formed between two secret revolutionary groups in occupied Niislel Khüree. |
| 1921 | February | Roman von Ungern-Sternberg drove Chinese troops out of Niislel Khüree. |
| 1921 | 22 February | All remaining Chinese troops were defeated by Ungern and driven from Mongolia, allowing the reassertion of Mongolian independence and the restoration of the Bogd Khanate of Mongolia. |
| 1921 | 13 March | The People's Provisional Government of seven men was formed in Soviet Russia. |
| 1921 | 18 March | People's Revolution of 1921: Revolutionary guerrillas headed by Damdin Sükhbaatar, with the assistance of Red Army troops, defeated the Chinese garrison in Kyakhta. |
| 1921 | July | People's Revolution of 1921: The Russian Red Army, with the support of Damdin Sükhbaatar, defeated the forces of Ungern-Sternberg. |
| 1921 | 11 July | A revolutionary government led by Dogsomyn Bodoo was officially established; the Bogd Khan was installed as a constitutional monarch. |
| 1921 | 20 August | Ungern-Sternberg was captured by a Soviet detachment. |
| 1921 | 15 September | The show trial of Ungern sentenced him to execution by firing squad. Ungern was shot the following night. |
| 1922 | 31 August | High-ranking figures, accused of anti-revolutionary conspiracy by Soliin Danzan, were shot dead. Notable victims included Dogsomyn Bodoo, Dambyn Chagdarjav, and Ja Lama. |
| 1923 | 20 February | Revolutionary commander Damdin Sükhbaatar mysteriously passed away. Rumours allege he was poisoned by Khorloogiin Choibalsan. |
| 1924 | 20 May | Death of the Bogd Khan. |
| 1924 | 26 November | After the Bogd Khan's passing, the 1924 Constitution was passed by the first State Great Khural. Subsequently, the Mongolian People's Republic was officially declared in Outer Mongolia. |
| 1928 | | Collectivization began. |
| 1932 | April–October | 1932 armed uprising in Mongolia: The failure of collectivization led to widespread uprisings and a temporary thaw. |
| 1936 | | Prince Demchugdongrub formed the Mongol Military Government, a non-Communist state independent from China, in Inner Mongolia. |
| 1937 | | The Mongol Military Government was renamed the Mongol United Autonomous Government. |
| 1937 | September | Stalinist purges in Mongolia: A Stalinist terror began which would lead to the deaths of more than thirty thousand people in the Mongolian People's Republic. |
| 1939 | April | Stalinist purges in Mongolia: The terror ended. |
| 1939 | May | Battle of Khalkhyn Gol: Large scale fighting took place between Japanese and joint Soviet-Mongolian forces along Khalkhyn Gol on the border between Mongolia and Manchuria. |
| 1939 | 16 September | Battle of Khalkhyn Gol: The battle ended in a Japanese defeat. A truce was negotiated between Japan and the Soviet Union. |
| 1941 | | The Mongol United Autonomous Government was renamed the Mongolian Autonomous Federation, or Mengjiang. |
| 1945 | August | The Republic of China requested Soviet help in the war against Japan, and offered recognition of the independence of Outer Mongolia in exchange according to the Sino-Soviet Treaty of Friendship and Alliance. |
| 1945 | August | The Mongolian People's Republic declared war on Japan, one day after the Soviet Union, and began to liberate Southern Mongolia from China and Japan. |
| 1945 | October | A 1945 plebiscite yielded a 100% pro-independence vote. |
| 1946 | January | The Chinese government recognized the independence of Mongolian People's Republic. |
| 1949 | 6 October | The newly established People's Republic of China recognized Mongolia and agreed to establish diplomatic relations. |
| 1950 | | Herds were successfully collectivized. |
| 1952 | | The Republic of China (ROC) on Taiwan renounced the Sino-Soviet Treaty of Friendship and Alliance. |
| 1955 | | The ROC blocked the accession of the Mongolian People's Republic's entry to the United Nations. |
| 1961 | 23 October | The Mongolian People's Republic was admitted to the United Nations. |
| 1961 | | The Trans-Mongolian Railway was finished. |
| 1962 | | Mongolia became a member of the Comecon. |
| 1962 | | Sino-Soviet split: The MPRP leadership sided with the Soviet Union in a falling-out with China. |
| 1965 | | Yumjaagiin Tsedenbal purged the intelligentsia. |
| 1969 | | Sino-Soviet split: The Soviet Union stationed a large army on Mongolian territory in response to threats of Chinese aggression. |
| 1981 | 22 March | Jügderdemidiin Gürragchaa became the first Mongolian in space as part of Soyuz 39. |
| 1984 | 23 August | Tsedenbal was ousted from all positions by the Politburo. |
| 1987 | 27 January | Mongolia established diplomatic relations with the United States. |
| 1989 | December | The first popular reform demonstrations took place, sparking the Democratic Revolution of 1990; the Mongolian Democratic Union (MDU) was organized and established. |
| 1990 | January | Large-scale pro-democracy demonstrations were held in sub-zero weather. |
| 1990 | 2 March | Mongolia and the Soviet Union announced that all Soviet troops would be withdrawn from Mongolia by 1992. |
| 1990 | 7 March | The MDU launched a mass hunger strike demanding the resignation of Jambyn Batmönkh and the Politburo. |
| 1990 | 8-9 March | The Politburo of the Central Committee of the MPRP and Batmönkh announced their resignation. |
| 1990 | May | The constitution was amended to provide for a multi-party system and new elections. |
| 1990 | 29 July | The first democratic elections were held. The former sole legal MPRP won 343 out of 430 seats. Four other new parties were elected into parliament. |
| 1990 | 3 September | The first democratically elected People's Great Khural took office; the office of the President of the Mongolian People's Republic was created with then-chairman of the presidium Punsalmaagiin Ochirbat as its first officeholder. |
| 1990 | 13 September | The first session of the newly established State Little Khural, the lower house of the People's Great Khural, was convened with 50 members. The office of the Vice President of the Mongolian People's Republic was created with Little Khural chairman Radnaasümbereliin Gonchigdorj as its first and only officeholder. |
| 1992 | 13 January | A new constitution went into effect, effectively dissolving the Mongolian People's Republic. |
| 1992 | 8 April | A new election law was passed. |
| 1992 | 28 June | An election was held for the first unicameral legislature, the State Great Khural. The MPRP won a supermajority of 60 seats. |
| 1992 | 29 July | The State Little Khural and the office of the Vice President was dissolved as the first session of the State Great Khural convened. |
| 1993 | 6 June | The first direct presidential election took place. Opposition candidate Punsalmaagiin Ochirbat, a former MPRP member, won. |
| 1996 | 30 June | The opposition Democratic Union Coalition (DUC) won the 1996 parliamentary election. Subsequently, the first non-Communist government was elected into office. |
| 1996 | 18 July | Mendsaikhany Enkhsaikhan became the first Democratic prime minister. |
| 1997 | 18 May | MPRP candidate Natsagiin Bagabandi defeated incumbent president and DUC candidate Punsalmaagiin Ochirbat in the 1997 presidential election. |
| 1998 | April | Prime Minister Enkhsaikhan was forced to resign due to internal party pressure. |
| 1998 | 23 April | DUC chairman Tsakhiagiin Elbegdorj was elected (61–6) to succeed Enkhsaikhan. |
| 1998 | 2 October | Sanjaasürengiin Zorig, Minister of Infrastructure and one of the Democratic leaders of the 1990 revolution, was murdered in his home. |
| 1998 | 9 December | Janlavyn Narantsatsralt was nominated by the State Great Khural and accepted by president Bagabandi as the next prime minister. |
| 1999 | 22 July | Prime Minister Narantsatsralt was forced to resign after a controversial letter to the Russian Federation. Rinchinnyamyn Amarjargal was nominated to succeed Narantsatsralt and served until the 2000 election. |
| 2000 | 2 July | The MPRP won 72 out of 76 seats in the State Great Khural; a new government was formed by Prime Minister and MPRP chairman Nambaryn Enkhbayar. The DUC witnessed a major electoral wipeout, winning only a single seat. |
| 2000 | 6 December | The Democratic Party of Mongolia was founded after the merger of five former member parties of the now-dissolved DUC. |

== 21st century ==
| Year | Date | Event |
|---|---|---|
| 2001 | 20 May | Incumbent Bagabandi was re-elected as the 2nd President of Mongolia in the 2001 presidential election. |
| 2003 | | Mongolian troops begin taking part in peace keeping operations in Afghanistan, Iraq and Sudan. |
| 2004 | | An election resulted in a draw. A coalition was formed between the MPRP and other parties which was headed by Tsakhiagiin Elbegdorj. |
| 2006 | January | The governing coalition was dissolved by the MPRP. |
| 2006 | 25 January | A new coalition between the MPRP and smaller parties and defectors was formed under Miyeegombyn Enkhbold. |
| 2007 | October | The governing coalition was led by the MPRP and replaced by a coalition headed by Sanjiin Bayar. |
| 2009 | June | Tsakhiagiin Elbegdorj from the Democratic Party was selected 3rd President of Mongolia. |
| 2009 | October | Sanjaagiin Bayar resigned from Primer Ministership due to declining health conditions and was replaced with Sükhbaataryn Batbold. |
| 2010 | November | MPRP restored its 1921 name, Mongolian People's Party (MPP), during its 26th Party Congress. |
| 2012 | August | After the 2012 parliamentary election, a coalition headed by Norovyn Altankhuyag from Democratic party was formed. |
| 2013 | June | Tsakhiagiin Elbegdorj from Democratic Party, was re-elected in the 2013 presidential election. |
| 2014 | 5 November | Altankhuyag lost a motion of no confidence (36–30), thereby resigned as prime minister and Democratic party chairman |
| 2014 | 21 November | Chimediin Saikhanbileg succeeded Altankhuyag as next prime minister, Zandaakhüügiin Enkhbold succeeded as Democratic party chairman |
| 2016 | 29 June | In the 2016 parliamentary election, the MPP won a supermajority of 65 seats in the State Great Khural. |
| 2016 | July | Party chairman Miyeegombyn Enkhbold was elected the next chairman of the State Great Khural, whilst Jargaltulgyn Erdenebat was appointed as the next prime minister during the first parliamentary session. |
| 2017 | 26 June | During the 2017 presidential election |
| 2017 | September | Erdenebat was voted out of office for alleged incompetence and corruption. |
| 2017 | October | Deputy Prime Minister Ukhnaagiin Khürelsükh was nominated and appointed as Erdenebat's successor. |
| 2017 | November | Khürelsükh succeeded speaker Enkhbold as the next MPP chairman. |

== See also ==
- History of Mongolia
- Proto-Mongols
- List of Mongol states
- List of Mongol rulers
- List of heads of state of Mongolia
- List of historical cities and towns of Mongolia
- Mongolian nobility
- Timeline of the Ilkhanate

== Bibliography ==
- Biran, Michal (2005). The Empire of the Qara Khitai in Eurasian History: Between China and the Islamic World. Cambridge Studies in Islamic Civilization. Cambridge, England: Cambridge University Press. ISBN 0521842263.
- Twitchett, Denis (1994). The Cambridge History of China, Volume 6, Alien Regime and Border States, 907-1368. Cambridge: Cambridge University Press. ISBN 0521243319.
- Xiong, Victor Cunrui (2009). Historical Dictionary of Medieval China. United States of America: Scarecrow Press, Inc. ISBN 978-0810860537.
