= Han Derang =

Liao dynasty politician

Han Derang 韓德讓
- Born: 941; Liao dynasty
- Died: 1011; Liao dynasty
- Burial place: Northwest from Hongjia Village, Futun Street, Beizhen city, Liaoning province, Northeast China
- Other names: Yelü Longyun (耶律隆運; Khitan name); Wénzhōng (文忠; Posthumous name)
- Occupations: Military officer (979–?); Politician; Prime Minister; Chancellor (994–1011)
- Years active: 979–1011
- Known for: The Founder of Changli County in Hebei, China (昌黎郡開國公).; Win in against the Northern Song dynasty's invasion in Youdu, Nanjing.; Defeated Cao Bin (曹彬) and Mi Xin (米信)'s troops in their Expedition to Northern Song dynasty.
- Title: Duke of Chu (楚國公); King of Chu (楚王); King of Qi; King of Jin (晉國王)
- Parents: Han Kuangsi (韓匡嗣; Han Derang was his fourth son) (father); Lady Xiao (蕭氏) (mother)
- Family: Han Zhigu (grandfather)

Chinese name
- Traditional Chinese: 韓德讓
- Simplified Chinese: 韩德让
Transcriptions
Standard Mandarin
- Hanyu Pinyin: Hán Déràng

Korean name
- Hangul: 한덕양
- Hanja: 韓德讓
- RR: Han Deokyang
- MR: Han Tŏgyang

Han Derang (simplified Chinese: 韩德让; traditional Chinese: 韓德讓; pinyin: Hán Déràng; 941–1011), known for his Khitan name, Yelü Longyun (Chinese: 耶律隆运), Xingning (Chinese: 兴宁), or Yaoge (Chinese: 尧哥) was a Chinese politician. He served as the prime minister of the Liao dynasty during the reign of Empress Xiao Chuo. He was a native of Hebei Yutian (祖籍河北玉田) and born into the Shihou family.

== Early life ==
Han Derang was born in 941 as the fourth son of the King of Qin Han Kuangsi and Lady Xiao (蕭氏). However, his father died in southwest Nanjing after he went there to meet an envoy.

== Political career ==
=== Reign of Emperor Jingzong ===
Han Derang served as a military officer in 979 (10th year of the reign of Emperor Jingzong of Liao). He was gradually promoted. He stayed in Nanjing and became the most influential and powerful minister not long after his promotion.

In 979, the first year of Qianheng (乾亨), Han fought against the Northern Song dynasty's invasion at Youdu, Nanjing, and was awarded the Liaoxing Army (辽兴军) not long after his campaign against it. After this, he entered the North Court as the secret envoy from the South Court and become the most powerful person among the Han people. At this time, Han was already 38.

=== Reign of Emperor Shengzong ===
When Emperor Jingzong's oldest son, Yelü Longxu (耶律隆绪), ascended the throne as Emperor Shengzong in 982, Empress Xiao, Jingzong's widow, become his regent because Shengzong was only 11 years old. She ordered Han Derang to take charge of the imperial guards. In 985, Han became a politician and prime minister of Liao. Han took an important role in decision-making and in stabilizing the political situation in Shengzong's early years.

Han led his army to defeat Cao Bin (曹彬) and Mi Xin (米信)'s troops in their expedition to the Northern Song dynasty. Han became Duke of Chuguo (楚国公) and then King of Chu (楚王). He was later appointed as both Prime Minister of Northern Song (北府宰相) and the Secret Envoy of the Privy Council (兼领枢密使). He was Privy Councilor of Northern Song (兼北院枢密使) too. The emperor entrusted him and made him King of Qi (齐王).

After the alliance of Chanyuan, Han become Grand King of Jin (晋国王) and was given Liao's imperial name as Yelü Longyun (耶律隆运). However, in 1011, he followed Shengzong to Goryeo, where he died and was given the posthumous name of Wénzhōng (文忠). His temple was built in Qianling Mausoleum.

== Legacy ==
Han never married and was childless. Knowing this, Shengzong gave Han his brothers, Yelü Longyou's (耶律隆祐) two sons, Yelü Zongye (耶律宗業) and Yelü Zongfan (耶律宗范) as Han's heirs. However, neither of them had successors. Therefore, during Emperor Daozong's reign, they took the King of Wei Yelü Zongxi's (耶律宗熙) son as their heir.

== In popular culture ==
- Portrayed by Lee Jin-woo in the 2009 KBS2 TV series Empress Cheonchu
- Portrayed by Shawn Dou in the 2020 Chinese TV Series The Legend of Xiao Chuo.

== See also ==
- History of Liao (vol.82)
- Xiao Hunian
- Lady Xiao
- Xiao Siwen
- The Legend of Xiao Chuo
- Yelü Xiuge
- Yelü Xiezhen
