= Consort Xiao =

Consort Xiao may refer to:

- Empress Xiao (Sui dynasty) (566–648), wife of Emperor Yang of Sui
- Pure Consort Xiao (died 655), concubine of Emperor Gaozong of Tang
- Empress Zhenxian (died 847), concubine of Emperor Muzong of Tang
- Xiao Wen (died 936), wife of Emperor Taizong of Liao
- Empress Rouzhen (died 951), concubine of prince Yelü Bei
- Xiao Sagezhi (died 951), consort of Emperor Shizong of Liao
- Xiao sisters
  - Xiao Hunian (died 1007), wife of the prince Yelü Yansage
  - Princess Xiao (died after 981), wife of the prince Yelü Xiyin
  - Xiao Yanyan (953–1009), wife of Emperor Jingzong of Liao
- Xiao Noujin (980–1057), concubine of Emperor Shengzong of Liao
- Xiao Guanyin (1040–1075), wife of Emperor Daozong of Liao
- Xiao Tabuyan (died after 1150), Yelü Dashi's wife

== See also ==
- Yu Daolian (died 366), Jin dynasty empress, posthumously known as Empress Xiao
- Xiao Wenshou (343–423), mother of Liu Song's founding emperor Liu Yu
