= Yelü Lübugu =

Liao dynasty princess

Yelü Lübugu 耶律呂不古
- Princess of the Liao dynasty
- Born: Yelü Lübugu; Liao dynasty
- Died: Liao dynasty
- Husband: Xiao Siwen
- Issue: Xiao Hunian; Lady Xiao; Xiao Yanyan
Names
- Princess of the Yan State (燕國公主; given during the Baoning period); Grand Princess Supreme of the Yan State (燕國大長公主)
- House: Yelü
- Father: Emperor Taizong of Liao

Yelü Lübugu
- Simplified Chinese: 耶律呂不古
Transcriptions
Standard Mandarin
- Hanyu Pinyin: Yélǜ Lǚbùgǔ

Yelü Lübugu (Chinese: 耶律呂不古), noble title Princess of Yan State (燕國公主), was a princess of the Liao dynasty of China. She was the first daughter of Emperor Taizong and the wife of chancellor Xiao Siwen. She bore Xiao Siwen the three Xiao Sisters: Xiao Hunian, Lady Xiao and Xiao Yanyan. However, she died from her illness. Her youngest daughter Xiao Yanyan married Emperor Jingzong and in 969 and became empress consort. The Xiao family was the consort kin of the Liao dynasty, with all future empresses and imperial brides originating from this clan.

== Family ==
- Husband: Xiao Siwen
1. Daughter: Xiao Hunian (953 - 1009) (萧胡辇)
  1. Son In-law: Yelü Yansage (935 - 972) (耶律罨撒葛)
2. Daughter: Lady Xiao (萧氏)
  1. Son In-law: Yelü Xiyin (耶律喜隱)
3. Daughter: Xiao Yanyan (953 - 1009) (蕭燕燕) – also known as Xiao Chuo (蕭綽)
  1. Son In-law: Emperor Jingzong of Liao (1 September 948 - 13 October 982) (遼景宗) – had 4 sons and 3 daughters.
4. Adopted son: Xiao Jixian (萧继先) – Actually was Xiao Siwen's nephew.
