= Han Kuangsi =

Han Kuangsi 韓匡嗣
- Born: 918; Liao dynasty, Chinese
- Died: 983; Liao dynasty, Chinese
- Occupation: Minister of Liao
- Years active: ?–983
- Title: King Feng of Yan (封燕王); King of Qin (秦王)
- Spouse: Lady Xiao
- Children: 9 sons and 3 daughters
- Father: Han Zhigu (韩知古; Han Kuangsi was his third son)

Chinese name
- Traditional Chinese: 韓匡嗣
- Simplified Chinese: 韩匡嗣
Transcriptions
Standard Mandarin
- Hanyu Pinyin: Hán Kuāngsì

Korean name
- Hangul: 한광사
- Hanja: 韓匡嗣
- RR: Han Gwangsa
- MR: Han Kwangsa

Han Kuangsi (simplified Chinese: 韩匡嗣; traditional Chinese: 韓匡嗣; pinyin: Hán Kuāngsì; 918–983) was a physician and minister of the Liao dynasty. He wrote The Epitaph of Han Kuangsi (韩匡嗣墓志), which was discovered in the Bairin Left Banner in 1995.

Han Kuangsi served in Changle Palace (长乐宫). Empress Shulü Ping regarded him as her son. However he did not occupy a high position under Emperor Taizong and Emperor Muzong. Han later went to Emperor Taizu's memorial temple where he was examined and secured. Han also befriended Yelü Xian and later helped him to ascend to the throne as Emperor Jingzong. After this, Han was appointed as the Jiedu Envoy of the Shiping Army (始平军节度使). He also served him in Beijing and stayed in Nanjing as a Southwest secret envoy, also handling the Jinchang Army Jiedu Envoy (晋昌军节度使等). Because of this contribution, Han Kuangsi was honoured as King of Fengyan (封燕王) and later King of Qin (秦王).

In October, along with Yelü Xiuge and Yelü Sha, Han led 50,000 horses to attack Zhenzhou and Song dynasty's soldiers in Mancheng. However, Han made a wrong command and then his army was defeated; Yelü Xiuge also retreated from the enemy. Hearing this, the Emperor Jingzong ordered Han Jusi (韩巨嗣) to change him, and awarded Xiuge the title Great King of the Northern (为北院大王).

== Issues ==
- Wife: Lady Xiao (蕭氏), also known as Queen of Yan (燕王妃) and Queen of Qin (秦王妃) – Bore him 9 sons and 3 daughters, they were:
  - Han Deyuan (韩德源), 1st son – a Grand Commandant (太尉; Taiwei), he was the Shiping Army Jidu Envoy (始平军节度使).
  - Han Deqing (韩德庆), 2nd son – a Situ (司徒), he was a General Left Guard (左监门卫将军).
  - Han Dezhang (韩德彰), 3rd son – a Felt maker (毡毯使) and Zuosanqichang's attendant (左散骑常侍).
  - Han Derang (韩德让), 4th son – a Privy Envoy (枢密使), he was known for his succession on won in against the Northern Song dynasty's invasion in Youdu, Nanjing and defeated Cao Bin (曹彬) and Mi Xin (米信)'s troops in their expedition to Northern Song dynasty. Later, he was given Liao's imperial name as Yelü Longyun (耶律隆运) after the Chanyuan's alliance.
  - Han Deyong (韩德颙), 5th son – a Grand Commandant (太尉; Taiwei), he was a Right Shenwu General Shenwu (右神武大将军) and was named as Han Dening (韩德凝) in 1010? (28th year reign of Emperor Shengzong of Liao, Toghe era). His given name was Yelü Longyou (耶律隆祐) for whom this name was used for Liao's imperial families.
  - Han Dechong (韩德冲), 6th son – a Grand Commandant (太尉; Taiwei), he was an Envoy of the Imperial Household Ministry (户部使) and a Jiedu Envoy of the Weisheng Army (威胜军节度使).
  - Han Desheng (韩德晟), 7th son – No records about his life.
  - Han Dechang (韩德昌), 8th son – a Lulongjun Jiedu Envoy (卢龙军节度使).
  - Lady Han (韓氏), 1st daughter – Married Xiao Weiyin (蕭猥因) and become the parent of Xiao Pusage (蕭菩薩哥) who become the future wife and Empress Consort of Emperor Shengzong of Liao.
  - Lady Han (韓氏), 2nd daughter – Married Geng Shaoji (耿紹紀).
  - Lady Han (韓氏), 3rd daughter –Married Xiao Han (蕭罕).
  - Han Dewei (韩德威), 9th son – a Taishi (太师), he was a Southwest recruits envoy (西南面招讨使兼) and the Jiedushi Zhangwu Army (彰武军节度使).

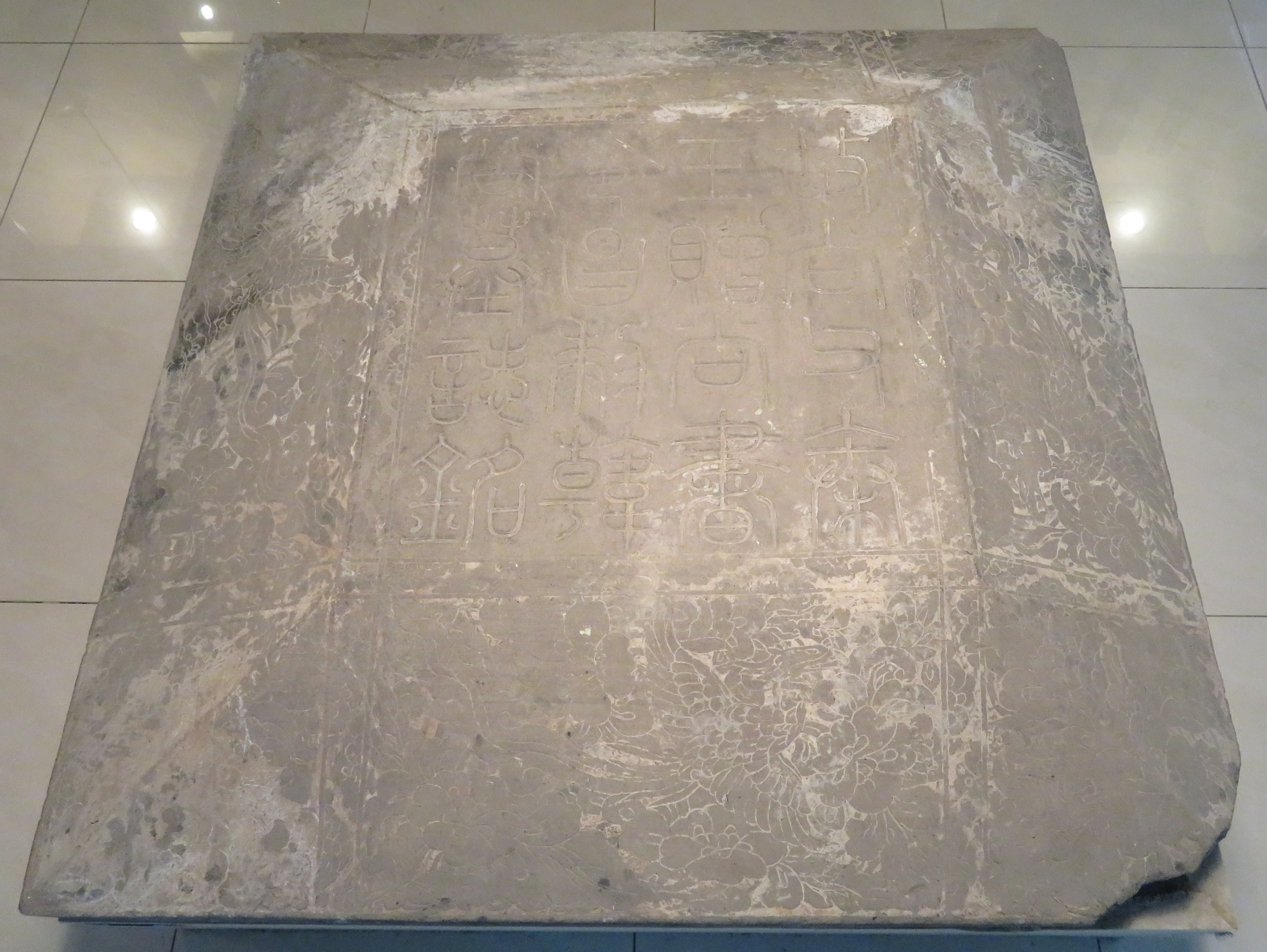
The Cover Epitaph of Han Kuangsi

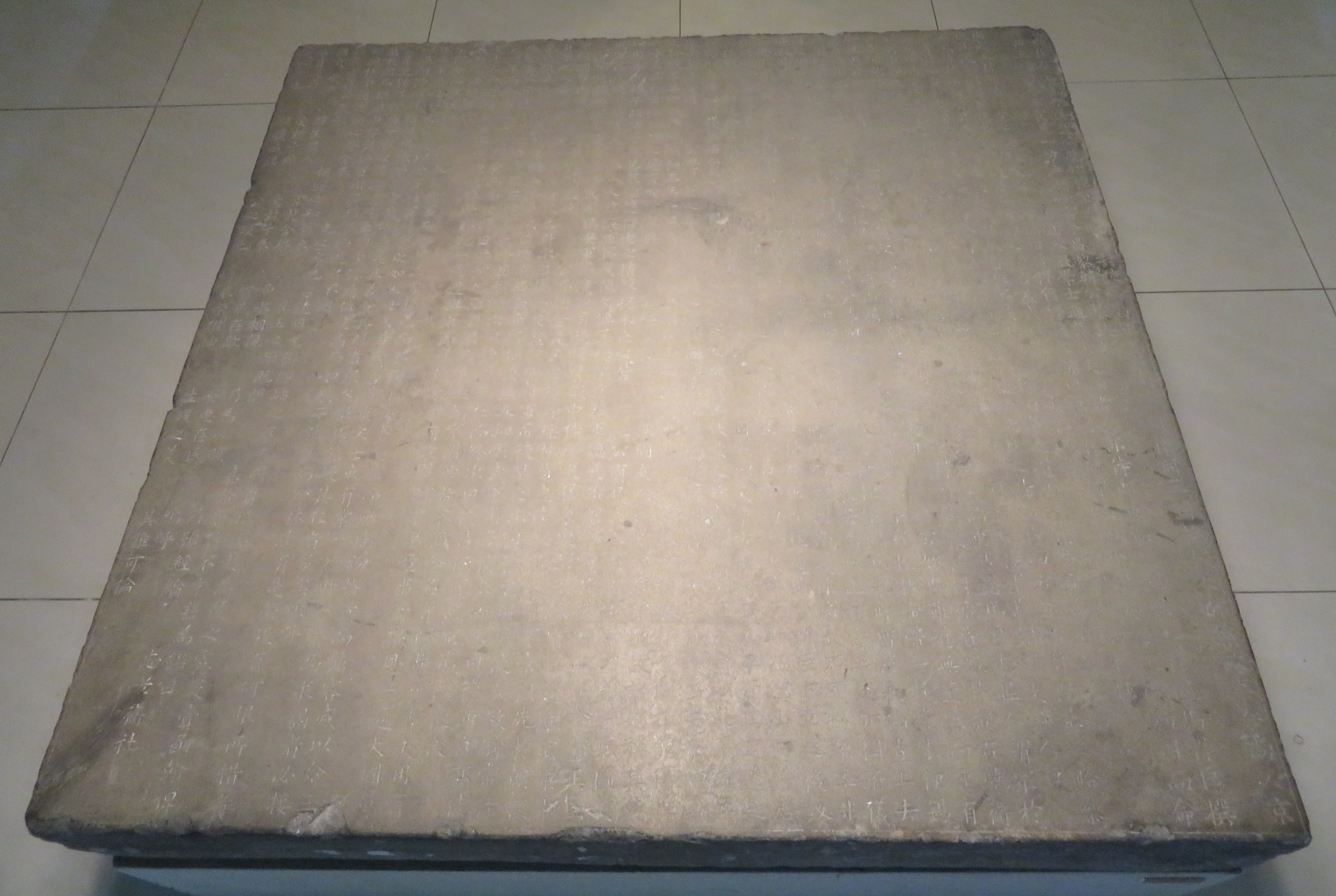
The Epitaph of Han Kuangsi

== Popular culture ==
- Portrayed by Jiang Kai in the 2020 Chinese TV Series The Legend of Xiao Chuo.
