= Tomb of Princess of Chen State =

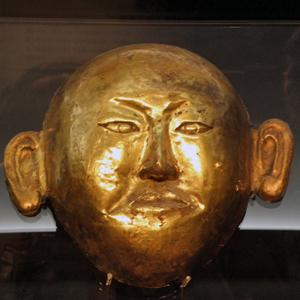
Princess of Chen's golden mask

The Tomb of Princess of Chen State is a tomb of the Liao dynasty (916–1125) at Qinglongshan Town, Naiman Banner, Tongliao, Inner Mongolia, China. Discovered by archaeologists in 1986, the tomb is notable for being completely intact and the number of grave goods it contained, including an epitaph bearing the name of Princess of Chen State (d. 1018), a granddaughter of Emperor Jingzong of Liao (948–982) through his son, Yelü Longqing. The Princess of Chen State died at the age of 18 and was entombed with her husband, Xiao Shaoju, who had also passed away a year earlier.

== Burial chamber ==
The princess and her husband's burial chamber is circular and 4.38 m in diameter. It has a vaulted ceiling a bit under 4 m in height. The antechamber and ceiling are painted with murals depicting the sun, moon, and stars as well as wooden architectural supports. While the tomb's architecture and murals were designed in accordance with imperial Liao and Chinese influences, the mural of the human procession specifically depicts Khitans in Khitan dress and hairstyles.

== Objects ==
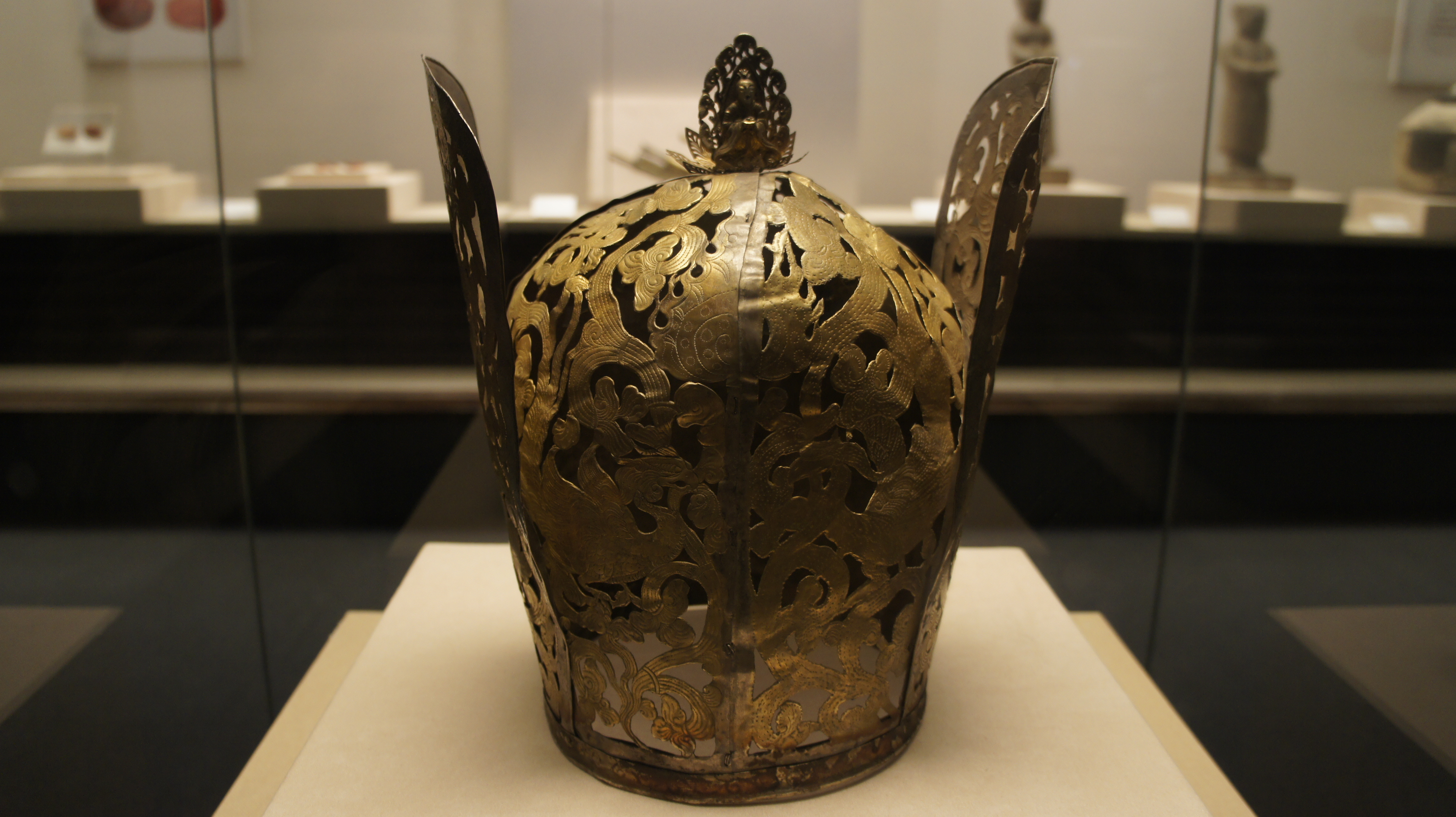
Princess of Chen's gilt silver crown

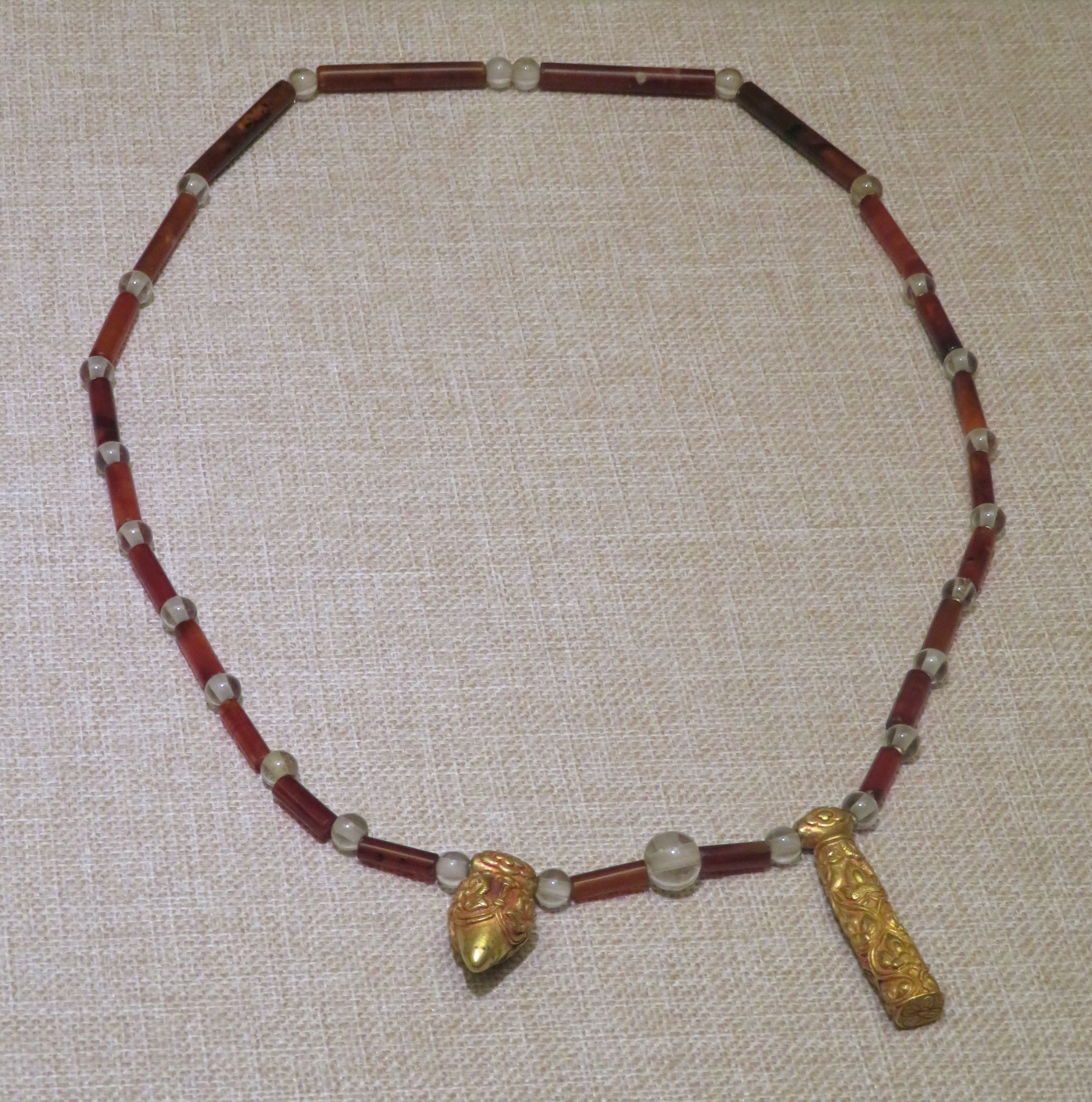
Amber and crystal necklace with Khitan heart and column amulets, Liao dynasty

The entombed princess was found with "a gold funerary mask, a silver mesh suit, jade ornaments, and precious glass, ceramic, and metal vessels", among other objects showing diverse origins and influences. Around her neck she wore two amber bead necklaces of different sizes, made using material from the Baltic Sea region, bearing the name of the Liao dynasty and bird, fish, and flower carvings - Chinese motifs symbolizing luck and wards against evil. The smaller necklace has two amulets in the shape of a heart and a long and narrow column. It is unknown what these symbols meant but they are specific to Khitan culture among their elites. The heart is placed on the deceased's right side and the narrow column on the left. Amber was prized in the Liao dynasty and thought to have magical properties.

Two gilded silver crowns were found. The one belonging to the princess features Taoist symbols including a miniature statuette of Yuanshi Tianzun (Primeval Lord of Heaven). In Taoism, Yuanshin Tianzun's presence signifies guiding the deceased to transcend life and death and to freedom from reincarnation, as well as an afterlife. The husband's crown also features similar Taoist symbols including a depiction of Xuanwu, a guardian deity of the north responsible for subduing demons and protecting living beings. Together, the two deities symbolize the completion of the cycle of life and death through the deceased's alignment with natural laws.

Both the princess and her husband were found on brick funerary beds originally decorated with silver. Their bodies were encased with metal netting. They both wore crowns and golden masks held together by silver wire connecting to the wire suit. On their feet they wore gold and silver boots. An assortment of objects were attached to metal waist belts.

Other items include a gilt silver makeup case with dragon-embossing, inside of which were smaller silver cases, some containing residues of makeup powder.
