= Yelü Lihu =

Crown Prince of the Liao dynasty (911–960)

Crown Prince of the Liao dynasty
- Reign: 930–947
- Born: 911
- Died: 960 (aged 48–49)
- Spouse: Empress Hejing (和敬皇后)
- Issue: Yelü Xiyin, Prince of Song; Yelü Wan, Prince of Wei
Posthumous name
- Emperor Qinshun (欽順皇帝); Emperor Zhangsu (章肅皇帝)
- Father: Emperor Taizu of Liao
- Mother: Shulü Ping

Chinese name
- Chinese: 耶律李胡
Transcriptions
Standard Mandarin
- Hanyu Pinyin: Yélǜ Lǐhú
- Wade–Giles: Yeh-lü Li-hu

Courtesy name Yelü Xiyin
- Traditional Chinese: 耶律奚隱
- Simplified Chinese: 耶律奚隐
Transcriptions
Standard Mandarin
- Hanyu Pinyin: Yélǜ Xīyǐn
- Wade–Giles: Yeh-lü Hsi-yin

Honggu
- Chinese: 洪古
Transcriptions
Standard Mandarin
- Hanyu Pinyin: Hónggǔ
- Wade–Giles: Hung-ku

Emperor Zhangsu
- Traditional Chinese: 章肅皇帝
- Simplified Chinese: 章肃皇帝
Transcriptions
Standard Mandarin
- Hanyu Pinyin: Zhāngsù Huángdì
- Wade–Giles: Chang-su Huang-ti

Yelü Lihu (911–960), Sinicized name Yelü Honggu, courtesy name Xiyin, was an imperial prince of the Liao dynasty of China. As the third son of the Liao's founding emperor Emperor Taizu (Yelü Abaoji) and his wife Shulü Ping, Yelü Lihu served as crown prince during the reign of his older brother Emperor Taizong (Yelü Deguang). While Empress Shulü wanted Yelü Lihu to succeed Emperor Taizong after the latter's death, their older brother Yelü Bei's son Yelü Ruan was able to defeat Yelü Lihu in battle and take the throne. Yelü Lihu was placed under house arrest and then imprisoned, dying in captivity. He was posthumously honored as an emperor by Emperor Shengzong.

== Life ==
=== Early years ===
Yelü Lihu was born in 911, as the third son of the first Liao emperor Yelü Abaoji and his wife Shulü Ping. His older brothers were Yelü Bei and Yelü Deguang. Yelü Lihu was Lady Shulü's youngest son, although Yelü Abaoji would later have a younger son, Yelü Yaliguo (耶律牙里果), by a Lady Xiao. In 916, Yelü Abaoji claimed the title of emperor, establishing the Liao dynasty.

In Yelü Lihu's youth, he was said to be brave, strong, and ferocious but also cruel. Even on minor things where people would anger him, he would punish those people by tattooing their faces or by throwing them into fire or water. There was a time when Emperor Taizu observed his sons sleeping, with Yelü Lihu curled up and sleeping toward the inside. He commented, "This must be a sign that he is lesser to the others." There was also a time when it was extremely cold, when he told his sons to go out to fetch firewood. Yelü Deguang, without being choosy about the kind of wood, grabbed the wood and returned quickly. Yelü Bei selected the dry wood, bundled it up carefully, and then returned with the wood. Yelü Lihu did not gather much wood and lost much on the way, and when he returned, he simply left the wood there and stood by. Emperor Taizu commented, "The oldest is skillful, but the second is more capable. The youngest is lesser than the others." However, Empress Shulü favored Yelü Lihu.

=== During Emperor Taizong's reign ===
Emperor Taizu died in 926. After his death, Empress Shulü diverted the succession away from Yelü Bei, to Yelü Deguang, who took the throne as Emperor Taizong. In 930, Emperor Taizong sent Yelü Lihu on an incursion into the territory of Khitan's southern neighbor Later Tang. Yelü Lihu attacked Later Tang's Huan Prefecture (寰州) in modern Shuozhou, Shanxi, and returned with many captives. Emperor Taizong thereafter created him crown prince and gave him the title of general of all armies. This designation of Yelü Lihu as crown prince apparently aggravated Yelü Bei further, as it was later that year that Yelü Bei fled to Later Tang. During Emperor Taizong's subsequent campaigns, Yelü Lihu was often put in charge of defending the capital Linhuang (臨潢), in modern Chifeng, Inner Mongolia.

In 936, Emperor Taizong launched a campaign to aid the Later Tang general Shi Jingtang, the brother-in-law of the Later Tang emperor Li Congke, to overthrow the Later Tang. The campaign was successful, and Shi's new Later Jin replaced Later Tang as the ruling regime in central and northern China. Shi remained submissive toward the Khitans—whose state was then renamed Liao—and in 938 had his chancellors Feng Dao and Liu Xu visit Liao on a diplomatic mission, offering honorable titles to Emperor Taizong and Empress Dowager Shulü, including honoring Emperor Taizong as "father emperor" while Shi referred to himself as "son emperor." Shi also often offered gifts to many key Liao generals and nobles, and Yelü Lihu, as crown prince, was the recipient of many of these gifts as well. However, after Shi's death, his nephew and successor Shi Chonggui took a confrontational stance against Liao, causing Emperor Taizong to launch a major campaign against Later Jin in 946, destroying it. During the campaign, Yelü Lihu presumably remained at Linhuang to defend it.

=== After Emperor Taizong's reign ===
Emperor Taizong claimed imperial authority over China as well, but soon tired of the many rebellions rising up against him throughout the former Later Jin realm. He began a withdrawal back to Liao proper but died on the way near Hengzhou (now Zhengding in Shijiazhuang Prefecture, Hebei). As Empress Dowager Shulü had, when Emperor Taizu died, killed many chieftains so that she could bury them with Emperor Taizu, many of the Khitan generals feared that she would do the same thing again. They therefore resolved to support Yelü Bei's son Yelü Ruan, Prince of Yongkang, as emperor. Yelü Ruan was subsequently able to overpower the ethnically Han Chinese general Zhao Yanshou, who had designs on claiming the imperial title himself, and to take over Heng Prefecture, declaring himself emperor (posthumously remembered as Emperor Shizong of the Liao).

However, knowing that Empress Dowager Shulü had intended for Yelü Lihu to succeed, Emperor Shizong decided to head back north to Liao proper in order to face off against his grandmother. She sent Yelü Lihu with her army to face Emperor Shizong, but Yelü Lihu was defeated by Emperor Shizong's forward commanders Yelü Anduan (耶律安端), a younger brother of Emperor Taizu, and Yelü Liuge (耶律留哥). Knowing that her cause was lost, Empress Dowager Shulü accepted the suggestion of the official Yelü Wuzhi (耶律屋質) and negotiated a peace agreement whereby she accepted Emperor Shizong as emperor. Emperor Shizong subsequently had her placed under house arrest at Emperor Taizu's tomb, while Yelü Lihu was placed under house arrest at Zuzhou (祖州) in modern Chifeng.

In 960, Yelü Lihu's son Yelü Xiyin (耶律喜隱) plotted a rebellion against the reigning emperor Muzong, Emperor Taizong's son Yelü Jing. As a result, both he and Yelü Lihu were imprisoned. Yelü Lihu died in custody soon thereafter, although Yelü Xiyin did not and was subsequently released. Yelü Xiyin was then killed in another rebellion, along with as his son by Lady Xiao.

== Family ==
- Empress Hejing, of the Xiao clan (和敬皇后蕭氏)
  - Yelü Xiyin, Prince of Song (宋王 耶律喜隱, d. 982), 1st son
  - Yelü Wan, Prince of Wei (衛王 耶律宛), 2nd son

== In popular culture ==
- Portrayed by Wang Huichun in the 2020 Chinese TV series The Legend of Xiao Chuo.
