= Chanyuan Treaty =

1005 Song–Liao treaty

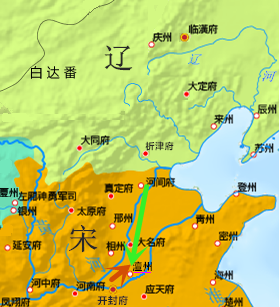
The border between the two dynasties

The Chanyuan Treaty (Chinese: 澶渊之盟; pinyin: Chányuān Zhī Méng) was signed between the Han-led Northern Song dynasty and the Khitan-led Liao dynasty in 1005, marking a pivotal point in Chinese history and in the relations between the two empires. The treaty laid the foundation for approximately a century of relative peace between the two major powers, which lasted until the Alliance Conducted at Sea was formed between the Song dynasty and the Jurchen-led Jin dynasty in the early 12th century. The diplomatic framework itself would continue to be emulated throughout East Asia until the establishment of the Mongol Empire in the 13th century.

== Liao–Song relations ==
After the Song dynasty was founded in 960, succeeding the turbulent Five Dynasties and Ten Kingdoms period, relations between Song and Liao were initially cordial. Song had more important matters on their hands, namely conquering the remaining southern states. After unifying the south in 979, Song turned their eyes north. That year, they destroyed Northern Han, a Shatuo Turk state that considered itself the legitimate successor of the Later Han dynasty that had fallen in 950. As it was under the protection of Liao, it engendered some friction between the two empires. However, what concerned Song even more was Liao's continued possession of the strategic Sixteen Prefectures, which included modern-day Beijing.

After Northern Han was destroyed by Song, Emperor Taizong decided to march on Liao holdings in the Sixteen Prefectures, but the Song forces were routed at the Battle of Gaoliang River and the emperor had to retreat in ignominy.

Song tried once again in 986, this time attepting to take advantage of the fact that a young emperor occupied the Liao throne. They advanced on the Sixteen Prefectures in three columns. However, Liao won decisive victories on all three fronts.

Emperor Zhenzong succeeded to the Song throne in 997. Relations between Song and Liao worsened throughout the decade. In 999, Emperor Shengzong of Liao commenced annual attacks against Song. Nevertheless, no significant change occurred until 1004.

== Liao invasion of 1004 ==
Emperor Shengzong decided to personally launch a campaign against Song in the summer of 1004. He took cavalry and encamped about one hundred miles (160 kilometers) north of the Song capital of Bianjing (present-day Kaifeng, Henan). Reluctantly, Emperor Zhenzong marched northward to engage the Liao troops at Chan Prefecture (formerly known as Chanyuan Commandery; present-day Puyang, Henan). He decided upon this location because it was the first large settlement across from the Yellow River. The emperor believed that crossing the Yellow River would have great symbolic and psychological value. To protect Chan Prefecture, Kou Zhun, the lead planner of the Song expedition, had implemented defensive measures such as trenches, but these defenses were already weakened after heavy fighting, resulting in many thousands of casualties, including a large number of generals. The Song court began to worry that the undertaking was not safe for the emperor because the Liao forces were making serious advances in the Hebei Circuit. However, the arrival of the emperor raised the Song troops' morale while ensuring that the subsequent battle would be everlastingly famous.

A Song crossbow killed the Liao main general Xiao Talin in late 1004. This led to despair among the Khitans and crippled their offensive.

== Peace negotiations ==
The two sides reached a ceasefire in January 1005. The Song court, represented by Cao Liyong, negotiated with Empress Dowager Xiao and finalized an agreement. The terms of the treaty included:

1. Song would give Liao an annual tribute of 200,000 bolts of raw silk and 100,000 taels of silver.
2. All moats and city walls already in existence could be repaired, but no new ones could be constructed.
3. Song and Liao agreed to be sibling nations. Emperor Shengzong addressed Emperor Zhenzong as his elder brother, while Emperor Zhenzong addressed Emperor Shengzong as his younger brother and Empress Dowager Xiao as his aunt (叔母; ''wife of father's younger brother'').

Despite Song getting an arguably more prestigious position out of the treaty, there was opposition among the Song elite. Nevertheless, this treaty avoided any further major wars.

== Wang Jizhong ==
Wang Jizhong, a native of Bianjing, was captured by Liao in 1003 at a battle near Wangdu. The Liao emperor awarded Wang with official rank, while Wang made the best of his circumstances and spoke of the advantages of resolving the conflict with Song peacefully. Empress Dowager Xiao, who was in actual control of the Liao court at the time, had grown tired of war and listened to Wang's proposals. With the Empress Dowager's approval, Wang submitted a memorial to the Song emperor through the Song prefect of Mochou, stating that Liao wished to restore friendly relations. So, Wang facilitated the first peace talks between the two empires. He had inside information from both sides and knew exactly what each of them wanted in return for peace. In the end it was Wang who persuaded the Empress Dowager to give up territorial claims, which ultimately led to the Chanyuan Treaty.

== Significance of the treaty ==
Through the signing of the Chanyuan Treaty, Liao forced Song, who considered themselves the natural heirs to the central plains, to recognize them as peers.

This treaty immediately reduced the strain on Liao finances. Those annual tribute payments were used to facilitate the construction of Liao's central capital, Zhongjing (中京) (present-day Ningcheng County, Inner Mongolia). Peace with Song allowed Liao to focus more on their internal affairs and its relations with other peoples, and this new capital ultimately aided Liao in establishing an international trade network. Without the annual tribute from Song, it's highly unlikely that Liao would have been able to create such an expansive and sophisticated trade network.

This treaty also allowed Song to secure disputed territory in exchange for a minimal annual tribute. In addition, with the war over, the Song court was able to focus on other matters as well. For one, they could advance their foreign diplomacy. On a different note, they had the ability to curb military spending, which was putting serious strain on their economy. In the grand scheme of things, the annual tribute payments were a far smaller burden than Song's military spending concerning Liao.

On the other hand, the treaty was Song's official admission of their loss of the Sixteen Prefectures.

The treaty is generally viewed positively for ending large-scale military conflict between the two empires and facilitating peaceful relations for decades afterwards. This peace lasted until the Alliance Conducted at Sea, through which the Song dynasty and the Jurchen-led Jin dynasty agreed to jointly invade Liao.

== After the treaty ==
This treaty became the basis for relations between Song and other Chinese states including the Western Xia dynasty and the Jin dynasty.

Along the way, there were incidents that jeopardized the peace between Liao and Song. In 1042, Liao threatened to invade the Hedong Circuit in order to get Song to increase their annual tribute. Incursions by Western Xia in the northwest (at the urging of Liao) finally forced Song to raise their annual tribute to 300,000 bolts of silk and 200,000 taels of silver. Then in 1076, Song ceded a few parcels of land along the Hedong border to Liao. This inevitably created a predicament because the original guidelines of the treaty made sure that Song would not cede any territory to Liao.

The accounts of the treaty in the historical records of each dynasty are inconsistent. The altering of some details shows a great deal of political boundary maintenance and an attempt at retaining dignity, which is prevalent in the Song records. After the treaty was signed, the nature of the relationship between these two empires changed from one of pure rivalry to a supposed fraternal relationship. For the first time in Chinese history there were two Sons of Heaven, recognized as such by each side.

== See also ==
- List of treaties
