= Yelü Xiyin =

- Prince of Song
- Born: ?
- Died: 982
- Spouse: Lady Xiao
- Father: Yelü Lihu
- Mother: Empress Hejing

Yelü Xiyin (Chinese: 耶律喜隱; ? – 982), courtesy name Yuande (元德), noble title Prince of Song (宋王), was an imperial prince of China's Liao dynasty. He was the eldest son of former Crown Prince Yelü Lihu by Empress Hejing. Xiyin married Lady Xiao, the second daughter of Prime minister Xiao Siwen.

== Rebellions ==
In 960, Yelü Xiyin plotted a rebellion against then-reigning Emperor Muzong (Emperor Taizong's son Yelü Jing). As a result, both he and his father Yelü Lihu were arrested and placed in jail. Yelü Lihu died in jail, but he was subsequently released after Lady Xiao's brother-in-law Yelü Xian ascended to the throne as Emperor Jingzong.

However, Yelü Xiyin later planned another rebellion against Emperor Jingzong. He was captured, and his son with Lady Xiao was murdered by Liao troops in 982. Seeking revenge for her husband and son, Lady Xiao attempted to poison the then Empress Dowager Xiao Yanyan. She failed, and was forced to commit suicide.

== In popular culture ==
- Portrayed by Ji Chen in the 2020 Chinese TV series The Legend of Xiao Chuo.
