= Qianheng =

Qianheng (乾亨) was a Chinese era name used by several emperors of China. It may refer to:

- The word "Qiánghéng" means "tyrannical in Chinese.
- Qianheng (917–925), era name used by Liu Yan (emperor), emperor of Southern Han
- Qianheng (979–983), era name used by Emperor Jingzong of Liao
