= Xiao Siwen =

Chinese politician

- Traditional Chinese: 蕭思溫
- Simplified Chinese: 萧思温
Transcriptions
Standard Mandarin
- Hanyu Pinyin: Xiāo Sīwēn

Xiao Siwen (d. 970), childhood nickname Yingu (寅古), noble title Prince of Wei (魏王), was a Chinese politician who served as the chancellor and northern commissioner for military affairs of the Liao dynasty. He was the father of the Xiao sisters (Xiao Hunian, Lady Xiao and Xiao Yanyan). However, for the sake of family glory, he agreed to marry his youngest daughter Xiao Yanyan to the Emperor Jingzong and in 969. After Xiao Yanyan became empress consort, Xiao Siwen was made the Prince of Wei. He was assassinated while accompanying Emperor Jingzong on a hunt in 970.

== Family ==
- Wife: Yelü Lübugu, Princess of Yan (耶律呂不古 燕國公主)
1. Daughter: Xiao Hunian (953 - 1009) (蕭胡輦)
  1. Son In-law: Yelü Yansage (935 - 972) (耶律罨撒葛)
2. Daughter: Lady Xiao (蕭氏)
  1. Son In-law: Yelü Xiyin (耶律喜隱)
3. Daughter: Xiao Yanyan (953 - 1009) (蕭燕燕) – also known as Xiao Chuo (蕭綽)
  1. Son In-law: Emperor Jingzong of Liao (1 September 948 - 13 October 982) (遼景宗) – had 4 sons and 3 daughters.
4. Adopted son: Xiao Jixian (蕭繼先) – Actually was Xiao Siwen's nephew.

== In popular culture ==
- Portrayed by Liu Yijun in the 2020 Chinese TV series The Legend of Xiao Chuo.
