= Yelü Shuge =

Chinese princess

Yelü Shuge 耶律淑哥

Princess of Liao dynasty
- Born: Yelü Shuge; Liao dynasty
- Died: Liao dynasty
- Husband: m. Lu Jun (980–983) m. Xiao Shennu (m. 983 AD)
- Father: Emperor Jingzong of Liao
- Mother: Consort of Bohai

Yelü Shuge
- Simplified Chinese: 耶律淑哥
Transcriptions
Standard Mandarin
- Hanyu Pinyin: Yélǜ Shūgē

Yelü Shuge (Chinese: 耶律淑哥) was a Liao dynasty imperial princess. She was the fourth daughter of Emperor Jingzong of Liao and Consort of Bohai. She firstly married Lu Jun (卢俊) in 980 (2nd year of the Qianheng era) from the Northern Han dynasty. However, in 983 (1st year of the Tonghe era), their odds were against each other and wanted to divorce. Then in October of the same year, she remarried again with Xiao Shennu (萧神奴).
