= The Legend of Xiao Chuo =

- Promotional poster
- Genre: Historical fiction Romance; Political
- Based on: Yan Yun Tai by Jiang Shengnan
- Written by: Jiang Shengnan
- Directed by: Jeffrey Jiang Chiang; Peng Xuejun
- Starring: Tiffany Tang; Shawn Dou; Charmaine Sheh; Jing Chao
- Country of origin: China
- Original language: Mandarin
- No. of seasons: 1
- No. of episodes: 48

Production
- Executive producer: Han Zhijie
- Producers: Qi Shuai; Wang Juan; Sun Zhonghuai
- Running time: 45 min
- Production company: Tencent Penguin Pictures

Original release
- Network: Tencent Video; Beijing Television

The Legend of Xiao Chuo (Chinese: 燕云台; pinyin: Yan Yun Tai) is a 2020 Chinese television series based on the novel Yan Yun Tai by Jiang Shengnan. It stars Tiffany Tang in the title role, along with Shawn Dou, Charmaine Sheh and Jing Chao. The series chronicles the life of legendary Empress Xiao Yanyan.

== Plot ==
This is the story of Empress Xiao Yanyan, also known as Xiao Chuo from the Liao dynasty.

Xiao Yanyan is the third daughter of prime minister Xiao Siwen and Princess Yan. She falls in love with the young lieutenant Han Derang and the couple eventually decide to marry each other. However, their promise of love is severed when Xiao Siwen, Yanyan's father agrees to let Yelü Xian take Yanyan as his empress after ascended the throne. Yanyan's relationship with sisters Xiao Hunian and Wuguli also deteriorate due to the power struggle between their husbands, who each believe they have a legitimate claim to the throne.

Suddenly, Yelu Xian was critically ill that he entrusted the government to Yanyan and she became the most important woman in Liao history. She broke political boundaries, completed the process of Liao's sinicization from original tribe to a feudal dynasty, promoted the integration of Khitans and Hans, also bring prosperous and continuous towards the dynasty. On emotional side, she bravely pursued disregarding the widow's voice and the world's material opinions about women.

== Cast ==
=== Main ===
Actors	Characters	Character's description	Titles and ranks
Tiffany Tang	Xiao Yanyan	The legendary Empress Regent Xiao Chuo and the youngest Xiao sister. A smart and competitive person, as a young girl, she has always been loved by her parents. She is an extremely passionate person with lots of interests and is also very devoted. Although she's always been in love with Han Derang, fate and conditions force her to break with him and enter the Palace as Yelü Xian's concubine, subsequently becoming his Empress. She has 3 children with Yelü Xian and after his death, their oldest son, Yelü Longxu, ascended the throne and she became the Empress Dowager. She later remarried Han Derang.	Xiao Yanyan the 3rd Young Miss of Xiao Mansion (蕭燕燕 宰相府三小姐), Noble Consort Xiao (蕭貴妃), Empress Xiao (蕭皇后), Empress Regent Xiao (蕭攝政皇后), Empress Dowager Xiao (蕭皇太后).
Shawn Dou	Han Derang, King of Jin	A Liao general who is Xiao Yanyan's lover and ex-fiancé. A brave and smart young man. He is forced to break up with Yanyan in spite of their love and engagement. He was one of Yelü Xian's trusted people in the Palace but felt betrayed and disappointed after he forced Yanyan to be his concubine. Later, he was reluctantly ordered to marry Li Si by his mother. He always accompanied Yanyan and assisted her in state affairs. In the end, he remarried Xiao Yanyan.	Han Derang the 4th Young Master of Han Mansion (韓德讓), Military Commander (郎君軍右統領), Privy Council General (樞密院通事), South Chancellor (南院樞密史), Prime Minister (大丞相), King of Jin (晉王).
Lu Zhanxiang (young)	Han Derang, King of Jin	A Liao general who is Xiao Yanyan's lover and ex-fiancé. A brave and smart young man. He is forced to break up with Yanyan in spite of their love and engagement. He was one of Yelü Xian's trusted people in the Palace but felt betrayed and disappointed after he forced Yanyan to be his concubine. Later, he was reluctantly ordered to marry Li Si by his mother. He always accompanied Yanyan and assisted her in state affairs. In the end, he remarried Xiao Yanyan.	Han Derang the 4th Young Master of Han Mansion (韓德讓), Military Commander (郎君軍右統領), Privy Council General (樞密院通事), South Chancellor (南院樞密史), Prime Minister (大丞相), King of Jin (晉王).
Charmaine Sheh	Xiao Hunian, Queen Taiping	The eldest of the Xiao sisters. A strong Liao female soldier who is good at inspecting the military, opening up territories and commanding the three armies to fight together. Initially, she has unrequited feelings for Han Derang but later sacrifices herself for the sake of Xiao family and marries Yelü Yansage. Although her marriage with Yansage was just a loveless political marriage at the start, she becomes moved by Yansage's affection and consequently fell in love with him. After his death, she meets with Talan A'bo who rescues her when she had a riding accident outdoors and later develops a mutual romantic affection. However, after learning the truth about Yansage's death, she began to resent Yanyan and then left Beijing. Her love story ends in tragedy with A'bo as well.	Xiao Hunian the 1st Young Miss of Xiao Mansion (萧胡辇 宰相府一小姐), Queen Taiping (太平王妃), Dowager Imperial Consort (皇太妃).
Jing Chao	Yelü Xian, King Mingyi	The fifth ruler of Liao and Xiao Yanyan's husband who is deeply in love with her. Despite the evident relationship between Xiao Yanyan and Han Derang, he still ordered her to enter the Palace as his concubine not long after his ascension to the throne. Before his death, the Liao Kingdom is handed over to Xiao Yanyan and making her the Empress Regent.	Yelü Xian (耶律贤), King Mingyi (明扆), Emperor Jingzong of Liao (遼景宗).
Lu Shan	Xiao Wuguili, Queen of Zhao	An innocent and naive but willful girl.The second of the Xiao sisters, married to Yelü Xiying and mother of Liulishou. Trying to avenge her husband's death, she conspires with the Queen of Ji to poison Yanyan, but later commits suicide after learning that the attempt was unsuccessful.	Xiao Wuguli the 2nd Young Miss of Xiao Mansion (萧乌骨里，相府二小姐), Queen of Zhao(赵王妃).

=== Supporting ===
==== People around Xiao sisters ====
- Liu Yijun as Xiao Siwen, King of Wei
  - Prime Minister of the Liao Dynasty and a father of the Xiao sisters. For the sake of the country, he agrees to marry his youngest daughter to Yelü Xian. He is later assassinated while accompanying Xian on a hunt.
- Wang Ziquan as Xiao Dalin, King of Lanling County
  - Xiao Siwen's nephew and Xiao sisters' first cousin. He dies getting shot by the Southern Armies.
- Sheng Yilun as Talan A'bo
  - A slave Xiao Hunian falls in love with since he is rescued by her while in danger. He later dies after trying to protect her.
- Gong Wanyi as Xiao Hailan
  - Xiao Taogu's daughter and Xiao sisters' niece.
- Feng Qilong as Xiao Haizhi
  - Xiao Siwen's nephew who turns against him. He is later executed by Xiao Yanyan.
- Gu Caobin as Xiao Haili
  - Xiao Siwen's other nephew who also turns against him alongside Xiao Haizi. He is also executed by Xiao Yanyan.
- Ren Xihong as Xiao Taogu
  - Xiao Hailan's father.
- Li Junwei as Xiao Weiyin
  - Xiao Pusage's father.

==== People around Han Derang ====
- Meng Ziyi as Li Si, Mrs. Han
  - A noble lady who is in love with Han Derang. She later becomes his wife but dies accidentally consuming poisoned alcohol.
- Jiang Kai as Han Kuangsi, King of Yan
  - Han Derang's father and Xiao Siwen's confidant. He is an Imperial physician.
- Juan Zi as Madame Han, Queen of Yan
  - Han Derang's mother and biggest supporter.
- Deng Ying as Madame Li
  - Li Si's mother.
- Zhuyuan as Madame Xiao Han
  - Han Derang's sister and Xiao Pusage's mother by marriage to Xiao Weiyin.

==== Imperial Household ====
- Tan Kai as Yelü Yansage, King Taiping, then King of Qi (Imperial Uncle)
  - Xiao Hunian's husband and Yelü Jing's younger brother and one of the main antagonist. An ambitious man who likes power and after his nephew, Yelü Xian ascended the throne, he became the Imperial Uncle. Despite his ambition, he truly loves Hunian and always take care of her in every possible way. However, when he tries to conspire, he got hit by an arrow from Xiao Yanyan and finally died in Hunian's arms.
- Ji Chen as Yelü Xiyin, King of Zhao
  - Xiao Wuguili's husband and one of the main antagonist, also the cousin of Yelü Xian. He was spared by emperor Yelü for the plot to take over the throne with his father but his father was made to die. Later his love and marriage with Wuguili was not sincere at first, and just using her, for her families power. However, after being together for a long time, he then sincerely loved her and had a son named Liulishou. Later, he got exiled to Zuzhou after he tried to rebel for the Emperor's throne. Not long after that, he then died along with his son.
- Shao Bing as Great King Wuzhi, the oldest member in the Liao Imperial Family.
- Li Ning as Yelü Jing, the Emperor
  - One of the main antagonist, Yelü Yansage's older brother and Yelü Xian's uncle. He also responsible for Xian's father's death. He wasn't intimate with any women, due to his fickle feelings and tempestuous, which made him also suffer from severe paranoia and delusions of people wanting to kill him for his throne, which resulted in him killing many guards, eunuchs, court maids and others around him. Due to this, he is eventually killed by his own guards.
- Wang Yuanke as Empress Zhen
  - The former Empress of Liao and Yelü Zhimo's birth mother. She is the only Han Empress Consort in Liao's history.
- Simon Lian as Yelü Zhimo, King of Ning
  - Yelü Xian's half little brother and Empress Zhen's son. However, he has an affair with one of Yelü Jing's maid, An Zhi and after it was discovered by emperor Jing, he lost one of his eye to protect An Zhi and then become half blind, plus was castrated for sleeping with the emperors maid. After An Zhi's death, he started to live alone in his Mansion and became a Buddhist monk.
- Zhao Yuanyuan as An Zhi, Queen of Ning
  - One of emperor Yelü's personal palace maids that's in love with Yelü Zhimo. However, She is killed by Zhimo's own hands after the emperor Yelü found out about their affair.
- Monica Mok as Yileilan, Queen of Ji
  - Yelü Dilie's wife. Later, she blamed Han Derang for her husband's death in the battlefield. Then, Xiao Yanyan gave her a poisoned wine to kill herself.
- Wang Junpeng as Yelü Dilie, King of Ji
  - Yelü Jing and Yelü Yansage's half little brother. He often look down on himself because of his biological mother's status just a maidservant. He has ambitions of ascending the throne and become the Emperor of Liao. Because of his greed, he got ambushed and killed by Song army along with his son.
- Wang Huichun as Yelü Lihu
  - Yelü Xiyin's father and Xiao Wuguili's father in-law. He was later made to drink poisoned wine under orders from the emperor Yelü, when his plot to take over the throne was discovered.
- Zhou Siyu as Yelü Liulishou
  - Xiao Wuguili and Yelü Xiyin's son. He later died along with his father when try to make a rebellion in Shangjing.
- Rong Zixi as Consort Xige
  - An arrogant and proud young lady who selected as Yelü Xian's concubine because she is Master Nüli's niece. She always jealous when sees or hears if Xiao Yanyan and Yelü Xian are together. She urged the two Dowager Consorts and forced them to tell that Xiao Siwen was dead to Xiao Yanyan. Later, Xian ordered her to be sent to the cold palace after it was discovered that she participated in Yelü Yansage's rebellion. She eventually died in the cold palace.
- Ren Hongmo as Yelü Daoyin, King of Shu
  - Xiao Wuguili and Queen of Ji's hand, he wanted to conspire and inspire a rebellion to fulfill his own wish. He was later made to drink poison under the orders from Empress Dowager Xiao Yanyan, after Xiao Wuguili's death.
- Sun Yali as Yelü Hugudian, Princess of Qin
  - Yelü Xian's younger sister and Xiao Chuoli's wife.
- Wang Churan as Yu Xiao, Consort of Bohai
  - Yelü Xian's later concubine, an expert in Medicine. After becoming his concubine, they had a son. She later killed herself after realizing she could not cure her husband's illness.
- Crystal Zhang as Consort Puge, Yelü Ruan's widow concubine.
- Huang Xiaoge as Consort Chuoli, Yelü Ruan's widow concubine.
- Yang Anqi as Yelü Ting, Princess Yicheng
  - Yelü Xiang's daughter and later married with Li Jiqian.
- Wang Yang Mei Zi as Queen of Shu
- Chen Hao as Wenshunu, Yelü Longxu, King of Liang, Xiao Yanyan and Yelü Xian's son.
  - Cary Ye as teenage Wenshunu
    - Leo Pei as child Wenshunu
- Yang Yutong as Xiao Pusage, Yelü Longxu's wife. She is Han Derang's niece.
  - Tao Yixi as young Xiao Pusage
- Hang Chengyu as Yelü Wage, Yelü Dilie's son.

==== Prime ministers and other Yelü peoples ====
- Ruan Shengwen as Yelü Xiuge
  - One of Yelü Xian's trusted persons in the court and Yelü Xiezhen's uncle. He later died due to his illness near the end of the episodes.
- Tim Yu as Yelü Xiezhen, Great King Nanyuan
  - A bright young man who is in love with Xiao Hailan, Xiao Yanyan's niece.
- Guan Yajun as Gao Xun
  - A power-hungry and manipulative man who is jealous of Xiao Siwen's power. To defeat him, he provokes Xiao Haili and Xiao Haizi to assassinate him. He later dies after being stabbed by Xiao Dalin in his rebellion with Yelü Yanchage.
- Leo Jiang as Master Nüli
  - Consort Xige's uncle who likes Gao Xun, he is also jealous of Xiao Siwen's power. To secure his position, he, like Gao Xun, joins Yelü Yansage's rebellion. He later dies after getting a fire-archery shot by Yelü Xiuge.
- A Sihan as Yelü Molugu, Yelü Hugu's son and Xiao Yanyan's rejected suitor.
  - Xue Hanyu as young Yelü Molugu
- Han Dong as Yelü Hugu
  - Yelü Molugu's father who later killed by Han Derang after try to killed the Dowager Empress Yanyan.
- Xiao Moge as Yelü Longxian, King of Ping
- Chen Tao as Yelü Shao, King of Wu
- Zhang Jinyuan as Shi Fang, Prime Minister of Beifu.
- Guo Jun as Yelü Chage, King Taining
  - One of Yelü Yansage's person who helps him in killed the former Emperor Yelü Ruan.
- Zhao Qiang as Yelü Xidi
- Hou Zhuyuan as Liu Zigu
- Tian Kai as Yelü Xianshi, Envoy of the North Privy Council.
- Jin Youming as Yelü Sha, Prime minister of Nanfu.

==== Maids ====
- Zhang Gong as Diligu, an Imperial Physician.
- Huang Hai as Shuanggu
- Mu Leen as Liang Ge, Xiao Yanyan's attendant after entered palace.
- Yu Menghan as Qing Ge, Xiao Yanyan's attendant who gives a poisonous alcohol to Han Derang and Li Si. She later saved by Xiao Hunian, Yanyan's oldest sister.
- Han Shuo as Xinning, Han Derang's loyal bodyguard
- Li Yizhen as An Xi, Xiao Hunian's attendant.
- Cao Feiran as Fu Hui, Xiao Hunian's attendant.
- Zhang Qiaoqiao as Chong Jiu, Xiao Wuguili's attendant who killed by Yelü Xiyin.
- Ma Mengqiao as Gui Yin, Xiao Wuguili's attendant.
- Fu Fengnan as Po'er, Yelü Xian's eunuch.
- Shi Danjiang as Hu Si, Xiao Siwen's subordinate.
- Yu Hongliang as Gao Liu, Yelü Yansage's subordinate.
- Zhu Feng as Nianmugun, Yelü Yansage's confidant and trusted assistant.
- Rachel Yang as Yun'er, Li Si's maid.
- Katherine Zhao as Fang'er, Li Si's attendant.
- He Long as Salan, Yelü Xiyin's butler.
- Ma Mengqiao as Xiao Wuguli's maid who misunderstood with her due to an incident.
- Meng Zhichao as Hulie
- Ayden Wong as Chu Bu, at first was Yelü Yansage's assistant, but later become Yelü Xian's assistant.
- Patty Hou as Zi Su, Queen of Ji's maid.
- Luo Ning as A Gu, Yelü Xiezhen's bodyguard.
- Xie Shanshan as Tabu, An Zhi's maid who got poisoned by her own.

==== Others ====
- Yang Chen as Bai Hai
- Huang Chengcheng as Ji Geng
- Zhang Keyan as Nai Wanshi
- Henry Han as Xiao Chuoli, Princess of Qin's husband.
- Yin Zeqiang as Shi Lu
- Shen Xuewei as Wang Jizhong
- Yang Di as Li Zha
- Pang Xiandong as Lu Cun
- Zhang Zhenjiang as Lu Duan's father
- Wen Wei as Lu Duan's mother
- Zhou Zixin as Kou Kui
- Da Qing as Tuo Li
- Wilson Wang as Hu Er'bo

==== Rilian Tribe ====
- Huo Zhengyan as Abohe
  - The new head of Rilian Tribe and Han Derang's best friend when he goes to travelling because Derang once save his life.

=== Special appearances ===
- Jin Jia as Yelü Ruan, the former Emperor of Liao who killed by Yelü Jing. He is Yelü Xian, Yelü Zhimo, and Yelü Hugudian's father.
- Zhou Yanyan as Xiao Gu, a Witch Doctor.
- Liu Wei as Liu Jieli
- Chen Qi as Yelü Hou
- Li Tongdong as Xiheshuonu
- Chen Entao as Wanyanyuanke
- Yue Hailong as a Jurchen man
- Liu Shuai as King of Gaoli
- Shi Qiang as King of Bohai
- Wang Rong as King of Zubu
- Jiang Bingwen as Head of Wamo
- Zheng Chen as Head of Shiwei
- Shi Yixuan as Yuwan
- Zhang Zhenjiang as Lu Rui's father
- Shi Danjiang as Husi
- Zhuang Ying as Wuluben

== Soundtrack ==
=== Mainland Chinese ===
No.	Title	Singer	Length
1.	"Yan Yun Tai (燕云台)" (Opening Theme Song)	Henry Huo
2.	"Ruo Yan (若燕)" (Ending Theme Song)	Shang Wenjie
3.	"Soul of Misses (相思魂)"	Tim Yu
4.	"Cold Smoke Rain (冷煙雨)"	Feng Yiyao

=== Hong Kong ===
No.	Title	Lyrics	Singer	Length
1.	"Shui Ren Zai Shen Bian (誰人在身邊)" (Theme Song)	Zhang Meixiang	Joey Wong

== Broadcast ==
Channel	Country	Airing Date	Showing Time
BTV-1	China	November 3, 2020	Everyday at 19:30 pm
WeTV	China	November 3, 2020	Members: Everyday at 19:40 pm Non-members: Everyday at 22:00 (free)
WeTV	Taiwan	November 3, 2020	Members: Everyday at 19:40 pm Non-members: Everyday at 22:00 (free)
myTV SUPER C-Club	Hong Kong	November 3, 2020	Only 4 episodes in the first day (Every 2 episodes update in Saturdays at 22:00 pm)
TVB Anywhere		November 3, 2020	Only 6 episodes in the first day (Every 2 episodes update in Saturdays at 22:00 pm)
Astro GO	Malaysia; Brunei	December 1, 2020	Only 6 episodes in the first day (Every 1 episode update at 22:00 pm)
TVB Jade	Hong Kong	January 4, 2021	Every Mondays–Fridays at 20:30–21:30; Every Saturdays at 20:30–22:30 (2 episodes); Every Sundays at 20:30–21:30 (Cantonese dubbing)
Astro AOD and Astro AOD HD	Malaysia	December 28, 2020	Every Mondays–Fridays at 20:30–21:30; Every Saturdays at 20:30–22:30 (2 episodes); Every Sundays at 20:30–21:30 (Cantonese dubbing)
TVB Jade	Malaysia	December 28, 2020	Every Mondays–Fridays at 20:30–21:30; Every Saturdays at 20:30–22:30 (2 episodes); Every Sundays at 20:30–21:30 (Cantonese dubbing)
TVB Jade	Philippines; Singapore; Malaysia	December 28, 2020	Every Mondays–Fridays at 20:30–21:30; Every Saturdays at 20:30–22:30 (2 episodes); Every Sundays at 20:30–21:30 (Cantonese dubbing)
TVB Jade	Singapore	December 28, 2020	Every Mondays–Fridays at 20:30–21:30; Every Saturdays at 20:30–22:30 (2 episodes); Every Sundays at 20:30–21:30 (Cantonese dubbing)
HUB Drama First	Singapore	December 28, 2020	Every Mondays–Fridays at 20:30–21:30; Every Saturdays at 20:30–22:30 (2 episodes); Every Sundays at 20:30–21:30 (Cantonese dubbing)
TVB Anywhere	European Union	December 28, 2020	Every Mondays–Fridays at 20:30–21:30; Every Saturdays at 20:30–22:30 (2 episodes); Every Sundays at 20:30–21:30 (Cantonese dubbing)
Fairchild TV2 HD	Canada	December 28, 2020	Every Mondays–Fridays at 16:30–17:30; Every Saturdays at 14:00–16:00 (2 episodes, Cantonese dubbing)
Fairchild TV2 HD	Canada	December 28, 2020	Every Mondays–Fridays at 19:30–20:30; Every Saturdays at 17:00–19:00 (2 episodes, Cantonese dubbing)
TVB Jade	Australia	December 29, 2020	Every Tuesdays–Saturdays at 20:30–21:30; Every Sundays at 20:30–22:30 (2 episodes); Every Mondays at 20:30–21:30 (2 episodes, Cantonese dubbing)
8TV	Malaysia	October 28, 2021	Every Mondays–Thursdays at 21:00–22:00
