= Xiao Hunian =

- Queen of Qi
- Spouse: Yelü Yansage
Names
- Surname: Xiāo (蕭); Given name: Húniǎn (胡輦) or Héhǎn (和罕)
- Father: Xiao Siwen
- Mother: Yelü Lübugu

Xiao Hunian (Chinese: 蕭胡輦; d. 1007), also known as Hehan (和罕), was a Khitan noble lady of China's Liao dynasty. She was one of the Xiao sisters and the oldest sister of Lady Xiao and Xiao Yanyan.

== History ==
Xiao Hunian was the eldest daughter of Xiao Siwen (萧思溫), Liao's chancellor and Yelü Lübugu, Princess Yan. She had two younger sisters, Xiao Yanyan and Lady Xiao. She married Yelü Yansage, her uncle and the son of Emperor Taizong of Liao.

Her brother-in-law Yelü Xian ascended to the throne as Emperor Jingzong. He promoted Yelü Yansage as the King of Qi, and Xiao Hunian became the Queen of Qi. In the year 972, Yelü Yansage died and Xiao Hunian received the title of Consort Dowager. After her husband died, she took over as head of his army and became the commander in chief of an expeditionary force against border tribes in the west in 994 and led her troops in a campaign against the Xi Xia, where she was credited with the establishment of the northwestern city of Kodun.

She later married Han Yu, however, Han Yu died in 987. Xiao Hunian, now widowed, served as a spy against Song during the reign of her nephew Emperor Shengzong. During her military journeys, she fell in love with a slave named Talan A'bo (挞览阿钵). Her relationship with him was not supported by Xiao Yanyan, and their relationship was further estranged. Xiao Yanyan did not have a good relationship with their second sister, Lady Xiao, either. Lady Xiao's husband Yelü Xiyin had been murdered, and Lady Xiao had tried to poison Xiao Yanyan, but was instead forced to commit suicide. Despite her pleas to save Lady Xiao, Xiao Hunian was imprisoned, then sentenced to death by Xiao Yanyan.

== In popular culture ==
- Portrayed by Charmaine Sheh in the 2020 Chinese television series The Legend of Xiao Chuo.
