= Jing Chao =

Chinese actor

- Born: 15 April 1986 (age 40); Shanghai, China
- Education: Beijing Film Academy
- Occupation: Actor
- Years active: 2009–present
- Agent: 18 Artists Management
- Height: 1.85 m (6 ft 1 in)
- Spouse: Li Jialin (Li Lin) (m. 2014)
- Children: 2

Chinese name
- Simplified Chinese: 经超
Transcriptions

Jing Chao (Chinese: 经超, born 15 April 1986) is a Chinese actor.

== Life ==
Jing was born in Shanghai, China on 15 April 1986. He graduated from Beijing Film Academy. He married actress Li Jialin (李佳璘), also known as Li Lin, in 2014. They have two children.

== Career ==
In 2009, Jing Chao starred in the modern romance drama Love With My Former Wife, and became known for his role as "Jiao Yin". He then made his film debut in the psychological thriller Case Sensitive in 2011.

In 2013, Jing was cast as the leading role in the youth police drama Sunshine Police.

In 2014, Jing became known for his role in the crime thriller web drama Death Notify.

In 2015, Jing played lead roles in the science fiction web drama Falling Down, and military drama Youth Assemble.

In 2016, Jing starred in the metropolitan drama We Are The Best Ten Years directed by Guan Hu. The same year, he featured in the xianxia drama Chinese Paladin 5, and also starred in the hit spy drama Decoded.

In 2017, Jing played the leading role in the television series Mo Du Feng Yun, a drama about the life of a legendary magician.

In 2018, Jing starred in the modern romance drama Here to Heart. He then starred in the crime web series Medical Examiner Dr. Qin as the lead character, Qin Ming. The same year, he gained increased recognition and popularity with his role as Ling Yunche in the historical fiction drama Ruyi's Royal Love in the Palace.

In 2019, Jing starred in the historical romance drama Princess Silver. The same year, he was cast in the historical drama The Legend of Xiao Chuo, portraying Yelü Xian.

== Filmography ==
=== Film ===
Year	English title	Chinese title	Role	Notes
2011	Case Sensitive	敏感事件	Luo Xiaoni's boyfriend	

=== Television series ===
Year	English title	Chinese title	Role	Notes
2009	Love With My Former Wife	跟我的前妻谈恋爱	Jiao Yin	
2010	Jiang Jie	江姐	Xie Yunting	
2010	Mother's Heart	母亲心		
2011	Pretty Housewife	漂亮主妇	Hao Shuai	
2012	Arrows on the Bowstring	箭在弦上	Zhao Hua	
2014	Endless Love	高山青	Bao Yuntian	
2014	Death Notify	暗黑者	Yin Jian	
2015	Youth Assemble	青春集结号	Ren Tianxing	
2015	Liao Zhai	聊斋新编	Xue Yong	
2015	Falling Down	执念师	Ming Tian	
2016	We Are The Best Ten Years	我们最美好的十年	Fan Yang	
2016	Chinese Paladin 5	仙剑云之凡	Long Ming	
2016	Decoded	解密	Zhao Qirong	
2017	Mo Du Feng Yun	魔都风云	Ye Fei	
2017	Tiger Father Dog Son	我的老爸是奇葩	Chang Tianyi	
2017	Huang Fei Hong	国士无双黄飞鸿	Aisin Gioro Zaizhi	
2018	Here to Heart	温暖的弦	Zhu Linlu	
2018	Sunshine Police	阳光警察	Ou Jie	
2018	Medical Examiner Dr. Qin	法医秦明之幸存者	Qin Ming	
2018	Ruyi's Royal Love in the Palace	如懿传	Ling Yunche	
2019	Princess Silver	白发	Fu Chou	
2020	Burning	燃烧	Gao Feng	
2020	The Legend of Xiao Chuo	燕云台	Yelü Xian	
2021	Dream Garden	沉睡花园	Fan Qi	
TBA	Blood Oath of a Thousand Years	血盟千年		
TBA	Gentlemen Attention Please	先生们，请立正	Xiang Xiaofei	

== Awards and nominations ==
Year	Award	Category	Nominated work	Results	Ref.
2019	Sina Fashion Awards	Gentleman Idol of the Year	—N/a	Won	
2020	7th The Actors of China Award Ceremony	Best Actor (Emerald)	—N/a	Pending	
