= Emperor Xingzong of Liao =

Emperor of the Liao dynasty from 1031 to 1055

Emperor Xingzong of Liao 遼興宗

Emperor of the Liao dynasty
- Reign: 25 June 1031 – 28 August 1055
- Predecessor: Emperor Shengzong
- Successor: Emperor Daozong
- Born: Zhigu (Khitan name); Yelü Zongzhen (sinicised name); 3 April 1016
- Died: 28 August 1055 (aged 39)
- Burial: Yongxing Mausoleum (永興陵, in present-day Bairin Right Banner, Inner Mongolia)
- Spouse: Xiao Dali
Names
- Family name: Yēlǜ (耶律); Khitan given name: Zhīgǔ (只骨); Sinicised given name: Zōngzhēn (宗真)
Era dates
- Jingfu (景福): 1031–1032; Chongxi(重熙): 1032–1055
Posthumous name
- Emperor Shensheng Xiaozhang (神聖孝章皇帝)
Temple name
- Xingzong (興宗)
- House: Yelü
- Dynasty: Liao
- Father: Emperor Shengzong
- Mother: Xiao Noujin

Emperor Xingzong of Liao
- Traditional Chinese: 遼興宗
- Simplified Chinese: 辽兴宗
Transcriptions
Standard Mandarin
- Hanyu Pinyin: Liáo Xīngzōng

Zhigu (Khitan name)
- Chinese: 只骨
Transcriptions
Standard Mandarin
- Hanyu Pinyin: Zhīgǔ

Yelü Zongzhen (sinicised name)
- Chinese: 耶律宗真
Transcriptions
Standard Mandarin
- Hanyu Pinyin: Yēlǜ Zōngzhēn

Emperor Xingzong of Liao (3 April 1016 – 28 August 1055), personal name Zhigu, sinicised name Yelü Zongzhen, was the seventh emperor of the Khitan-led Liao dynasty of China.

== Life ==
Yelü Zongzhen was the eldest son of Emperor Shengzong. He was born to a court lady named Xiao Noujin (蕭耨斤) but was raised by the Empress Xiao Pusage (蕭菩薩哥), the niece of Zongzhen's grandmother Xiao Yanyan. He was enfeoffed as a prince in 1021 at the age of six. When Emperor Shengzong died in 1031, Yelü Zongzhen succeeded his father as emperor. His mother Xiao Noujin became consort dowager and his adopted mother Xiao Pusage became Empress Dowager.

After receiving this title, Xiao Noujin became arrogant and gave herself the new title of Empress Dowager despite being a former concubine. She was longtime rivals with Xiao Pusage, and spied on Xiao Pusage several times when Zongzhen was a prince. Xiao Noujin tried persuading her son to get rid of Xiao Pusage, but he refused to comply since Xiao Pusage had no children and raised him as a child. When the Emperor was occupied with a hunting trip, Xiao Noujin sent assassins to murder Xiao Pusage.

The Emperor's reign was controlled by his mother Xiao Noujin. She was very ambitious and did not want her power at court to be diminished. Although she promised Emperor Jingzong to be content with her title of Consort Dowager, she issued a false edict stating that she was an Empress Dowager. She had plans for her younger son Zhongyuan to replace Zongzhen on the throne. Yelu Zhongyuan told his brother, and Xiao Noujin was sent away from the palace. After the Emperor's death, Xiao Noujin reportedly told her daughter-in-law Empress Xiao Dali not to mourn.

== Legacy ==
The Sinified form of his personal name is usually given as the reason (via the Chinese naming taboo) for the variant forms of the Chinese name of the Jurchens around this time. More likely, however, the variants—which are also attested in other languages of the era lacking such a taboo—simply reflect dialectal differences among the Jurchens themselves.

Emperor Xingzong's reign was the beginning of the end for the Liao dynasty. The government was corrupt and the army started to fall apart. He attacked the Western Xia dynasty many times, and waged war against the Northern Song dynasty. However, the frequent wars were not looked kindly upon by his people, and there were much anger among them for the high taxes. Although Emperor Xingzong was successful in bullying Song into raising the annual indemnities, he was unsuccessful in his invasion of Western Xia due to sandstorms. Emperor Xingzong was interested in Buddhism and spent lavishly for his own pleasure. He died in 1055 and was succeeded by his son Emperor Daozong.

== Family ==
Consort and issue(s):

- Empress Renyi of the Xiao clan (仁懿皇后 蕭氏, d. 1076), personal name Dali (撻里)
  - Yelü Hongji, Emperor Daozong (遼道宗 耶律洪基, 14 September 1032 – 12 February 1101), 1st son
  - Yelü Heluwo, Imperial Uncle Rensheng (仁聖皇太叔 耶律和魯斡, 1041 – 1010), 3rd son
  - Yelü Alian, Prince of Qin (秦國王 耶律阿璉, d. 1087), 4th son
  - Princess of Jin State (晉國公主), personal name Baqin (跋芹), 1st daughter
    - Married Xiao Saba (蕭撒八)
    - Married Xiao Asu (蕭阿速)
    - Married Xiao Woni (蕭窩匿)
  - Princess of Zheng (鄭國公主), personal name Wolitai (斡里太), 2nd daughter
    - Married Xiao Yuliye (蕭余里也)
- Noble Consort, of the Xiao clan(貴妃 蕭氏), personal name Sanqian (三蒨) – No issue
- Unknown
  - Yelü Baoxinnu (耶律寶信奴, b. 1035), 2nd son

Emperor Xingzong of Liao House of Yelü (916–1125) Born: 1016 Died: 1055
Regnal titles
Preceded by Emperor Shengzong	Emperor of the Liao dynasty 1031–1055	Succeeded by Emperor Daozong
