= Yelü Yansage =

- Prince of Qi
- Born: 935
- Died: 972
- Spouse: Xiao Hunian
Posthumous name
- Crown Prince Qinjing (欽靖皇太叔)
- Father: Emperor Taizong
- Mother: Xiao Wen

Yelü Yansage (Chinese: 耶律罨撒葛; 935–972), posthumous name Crown Prince Qinjing (欽靖皇太叔), was a prince of the Liao dynasty of China. He was the second son of Emperor Taizong and the second younger brother of Emperor Muzong. After his nephew Emperor Jingzong succeeded to the throne, he was made the Prince of Qi (齊王), and his consort Xiao Hunian became the Princess of Qi. In 972, he died and Xiao Hunian received the title of Consort Dowager. After he died, his consort took over as head of his army and became the commander-in-chief of an expeditionary force against border tribes in the west in 994 and led her troops in a campaign against the Western Xia dynasty, where she was credited with the establishment of the northwestern city of Kodun.

== In popular culture ==
- Portrayed by Tan Kai in the 2020 Chinese TV series The Legend of Xiao Chuo.
