= Princess Xiao =

Lady Xiao
- Princess of Song
- Spouse: Yelü Xiyin
Names
- Family name: Xiāo (蕭); Personal Name: unknown (possibly Yileilan 伊勒兰)
- Father: Xiao Siwen
- Mother: Yelü Lübugu

Lady Xiao, personal name unknown, possibly identified as Yileilan (伊勒兰), was a Khitan noble lady of China's Liao dynasty. She was one of the Xiao sisters along with Xiao Hunian and Xiao Yanyan. She is the wife of Yelü Xiyin, a grandson of the Liao founding emperor Yelü Abaoji (Emperor Taizu).

== History ==
Lady Xiao was the second daughter of Xiao Siwen (蕭思溫), Liao's chancellor and Yelü Lübugu, Princess Yan. She had two sisters, Xiao Yanyan and Xiao Hunian. She married Yelü Xiyin (耶律喜隱), the son of former Crown Prince Yelü Lihu.

In 960, Yelü Xiyin plotted a rebellion against then-reigning Emperor Muzong (Emperor Taizong's son Yelü Jing). As a result, both he and Yelü Lihu were arrested and placed in jail. Yelü Lihu died in jail, but Yelü Xiyin was subsequently released after Lady Xiao's brother-in-law Yelü Xian ascended to the throne as Emperor Jingzong.

However, Yelü Xiyin later planned another rebellion against Emperor Jingzong. He was captured, and his son with Lady Xiao was murdered by Liao troops. Seeking revenge for her husband and son, Lady Xiao attempted to poison the then Empress Dowager Xiao Yanyan. She failed, and was forced to commit suicide.

== Media portrayal ==
- Portrayed as Xiao Wuguili by Lu Shan in the 2020 Chinese television series The Legend of Xiao Chuo.
