= Xiao Noujin =

- Grand Empress Dowager

Regent of Liao dynasty
- Monarch: Emperor Xingzong of Liao
- Died: 24 January 1058
- Spouse: Yelü Longxu
- Issue: Yelü Zongzhen; Yelü Yanmu; Yelü Shuogu; Yelü Zhongyuan
Names
- Family name: Xiāo (蕭); Khitan name: Noujin (耨斤)
Regnal name
- Grand Empress Dowager Fatian
Posthumous name
- Empress Qinai

Xiao Noujin (蕭耨斤; 980? – 24 January 1058) was a Khitan empress dowager of China's Liao dynasty. She was a concubine of Emperor Shengzong, the mother of Emperor Xingzong, and one of the three Liao grand empresses dowager. She had great influence after the accession of her son the throne in 1031.

== Background ==
Xiao Noujin was born into poverty, but Yelü Longxu brought her into the palace. However, he never treated her as a concubine but instead gave her to his mother Xiao Yanyan as a court lady. One day while cleaning Xiao Yanyan's bed, she stumbled upon a golden rooster. When Xiao Yanyan suddenly entered the tent, Xiao Noujin was startled and swallowed the golden rooster. The golden rooster was actually a mysterious medicine, and after a few days Xiao Noujin's skin became radiant. Xiao Yanyan was very surprised and told her court lady that she would give birth to a prince in the future.

== Concubine ==
Xiao Yanyan told her son to share the same bedchamber as Xiao Noujin. In the second month of 1016, Xiao Noujin gave birth to a son whose name was originally Mubugu (木不孤) but later changed to Yelü Zongzhen (耶律宗真). She also gave birth to two daughters, Yelü Yanmu (耶律岩母) and Yelü Shuogu (耶律槊古), and later another son Yelü Zhongyuan (耶律重元). Yelü Yanmu was made the Princess of Wei, and later the Princess of Qin. Yelü Shuogu was granted the title of Princess of Yue, then Princess of Jin, and married Xiao Xiaozhong (蕭孝忠).

Xiao Noujin was longtime rivals with Xiao Pusage, Emperor Shengzong's second Empress and the niece of Xiao Yanyan. Despite sharing the same clan name Xiao, Xiao Pusage was not related to Xiao Noujin. After Xiao Noujin gave birth to Yelü Zongzhen as a court lady, Xiao Pusage was in charge of raising the child. Xiao Pusage had no children, and raised Yelü Zongzhen as her own, gaining the respect of Emperor Shengzong. Out of jealousy, Xiao Noujin even spied on Xiao Pusage several times when Yelü Zongzhen was still a prince.

== Empress dowager ==
After Emperor Shengzong died in 1031, Yelü Zongzhen succeeded his father as emperor. His mother Xiao Noujin became consort dowager and his adopted mother Xiao Pusage became Empress Dowager. On Emperor Shengzong's deathbed, he gave Xiao Noujin the title of Yuanfei (元妃) which meant Primary Consort. Emperor Shengzong told her to hide her resentment towards Xiao Pusage since Xiao Pusage raised Zongzhen as a child.

After receiving this title, Xiao Noujin instead became arrogant and issued a false edict stating that he had created her an Empress Dowager. She gave herself the new title of Empress Dowager despite being a former concubine. Xiao Noujin tried persuading her son to get rid of her longtime rival Xiao Pusage, but he refused to comply since Xiao Pusage had no children and raised him as a child. When the Emperor was occupied with a hunting trip, Xiao Noujin sent assassins to murder Xiao Pusage. Xiao Pusage told the assassins she was innocent, and told them she was going to take a bath. The assassins waited, but soon realized that the Empress Dowager had committed suicide.

Xiao Noujin was corrupt, and in charge of military power. She established her own holiday, Holy Day (應聖節) based on her birthday. She gave her great-grandfather the honorable title of Prince of Lanling (蘭陵郡王), father the title of King of Qi (齊國王) and made her brothers kings, disregarding Liao rules. Xiao Noujin even helped 40 of her family's slaves become government officials. Her older sister the Lady of Qin (秦國夫人) was widowed and lonely. The Lady of Qin felt attracted to the King of Changsha Xie Jianu (謝家奴), but he already was married. Xiao Noujin killed his wife and married him to her sister the Lady of Qin. Her younger sister the Lady of Jin (晉國夫人) was enamored with an envoy named Geng Yuanji (耿元吉). Geng Yuanji was also married, so Xiao Noujin killed his wife and again married him to the Lady of Jin.

Xiao Noujin disrupted Xiao Yanyan and her late husband's reforms and caused turmoil in Liao politics. She was very ambitious and didn't want her power at court to be diminished. She had plans for her younger son Yelü Zhongyuan to replace Yelü Zongzhen on the throne. Yelu Zhongyuan secretly told his brother, and Emperor Xingzong was angered. All of her allies and conspirators were executed, including her attendants and most of her relatives. In 1034, he demoted his mother to commoner status and sent her away from the palace.

== Grand empress dowager ==
After Emperor Xingzong's death, Xiao Noujin was granted permission to return to the palace to visit the funeral. She didn't show any signs of grief or sadness. Her daughter-in-law Empress Xiao Dali was crying for her late husband, but Xiao Noujin told Xiao Dali she was young and to stop mourning over Emperor Xingzong.

Her grandson Yelü Hongji ascended to the throne as Emperor Daozong of Liao in 1055. Xiao Noujin was granted the title of Grand Empress Dowager. In January 1058, Xiao Noujin died and was posthumously granted the title of Empress Qin'ai (欽哀皇后). Her funeral was attended by envoys from Western Xia and Goryeo.
