= Xiao Yanyan =

- Empress Dowager Chengtian
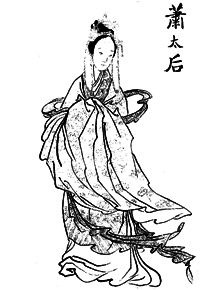
- from one 1892 print of the novel Legends of Generals of the Yang Family (楊家將傳) (Note: Essentially the same novel, with slight modifications by publishers and editors, as the second half of the Records of the Two Songs, South and North (兩宋南北志傳) written by Xiong Damu (熊大木) in the late 16th century.)

Regent of the Liao dynasty
- Regency: 13 October 982 – 23 December 1009
- Monarch: Emperor Shengzong (son)
- Born: 953
- Died: 29 December 1009 (aged 55–56)
- Spouse: Yelü Xian (Emperor Jingzong)
- Issue: Yelü Longxu (Emperor Shengzong), son; Yelü Longqing (耶律隆慶), son; Yelü Longyou (耶律隆祐), son; Yelü Guanyinnü (耶律觀音女), daughter; Yelü Changshounü (耶律長壽女), daughter; Yelü Yanshounü (耶律延壽女), daughter
Names
- Family name: Xiāo (蕭); Khitan name: Yanyan (燕燕); Chinese name: Xiāo Chuò (蕭綽)
Regnal name
- Empress Dowager Ruìdé Shénlüè Yìngyùn QĬhuà Chéngtiān (睿德神略應運啟化承天皇太后)
Posthumous name
- Empress Shèngshén Xuānxiàn (聖神宣獻皇后); Empress Ruìzhì (睿智皇后)
- Father: Xiao Siwen
- Mother: Yelü Lübugu

Xiao Yanyan (Chinese: 蕭燕燕; 953 – 29 December 1009), also known as Empress Dowager Chengtian (承天皇太后), was a Khitan empress and military leader of the Liao dynasty of China. She was regent on behalf of her son from 982.

== History ==
Xiao Yanyan was the third child of Xiao Siwen (蕭思溫), Liao's chancellor. Also referred to by the name Xiao Chuo, Xiao's original Khitan family name was Bali (拔裏氏). She was the youngest of the Xiao sisters, after Xiao Hunian and Lady Xiao.

Xiao married Emperor Jingzong of Liao and gave birth to crown Prince Yelü Longxu. As Empress, Xiao was influential during her husband's reign.

She became regent for her son in 982 when he ascended the throne as Emperor Shengzong, aged 12, after Emperor Jingzong of Liao died while returning from a hunting trip.

Khitan culture permitted women to take part in military action and to be military commanders; Xiao became a military commander of great renown. In 986, the Song dynasty to the south under the leadership of Emperor Taizong invaded the Liao Empire, but was defeated by Liao forces under Xiao's command; she commanded the troops herself on the front line of the battle. They routed the Song soldiers and captured thousands, who Xiao pardoned as it was her birthday. A further invasion by the Song in 989 was again defeated by Liao forces and resulted in the death of Song general Yang Ye.

In her personal life, Empress Dowager Chengtian had an accepted, spouse-like relationship with Han Derang, her advisor and commander of the Northern Chancellery. She had originally been betrothed to Han before the imperial clan's interference, and had had a child with him. Song ambassador Lu Zhen said Chengtian appeared to be about 50 years old, wore a kingfisher feather cap and jade pendants in her ears, and sat on a stack of cushions on a chair. She had a dozen or so female Khitan attendants tending to her. Lu also saw a boy about 10 years old playing in front of her who resembled Han Derang. Lu speculated this was their son. The History of the Khitan Kingdom states that while serving as regent, Chengtian asked Han to resume their relationship and they copulated many times, had Han's wife poisoned, and produced a son.

As Empress Dowager Chengtian, Xiao commanded her own army of 10,000 cavalry and personally lead the Liao army in battle against the Song in 1005, despite being over 50 years old.

Known for her skills in civil administration, Empress Dowager Chengtian retained influence until her death at age 57 in 1009. Chinese chronicles, such as The History of the Liao, credit most of the success of Emperor Shengzong's reign to his mother, Chengtian.

She was instrumental in arranging a marriage between her son and her court lady, Xiao Noujin. She had a poor relationship with her two older sisters, and poisoned or murdered them both.

== Modern references ==
=== Film and television ===
- Portrayed by Mu Qing in the 1995 Chinese movie Great Liao's Empress Dowager.
- Portrayed by Shim Hye-jin in the 2009 Korean TV series Empress Cheonchu.
- Portrayed by Mei Lier in the 2019 Chinese movie Battle Between Song and Liao Dynasties (大破天门阵).
- Portrayed by Tiffany Tang in the 2020 Chinese TV series The Legend of Xiao Chuo.

=== Literature ===
- She is also portrayed as an antagonist in many Generals of the Yang Family adaptations.
