= Emperor Shengzong of Liao =

Emperor of the Liao dynasty from 982 to 1031

Emperor Shengzong of Liao 遼聖宗

Emperor of the Liao dynasty
- Reign: 14 October 982 – 25 June 1031
- Predecessor: Emperor Jingzong
- Successor: Emperor Xingzong
- Born: Wenshunu (Khitan name); Yelü Longxu (sinicised name); 16 January 972
- Died: 25 June 1031 (aged 59)
- Burial: Yongqing Mausoleum (永慶陵, in present-day Bairin Right Banner, Inner Mongolia)
- Empress: Xiao Pusage
- Concubine: See § Family
- Issue: See § Family
Names
- Family name: Yēlǜ (耶律); Khitan given name: Wénshùnú (文殊奴); Sinicised given name: Lóngxù (隆緒)
Era dates
- Qianheng (乾亨; 982); Tonghe (統和; 983–1012); Kaitai (開泰; 1012–1021); Taiping (太平; 1021–1031)
Regnal name
- Emperor Tianfu (天輔皇帝)
Posthumous name
- Emperor Wenwu Daxiao Xuan (文武大孝宣皇帝)
Temple name
- Shengzong (聖宗)
- House: Yelü
- Dynasty: Liao
- Father: Emperor Jingzong
- Mother: Xiao Chuo

Emperor Shengzong of Liao
- Traditional Chinese: 遼聖宗
- Simplified Chinese: 辽圣宗
Transcriptions
Standard Mandarin
- Hanyu Pinyin: Liáo Shèngzōng

Wenshunu (Khitan name)
- Chinese: 文殊奴
Transcriptions
Standard Mandarin
- Hanyu Pinyin: Wénshùnú

Yelü Longxu (sinicised name)
- Traditional Chinese: 耶律隆緒
- Simplified Chinese: 耶律隆绪
Transcriptions
Standard Mandarin
- Hanyu Pinyin: Yēlǜ Lóngxù

Emperor Shengzong of Liao (16 January 972 – 25 June 1031), personal name Wenshunu, sinicised name Yelü Longxu, was the sixth emperor of the Khitan-led Chinese Liao dynasty and its longest reigning monarch.

== Conflict with the Northern Song dynasty ==
Emperor Shengzong succeeded his father, Emperor Jingzong, at the age of 12 in 982. As he was too young to rule at the time, his mother, Empress Dowager Xiao, became the regent.

Emperor Taizong of the Northern Song dynasty sought to take advantage of the situation by launching an invasion on the Liao dynasty's southern capital (present-day Beijing) in the contentious Sixteen Prefectures in 986. Three large Song armies were sent to three different strategic locations on the approach to the southern capital. While initially successful, the young Emperor Shengzong, along with Empress Dowager Xiao, led an army of Liao cavalry to counter the enemy and defeated the Song forces at the Battle of the Qigou Pass in June. Empress Dowager Xiao appointed Yelü Xiuge as her senior general to continue attacks on the Song dynasty in retaliation until the following year.

In 1004, the Liao dynasty carried out a large-scale invasion of Song territory, camping out in the town of Shanyuan, about 100 miles north of the Song capital of Kaifeng. This resulted in the Treaty of Shanyuan, signed in mid-January 1005. According to this treaty, the Song dynasty would pay an annual tribute of 200,000 bolts of silk and 100,000 taels of silver to the Liao dynasty in exchange for peace. This arrangement would remain in place with modifications until the end of the Liao dynasty, and in fact, the Jurchens could continue this arrangement with the Song dynasty with the founding of their Jin dynasty.

The caitiff government is very harsh, and [the people of ] You and Ji abhor it. The land tax designated for mulberry tree [plots] is several times that of the Central Kingdom. [Even during times of ] natural disasters such as floods, droughts, or insect infestations, there is no reduction or elimination [of the taxes]. Under these conditions, ten men from an agriculturalist family hoeing together still cannot provide refined and unmixed food for the elderly, and ten diligent sericulturalist spinning women together still cannot provide padded silken clothing for the elderly. In tax collection and in conscription, [the Kitan government] is more pressing than plunderers and robbers. What is more, the Yelü, Xiao, and Han clans are debauched and tyrannical. They periodically seek out the children of good families as wives and concubines. The parents of beautiful girls in You and Ji do not allow [their daughters] to apply their white powder; instead, they clothe them shabbily and hide them away. [After] they marry they do not [again] associate with their close relations.

— Lu Zhen, a Song envoy to Liao in 1009, describing the conditions of Chinese subjects under Khitan rule

== Examination system ==
Emperor Shengzong also institutionalised state examinations for the selection of officials, which was done in 988, based on models used by the Han Chinese-led Tang and Song dynasties. Despite the importance of the return of the examination system, it initially only opened the road for very small numbers, as only three to five were awarded initially, and the number only increased to between 30 and 130 candidates passing the triennial exams by 1014.

Most jinshi degree holders were not even appointed to office, as Khitan aristocrats were far more likely to receive appointments. Khitan people receiving appointments did so specifically through patronage, as they were expressly prohibited from taking the examinations.

== Spread of Buddhism ==
Emperor Shengzong began the active patronage of Buddhism, rebuilding temples such as the Monastery of Solitary Joy. Within a century of his reign, an estimated 10% of the Liao population were Buddhist monks or nuns, though this figure may have been exaggerated. While the Khitans did not associate Buddhism with the Chinese people because it was seen more as a Uyghur religion and thus not the religion of the Chinese, whom they saw as inferior, what is not clear is the extent that Buddhism penetrated the Khitan population, as the bulk of Buddhist shrines and temples were located in the southern part of the domains of the Liao where the largely Chinese sedentary population resided. There is evidence to suggest that the Khitan populace maintained their animistic belief systems along with their rituals.

== Innovations ==
During the rule of Emperor Shengzong, the Liao dynasty instituted feudal reform, spurring its economy. Prior to this, it had depended on territorial expansion, slavery and thievery. Under Emperor Shengzong's rule, most slaves were liberated, becoming normal members of society. The most important parts of the economy from then on were animal husbandry, particularly horse and sheep raising, as well as agriculture and fishing. During Emperor Shengzong's reign, the Liao dynasty enjoyed peace and prosperity, so it is widely praised that Emperor Shengzong's reign was a golden age of the Liao dynasty

== Family ==
Consort and issue(s):

- Empress Rende, of the Xiao clan (仁德皇后 蕭氏; 983–1032), personal name (菩薩哥), a niece of Empress Ruizhi
  - Unnamed Prince, 2nd son
  - Unnamed Prince, 3rd son
- Empress Qin'ai, of the Xiao clan (欽哀皇后 蕭氏; d. 1057), personal name Noujin (耨斤)
  - Yelü Zongzhen, Emperor Xingzong of Liao (耶律宗真; 1016–1055), 4th son
  - Yelü Zongyuan, Prince of Qin (秦國王 耶律宗元; 1021–1063), 6th son
  - Princess Zhang of Qin State (秦國長公主 耶律岩母堇), personal name Yanmuqin (岩母堇), 2nd daughter
    - Married Xiao Zhuobu (蕭浞卜)
    - Married Xiao Haili (蕭海里)
    - Married Xiao Hudu (蕭胡覩)
    - Married Xiao Hui (蕭惠) and had issue (one son)
  - Princess of Yue State (越國公主), personal name Shuogu (槊古), 3rd daughter
    - Married Xiao Xiaozhong (蕭孝忠) and had issue (Xiao Guanyin)
- Noble Consort Xiao, of the Xiao clan (廢后蕭氏)
- Noble Consort Xiao, of the Xiao clan (貴妃 蕭氏; 970–993), daughter of Xiao Pai (蕭排)
  - Unnamed Prince
  - Princess of Qin (秦國公主, b. 990), personal name Yange (燕哥), 1st daughter
    - Married Xiao Pili (蕭匹里) in 1012 and had issue (five sons and six daughters).
  - Unnamed daughter
- Virtuous Consort Xiao, of the Xiao clan (德妃 蕭氏; d. 1017)
- Liyi, of the Ma clan (麗儀 馬氏)
  - Princess Xunyang (潯陽公主), personal name Jiuge (九哥), 7th daughter
    - married Xiao Lian (蕭璉) in 1017
- Shuyi, of the Geng clan (淑儀 耿氏)
  - Yelü Zongyuan, Prince of Beiyuan (北院大王 耶律宗願; 1008–1072), 10th son
- Zhaoyi, of the Bai clan (昭儀 白氏)
  - Princess Tongchang (同昌公主), personal name Bage (八哥), 9th daughter
    - married Liu Sangu (劉三嘏)
  - Princess Sanhe (三河郡主), personal name Shige (十哥), 10th daughter
    - married Xiao Gaojiu (蕭高九)
  - Princess Renshou (仁寿縣主), personal name Baishi (擘失), 11th daughter
    - married Liu Siduan (劉四端)
  - Princess Yelü (耶律公主), personal name Taige (泰哥), 12th daughter
    - married Xiao Hulie (蕭忽烈)
- Shunyi of the Li clan (順儀 李氏)
  - Princess Jinxiang (金鄉郡主), personal name Saige (賽哥), 13th daughter
    - married Xiao Tuyu (蕭圖玉)
- Fangyi, of the Ai clan (芳儀 艾氏)
  - Princess Yelü (耶律公主), personal name Xingge (興哥), 14th daughter
    - married Xiao Wangliu (蕭王六)
- Heyi, of the Puhai clan (和儀 仆槐氏)
  - Yelü Zongxun (耶律宗訓), 8th son
  - Yelü Zongwei, Prince of Liang (梁王 耶律宗偉), 9th son
- Lady, of the Xiao clan (萧氏)
  - Princess Nanyang (南陽公主, b. 1130), personal name Cuiba (崔八), 4th daughter
    - married Xiao Xiaoxian (蕭孝先)
  - Princess Zhangning (長寧公主), personal name Taoge (陶哥), 5th daughter
    - married Xiao Yangliu (蕭楊六)
- Lady, of the Xiao clan (蕭氏)
  - Princess of Jing State (荆國公主), personal name Dianni (鈿匿), 6th daughter
    - married Ciao Shuanggu (蕭雙古)
- Lady, of the Da clan (大氏)
  - Princess Linhai (臨海縣主), personal name Changshou (長壽), 8th daughter
    - married Dali Qiu (大力秋) of Bohai
    - married Xiao Gu (蕭古)
- Unknown
  - Yelu Fubaonu (耶律佛寶奴, b. 988), 1st son
  - Yelu Shusi (耶律屬思, b.1017), 5th son
  - Yelü Zongjian, Prince of Liucheng (柳城郡王 耶律宗簡; d. 1050), 7th son

== In popular culture ==
- Portrayed by Jang Dong-jik and Oh Gun-woo in the 2009 KBS2 TV series Empress Cheonchu.
- Portrayed by Chen Hao, Cary Ye and Leo Pei in the 2020 Chinese TV series The Legend of Xiao Chuo.
- Portrayed by Kim Hyuk in the 2023~2024 KBS2 TV series Korea-Khitan War.

== Notes ==
Emperor Shengzong of Liao House of Yelü (916–1125) Born: 972 Died: 1031
Regnal titles
| Preceded by Emperor Jingzong | Emperor of the Liao Dynasty; 982–1031 | Succeeded by Emperor Xingzong |
