= Emperor Jingzong of Liao =

Liao dynasty emperor from 969 to 982

Emperor Jingzong of Liao 遼景宗

Emperor of the Liao dynasty
- Reign: 13 March 969 – 13 October 982
- Predecessor: Emperor Muzong
- Successor: Emperor Shengzong
- Born: Yelü Xian; 1 September 948
- Died: 13 October 982 (aged 34)
- Burial: Qianling Mausoleum (乾陵, in present-day Beizhen, Jinzhou, Liaoning)
- Empress: Xiao Yanyan
- Concubine: Consort Bohai (渤海妃)
- Issue: Yelü Longxu; Yelü Longqing; Yelü Longyou; Yelü Yaoshinu; Yelü Guanyinnü; Yelü Changshounü; Yelü Yanshounü; Yelü Shuge
Era dates
- Baoning (保寧; 969–979); Qianheng (乾亨; 979–982)
Regnal name
- Emperor Tianzan (天贊皇帝)
Posthumous name
- Emperor Xiaocheng Kangjing (孝成康靖皇帝)
Temple name
- Jingzong (景宗)
- House: Yelü
- Dynasty: Liao
- Father: Emperor Shizong
- Mother: Xiao Sagezhi

Emperor Jingzong of Liao
- Traditional Chinese: 遼景宗
- Simplified Chinese: 辽景宗
Transcriptions
Standard Mandarin
- Hanyu Pinyin: Liáo Jǐngzōng

Yelü Xian
- Traditional Chinese: 耶律賢
- Simplified Chinese: 耶律贤
Transcriptions
Standard Mandarin
- Hanyu Pinyin: Yēlǚ Xián

Xianning (courtesy name)
- Traditional Chinese: 賢寧
- Simplified Chinese: 贤宁
Transcriptions
Standard Mandarin
- Hanyu Pinyin: Xiánníng

Emperor Jingzong of Liao (1 September 948 – 13 October 982), personal name Yelü Xian, courtesy name Xianning, was the fifth emperor of the Khitan-led Liao dynasty of China. He improved government efficiency and reduced corruption. He was known for going to war with the Northern Song dynasty. He died during a hunting trip and his wife later served as regent over his still 11-year-old son, the later Emperor Shengzong.

== Life ==
Yelü Xian succeeded Emperor Muzong in 969 after the latter was murdered by his servants during a hunting trip. He had support from both the Khitan and Han ruling elites.

Yelü Xian, who would come to be known as Emperor Jingzong made several important contributions to the Liao dynasty. He employed ethnic Han officials in his government, appointing one as the Minister of Southern Affairs and as the Duke of Qin. This allowed the government to run more efficiently and sped up the transformation of Khitan society into a feudal society. He cracked down on corruption in the government, firing those who were bribed or was incompetent. Emperor Jingzong also accepted criticisms willingly. He stopped hunting frequently after an official made a connection between hunting and Emperor Muzong's death. Later, Emperor Jingzong began to prepare war against his southern neighbours.

His conflict with the Northern Song dynasty happened when the Song invaded the Northern Han dynasty. However, the Liao reinforcements were destroyed by a Song army, and the Song later destroyed Northern Han. The Song army followed up the victory with an attack on Beijing, the Liao dynasty's southern capital. However, the Liao army completely routed the Song army, with Emperor Taizong of Song fleeing the battlefield. Several battles followed, with a stalemate between the Liao and Song dynasties.

At one point, Emperor Jingzong's body became weak and he had many diseases, sometimes unable to stand up during court proceedings. This led his wife, Xiao Yanyan to manage the great national story.

On 13 October, 982, Emperor Jingzong died due to sickness during a hunting trip in his camp. According to his testament, he was succeeded by his son Emperor Shengzong (982–1031), but since Shengzong was only 11 years old, Xiao Yanyan served as regent.

== Family ==
Consort and issue(s):

- Empress Ruizhi, of the Xiao clan (睿智皇后 蕭氏, 953 – 1009); personal name Yanyan (燕燕), Jingzong's second cousin
  - Princess of Qi (齊國公主, 969–1045), personal name Guanyinnü (觀音女), 1st daughter
    - Married Xiao Jixian (蕭繼先) and had issue (1 son and 2 daughters)
  - Yelü Longxu, Emperor Shengzong (遼聖宗 耶律隆緒, 16 January 972 – 25 June 1031), 1st son
  - Yelü Longqing, Imperial Uncle Xiaozhen (孝貞皇太叔 耶律隆慶, 973–1016), 2nd son
  - Princess of Wei (975–1017) (衛國公主, 975–1017), personal name Changshounü (長壽女), 2nd daughter
    - Married Xiao Paiya (蕭排押) and had issue (2 daughters: Noble Consort Xiao and Princess Consort of Qin and Jin)
  - Princess of Yue (越國公主, 976 – 966), personal name Yanshounü (延壽女), 3rd daughter
    - Married Xiao Hengde (蕭恒德) and had issue (1 son, Xiao Pidi)
  - Yelü Longyou, Prince Xiaojing of Chu (楚孝靖王 耶律隆祐, 979–1012), 3rd son
  - Yelü Zhengge (耶律鄭哥) – disputed.
- Consort, of Bohai (渤海妃)
  - Yelü Shuge (耶律淑哥), 4th daughter
    - Married Lu Jun (盧俊) in 980
    - Married Xiao Shennu (蕭神奴) in 983
- Lady Mou (某氏)
  - Yelü Yaoshinu (耶律藥師奴), 4th son
- Hunian (胡輦) – disputed, became the concubine of his son, Yelu Longxu; No issue.

== In popular culture ==
- Portrayed by Jing Chao in the 2020 Chinese TV series The Legend of Xiao Chuo.

== Sources ==
- Toqto'a; et al. (1344). Liao Shi (遼史) [History of Liao] (in Chinese).
- Twitchett, Denis C.; Tietze, Klaus-Peter (1994). "The Liao". In Twitchett, Dennis; Franke, Herbert (eds.). The Cambridge History of China, Volume 6: Alien Regimes and Border States, 907–1368. Cambridge: Cambridge University Press. pp. 43–153. ISBN 978-0-521-24331-5.

Emperor Jingzong of Liao House of Yelü (916–1125) Born: 948 Died: 982
Regnal titles
Preceded by Emperor Muzong	Emperor of the Liao Dynasty; 969–982	Succeeded by Emperor Shengzong
