= Joey Yung discography =

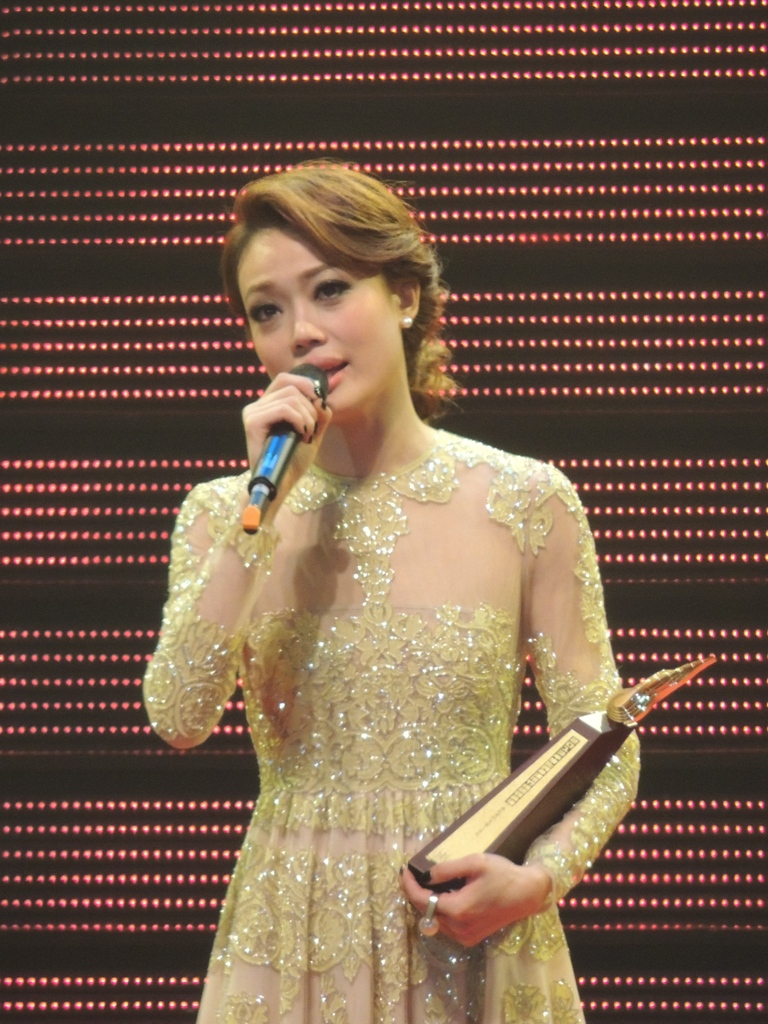
- Yung in 2013
- Studio albums: 25
- Extended plays: 5
- Live albums: 19
- Compilation albums: 7
- Singles: 2

This is the discography of Hong Kong recording artist Joey Yung. She is a seven-time winner of the IFPI Hong Kong Best Selling Female Singer of the Year award (2004–2006, 2008, 2011, 2013–2014). By 2007, Yung had reportedly sold around 4 million albums.

== Albums ==
=== Studio albums ===
==== Cantonese albums ====
| Title | Album details | Peak chart positions | Certifications |
| Title | Album details | HK | Certifications |
|---|---|---|---|
| Who Will Love Me (誰來愛我) | Released: 1 September 2000; Label: EEG; Formats: CD, CD/VCD, cassette | — | IFPI HK: Platinum |
| All Summer Holiday (全身暑假) | Released: 5 June 2001; Label: EEG; Formats: CD, CD/VCD, cassette | — | |
| Solemn on Stage (隆重登場) | Released: 11 October 2001; Label: EEG; Formats: CD, CD/VCD, cassette | — | |
| Something About You | Released: 15 May 2002; Label: EEG; Formats: CD, CD/VCD, cassette | — | IFPI HK: Platinum |
| My Pride (我的驕傲) | Released: 25 March 2003; Label: EEG; Formats: CD, CD/VCD, cassette | — | IFPI HK: Platinum |
| Show Up! | Released: 30 September 2003; Label: EEG; Formats: CD, digital download | — | |
| Nin9 2 5ive | Released: 29 April 2004; Label: EEG; Formats: CD, digital download | — | IFPI HK: Platinum |
| Give Love a Break | Released: 14 October 2004; Label: EEG; Formats: CD, digital download | — | |
| Bi-Heart | Released: 18 August 2005; Label: EEG; Formats: CD, digital download | — | IFPI HK: Platinum |
| Ten Most Wanted | Released: 27 February 2006; Label: EEG; Formats: CD, digital download | — | |
| Close Up | Released: 22 December 2006; Label: EEG; Formats: CD, digital download | — | |
| Glow | Released: 7 November 2007; Label: EEG; Formats: CD, digital download | — | |
| In Motion | Released: 1 September 2008; Label: EEG; Formats: CD, digital download | — | |
| A Time for Us | Released: 30 April 2009; Label: EEG; Formats: CD, digital download | — | IFPI HK: Platinum |
| Joey & Joey | Released: 23 September 2011; Label: EEG; Formats: CD, digital download | 1 | |
| Little Day (小日子) | Released: 15 August 2013; Label: EEG; Formats: CD, digital download | 1 | |
| J-Pop | Released: 23 June 2016; Label: EEG; Formats: CD, digital download | 1 | |
| Searching For Answers (答案之書) | Released: 19 October 2018; Label: EEG; Formats: CD, digital download | 1 | |
| Schrodinger's Cat (薜丁格的貓) | Released: 17 November 2021; Label: EEG; Formats: CD, digital download | 1 | |

==== Mandarin albums ====
| Title | Album details |
|---|---|
| Honestly (說真的) | Released: 6 December 2001; Label: EEG; Formats: CD, CD/VCD, cassette |
| A Private Love Song (一個人的情歌) | Released: 11 October 2002; Label: EEG; Formats: CD, CD/VCD, cassette |
| Lonely Portrait (獨照) | Released: 17 December 2003; Label: EEG; Formats: CD, CD/VCD, cassette |
| Jump Up – 9492 | Released: 21 July 2006; Label: EEG, Rock Records; Formats: CD, CD+DVD, digital download |
| Little Little (小小) | Released: 21 July 2007; Label: EEG; Formats: CD, digital download |
| Very Busy (很忙) | Released: 14 August 2009; Label: EEG, Ocean Butterflies; Formats: CD, digital download |
| Moment | Released: 18 July 2012; Label: EEG; Formats: CD, digital download |

=== Compilation albums ===
| Title | Album details | Certifications |
|---|---|---|
| Love Joey (喜歡祖兒) | Released: 18 January 2001; Label: EEG | |
| Love Joey 2 (喜歡祖兒2) | Released: 23 October 2002; Label: EEG | IFPI HK: Platinum |
| Love Joey 3 (喜歡祖兒3) | Released: 7 March 2005; Label: EEG | IFPI HK: 2× Platinum |
| Love Joey 4 (喜歡祖兒4) | Released: 25 January 2008; Label: EEG | |
| Hopelessly Romantic Collection | Released: 3 December 2013; Label: EEG | |
| All Delicious Collection | Released: 20 December 2013; Label: EEG | |
| Hundreds of Me (一百個我) | Released: 16 December 2016; Label: EEG | |

== Extended plays ==
| Title | Album details | Peak chart positions | Sales | Certifications |
| Title | Album details | HK | Sales | Certifications |
|---|---|---|---|---|
| Joey EP (未知) | Released: 29 September 1999; Label: EEG; Formats: CD, CD/VCD, cassette | 1 | HK: 130,000 | |
| Don't Miss (不容錯失) | Released: 1 April 2000; Label: EEG; Formats: CD, CD/VCD, cassette | 1 | | IFPI HK: Platinum |
| Joey Ten | Released: 29 January 2010; Label: EEG; Formats: CD, digital download | — | | |
| Airport (空港) | Released: 20 August 2010; Label: EEG; Formats: CD, digital download | 1 | | |
| Me, Re-do | Released: 9 April 2015; Label: EEG; Formats: CD, digital download | 1 | | |
| Love in L.A. | Released: 6 August 2019; Label: EEG; Formats: CD, digital download | — | | |

== Concert albums / karaoke ==
- Joey Yung Xia Shui Li Concert 2000 DVD/VCD (2000)
- Joey Yung Solemn on Stage Live in Concert 2001 CD/VCD/DVD (2002)
- Music Is Live 903 id Club Concert 2002 (2002)
- Love Joey II Karaoke DVD/VCD (2002)
- Joey Yung Live Show Up 2003 CD/VCD/DVD (2004)
- Joey All-Record VCD (2004)
- Joey Yung 'Feel the Pop' Concert Live 2004 CD/VCD/DVD (2004)
- Joey Yung X Hacken Lee The Music Is LIVE 903 Id Club Concert 2004CD/VCD/DVD (2005)
- Love:Joey:Love Karaoke VCD/DVD(2005)
- Let me believe love- Joey Yung X Jeff Chang 2005 CD/VCD/DVD (2005)
- Reflection of Joey's Live 2005 CD/VCD/DVD (2005)
- One Live One Love Concert 2006 CD/VCD/DVD (2006)
- Joey Yung X Leo Ku Juicy Lemon 2006 VCD/DVD (2007)
- Starlight Joey Yung Concert 08 3CD/3VCD/3DVD/4DVD/1Blu-ray Disc(BD) (2008)
- Joey Yung X Anthony Wong 2008 CD/VCD/DVD/Blu-ray Disc (BD) (2008)
- Perfect 10 Live 2009 + Joey Yung Documentary 3DVD+Album/2CD+3DVD+Album (2009)
- Metro Joey The Queen Live Karaoke (2009)
- Joey Yung Concert Number 6 Live 4DVD+Album/3CD+4DVD+Album (2010)
- Metro Joey & Joey Live 2DVD+2CD (2011)
- ageas Joey Yung in Concert 1314 3CD+Album/3DVD+Album (2014)

== Singles ==
| Title | Year | Notes |
|---|---|---|
| "A Song That Will Be Passed Through The Ages" | 2003 | A single written by Nicholas Tse and performed by Joey Yung dedicated to a doctor that died during the SARS pandemic, and all the other medical workers that helped fight this disease. |
| "X'Mas Chihuahua" | 2004 | Promotional single for a massive Coca-Cola campaign in the Christmas season of 2004 in Hong Kong |

- It is not common for Hong Kong singers to release commercial singles, which is why Joey has had only two CD singles despite having many promotional (radio/TV) singles, also known as "plugs" in Hong Kong popular music terminology.
