= 2010 TVB monopoly case =

The 2010 TVB monopoly case (Chinese: 壟斷事件) is a case surrounding Hong Kong television station Television Broadcasts Limited being a monopoly station.

== Background ==
For a long time ATV, the main free over-the-air rival station, have been associated as a pro-Beijing station. This has allowed TVB to gain a substantial lead in ratings and market share. The 2009 Hong Kong Broadcasting Authority forum however, led to complaints about TVB also practicing self-censorship. Since then, major issues of monopoly have come up.

In a 2009 press conference HKRIA announced that they would increase royalty tax to TVB exceeding HK$10 million for music programs. TVB then banned singers from EMI Group, Sony Music, Universal Music and Warner Music Group from participating on the 2009 Jade Solid Gold Best Ten Music Awards Presentation show.

== Case & complaints ==
- TVB imposed unwritten restrictions on artists and singers that deprived ATV an opportunity to hire artists. According to Sing Tao Daily, in the past no music company was willing to use contracts (between TVB and the artists) as evidence against TVB. For example, if a HK artist was interviewed by a competing station like Cable TV Hong Kong, they were forced to speak Mandarin. This gave TVB an advantage as HK is mostly a Cantonese-speaking territory.
- Some of the best RTHK productions were broadcast exclusively on TVB only.
- Many complaints were brought up about singers and artists having to sign contracts to be restricted to TVB. Some cannot appear in other competing stations at all.

== Entertainer responses ==
Some bands like Mr have come out and responded it was better to be doing interviews in Cantonese because their Mandarin skill was not so good. Other artists like Kelly Chen said it would benefit all if music videos could be broadcast on all stations. Jacky Cheung said TVB never had enough time available for music shows. In the past he could appear on Jade Solid Gold and sing for 3 minutes, but now he is limited to 1 minute. He further added that "TVB should just support the people they sign. Currently they have total control, and when they don't get what they want, they talk about whom to kill off." Artists who have tried to avoid legal disputes with TVB would simply turn down invitations to appear on rival stations.

== Aftermath ==
A scandal probe was made by the ICAC on Stephen Chan Chi Wan in early 2010.
