= 2009 Jade Solid Gold Awards =

Hong Kong music awards ceremony

The 2009 Jade Solid Gold Best Ten Music Awards Presentation (Chinese: 2009年度十大勁歌金曲頒獎典禮) was held on January 16, 2010 at the Kowloon Hong Kong Coliseum. It is part of the Jade Solid Gold Best Ten Music Awards Presentation series.

== Special situation ==
This award was particularly controversial with the ongoing HKRIA tax case. Singers from Sony Music, Universal Music and Warner Music Group were not allowed to attend this award show. As a result, the majority of awards went to singers from EEG and other smaller companies.

EMI also no longer represent any local HK singers, since Gold Typhoon took over the domestic division. EMI HK is now present as a copyright agency.

== Top 10 song awards ==
The top 10 songs (十大勁歌金曲) of 2009 are as follows.

Song name in Chinese	Artist
給自己的信	Sherman Chung
搜神記	Joey Yung
如果時間來到	Raymond Lam
金剛經	Denise Ho
地球很危險	Leo Ku
Here We Are	Kary Ng
二缺一	Charlene Choi
借	Stephanie Cheng
原來過得很快樂	Miriam Yeung
可歌可泣	Joey Yung

== Additional awards ==
Award	Song (if available for award)	Recipient
The most popular group (最受歡迎組合獎)	-	(gold) RubberBand
-	-	(silver) Fama
-	-	(bronze) Hotcha
The best newcomer artist (最受歡迎新人獎)	Hit Me	(gold) Kate Tsui
-	-	(silver) Jonathan Wong
-	-	(bronze) Cilla Kung
Outstanding Performance award (傑出表現獎)	All About You	(gold) G.E.M.
-	-	(silver) Charlene Choi
-	-	(bronze) Linda Chung
Newcomer impact award (新人薦場飆星獎)	-	Chita Yu
Best Stage Performance Award	-	Grasshopper
The most popular commercial song (最受歡迎廣告歌曲大獎)	Double Champion (雙冠軍)	Joey Yung
The most popular duet song (最受歡迎合唱歌曲獎)	我的回憶不是我的	(gold) Vincy Chan, Ocean Hai
-	一刀了斷	(silver) Myolie Wu, Julian Cheung
-	戀愛令人心痛	(bronze) Linda Chung, Philip Wei
Best Songwriter singer award (最受歡迎唱作歌星)	月亮說	(gold) Ivana Wong
-		(silver) Justin Lo
-		(bronze) Pong Nan
Best Mandarin Song award (最受歡迎華語歌曲獎)	寂寞先生	(gold): Gary Cao
-	這就是愛嗎?	(silver) Joey Yung
-	明天以後	(bronze) Raymond Lam, Vincy Chan
Best Revision Song Award (最受歡迎改編歌曲獎)	給自己的信	(gold) Sherman Chung
-	開動快樂	(silver) Joey Yung
-	今天終於知道錯	(bronze) William Chan
The best compositions (最佳作曲)	就算世界無童話	Mark Lui
The best lyrics (最佳填詞)	如果時間來到	Sandy Chang
The best music arrangement (最佳編曲)	如果時間來到	Johnny Yim
The best song producer (最佳歌曲監製)	Where did you go?	Mark Lui
Four Station Best Song award (四台聯頒音樂大獎)	地球很危險	Leo Ku
Asian Pacific most popular Hong Kong male artist (亞太區最受歡迎香港男歌星獎)	Let's Get Wet	Raymond Lam
Asian Pacific most popular Hong Kong female artist (亞太區最受歡迎香港女歌星獎)	可歌可泣	Joey Yung
The most popular male artist (最受歡迎男歌星)	地球很危險	Leo Ku
The most popular female artist (最受歡迎女歌星)	原來過得很快樂	Miriam Yeung
Gold song gold award (金曲金獎)	搜神記	Joey Yung
