= Who Will Love Me =

Who Will Love Me (誰來愛我)

Studio album by Joey Yung
- Released: 1 September 2000
- Genre: Canto-pop
- Length: 42:05
- Language: Cantonese
- Label: EEG

Joey Yung chronology
EP 2 Don't Miss (2000)	Who Will Love Me (誰來愛我) (2000)	Love Joey (2001)

Who Will Love Me is Joey Yung's first Cantonese full-length studio album, released on 1 September 2000.

== Track listing ==
1. "相當刺激" So Stimulating
2. "Now And Forever"
3. "Goodbye"
4. "穿花蝴蝶" Butterfly Between Flowers
5. "敬請留步" Please Stay
6. "誰來愛我" Who Will Love Me?
7. "好女孩" Good Girl
8. "為你萬歲" Cheer For You
9. "愛不愛" Love Me, Love Me Not
10. "撈針" Searching for a Needle in the Sea
11. "最好時光" The Best Time
