= Very Busy =

Very Busy 很忙

Studio album by Joey Yung
- Released: 14 August 2009
- Genre: Mandopop
- Length: 42:12
- Label: EEG, Ocean Butterflies

Joey Yung chronology
A Time for Us (2009)	Very Busy 很忙 (2009)	Joey Ten (2010)

Very Busy (Chinese: 很忙; pinyin: hěn máng) is Joey Yung's sixth Mandarin album. The album includes a CD with ten tracks as well as a DVD with footage from her MOOV Live Session and four bonus music videos. The CD has 11 tracks in the second release of the album.

For the album Joey collaborated with a number of famous Mandopop musicians that she has never worked with before. The lead single "這就是愛嗎?" was written by popular Singapore singer-songwriter JJ Lin, while the song "永遠的愛人" was written by the famous Mainland Chinese singer Han Hong. Eight out of the ten songs were performed (and heard for the first time) live in July before the album was released at Joey's first MOOV Live Session (a series of concerts organised by Hong Kong's largest online music store).

== Track listing ==
CD

1. Slow Dance (曙鳳蝶) 3:42
2. Answer (答案) 4:33
3. Time Difference of Rome (羅馬時差) 4:21
4. The Playoff (延長賽) 3:56
5. Is this the Love? (這就是愛嗎?) 3:59
6. Very Busy (很忙) 4:15
7. Squid (烏賊) 3:51
8. Dream aren't Dreams (Mandarin version) (夢非夢) 4:19
9. Love on the Red Land" (Mandarin version of "In Search of the Deities") (赤地之戀) 4:32
10. Forever Lover (永遠的愛人) 4:38
11. Children of China (2nd edition only) (祖國兒女) 3:43

DVD
Moov Live 2009

1. Slow Dance (曙鳳蝶)
2. Answer (答案)
3. Time Difference of Rome (羅馬時差)
4. The Playoff (延長賽)
5. Is this the Love? (這就是愛嗎?)
6. Very Busy (很忙)
7. Squid (烏賊)
8. Love on the Red Land (赤地之戀)
9. Couple Things that I Know (我所知的兩三事)
10. Can Sing Can Cry (可歌可泣)
11. Covering Lies (圓謊)

Bonus MV

1. Is this the Love? (這就是愛嗎?)
2. Very Busy (很忙)
3. Is this the Love? (這就是愛嗎?)
4. Answer (答案)

== Awards ==
- Very Busy was awarded one of the Top 10 Selling Mandarin Albums of the Year at the 2009 IFPI Hong Kong Album Sales Awards, presented by the Hong Kong branch of IFPI.
- The song "這就是愛嗎?" won the "Best Mandarin Song silver award" at the 2009 Jade Solid Gold Best Ten Music Awards Presentation.

== See also ==
- Joey Yung discography
