= 2010 TVB corruption scandal =

The TVB corruption scandal was a corruption probe involving the general manager of the Television Broadcasts Limited (TVB) Stephen Chan and two other TVB staff who were arrested by the Independent Commission Against Corruption (ICAC) in Operation: Valiant. Aside from Chan, involved was TVB head of business development Wilson Chan Wing-suen, TVB variety department executive Wilson Chin Kwok-wai, actor Ning Jin and Edthancy Tseng Pei-kun, head of an advertising company. TVB confirmed that three of their employees were involved, and that their duties and work had been suspended pending further development.

== Background ==
Chan was said to control a shell company through his personal assistant to which he was alleged to have awarded production contracts from TVB. The shell company had no production facilities of its own but outsourced the work to other production houses at a much lower rate than it receives from TVB, pocketing the difference the shell company having accumulated as much as HK$10 million over the years. This outsourcing is itself thought to be unnecessary since TVB has the resources in house to handle these productions. One of the arrested is the manager of artist's contracts at TVB and using this position many actors and actresses had been asked to perform in major shows and other functions, and even ribbon cutting ceremonies for free or at very low pay in return for possible future favour. These artists included Bernice Liu, Moses Chan, Raymond Lam, Bosco Wong, Tavia Yeung and Charmaine Sheh.

Prior to the arrest, in late February 2010, speculation existed that TVB deputy chairman Mona Fong had dropped Stephen Chan from her inner circle after he failed to accompany her to a variety show. Chan was also blamed over a copyright issue with the Hong Kong Recording Industry Alliance, and has not been popular with the staff after he laid off hundreds of employees in 2009. Many other artists however have expressed regrets in the situation.

== Arrests and release on bail ==
Chan and the four other were arrested on 11 March 2010 and were released on bail without being charged, the next day. On 18 March 2010, Chan made a public appearance for the first time since his arrest. Chan said that the mask he wore while returning home was because of a shaving wound refuting media reports that it was related to his arrest. Chan also thanks those who sent text messages of support.

I am living well at this moment though there must be some changes to my life. Everyone must experience some ups and downs in their life. If one day you come across any puzzling situation, don't panic ... because the truth must stand while the lies must fall....
I knew the media were waiting outside, so I tried to tidy up myself. But I accidentally cut my cheek while shaving. To avoid the public misunderstanding that the wound was related to the ICAC, I decided to wear a mask....
I was concerned with the personal safety of my media friends and the public. If I held an impromptu briefing, it would create chaos and bring inconvenience to passersby.
So, I decided to [hold this press briefing] in a prearranged setting and orderly manner to satisfy the media friends who then will no longer need to wait outside my home.

Chan was cleared of charges relating to some activities at TVB in November 2010, but three other incidents relating to bribery and conspiracy to defraud are still being investigated. Chan resumed his TVB duties on 16 November, but his duties will not involve artist management and casting arrangement.

== Acquittal ==
Following a trial Chan and his co-accused were acquitted of all charges in the September 2011. The prosecution could not prove beyond a reasonable doubt that Chan knew the details of a payment of HK$300,000 withheld from TVB and five actresses. The court also found that Chan was paid to be an administrator at TVB, and any remuneration he received from the Olympic City shopping mall was as a performer and this did not conflict with his role at TVB.

Following Chan's acquittal a number of artists identified with the Chan faction at TVB have failed to have their contracts renewed.

== See also ==
- 2010 TVB monopoly case
