= 搜神記 =

搜神記 may refer to:

- In Search of the Supernatural, Chinese compilation of legends, short stories, and hearsay
- "In Search of Deities", a track in 2009 album A Time for Us by Hong Kong singer Joey Yung

== See also ==
- The dictionary definition of 搜 at Wiktionary
- The dictionary definition of 神 at Wiktionary
- The dictionary definition of 記 at Wiktionary
