= Solemn on Stage =

隆重登場 (Solemn on Stage)

Studio album by Joey Yung
- Released: 11 October 2001
- Genre: Canto-pop
- Length: 40:07
- Label: EEG

Joey Yung chronology
All Summer Holiday (2001)	隆重登場 (Solemn on Stage) (2001)	Honestly (2001)

Solemn on Stage is Joey Yung's third Cantonese full-length studio album, released on 11 October 2001.

== Background ==
This album was considered different compared to Joey's past albums, as it had a more variety of pop and less R&B, and lead Joey's music to a new direction, more like the music she is releasing now. This album included the theme of Joey's second solo concert and first solo concert series, ~H2O+ Solemn on Stage Live 2001. The concert theme, also the main track for this album, was originally called "Explosive Queen", as the concert was originally called "Explode the Hong Kong Coliseum Live". The concert name was then changed to its actual name after 11 September attack, thus also changing the name of the song. During the time this album was released, Joey voice was already starting to become strained, leading to the infamous voice loss incident that started later on that year.

== Track listing ==
Solemn on Stage
No.	Title	Lyrics	Music	Length
1.	"What's Up"	Chan Fai Young	Chan Fai Young	3:20
2.	"Hard Life" (命苦)	Chan Fai Young; Yan Ung	Chan Fai Young	3:17
3.	"Timid" (怯)	Chan Fai Young	Chan Fai Young	3:21
4.	"Goodbye My First Love" (再見我的初戀)	Chan Fai Young	Chan Fai Young	4:04
5.	"Embrace The World" (擁抱天下)	胡波	谷中仁	3:34
6.	"Solemn on Stage" (隆重登場)	C.Y. Kong	Stanley Leung; 舒文	4:17
7.	"R U Ready 4 Me?"	舒文	舒文	3:47
8.	"Silver Eggs and a Kitten" (銀蛋伴小貓)	Hiro:n	舒文	4:05
9.	"Sleepwalk" (走著睡)	舒文	舒文	3:20
10.	"Trouble You" (麻煩你)	馮穎琪	Chan Fai Young	3:14
11.	"Sand Castle" (沙堡壘)	黃丹儀	舒文; 黃丹儀	3:48
Total length:				40:07
