= Ten Most Wanted =

Ten Most Wanted may refer to:

- Ten Most Wanted (album), a studio album by Joey Yung
- Ten Most Wanted (horse)
- FBI Ten Most Wanted Fugitives, the most wanted list maintained by the United States Federal Bureau of Investigation (FBI)
