= Little Little =

Studio album by Joey Yung
- Released: 21 July 2007
- Genre: Mandopop
- Length: 38:53
- Label: EEG

Joey Yung chronology
Close Up (2006)	Little Little (2007)	Glow (2007)

Little Little is Hong Kong Cantopop singer Joey Yung's fifth Mandarin studio album.

The album was awarded one of the Top 10 Selling Mandarin Albums of the Year at the 2007 IFPI Hong Kong Album Sales Awards, presented by the Hong Kong branch of IFPI. Her song "Little Little" was written by the famous Taiwanese singer, Jay Chou with the lyricist Vincent Fang, both from JVR Music for the first time collaborate, writing her song.

== Track listing ==
1. "曙鳳蝶" Aurora Swallowtail
2. "小小" Little Little
3. "在你的左右" Beside You
4. "怎麼走" How Do I Go
5. "牛奶" Milk
6. "沒關係" Never Mind
7. "花開的時刻" When The Flower Blossoms
8. "天方夜譚" Fables
9. "間接傷害" Indirect Harm
10. "解語花" Riddle Flower
