= Love Joey 2 =

Love Joey 2 喜歡祖兒2新曲加精選

Compilation album by Joey Yung
- Released: 23 October 2002
- Genre: Canto-pop
- Length: 63.30
- Label: EEG

Joey Yung chronology
Something About You (2002)	Love Joey 2 喜歡祖兒2新曲加精選 (2002)	My Pride (2003)

Love Joey 2 (traditional Chinese: 喜歡祖兒2新曲加精選; simplified Chinese: 喜欢祖儿2新曲加精选) is Joey Yung's second compilation/greatest hits album, named after her very successful first compilation album, Like Joey. This album includes 14 past hits and 3 new songs. Her 14 past hits includes not only her famous ballads/"k-songs" like 痛愛, 誰來愛我, and 啜泣, but also includes popular upbeat songs like 隆重登場 and 未知 (Cantonese version of Jennifer Paige's Crush). The new songs consists of the popular chart topping ballad, 爭氣, the themesong to her movie "Demi-Haunted" (with Eason Chan), as well as the upbeat song 電我. This album later on became one of 2002's top ten selling albums.

== History ==
Love Joey 2 has three new songs and 14 previously released songs. The album's cover image features Yung biting into a strawberry. Ming Pao said this creates "a playful and interesting effect" that has been widely praised. Within several days of its release, it became a platinum album.

== Reception ==
The Macao Daily News noted that the album's three new songs were commercially themed since they were used to promote products. The newspaper praised the three songs. Of "Well Deserved Success", it said Yung's "excellent vocal skills deliver the song at a high level". Regarding "Shock Me", the reviewer said the "delivery of fast songs is natural and controlled, and with strong instrumentation and rhythm, this song surpasses the previous one". In its review of "Special Guest", the newspaper called it their favourite of the three, writing that the "lyrics are excellent and the mid-tempo singing brings out Joey's pleasant vocal tone".

Wai Cheng (鄭偉) of the magazine New Monday praised the three new songs, stating that "Well Deserved Success" illustrates Yung's "impressive vocal skills", "Shock Me" has "an upbeat rhythm and a refreshing feel", and "Special Guest" has a "deeply moving performance" through her "masterful emotional control". Oriental Daily News penned a positive review of the three new songs. It stated that "Well Deserved Success" has "fresh ideas and resonates immediately", while "Shock Me" and "Special Guest" have "strong potential to become pop hits".

== Track listing ==
1. 爭氣 Well Deserved Success
2. 電我 Shock Me
3. 特別嘉賓 Special Guest
4. 痛愛 Painful Love
5. 怯 Timid
6. 抱抱 Hug
7. 啜泣 Weeping
8. 未知 Unknown
9. 隆重登場 Solemn on Stage
10. 全身暑假 All Summer Holiday
11. 再見我的初戀 Goodbye My First Love
12. 告解 Confession
13. 阿門 Amen
14. 逃避你 Evade You
15. 何苦 Buy Why?
16. 誰來愛我 Who Will Love Me?
17. 這分鐘更愛你 Love You Even More This Minute
