= EP 1 Joey =

EP1 Joey

EP by Joey Yung
- Released: 29 September 1999
- Genre: Canto-pop
- Length: 22:10
- Label: EEG

Joey Yung chronology
EP1 Joey (1999)	EP 2 Don't Miss (2000)

EP 1 Joey (actually known as EP / JOEY) is Joey Yung's debut EP. It was very well received, selling around 130,000 copies in Hong Kong. The EP also broke the record for the most consecutive weeks on the IFPI album chart, staying on the chart for 2.3 weeks. "未知" is a cover of Jennifer Paige's hit, Crush. "這分鐘更愛你" is a cover of Céline Dion's French song, S'il suffisait d'aimer.

== Track listing ==
1. "未知" Unknown
2. "逃避你" Evade You
3. "這分鐘更愛你" Love You Even More This Minute
4. "今年新款" This Year's Latest Fashion
5. "扮了解" Pretend To Understand
6. "未知" Unknown (Rush Hour Mix)
7. "這分鐘更愛你" Love You Even More This Minute (Merry X'Mix)
8. "燃亮我" Light Me Up – on the Special Edition EP only
9. "逃避你" Evade You (Karaoke version)
10. "這分鐘更愛你" Love You Even More This Minute (Karaoke version)
11. "未知" Unknown (Rush Hour Mix) (Karaoke Version)
12. "燃亮我" Light Me Up (Karaoke version) – on the Special Edition EP only
