= One Mission =

One Mission may refer to:

- One Mission (Capleton album), 1999
- One Mission (Sherman Chung album), 2010
