= Thunder Party =

Studio album by Sherman Chung
- Released: November 26, 2008
- Genre: Cantopop
- Label: Emperor Entertainment Group

Sherman Chung chronology
Castle	Thunder Party	A Letter To Myself (給自己的信)

Thunder Party is a 2008 album by Cantopop singer Sherman Chung. Released by the record label Emperor Entertainment Group, it is her third album. Thunder Party, which has 10 tracks, marked a departure from Chung's initial rock singer image through showcasing a wider range of styles including ballads, rhythm and blues, and jazz tracks. The album received mostly positive reviews from critics, who praised her vocal versatility and vocal technique.

== History ==
Thunder Party, Sherman Chung's third album, has 10 tracks. Her second Cantonese album that year, it was released in November 2008 by the record label Emperor Entertainment Group when she was beginning her second year as a professional singer. The album cover features her in different styles including as a sultry feline persona, an edgy British rocker girl, and a stylish party queen. According to the magazine New Monday, the album is a departure from her reputation as a rock singer. Half of the songs have a slow tempo, while half are fast. "Wild Lily", "Red Brick", "Best Time", and "Eyes Don't Lie" are mid-tempo songs. The rhythm and blues song "One Heart Two Use" explores choosing a boyfriend, while the jazz song "Shut Up" lightly explores the perspective of an independent woman toward contemporary men. In an interview, Chung said she put in extensive vocal practice for "Red Brick", aiming to make her singing more confident.

To publicize her album, Chung put on a school uniform-themed party on 5 December 2008. Fans and musicians including the band Square, Sita Chan, Deep Ng, Hins Cheung, and Steven Cheung attended the party.

== Reception ==
New Monday said the album demonstrated that Chung has "an excellent voice for ballads". Calling the mid-tempo songs "Best Time" and "Eyes Don't Lie" satisfying to sing and enjoyable to listen to, the publication praising her rendition as "surprisingly impressive". Although the reviewer liked every song in the album, the review highlighted areas Chung could improve. The review said that Chung did not sing with complete abandon and should develop greater control when shifting between low and high notes. New Monday thought that her high notes were occasionally overshadowed by the backing vocals, which were mixed too loudly.

East Touch penned a positive review of the album. Noting that Chung is a rare female singer who can handle all types of fast songs, the reviewer felt let down that fast songs made up only 40% of the tracks instead of 70%. The publication called the songs "Eyes Don't Lie", "Red Brick", "Wild Lily", and "Memories of a Break-up" "catchy karaoke songs". East Touch liked how Chung had "precise rhythm", which is rare, in a rendition of the album's R&B songs "Able To Buy" and "Best Time". The reviewer lauded her "crisp enunciation" of the fast songs "80 Commandments", "Tiny Tablets", and "One Heart Two Use", stating they have "powerful rhythms".

Macao Daily News rated the song 80%, stating she made a well-executed reinvention, changing her earlier dancing-image persona through the album's "melodious" song "Wild Lily". Hong Kong Economic Times agreed, stating "Wild Lily" showcased she could perform with "strong emotional intensity". The publication called her high-note performance in "Red Brick" "smooth and stable" and found her to be "at ease" in her groovy song "Able To Buy". The reviewer thought that she displayed "impressive versality" through the song "80 Commandments", which was "stylish and rebellious", and "Tiny Tablets", which had a "sultry allure". The Oriental Daily News said that with its high notes, "Red Brick" is a challenging song, and musicians have lauded her for controlling and delivery the high notes with "exceptional accuracy".

== Track listing ==
The release includes the following tracks.

CD

1. 八十誡 (80 Commandments)
2. 細細粒 (Tiny Tablets)
3. 紅磚 (Red Brick)
4. 野百合 (Wild Lily)
5. Best Time
6. Shut Up
7. 買得到 (Able To Buy)
8. 眼睛不說謊 (Eyes Don't Lie)
9. 一心二用 One Heart Two Use)
10. 分手的記憶 (Memories Of a Break-up)

DVD

The CD+DVD edition includes a DVD with two music videos:

1. 野百合 (Wild Lily)
2. 紅磚 (Red Brick)
