= Metro Vocal Group =

American a cappella group

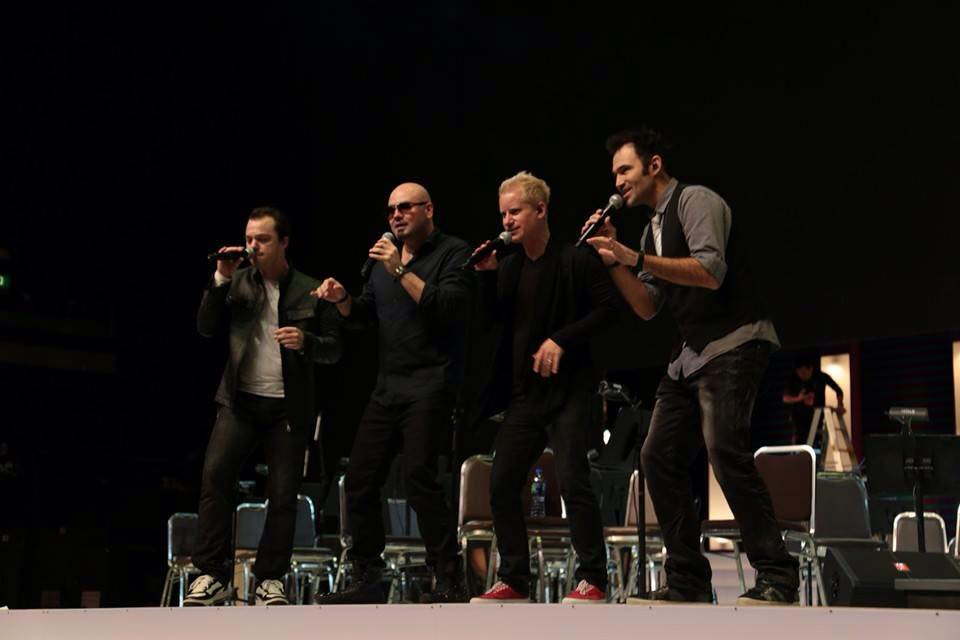
- Metro Vocal Group live in Hong Kong, 2014

Background information
- Origin: Ohio, Nebraska, Kentucky, Iowa, USA
- Genres: A cappella
- Years active: 1998–present

Metro Vocal Group is an American a cappella group based in Hong Kong. Metro's repertoire is a mix of traditional music fused with rock and pop as well as covers of popular songs worldwide. In an a cappella fashion, Metro uses their voices to imitate percussion, trumpets, guitars and miscellaneous sound effects as well full melodies with harmony. Metro is best remembered for their music video covering "Boundless Ocean, Vast Skies" (海闊天空), a song made famous by Hong Kong rock group Beyond, and their cover of Joey Yung's "My Pride" (我的驕傲). The group has since received over 12 million views worldwide on video sharing websites like YouTube and Youku. Since that time, Metro has released two albums, Music for a Metropolis and No Borders, an all Chinese album, and has received acclaim throughout Greater China.

== History ==
=== Celebrity Cruises (1998–2002) ===
The group was originally formed in 1998 by Eric Monson. Eric was asked to form an a cappella quartet by a Nashville-based talent agency to provide entertainment for a six-month contract aboard Celebrity Cruises cruiseships. Eric contacted Sean Oliver, Michael Lance and Chris Riggins to form the original ensemble. The group's first name was Four Score and their initial repertoire was mostly Barbershop and Doo-wop music. Their first contract was aboard Celebrity Cruises Mercury. After finishing the Mercury contract, Metro signed an additional contract aboard Celebrity Cruises Century for its inaugural European cruise. In 2000, the group was asked to be a part of the opening crew for the inaugural voyage of Celebrity Cruises Millennium. It was on board the Millennium where the group would find a distinct sound, adopting more of a pop rock genre, and rename themselves Metro Vocal Group. Shortly thereafter, Metro Vocal Group was hired as part of the opening crew for the Celebrity Cruises Summit's inaugural voyage.

=== Disney (2002–2007) ===
In 2002, after a successful four-year contract with Celebrity Cruises, Metro Vocal Group was hired to perform at Tokyo Disney Resort in Maihama, Japan. While in Tokyo, they performed as the Dockside Porters at the American Waterfront of Tokyo Disney Sea and performed mostly barbershop arrangements. After three years in Tokyo, Metro was asked to open the new Hong Kong Disneyland in 2005. Continuing with a Barbershop sound, Metro entertained as the Dapper Dans on Main Street, USA.

=== Hong Kong (2007–present) ===
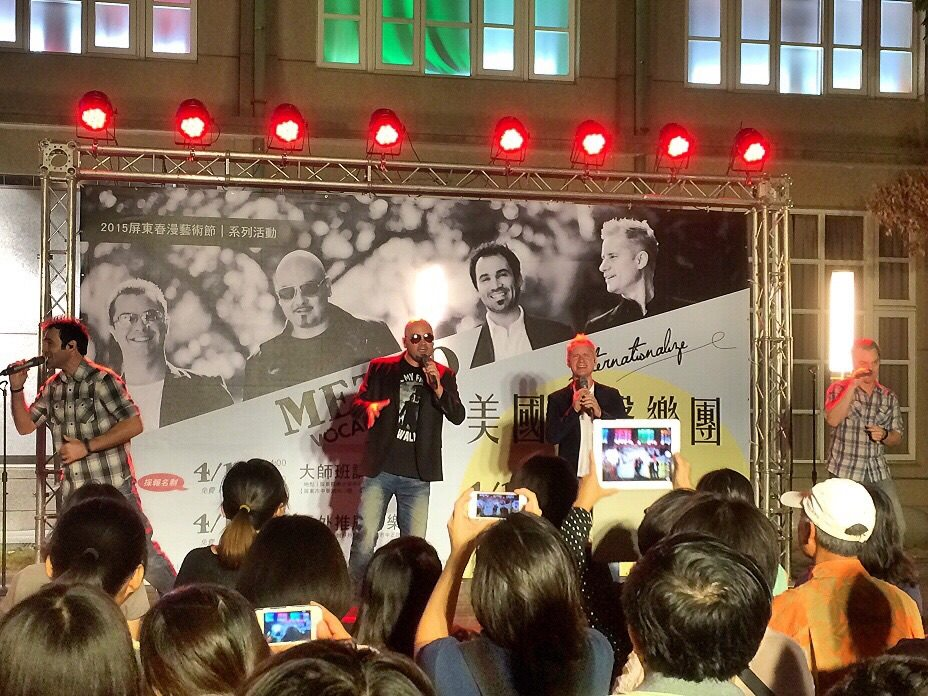
Metro performing in Pingtung, Taiwan, 2015.

In 2007, after two years performing at Hong Kong Disneyland, Metro continued their residency in Hong Kong and now performs throughout Asia. They have appeared on China's Got Talent, Day Day Up, RTHK, CCTV, Beijing TV as well as celebrity appearances on several televised programs in greater China. Metro has also collaborated with many different artists including Ng Yip Kwan, G.E.M. and Hacken Lee and has been featured in several albums such as the gospel collaboration WAO "We Are One" and also with Wendy Zheng on her single "Miracle Love". Metro Vocal Group now holds tours throughout Korea, China and Taiwan.

== Members ==
Current members

- Kevin Thornton - Tenor/Lead/Vocal Percussion (2008–present)
- Sean Oliver - Tenor/Lead (1998-2003, 2004–present)
- Eric Monson - Baritone/Tenor (1998–present)
- Michael Lance - Bass/Vocal Percussion (1998-2003, 2010–present)

Former members

- Marcus Kroese- Tenor (2004-2007)
- Cody Jorgensen - Bass/Vocal Percussion (2004-2010)
- Christopher Coffee - Lead (2003-2004)
- Joel Diffendaffer - Bass (2003-2004)
- Reggie Mobley - Tenor (2002-2004)
- Del Coy - Tenor/Lead (2001-2002)
- Chris Riggins - Tenor/Lead (1998-2000)

== Discography ==
Year	Album	Members
1999	Easy Street	Sean Oliver, Chris Riggins, Eric Monson, Michael Lance
2002	Metro	Del Coy, Sean Oliver, Eric Monson, Michael Lance
2008	Beginnings	Kevin Thornton, Sean Oliver, Eric Monson, Cody Jorgensen
2010	Music for a Metropolis	Kevin Thornton, Sean Oliver, Eric Monson, Cody Jorgensen
2012	No Borders	Kevin Thornton, Sean Oliver, Eric Monson, Michael Lance
2016	500 yds	Kevin Thornton, Sean Oliver, Eric Monson, Michael Lance
