= Castle (Sherman Chung album) =

Studio album by Sherman Chung
- Released: March 25, 2008
- Genre: Cantopop
- Label: Music Plus

Sherman Chung chronology
Good Girl? (2007)	Castle (2008)	Thunder Party (2008)

Castle is Sherman Chung's second album, released by EEG Emperor Entertainment Group in 2008.

== Track listing ==
CD

1. 扭曲 (Niŭqū; Twisted)
2. 我的青春幽靈 (Wŏ de Qīngchūn Yōulíng; My Teen Spirit)
3. 堡壘 (Băolĕi; Castle)
4. 請你合作 (Qĭng Nĭ Hézuò; Please Cooperate)
5. I Don't Care
6. 億萬少女 (Yì Wàn Shào Nǚ; Billionaire Girl)
7. 陽光小小姐 (Yángguāng Xiăoxiăo Jie; Little Miss Sunshine)
8. 紅茶易冷 (Hóng Chá Yìlĕng; Chilling Red Tea)
9. 剛剛好 (Gānggang Hăo; Just Fine)
10. 扶手電梯 (Fúshŏu Diàntī; Escalator)

DVD

The CD+DVD edition includes a DVD with four music videos:

1. 扭曲 (Niŭqū; Twisted)
2. 堡壘 (Băolĕi; Castle)
3. 請你合作 (Qĭng Nĭ Hézuò; Please Cooperate)
4. 陽光小小姐 (Yángguāng Xiăoxiăo Jie; Little Miss Sunshine)
