= Little Day =

Little Day 小日子

Studio album by Joey Yung
- Released: August 15, 2013
- Genre: Canto-pop
- Length: 46:53
- Label: EEG

Joey Yung chronology
Moment (2012)	Little Day 小日子 (2013)	Hopelessly Romantic Collection (2013)

Special Edition Cover

Little Day is the 23rd studio album by Hong Kong singer Joey Yung, released by Emperor Entertainment Group on August 15, 2013.

== Track listing ==
Little Day – Standard Edition
No.	Title	Lyrics	Music	Length
1.	"Little Day" (小日子)	Wyman Wong	馮翰銘	4:15
2.	"Home of Bugs" (蟲之家)	陳詠謙	Fergus Chow	3:28
3.	"Seven Wonders" (七不思議)	梁栢堅	馮翰銘	3:42
4.	"My Cup of Tea" (我杯茶)	林若寧	馮彥中; Kenix Cheang	3:51
5.	"Close to Bed" (臨床)	翁瑋盈	郭薾多	3:43
6.	"No Power is Disaster" (無電才是災難)	陳詠謙	馮翰銘; 何山	3:07
7.	"Skylights" (天窗)	Wyman Wong	Pakho Chau; 馮翰銘	3:44
8.	"View in a New Light" (另眼相看)	Wyman Wong	馮翰銘	3:30
9.	"Close at Hand" (近在咫尺)	Chet Lam	馮翰銘	3:37
10.	"Boudoir" (深閨)	Lin Xi	馮穎琪; Randy Chow	3:13
11.	"The Broken Miffy"" (破了的米菲兔 / Mandarin ver. of "Little Day")	馮翰銘	馮翰銘	4:12
12.	"Charger" (充電器 / Broadway Ad song)	Wyman Wong	Chan Kwong-wing	3:03
13.	"Passing Hokkaido" (途經北海道 / Itacho Sushi Ad song)	陳詠謙	岑寧兒; 王雙駿	3:28
Total length:				46:53

Little Day – Bonus DVD
No.	Title	Lyrics	Music	Length
1.	"View in a New Light (MV)" (另眼相看)	Wyman Wong	馮翰銘	3:59
2.	"Seven Wonders (MV)" (七不思議)	梁栢堅	馮翰銘	3:46
3.	"Charger (MV)" (充電器)	Wyman Wong	Chan Kwong-wing	3:07
4.	"Passing Hokkaido (MV)" (途經北海道)	陳詠謙	岑寧兒; 王雙駿	3:42
Total length:				14:34

Little Day – iTunes Store Special Edition bonus tracks
No.	Title	Lyrics	Music	Length
1.	"Little Day (iTunes Session)" (小日子)	Wyman Wong	馮翰銘	4:20
2.	"Seven Wonders (iTunes Session)" (七不思議)	梁栢堅	馮翰銘	3:51
3.	"My Cup of Tea (iTunes Session)" (我杯茶)	林若寧	馮彥中; Kenix Cheang	3:56
4.	"Close to Bed (iTunes Session)" (臨床)	翁瑋盈	郭薾多	4:02
5.	"Skylights (iTunes Session)" (天窗)	Wyman Wong	Pakho Chau; 馮翰銘	4:01
6.	"View in a New Light (iTunes Session)" (另眼相看)	Wyman Wong	馮翰銘	3:32
7.	"Wallpaper (iTunes Session)" (牆紙)	Wyman Wong	方大同; Edward Chan; 李一丁	4:17
8.	"Gemini (with Adason Lo) (iTunes Session)" (雙子情歌)	Lin Xi	羅力威	4:01
Total length:				32:00

== Credits and personnel ==
- Executive Producers: Ng Yu / Mani Fok
- Marketing & Media Planning: Douglas Chang
- Artiste Promotion: Purple Ho / Wong Chi Wai / Maggie Tse / Cecilia Hung / Nick Choi
- Artiste Management: Mani Fok / Oscar Cheung / Matthew Lo / Sandy Wai
- A & R: Leo Chan / Leong Shek Chi / Liu Chi Wah / Gordan Tsui
- Digital Entertainment Department: Methy Chi / Bonnie Lee / O Leung / Hesta Cheung / Nancy Tang
- Creative Direction: AllRightsReserved Ltd.
- Design: MavisChan@AllRightsReserved Ltd.
- Proofread: John@AllRightsReserved Ltd.
- Photography: Chen Man
- Styling: Sean K
- Hair Stylist: Heibie Mok@Hair Culture
- Make-up Artist: Arris Law
- Mastered By: Tom Coyne@Sterling Sound, NYC
- Sequenced and PMCD by: Ylam@Zoo Music Studio
- Special Thanks: Broadway Electronic, Itacho Sushi, t.qq.com, WeChat

== Release history ==
Region	Date	Format	Label	Edition(s)
Hong Kong	August 15, 2013	CD, digital download	EEG	Standard Edition + DVD
Worldwide	August 15, 2013	digital download	EEG	Standard Edition + DVD
Worldwide	November 19, 2013	digital download	EEG	Special Edition
China	January 15, 2014	CD	Tiankai Music	Standard Edition
