= A Time for Us (Joey Yung album) =

Studio album by Joey Yung
- Released: 30 April 2009
- Genre: Cantopop
- Length: 40:33
- Label: EEG

Joey Yung chronology
In Motion (2008)	A Time for Us (2009)	Very Busy (2009)

A Time for Us is the thirteenth studio album by Hong Kong singer Joey Yung, released on 30 April 2009. The album includes the singles "可歌可泣" (the commercial theme for Broadway Electronics) and "搜神記". The album also contains the commercial themes for mega soft-drink company Coca-Cola (開動快樂) (which is a Chinese version of Open Happiness and fast food giant McDonald's (我所知的兩三事).

== Track listing ==
CD

1. 可歌可泣 Move One To Praises And Tears
2. 我所知的兩三事 I Do Know A Thing Or Two
3. 搜神記 In Search of Deities
4. It Doesn't Matter
5. 心賊難防 Can't Defend From A Heart Stealer
6. 花城 Flower City
7. 開動快樂 Open Happiness
8. 圓謊 Patching Up A Lie
9. 時不與我 Never With Me
10. 兩面 Two-faced

Bonus DVD

1. 可歌可泣 Music Video

== Chart history ==
Song	Approx. Date	TVB	903	RTHK	997
可歌可泣	7 January 2009	1	5	1	1
搜神記	12 March 2009	1	1	1	1
我所知的兩三事	19 May 2009		2	5	
時不與我	2 June 2009				3
開動快樂	16 June 2009	2	20	16	
TOTAL Number 1 Plugs/Singles		2	1	2	2
TOTAL 4 Station Number 1s	1				

== See also ==
- Joey Yung discography
