= Nin9 2 5ive =

Studio album by Joey Yung
- Released: 29 April 2004
- Genre: Canto-pop
- Length: 38:34
- Label: EEG

Joey Yung chronology
Show Up! (2004)	Nin9 2 5ive (2004)	Give Love A Break (2004)

Nin9 2 5ive is Joey Yung's seventh Cantonese full-length studio album, released on 29 April 2004. The theme of the album is about life in the city, which is why the album is called Nin9 2 5ive (9–5, symbolising the average "city person's" working hours). As with Joey's last two albums, this album also includes several preludes and interludes. The character 溶 is just a shorter and more simple version of 凝溶 (溶 means Melt, while 凝溶 means Solidify). The maintrack and first "plug/single" of the album is 一拍兩散, and secondary maintracks includes 世上只有, 夢路, and 借過. Sand Entering the Eyes also incorporated Bossa Rosa style.

== Track listing ==
1. 溶 Melting
2. 夢路 Dreamroad
3. Gimme n A (Interlude)
4. 最後勝利 Final Victory
5. 真身上陣 True Self
6. 吹沙入眼 Sand Entering the Eyes
7. 一拍兩散 Once Going with You
8. 朱古力萬歲 Chocolate Hurray
9. 3:08 pm 銅鑼灣 3:08 pm in Causeway Bay (Interlude)
10. 借過 Excuse me
11. 候鳥樹 Tree of Migratory Birds
12. 世上只有(刀嘜[好媽媽]廣告主題曲) Only You in the World
13. 凝溶 Solidifying
