= Give Love a Break =

Studio album by Joey Yung
- Released: 14 October 2004
- Genre: Canto-pop
- Length: 38.46
- Label: EEG

Joey Yung chronology
Nin9 2 5ive (2004)	Give Love a Break (2004)	Bi-Heart (2005)

Give Love a Break is an album by Cantopop performer Joey Yung.

== Track listing ==
1. Personal Forecast
2. 天氣報告 Weather Forecast
3. 16號愛人 Lover No.16
4. Sandstorm
5. 紅牌出場 Red Penalty Card
6. Pls Leave a Message
7. 煙霞 Haze
8. Rainyday on Black Friday
9. S.O.S
10. My Secret Garden
11. 蜃樓 Mirage
12. Pls Try again later
13. 分身術 Astro Projection
14. Give Love a Break
15. 男朋友與歌 Boyfriends And Songs
16. Coming Back
17. 心病 Heart Disease
18. 身驕肉貴 Cherish My Body
