= Glow (Joey Yung album) =

Studio album by Joey Yung
- Released: 1 November 2007
- Genre: Canto-pop
- Length: N/A
- Label: EEG

Joey Yung chronology
Close Up (2006)	Glow (2007)	In Motion (2008)

== Track listing ==
CD

1. 逃 Escape (Broadway CM Themesong)
2. 很忘 Very Forgetful
3. 零時零分 Zero Hour Zero Minute
4. 密友 Close Friend ("On the First Beat"-TVB Ending Song)
5. 暖光 Warm Light
6. 螢 Glow
7. 床前無月光 No Moonlight Shining on My Bed
8. 解語花 Riddle Flower (Korean Drama "황진이" Hwang Jini Themesong)
9. 陪我長大 Growing Up With Me (MTR CM Themesong)
10. 渴望晨曦的女孩 The Girl Who Wishes To See The Morning Light

Bonus DVD

1. 逃 Escape(Broadway CM Themesong)
2. 零時零分 Dawn (live)
