= Show Up! =

Studio album by Joey Yung
- Released: 30 September 2003
- Genre: Canto-pop
- Length: 46:39
- Label: EEG

Joey Yung chronology
My Pride (2003)	Show Up! (2003)	Nin9 2 5ive (2004)

Show Up! is Joey Yung's sixth Cantonese full-length studio album, released on 30 September 2003. The main track of this album is also the theme for Joey's third solo concert and second concert series, "Neway Joey Yung Live Show Up!", which spanned six nights at the famous Hong Kong Coliseum.

== Track listing ==
1. Panic Room
2. Show Up!
3. 出賣 Betrayal
4. Déjà Vu
5. 流汗 Sweating
6. 歌姬 Diva
7. Cyber Stage
8. 派對機器 Party Machine
9. 心甘命抵 Total Willingness
10. 遲鈍 Sluggish
11. N.G. Takes
12. 勉強幸福 Reluctant Bliss
13. 想得太遠 Thinking Too Much
14. 會很美 Becoming Beautiful
15. 我也不想這樣 I Don't Wanna Be Like That Either
16. Show Up! (Mandarin Version)
