= Close Up (Joey Yung album) =

Studio album by Joey Yung
- Released: 22 December 2006
- Genre: Canto-pop
- Length: 42:12
- Label: EEG

Joey Yung chronology
Jump Up – 9492 (2006)	Close Up (2006)	Little Little (2007)

Close Up is Joey's eleventh Cantonese studio album. The album includes Joey's No. 1 single/plug, “華麗邂逅 (Unexpected Splendid Meeting)”. This is also the first time Joey co-produced some of her songs on an album, under the name JY. It is her most successful album in terms of chart performance, with three 4 station No. 1 plugs, and two songs that placed within CRHK's Top Ten Songs of the Year, 華麗邂逅 in 2006 and 愛一個上一課 in 2007.

As compared to the Hong Kong release, the China release of the album had a song removed due to lyrics that were too sexual in nature.

== Track listing ==
1. 心花怒放 Elated Heart (Broadway Electronics Commercial Theme)
2. 華麗邂逅 Splendid Encounter (Maxim's Mooncake Commercial Theme)
3. 愛一個上一課 Each Lover is a Love Lesson
4. 搖搖搖 Shake Shake Shake
5. Be True
6. 傷神 Exhausting
7. 喜喜 Happy Happy
8. 卸妝 Removing Makeup
9. 如果睡袍太少布 If the Nightgown Is Too Thin
10. 蒸餾 Distillation
11. 黃色大門 The Big Yellow Door

== Chart history ==
Song	Approx. Date	TVB	903	RTHK	997
華麗邂逅	23 September 2006	1	1	1	1
心花怒放	23 December 2006	1	1	1	1
愛一個上一課	17 February 2007	1	1	1	1
