= My Pride =

我的驕傲 (My Pride)

Studio album by Joey Yung
- Released: 25 March 2003
- Genre: Cantopop
- Length: 45:07
- Language: Cantonese
- Label: EEG

Joey Yung chronology
Love Joey 2 (2002)	我的驕傲 (My Pride) (2003)	Show Up! (2003)

My Pride (Chinese: 我的驕傲) is an album recorded by Cantopop singer Joey Yung, released in 2003. "My Pride" was Yung's fifth studio recorded album and garnered Yung with the "Most Popular Female Singer" award for that year. The title song, "My Pride," was a cover of Fiona Fung's English song, "Proud of You" and was named one of the greatest Cantonese songs of all time.

== Title song ==
The title song of the album "My Pride" was originally an English commercial song "Proud of You" by another Cantopop artist, Fiona Fung in 2003. Joey Yung was then requisitioned to record the commercial in Mandarin and later recorded the full song in Cantonese. Shortly after, Yung released a Mandarin version of "My Pride" titled "Girl Fluttering Her Wings" (揮著翅膀的女孩). The song has earned more than 50 awards in the United States, Canada, Hong Kong, China and Taiwan. In 2010, "My Pride" was covered by Hong Kong a cappella group Metro Vocal Group in their album Music for a Metropolis.

== Awards and achievements ==
- 2003年度十大勁歌金曲頒獎典禮 (TVB HK Top Ten Songs Awards)
1. 十大勁歌金曲 (Top Ten Songs – No.1)
2. 金曲金獎 (Song of the Year)
- 2003十大中文金曲頒獎音樂會 (RTHK Top Ten Golden Songs Awards)
1. 十大中文金曲 (Top Ten Chinese Songs – No.1)
2. 全球華人至尊金曲 (Global Chinese Song of the Year)
- 2003年度新城勁爆頒獎禮 (Metro Radio Music Awards)
1. 勁爆歌曲 (one of Top 21 Hits of the Year)
2. 勁爆年度歌曲 (Metro Radio Song of the Year)
- 2003年度叱咤樂壇流行榜頒獎典禮 (CRHK Hit Songs Award)
1. 叱咤十大 (CRHK Top Ten Songs of the Year – No.7)

== Track listing ==
1. Geminian Theme
2. 習慣失戀 The Habit of Being Lovelorn
3. Joey's Clock
4. 神魂顛倒 All Dizzy
5. Some Time
6. 心淡 Fading Love
7. Yummy !
8. Honey !
9. 你的擁戴 Your Allegiant Support
10. 我的驕傲 My Pride
11. 好好聽 Sounds Great!
12. 跩跩 Naughty Naughty
13. Meow's Greeting
14. 與貓共舞 Dancing with a Cat
15. Clubbin'
16. 囉囉攣 Spontaneous Me
17. Lesson One
18. 最後一課 The Last Lesson
19. 他都不愛我 He Doesn't Love Me Either (duet with Deep Ng)
20. 揮著翅膀的女孩 The Girl Who Spreads Her Wings And Flies
