= Love Joey =

Compilation album by Joey Yung
- Released: 18 January 2001
- Genre: Canto-pop
- Length: 59:05
- Label: EEG

Joey Yung chronology
Who Will Love Me (2000)	Love Joey (2001)	All Summer Holiday (2001)

Love Joey is Joey Yung's first compilation, with 11 past hits and 5 new songs. According to the International Federation of the Phonographic Industry (Hong Kong Group)'s official website record sales statistics, the album was among the top ten best-selling Cantonese albums of the year.

== Track listing ==
Love Joey
No.	Title	Lyrics	Music	Length
1.	"Pain Love" (痛愛)	Wyman Wong	Chan Fai Young	3:33
2.	"Mental Love" (精神戀愛)	Lin Xi	江志仁	4:15
3.	"You're Right" (你說得對)	李敏	Camilla Larsson; 舒文	3:07
4.	"Feet Stand on the Ground (with Ronald Leung)" (雙腳著地)	Canny Leung	Ze Vasco	4:06
5.	"Unknown" (未知)	李敏	Andy Goldmark; Bernadette Cosgrove; Kevin Clark; Mark Mueller; 江港生	3:38
6.	"Run away from You" (逃避你)	李敏	伍樂城	4:05
7.	"Love You More in this Minute" (這分鐘更愛你)	馮正	Jean-Jacques Goldman; Roland Romanelli; 江港生	3:49
8.	"Don't Miss" (不容錯失)	李敏	江港生; 舒文	3:20
9.	"Lovin' U"	周禮茂	舒文	4:01
10.	"How Come" (何苦)	Lin Xi	伍樂城	3:12
11.	"So Exciting" (相當刺激)	李敏	Shin Jae Hong; Lee Jae Kyung; 舒文	3:49
12.	"Goodbye"	梁芷珊	Shin Dong Gwan; Robert Seng	4:13
13.	"Who Will Love Me" (誰來愛我)	Lin Xi	伍樂城	3:52
14.	"Search the Needle" (撈針)	梁芷珊	Eric Kwok	2:44
15.	"Beautiful Sight" (美麗在望)	Lin Xi	Thomas Ahlstrand; 王雙駿	3:33
16.	"We're both Lonely" (我們都寂寞)	Lin Xi	伍樂城; Ken Chan	3:48
Total length:				59:05

Bonus AVCD
No.	Title	Lyrics	Music	Length
1.	"Computer Data, Not Playable" (電腦檔案 不能閱讀)
2.	"Beautiful Sight (Music Video)" (美麗在望)	Lin Xi	Thomas Ahlstrand; 王雙駿	3:40
3.	"Dark Sky" (天黑黑)	廖瑩如; April	李偲菘; 吳慶隆	4:08
4.	"Live Medley: The Way You Make Me Feel / 花花宇宙 / 大熱 / 發熱發亮 / 你想愛誰就愛誰 / 娃娃愛天下"			9:06
5.	"Doll Love the World" (娃娃愛天下)	Lin Xi	D.A.I; Ayumi Hanazaki	4:26
Total length:				21:20
