= In Motion (Joey Yung album) =

Studio album by Joey Yung
- Released: 1 September 2008
- Genre: Canto-pop
- Label: EEG

Joey Yung chronology
Glow (2007)	In Motion (2008)	A Time For Us (2009)

In Motion is Joey Yung's thirteenth Cantonese full-length studio album, released on 1 September 2008.

== Track listing ==
1. 跑步機上 On the Treadmill
2. 與蝶同眠 Sleeping with Butterflies
3. 夢非夢 Dream Aren't Dreams
4. 二人浴 Bath Together
5. 忘憂草 Daylily
6. 愛怪物的你 Monster Lover
7. Scream!
8. 蛇 Snake
9. 頹 Laziness
10. 28個我 '28 Me's'

== Chart history ==
Song	Approx. Date	TVB	903	RTHK	997
跑步機上	22 May 2008	1	1	1	1
與蝶同眠	21 August 2008	1	1	1	2
愛怪物的你	15 November 2008		2	1	
TOTAL Number 1 Plugs/Singles		2	2	3	1
TOTAL 4 Station Number 1s	1				
