= A Letter to Myself (Sherman Chung album) =

Studio album by Sherman Chung
- Released: 2009
- Genre: Cantopop

Sherman Chung chronology
Thunder Party (2008)	A Letter to Myself (2009)	One Mission (2010)

A Letter to Myself (traditional Chinese: 給自己的信; simplified Chinese: 给自己的信) is a 2009 album by Cantopop singer Sherman Chung (鍾舒漫).

== History ==
Released in 2009, the album A Letter to Myself is Sherman Chung's fourth solo album. The song "Letter to Myself" is adapted from Angela Aki's song "Tegami (Haikei Jūgo no Kimi e)" and features lyrics by Chow Yiu-fai. Chung said that every time she sings the song, which features gloomy lyrics about unfulfilled childhood goals, she is moved to tears because she considers herself lucky to be a singer. The song was watched 150,000 times and ranked on multiple music charts including as number one on the karakoke chart "K Song chart" (K歌榜) for two back-to-back weeks. Over half of the album's 11 songs were composed by Chung. The album's themes focus on family and religion.

== Reception ==
According to New Monday, the song "Younger Sister" has "a light, upbeat rhythm that's easy and enjoyable to listen to", while the song "Someone Not Invited" has "an unmistakable 1980s dance music vibe". The Hong Kong Economic Times praised the "Letter to Myself", saying Chung had "a commendable performance" and lyricist Chow Yiu-fai penned "poetic" lyrics.

== Track listing ==
CD

1. Higher
2. 給自己的信 (Letter to Myself)
3. 天愛 (Favored by God)
4. 妹妹 (Younger Sister)
5. 三者 (The Third Person)
6. 親手擁抱 (Hug)
7. 從前流淚光 (Cried Enough)
8. 媽媽你累嗎 (You Tired, Mum?)
9. 我有想着你 (I Did Think About You)
10. 不速之客 (Someone Not Invited)
11. 專一有罪 (鍾舒漫/鄭家維) (Faithfulness Is a Crime)

DVD

The CD+DVD edition includes a DVD with two MV:

1. 給自己的信
2. 專一有罪 (鍾舒漫/鄭家維)
