= Joey Yung =

Hong Kong singer and actress (born 1980)

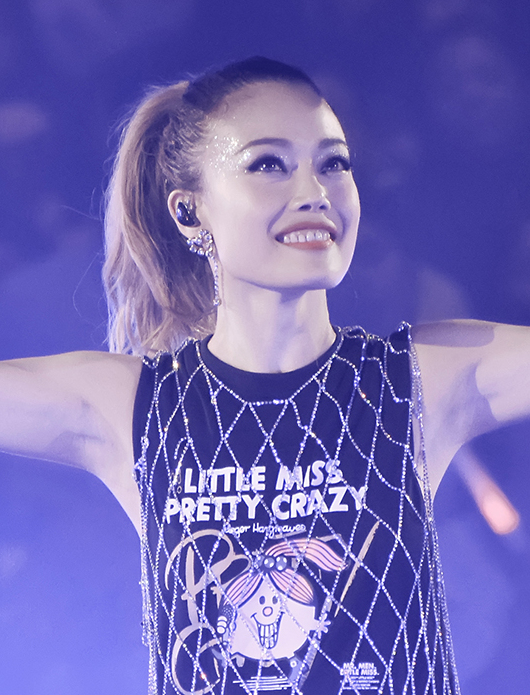
- Yung at Pretty Crazy Concert 2019
- Born: 16 June 1980 (age 46); Tsuen Wan, Hong Kong
- Education: Hong Kong Institute of Vocational Education, Diploma in Tourism
- Occupations: Singer; actress
- Years active: 1996–present

Chinese name
- Traditional Chinese: 容祖兒
- Simplified Chinese: 容祖儿
Transcriptions
Standard Mandarin
- Hanyu Pinyin: Róng Zǔ'ér
- Bopomofo: ㄖㄨㄥˊ ㄗㄨˇ ㄦˊ
- IPA: [ɻʊ̌ŋ.tsù.ɤ̌]
Yue: Cantonese
- Yale Romanization: Yùhng Jóuyìh
- Jyutping: Jung4 Zou2Ji4
- IPA: [jʊ̏ŋ.tsǒu.jȉ]
- Musical career
- Also known as: Joey; Cho B (祖B); Jo-Jo (祖祖)
- Origin: Hong Kong
- Genres: Cantopop; Mandopop; dance-pop; jazz
- Instruments: Vocals, Piano, Guitar
- Labels: EEG; Rock; Avex
- Website: joeyyung.hk

Joey Yung Tso-Yi (Chinese: 容祖兒; Cantonese Yale: Yùhng Jóuyìh, pinyin: Róng Zǔ'ér; born 16 June 1980) is a Hong Kong singer and actress signed to Emperor Entertainment Group. Since her debut in 1996, Yung has received multiple awards at Hong Kong's major annual music ceremonies. She was ranked 63rd on the 2014 Forbes China Celebrity 100.

== Early life ==
Yung was born on 16 June 1980 at Yan Chai Hospital in Tsuen Wan. She has a younger brother. She has ancestral roots in Xinhui, Guangdong. She attended Ma On Shan Lutheran Primary School, where she was classmates with actor Wong Cho-lam in the sixth grade.

At the age of 15, Yung competed in the Big Echo Karaoke Singing Contest and was subsequently signed by Go East Entertainment Co., Ltd. As an artist under Go East, she recorded the song "The First Time I Want to Be Drunk", but the release was commercially unsuccessful, and her contract was not renewed.

== Career ==
=== 1998–1999: Debut ===
In 1998, Yung signed with the Hong Kong record label Fitto Entertainment (later acquired by Emperor Entertainment Group). In 1999, she was sent abroad for training and received singing lessons from Teresa Carpio and Roman Tam, whom she accompanied on concert tours to gain experience as a performer. By then, she had graduated from the Hong Kong Institute of Vocational Education with a diploma in tourism. She also made her first film appearance in The Accident (1999).

On 29 September 1999, she released her debut EP, EP 1 Joey. It sold approximately 130,000 copies in Hong Kong and remained on the IFPI Album Charts for 23 weeks, setting a record for the longest chart-topping stay by a debut artist in Hong Kong.

=== 2000–2009 ===
In February 2000, Yung's apartment in Happy Valley was destroyed in a fire. She had an appearance on Winner Takes All and made her first television drama appearance in The Green Hope. She also released her second EP, titled EP 2 Can't Afford to Miss, and her first studio album, Who Will Love Me. At the same time, she fronted campaigns for several brands, including Four Seas, the Red Cross, and Netvigator, and held her first concert, Joey Yung's 'See You Everywhere' Live Concert, at the Hong Kong Coliseum.

In 2001, Yung released her first compilation album, Love Joey, followed by two Cantonese albums, All Summer Holiday and Solemn on Stage. In November, she held her second live concert and first concert series, H2O+ 'Solemn on Stage' Joey Yung Live in Concert 2001 at the Hong Kong Coliseum. She launched her singing career in Taiwan with the release of her first Mandarin album, Honestly.

In 2002, she traveled abroad for two months to take dance lessons, returning to Hong Kong to release the Cantonese album Something About You. She then became the spokesperson for Nissin and Nikon. On 11 October 2002, she released the Mandarin album One Person's Love Song, and at the end of the year, she released her second compilation album, Love Joey 2.

In 2003, Yung became well known for the song "My Pride" (我的驕傲) (the theme song of the TV commercial for Banyan Garden developed by Cheung Kong Holdings), released on 25 March 2003 on the album of the same name. That year, she became the spokesperson for a slimming parlour; losing some weight and presenting a new image. She released the album Show Up! on 30 September 2003 and held her third concert, Show Up! Live at the Hong Kong Coliseum. On 17 December 2003, she released the Mandarin album Sola Portrait (獨照). At the end of the year, she appeared in several major Hong Kong music award ceremonies, winning several awards, including the JSG Most Popular Female Singer award and the Gold Song-Gold award (金曲金獎) at the JSG Best Ten Music Awards Presentation for "My Pride."

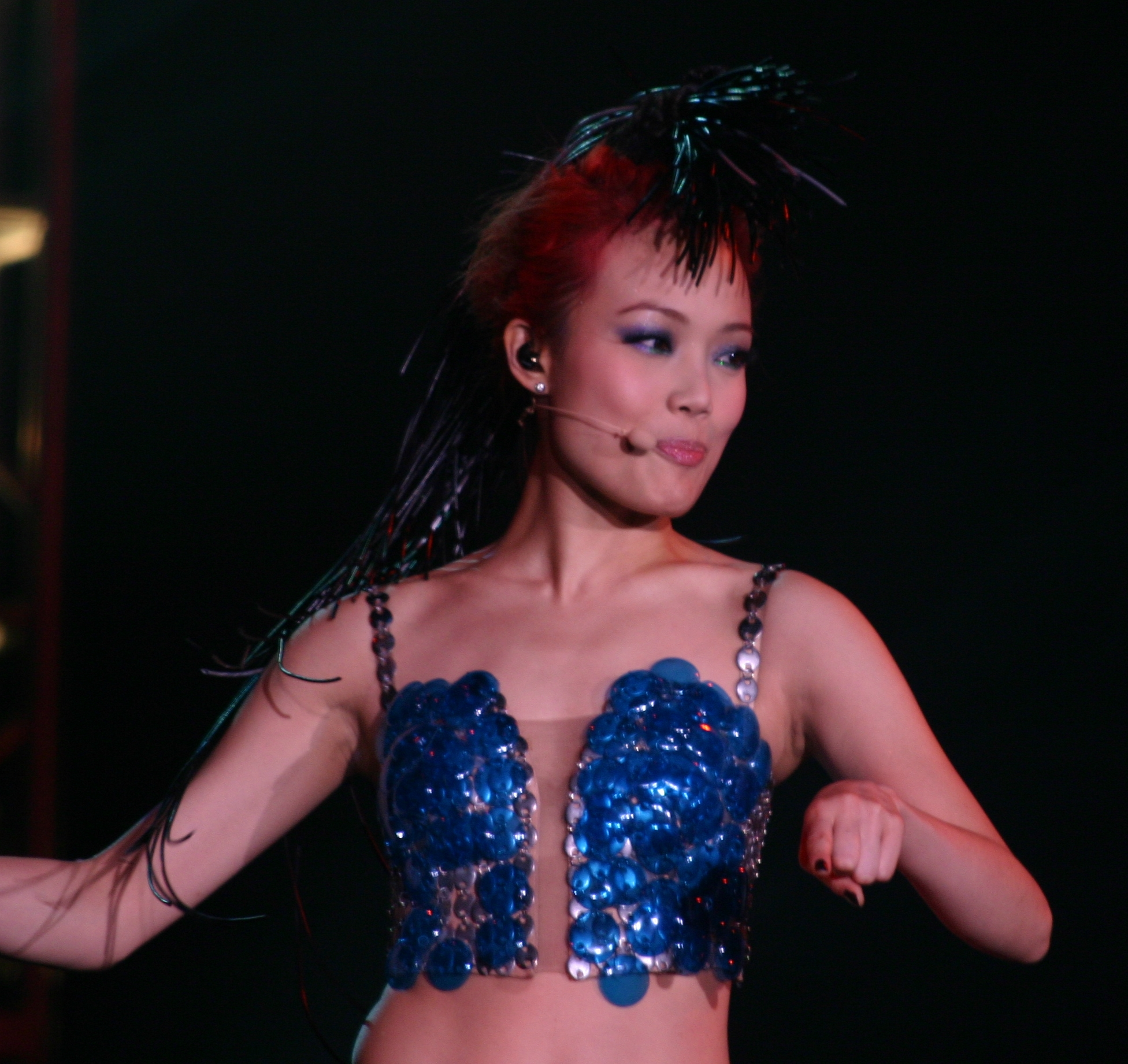
Joey Yung concert in 2006

In 2004, Yung released the studio album Nin9 2 5ive and her first photo album, The Real Joey, Glamour in London. The photo album sold out after its release. Her second album in 2004, Give Love a Break, was also a commercial success; it broke the platinum mark with pre-orders alone. At the end of the year, Yung released a Cantonese cover of "Chihuahua" (a song previously released in English by DJ BoBo) as part of a Coca-Cola advertising campaign in Hong Kong.

In 2005, Yung released her third compilation album, Love Joey 3, as well as a new Cantonese studio album, Bi-Heart. Her fourth major concert, Reflection of Joey's Live Concert, spanned eight days in October and November. The concert's theme song, "好事多為", was mixed and re-arranged in South Korea, resulting in the "好事多為 Reflection Mix". EEG was sponsored by Sony Ericsson for the theme song's music video.

On 27 February 2006, Yung released her tenth Cantonese studio album, Ten Most Wanted. She worked with Mavis Fan for two songs on the album, "Get Fit with Jane Fonda" and "Torn Tongue", both of which had lyrics by Yiu Fai Chow. On 21 July, she released a Mandarin album, Jump Up – 9492.

At the end of 2006, Yung released the Cantonese album Close Up. A second version of the album was released on 26 January 2007, containing a bonus DVD with music videos for the songs "Splendid Encounter (華麗邂逅)" and "Elated Heart (心花怒放)". Around the same time, Yung held a concert organized by Neway with appearances from other artists such as Anthony Wong, at17, Hins Cheung, Yumiko Cheng, Vincent Wong, and Sun Boy'z.

In 2007, she became Hong Kong's ambassador for the World Vision 30 Hour Famine campaign and visited Kenya in March. On 5 July 2007, she released her fifth Mandarin album, Insignificant Me, with the title track produced by Jay Chou. It was one of her worst-selling Mandarin albums. On 7 July 2007, she performed at the Live Earth concert in Shanghai. On 7 November 2007, she released another album, Glow.

In early 2008, Yung released her fourth compilation album, Love Joey 4, and held her fifth concert, titled StarLight Live, over ten days at the Hong Kong Coliseum. In February 2008, Yung travelled to New York City with the hope of improving her dancing skills. That year, she sang several official songs for the 2008 Summer Olympics in Beijing and began a world tour shortly afterwards with shows in Malaysia, Canada, the United States, Mainland China, Singapore, and Macau.

The year 2009 marked the tenth anniversary of Yung's career with EEG. To celebrate the occasion, two albums (A Time For Us and Very Busy) and a documentary were released, and a mini-concert (Perfect Ten Live at the Hong Kong Cultural Centre's Grand Theatre, where Yung won her first major singing contest in 1995) was held on 4 October 2009, with tickets for the two shows selling out within seven minutes. The Perfect Ten Live Boxset was released in two versions in December 2009: the standard version included two concert DVDs, the Perfect 10 documentary, and a photo album, while the deluxe version contained two more CDs from Perfect Ten Live and more photos.

=== 2010–2019 ===
On 29 January 2010, the 10th Anniversary EP titled Joey Ten was released together with the Joey Ten Boxset. The EP consisted of 10 different covers (9 for Version 1 and 1 for Version 2) and five songs. The Joey Ten Boxset included a photo album, stickers, a thank you card from Yung, a 'Chofy' bookmark, a comic book, a 'Chofy' USB, a DVD, and the new EP ('Chofy' is a plush that represents Joey, and the name is a combination of her Chinese name and Miffy). Three songs were promoted from the EP, all reaching number one on at least three charts. In March, Yung concluded her StarLight Tour with two final shows in Sydney and Melbourne. On 20 August 2010, she released another EP, EP2010, and in November she began her Number6 concert, which was her sixth major solo concert held at the Hong Kong Coliseum.

In 2011, Yung took a break for the first time since 2002 and travelled around the world. She stated that she would be focusing on the Mandarin-language market after the break, recording a new Mandarin album and carrying out promotions in Taiwan and Mainland China. On 26 April 2011, Yung became the first Chinese female singer to perform at London's Royal Albert Hall and the third Chinese singer overall, after her mentor Roman Tam in 1979 and Eason Chan in 2010. This was her first concert in Europe, and on 23 September 2011, Yung released her 21st studio album, Joey & Joey. From the album, the song "13:00 (13點)" took the number one spot on three of the four major Hong Kong music charts, and the songs "The Tree with a Thousand Flowers (花千樹)" and "Wallpaper (牆紙)" were number ones on all four charts. Joey & Joey became the highest-selling local album of the year. Yung also starred in the film Diva, produced by Chapman To.

During the first half of 2012, she continued to tour with her Number 6 concert in Macau, Reno, Atlantic City, and Toronto. In July, she released her seventh Mandarin album Moment, from which she promoted the songs "Right Time (正好)", "Looking at Flowers Through the Fog (霧裏看花)", and "Increase Power (加大力度)". That year, she sang the theme song "Drama Series (連續劇)" for the TVB show The Hippocratic Crush and received a total of fourteen awards at the four major awards ceremonies.

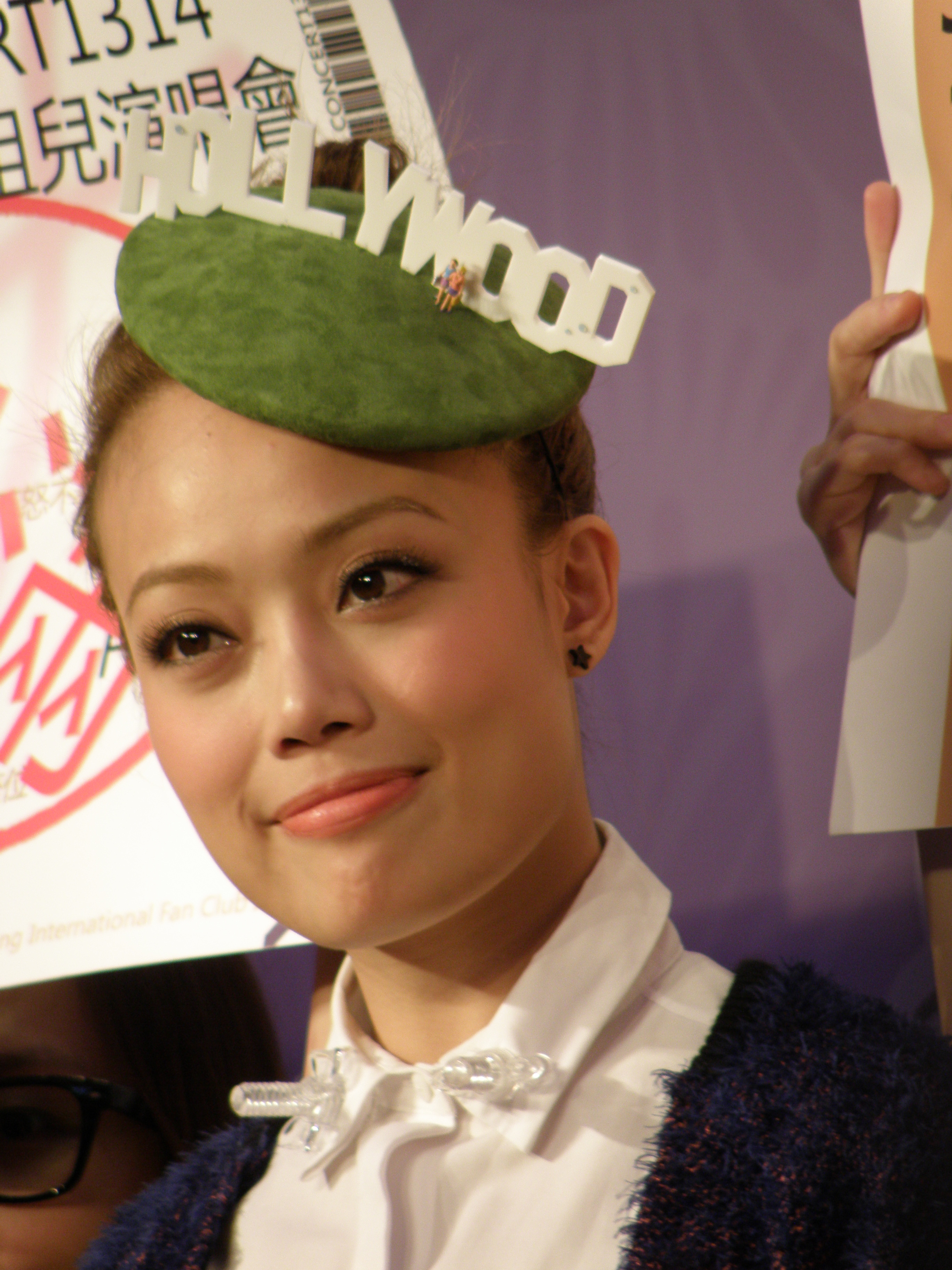
Joey Yung's Little Day CD signing event in 2013

In May 2013, Yung released her first single of the year, "View in a New Light (另眼相看)". On 29 June 2013, she performed the last date of her Number6 world tour in Resorts World Sentosa in Singapore. On 15 August 2013, she released the album Little Day, which went 4× Platinum. She followed the album up with two compilation albums, the Hopelessly Romantic Collection (released 3 December) and the All Delicious Collection (released 20 December 2016).

Between December 2013 and October 2015, Yung performed in the Ageas Joey Yung in Concert 1314 tour, beginning at the Hong Kong Coliseum and holding dates in China, Malaysia, and the United States. In 2014, Yung suffered another period where she lost her voice and had to take care of a family illness. In 2015, Yung performed in concert with Hacken Lee, and she released the EP Me, re-do in April. In 2016, Yung appeared alongside Hacken Lee on the Chinese television series I Am a Singer as the second substitute singer of the season and was eliminated before the second round of the finale.

After six years in planning, Yung performed My Secret Live in the Concert Hall of Hong Kong Academy for Performing Arts. It was a concert where all the songs were non-promotional side tracks from each of her albums. The venue itself was also lesser known and smaller, as the total full attendance in the 17 shows combined was less than half the capacity of the Hong Kong Coliseum. On 31 October 2017, as Yung shifted her focus to commercial sponsorships and various ambassadorial work with Twins, she decided that she would not attend any music awards for the first time in her career in 2017/18 awards season. This was also due to her having no album releases or new works as a singer or an actress in 2017, meaning she would give up defending all her titles during the awards season.

On 24 August, Yung held the nineteenth "Pretty Crazy Joey Yung Concert Tour" at the Hong Kong Coliseum. Yung invited many famous singers to the concert as guests, including Andy Lau, Leon Lai Ming, Jacky Cheung, JJ Lin, Nicholas Tse, Ekin Cheng, Jeff Chang, Louis Koo, Kenny Kwan, The Grasshopper, Julian Cheung, Leo Ku, Hacken Lee, etc.

=== Since 2020: COVID-19 and onward ===
Due to the COVID-19 pandemic, Yung has spent most of her time since mid-2020 in China. Yung released a Cantonese single in November 2020 entitled "Live in the Moment (東京人壽)". This also marked the first time Yung participated in the composition of a song she had co-written with Howie from Dear Jane. A special music video for the song was released in December with clips from the Pretty Crazy Tour. In February 2021, "Gone with the Flare (煙花紀)" was released. The song title was inspired by the lyrics of her 2009 hit song "In Search of Deities (搜神記)" from the album A Time for Us.

Yung embarked on the Pretty Crazy Tour in early 2020 before cutting it short in March due to the COVID-19 pandemic. In January 2021, Yung joined the second season of the Chinese reality series Sisters Who Make Waves (season 2) which sees 30 women, all established artists in their own right, compete in various singing and dancing challenges weekly. Cecilia Cheung was also part of the lineup. Yung ranked second during the initial evaluation stage of Episode 1 and subsequently led her team to victory for the third public performance. The fifth and final public performance took place in April 2021 and Yung emerged 4th overall in the final results, thus successfully debuting in a team.

Yung released a Chinese single, "So Fresh (featuring Dany Lee)," in August 2021. She joined The Masked Dancer (season 2) as a judge and participant. On 29 September 2021, she released a Cantonese single, "After All These (不配)". She also directed the accompanying music video. During a live session, Yung also revealed that she would be releasing her first Cantonese studio album in 5 years by the end of 2021.

On 1 January 2022, Yung joined the "Sailing in the Greater Bay Area, 2022 New Year Concert". On 1 February, she performed the song "Ya Ya Ya" at the "2022 Guangdong TV Spring Festival Gala: Leaping Forward in the Greater Bay Area". The following day, she participated in "Blossoming Spring, 2022 Chinese Literary and Art Circles Spring Festival Gala". On 31 May, the theme song "Forward," celebrating the 25th anniversary of Hong Kong's return to China and featuring Yung as one of the lead performers, was released on a dedicated website for the anniversary celebrations. At 8 p.m. on 3 June, she took part in the CCTV-1 cultural program "Ancient Rhymes, New Voices" for the Dragon Boat Festival, performing the song "Pride of the Fisherman: May Pomegranate Blooms Enchanting". In June, the music video for the CMG theme song "We Will Be Better"—celebrating the 25th anniversary of Hong Kong's return and performed by Yung with others—was released. On 27 June, she performed "The More I Sing, the Stronger I Become" at a cloud concert for the 25th anniversary of Hong Kong's return and participated in the "Our Bauhinia" cloud concert livestream event. On the evening of 30 July, she attended the 36th Hundred Flowers Awards ceremony.

== Personal life ==
In June 2012, Wilfred Lau publicly announced their relationship, which Yung subsequently confirmed. They broke up in 2018. She has openly expressed a pro-establishment stance during the 2019-2020 Hong Kong Protests and was featured prominently in a video campaign by the People's Daily to "oppose violence" and "rebuild Hong Kong." In March 2021, Yung posted on Weibo, expressing her support for cotton made in Xinjiang, after companies suspended purchasing of cotton from there due to human rights concerns.

== Discography ==
Cantonese studio albums

- Who Will Love Me (2000)
- All Summer Holiday (2001)
- Solemn on Stage (2001)
- Something About You (2002)
- My Pride (2003)
- Show Up! (2003)
- Nin9 2 5ive (2004)
- Give Love a Break (2004)
- Bi-Heart (2005)
- Ten Most Wanted (2006)
- Close Up (2006)
- Glow (2007)
- In Motion (2008)
- A Time for Us (2009)
- Joey & Joey (2011)
- Little Day (2013)
- J-Pop (2016)
- Schrodinger's Cat (2021)

Mandarin studio albums

- Honestly (2001)
- A Private Love Song (2002)
- Lonely Portrait (2003)
- Jump Up 9492 (2006)
- Little Little (2007)
- Very Busy (2009)
- Moment (2012)
- Searching For Answers (2018)

== Filmography ==
Film
Year	Title	Role	Notes
1999	The Accident		Guest Star
2000	Winner Takes All	Paulina Wu	
2001	Feel 100% II		
2001	Expect a Miracle		
2001	My Schoolmate, the Barbarian		
2002	Demi-Haunted	Tsi Wan-fei	
2004	The Attractive One		
2005	Crazy N' The City	Liu Tak-nam	
2010	The Jade and the Pearl	Zhu San-niang	
2010	Toy Story 3	Jessie	Cantonese dub
2012	Diva	J Yim	
2015	12 Golden Ducks		
2015	Kick Ball		
2016	Zootopia	Judy Hopps	Cantonese dub
2018	A Beautiful Moment		
2019	I Love You, You're Perfect, Now Change!		
2023	Ride On	Yingzi	

Television
Year	Title	Role	Notes
2000	The Green Hope	Wai Man	
2003	Not Just a Pretty Face	Wu Man-sui	
2004	Sunshine Heartbeat	Fortune teller	Guest Star
2004	Kung Fu Soccer	Wong Siu-mui	
2007	On the First Beat	Cheung Nim-yan	
2009	Stage of Youth		First Chinese series

== Concerts ==
Joey Yung Live in Concert 2001
Date	City	Country	Venue
25 October 2001	Hong Kong	China	Hong Kong Coliseum
26 October 2001	Hong Kong	China	Hong Kong Coliseum
27 October 2001	Hong Kong	China	Hong Kong Coliseum

Neway Joey Yung Live Show Up
Date	City	Country	Venue
16 October 2003	Hong Kong	China	Hong Kong Coliseum
17 October 2003	Hong Kong	China	Hong Kong Coliseum
18 October 2003	Hong Kong	China	Hong Kong Coliseum
19 October 2003	Hong Kong	China	Hong Kong Coliseum
20 October 2003	Hong Kong	China	Hong Kong Coliseum
21 October 2003	Hong Kong	China	Hong Kong Coliseum
20 August 2004	Sydney	Australia	Sydney Entertainment Centre
22 August 2004	Melbourne	Australia	Hisense Arena
9 November 2004	Vancouver	Canada	General Motors Place
14 November 2004	Rama	Canada	Casino Rama
4 March 2005	Genting Highlands	Malaysia	Arena of Stars
5 March 2005	Genting Highlands	Malaysia	Arena of Stars
22 August 2005	Guangzhou	China	Guangzhou Gymnasium
16 July 2005	Shenzhen	China	Bao'an Gymnasium

Sony Ericsson Reflection of Joey's Live
Date	City	Country	Venue
26 October 2005	Hong Kong	China	Hong Kong Coliseum
27 October 2005	Hong Kong	China	Hong Kong Coliseum
28 October 2005	Hong Kong	China	Hong Kong Coliseum
29 October 2005	Hong Kong	China	Hong Kong Coliseum
30 October 2005	Hong Kong	China	Hong Kong Coliseum
31 October 2005	Hong Kong	China	Hong Kong Coliseum
1 November 2005	Hong Kong	China	Hong Kong Coliseum
2 November 2005	Hong Kong	China	Hong Kong Coliseum
14 November 2006	Toronto	Canada	Casino Rama
23 November 2006	Atlantic City	United States	Mark G. Etress Arena
24 November 2006	Atlantic City	United States	Mark G. Etress Arena
25 November 2006	Las Vegas	United States	Mirage Events Center
27 April 2007	Genting Highlands	Malaysia	Arena of Stars
28 April 2007	Genting Highlands	Malaysia	Arena of Stars

Johnnie Walker Keep Walking StarLight Joey Yung Live
Date	City	Country	Venue
25 January 2008	Hong Kong	China	Hong Kong Coliseum
26 January 2008	Hong Kong	China	Hong Kong Coliseum
27 January 2008	Hong Kong	China	Hong Kong Coliseum
28 January 2008	Hong Kong	China	Hong Kong Coliseum
29 January 2008	Hong Kong	China	Hong Kong Coliseum
30 January 2008	Hong Kong	China	Hong Kong Coliseum
31 January 2008	Hong Kong	China	Hong Kong Coliseum
1 February 2008	Hong Kong	China	Hong Kong Coliseum
2 February 2008	Hong Kong	China	Hong Kong Coliseum
3 February 2008	Hong Kong	China	Hong Kong Coliseum
12 April 2008	Hong Kong	China	Hong Kong Coliseum
13 April 2008	Hong Kong	China	Hong Kong Coliseum
14 April 2008	Hong Kong	China	Hong Kong Coliseum
15 April 2008	Hong Kong	China	Hong Kong Coliseum
27 July 2008	Genting Highlands	Malaysia	Arena of Stars
28 July 2008	Genting Highlands	Malaysia	Arena of Stars
27 September 2008	Atlantic City	United States	Mark G. Etress Arena
28 September 2008	Atlantic City	United States	Mark G. Etress Arena
3 October 2008	Toronto	Canada	Air Canada Centre
11 November 2008	Reno	United States	Peppermill Reno
24 December 2008	Shanghai	China	Shanghai Indoor Stadium
9 March 2009	Macau	China	CotaiArena
18 April 2009	Singapore	Singapore	The MAX Pavilion@ Singapore Expo
27 March 2010	Melbourne	Australia	Hisense Arena
28 March 2010	Sydney	Australia	Sydney Entertainment Centre

Joey Yung Perfect 10 Live 2009
Date	City	Country	Venue
4 October 2009	Hong Kong	China	Hong Kong Cultural Centre

Nokia Joey Yung Concert Number 6 2010
Date	City	Country	Venue
19 November 2010	Hong Kong	China	Hong Kong Coliseum
20 November 2010	Hong Kong	China	Hong Kong Coliseum
21 November 2010	Hong Kong	China	Hong Kong Coliseum
22 November 2010	Hong Kong	China	Hong Kong Coliseum
23 November 2010	Hong Kong	China	Hong Kong Coliseum
24 November 2010	Hong Kong	China	Hong Kong Coliseum
25 November 2010	Hong Kong	China	Hong Kong Coliseum
26 November 2010	Hong Kong	China	Hong Kong Coliseum
27 November 2010	Hong Kong	China	Hong Kong Coliseum
28 November 2010	Hong Kong	China	Hong Kong Coliseum
3 December 2010	Hong Kong	China	Hong Kong Coliseum
4 December 2010	Hong Kong	China	Hong Kong Coliseum
26 April 2011	London	United Kingdom	Royal Albert Hall
13 August 2011	Guangzhou	China	Tianhe Stadium
7 January 2012	Macau	China	Cotai Arena
31 March 2012	Reno	United States	Tuscany Events Center
8 April 2012	Atlantic City	United States	Hard Rock Live at Mark G Etess Arena
10 April 2012	Toronto	Canada	Casino Rama
20 October 2012	Genting Highlands	Malaysia	Arena of Stars
29 June 2013	Singapore		Resorts World Sentosa

Ageas Joey Yung in Concert 1314
Date	City	Country	Venue
21 December 2013	Hong Kong	China	Hong Kong Coliseum
22 December 2013	Hong Kong	China	Hong Kong Coliseum
23 December 2013	Hong Kong	China	Hong Kong Coliseum
24 December 2013	Hong Kong	China	Hong Kong Coliseum
25 December 2013	Hong Kong	China	Hong Kong Coliseum
26 December 2013	Hong Kong	China	Hong Kong Coliseum
27 December 2013	Hong Kong	China	Hong Kong Coliseum
28 December 2013	Hong Kong	China	Hong Kong Coliseum
31 December 2013	Hong Kong	China	Hong Kong Coliseum
1 January 2014	Hong Kong	China	Hong Kong Coliseum
2 January 2014	Hong Kong	China	Hong Kong Coliseum
3 January 2014	Hong Kong	China	Hong Kong Coliseum
4 January 2014	Hong Kong	China	Hong Kong Coliseum
5 January 2014	Hong Kong	China	Hong Kong Coliseum
6 January 2014	Hong Kong	China	Hong Kong Coliseum
20 December 2014	Uncasville	United States	Mohegan Sun Arena
27 December 2014	Las Vegas	United States	MGM Grand Garden Arena
23–24 January 2015	Macau	China	Cotai Arena
1 August 2015	Guangzhou	China	Guangzhou Gymnasium
3 October 2015	Genting Highlands	Malaysia	Arena of Stars
17 October 2015	Foshan	China	Foshan Lingnan Mingzhu Gymnasium

Pretty Crazy Joey Yung Concert Tour
Date	City	Venue	Special guest(s)
5 August 2019	Hong Kong	Hong Kong Coliseum	Jacky Cheung
6 August 2019	Hong Kong	Hong Kong Coliseum	Ekin Cheng
7 August 2019	Hong Kong	Hong Kong Coliseum	Miriam Yeung
8 August 2019	Hong Kong	Hong Kong Coliseum	JJ Lin
9 August 2019	Hong Kong	Hong Kong Coliseum	Hacken Lee
10 August 2019	Hong Kong	Hong Kong Coliseum	Pakho Chau
11 August 2019	Hong Kong	Hong Kong Coliseum	Ivana Wong
12 August 2019	Hong Kong	Hong Kong Coliseum	Jeff Chang
13 August 2019	Hong Kong	Hong Kong Coliseum	Twins, Kenny Kwan
14 August 2019	Hong Kong	Hong Kong Coliseum	Dear Jane
15 August 2019	Hong Kong	Hong Kong Coliseum	Louis Koo
16 August 2019	Hong Kong	Hong Kong Coliseum	Andy Lau
17 August 2019	Hong Kong	Hong Kong Coliseum	Nicholas Tse
18 August 2019	Hong Kong	Hong Kong Coliseum	Fama, Julian Cheung
20 August 2019	Hong Kong	Hong Kong Coliseum	Grasshopper
21 August 2019	Hong Kong	Hong Kong Coliseum	Hins Cheung
22 August 2019	Hong Kong	Hong Kong Coliseum	Supper Moment
23 August 2019	Hong Kong	Hong Kong Coliseum	Leo Ku
24 August 2019	Hong Kong	Hong Kong Coliseum	Leon Lai

Joey Yung the Tour: Love In
Date	City	Country	Venue
18 January 2020	Macau	China	Broadway Macau
25 January 2020	Las Vegas	United States	The Palazzo Ballroom at The Venetian
26 January 2020	Las Vegas	United States	The Palazzo Ballroom at The Venetian
2 February 2020	Atlantic City	United States	Hard Rock Live at Etess Arena
3 March 2020	The Hague	Netherlands	AFAS Circustheater
9 March 2020	London	United Kingdom	The London Palladium
5 November 2022	Genting Highlands	Malaysia	Arena of Stars
13 November 2022	Vancouver	Canada	Queen Elizabeth Theatre
20 November 2022	Niagara Falls	Canada	OLG Stage
24 November 2022	Atlantic City	United States	Harrah's Atlantic City
26 November 2022	Las Vegas	United States	Encore Theater at Wynn Las Vegas
27 November 2022	Las Vegas	United States	Encore Theater at Wynn Las Vegas
3 December 2022	Reno	United States	Reno Events Center
10 March 2023	Singapore		Marina Bay Sands Grand Ballroom@ Marina Bay Sands
11 March 2023	Singapore		Marina Bay Sands Grand Ballroom@ Marina Bay Sands

=== Other concerts ===
Date(s)	English name	Chinese name	Shows	Venue
10 June 2000	YES! Don't Miss Live	Yes ! 容祖兒不容錯失音樂會	1	Hong Kong Polytechnic University Jockey Club Auditorium
29 August 2000	Joey Yung Live 2000	~H2O+903 容祖兒 夏水禮音樂會	1	HKCEC Hall 3
19 November 2000	Beauty Prospective Live 2000	~H2O+美麗在望慈善演唱會	1	Hong Kong Coliseum
26 June 2002	Music Is Live 903 id Club Concert	容祖兒903 id Club 拉闊音樂會	1	HKEC Hall 3
4 April 2004	Joey Yung 'Feel the Pop' Concert Live	新城流行女皇音樂會	1	HKCEC Hall 3
18 November 2004	Joey Yung X Hacken Lee The Music Is LIVE 903 Id Club Concert	壓軸拉闊音樂會 李克勤x容祖兒	1	HKCEC Hall 3
21 May 2005	Let Me Believe Love- Joey Yung X Jeff Chang	新城容我信愛 一唱傾情音樂會	1	HKCEC Hall 3
12–15 May 2006	One Live One Love Concert 2006 (with Moravian Philharmonic Orchestra)	容祖兒 姚珏 莫拉維亞交響樂團音樂會	4	Hong Kong Coliseum
28 September 2006	Joey Yung X Leo Ku Juicy Lemon	加洲紅 黃金組合音樂會 容祖兒x古巨基	1	HKCEC Hall 3
26 January 2007	Safari!	Safari!向祖兒狂呼音樂劇	1	HKCEC Hall 3
11 August 2007	Joey Yung x Grasshoppers Live	07年拉闊第二場 容祖兒x草蜢	1	AsiaWorld Arena
6 September 2007	Joey Yung 2007 Best of Teresa Teng Concert Live	甜蜜蜜2007邓丽君金曲交响演唱会	1	北京世纪剧院
12 November 2008	Joey Yung x Anthony Wong Live	容祖兒x黃耀明 祖戀明歌音樂會	1	AsiaWorld Arena
16 November 2009	Music Is Live Joey Yung X Eason Chan	903id club 拉闊音樂會 容祖兒X陳奕迅	1	HKCEC Hall 5BC
7 March 2010	Metro Joey the Queen Music Show	新城容祖兒我的女皇音樂會	1	AsiaWorld Arena
24 April 2010		亞洲巨星NOW翻天成都演唱會	1	成都體育中心
22 August 2010		永明金融呈獻：新城邁向20聲光綻放音樂會	1	HKCEC Hall 5BC
27–29 August 2010		香港旅遊發展局呈獻：香港夏日流行音樂節	1	Hong Kong Coliseum
18 August 2011		永明金融呈獻：新城20聲光綻放音樂會	1	HKCEC Hall 5BC
14 November 2011	Metro Joey & Joey Music Show	Joey & Joey 新城容祖兒音樂會	1	HKCEC Hall 5BC
9–14 February 2012	Concert YY	騰訊微博：Concert YY 黃偉文作品展	6	Hong Kong Coliseum
11 May 2012	Music Is Live Andy Hui X Joey Yung X C AllStar	903id Club 拉闊音樂會 許志安 x C AllStar x 容祖兒	1	HKCEC Hall 5BC
21 July 2012	MOMENT Tour – Guangzhou	QQ音樂MOMENT首唱會	1	廣州白雲國際會議中心
24 August 2012	MOMENT Tour – Taiwan	MOMENT台灣河岸留言音樂會	1	河岸留言西門紅樓展演館
4 September 2012		新城數碼‧巨星靚聲音樂會	1	HKCEC Hall 5BC
19 September 2012	Joey Yung X Ken Hung Live in Dongguan	動感十年我的"容"耀 容祖兒、洪卓立東莞音樂會	1	東莞玉蘭大劇院
4 January 2013		ONE DAY黃韻玲作品群星演唱會	1	上海大舞台
31 March 2013	Miss You Much Leslie	繼續寵愛‧十年‧音樂會	1	Hong Kong Coliseum
11 June 2013		新城唱好女皇‧唱將音樂會	1	HKCEC Hall 5BC
26 September 2013	Joey Yung Moov Live in Guangzhou	容祖兒 摩音符 Moov Live 廣州音樂會	1	廣州星海音樂廳交響樂演奏廳

== Awards ==
Yung has received awards at Hong Kong's four major annual music ceremonies since 1999.

Selected awards:

- 10 JSG Most Popular Female Singer Awards (2003–2007, 2010–2014)
- 9 Ultimate (Chik Chak) Female Singer Gold Awards (2003, 2005, 2007–2013)
- 11 RTHK Best Female Pop Singer (2004–2014)
- 9 Metro Female Singer Awards (2001–2009)
- 7 IFPI Best Selling Female Singer (2004–2006, 2008, 2011, 2013–2014)
- 2 JSG Asia Pacific Most Popular Hong Kong Female Singer Awards (2008, 2009)
- 3 JSG Gold Song Gold for "我的驕傲" (2003) "搜神記" (2009) "天窗" (2013)
- 1 RTHK Global Best Chinese Song Award for "我的驕傲" (2003)
- 1 Metro Song of the Year for "我的驕傲" (2003)
- 2 IFPI Best Selling Cantonese Album of the Year for "Love Joey" (2001), "Joey & Joey" (2011)
- 3 Four Stations Media Award – Singer (2003, 2004, 2009)
- 2 Four Stations Outstanding Performance Award (2000, 2001)

Award records:

- Most Ultimate Female Singer Gold/Silver/Bronze wins (13, 2000–2012)
- Most Ultimate Female Singer Gold wins (8, 2003, 2005, 2007–2012)
- Most Consecutive Ultimate Female Singer Gold wins (6, 2007–2012)
- Most JSG Most Popular Female Singer wins (8, 2003–2007, 2012)
- Most Consecutive JSG Most Popular Female Singer wins (5, 2003–2007), tied with Anita Mui
- Most JSG awards won in one night (7 awards, 2009)
- Most Gold Song Gold wins by a female singer (2, 2003, 2009), tied with Sally Yeh and Miriam Yeung
- Most Metro Female Singer wins (9, 2001–2009)
- Youngest recipient of the Ultimate Female Singer Gold Award (23 years of age)
- Youngest recipient of the Ultimate My Most Favorite Female Singer (23 years of age)
- Most Media Award wins by a female artist (3, 2003, 2004, 2009), she is also the first solo female singer to win the award, as well as the first female singer to win the award without tying (Joey's first win was when she tied with Twins in 2003).

=== 1999 ===
- Metro Hit Music Awards
  - Metro Best Newcomer
  - Metro Top 10 Hits: 未知
- Ultimate Song Chart Awards
  - Ultimate Newcomer Bronze
- Jade Solid Gold Top 10 Awards
  - Most Popular Newcomer Gold
  - Most Popular Cover Song: 未知
- RTHK Top 10 Gold Songs Awards
- Best Newcomer Silver
- Best Cover Song: 未知

=== 2000 ===
- Metro Hit Music Awards
  - Metro Hit Song: 誰來愛我
  - Metro Hit Rising Female Singer
- Ultimate Song Chart Awards
  - Ultimate Female Singer Bronze
- Jade Solid Gold Top 10 Awards
  - Outstanding Performance Gold
  - Most Popular Commercial Song Silver:美麗在望
- RTHK Top 10 Gold Songs Awards
  - Top 10 Chinese Gold Songs: 誰來愛我
  - Most Improved Female Singer Bronze
- Four Stations Joint Music Awards
  - Outstanding Performance Gold

=== 2001 ===
- Metro Hit Music Awards
  - Metro Hit Song: 痛愛
  - Metro Hit Female Singer
- Ultimate Song Chart Awards
  - Ultimate Female Singer Bronze
- Jade Solid Gold Top 10 Awards
  - JSG Top 10 Songs: 痛愛
  - Most Popular Commercial Song Bronze: 全新暑假
- RTHK Top 10 Gold Songs Awards
  - Top 10 Chinese Gold Songs: 痛愛
  - Top 10 Pop Singers
  - Most Improved Female Singer Gold
- Four Stations Joint Music Awards
  - Outstanding Performance Gold
- IFPI
  - Top Ten Best Selling Cantonese Albums: 喜歡祖兒
  - Best Selling Album of the Year: 喜歡祖兒

=== 2002 ===
- Metro Hit Music Awards
  - Metro Hit Song: 抱抱
  - Metro Hit Song: 爭氣
  - Metro Hit Female Singer
- Ultimate Song Chart Awards
  - Ultimate Top 10 – 4th: 爭氣
  - Ultimate Female Singer Silver
- Jade Solid Gold Top 10 Awards
  - JSG Top 10 Songs: 爭氣
  - Most Popular Commercial Song Silver: 爭氣
- RTHK Top 10 Gold Songs Awards
  - Top 10 Pop Singers
  - Top 10 Chinese Gold Songs: 爭氣
  - Best Selling Female Singer
- IFPI Hong Kong Album Sales Awards
  - Top 10 Best Selling Cantonese Albums: 隆重登場
  - Top 10 Best Selling Cantonese Albums: 喜歡祖兒 2

=== 2003 ===
- Metro Hit Music Awards
  - Metro Hit Song: 我的驕傲
  - Metro Hit Song of the Year: 我的驕傲
  - Metro Hit Female Singer: 我的驕傲
- Ultimate Song Chart Awards
  - Ultimate Top 10 – 7th: 我的驕傲
  - Ultimate Female Singer Gold
  - Ultimate My Favourite Female Singer
- Jade Solid Gold Top 10 Awards
  - JSG Top 10 Songs: 我的驕傲
  - Most Popular Female Singer
  - JSG Gold Song Gold: 我的驕傲
- RTHK Top 10 Gold Songs Awards
  - Top 10 Pop Singers
  - Top 10 Chinese Gold Songs: 我的驕傲
  - Global Best Chinese Song: 我的驕傲
  - Best Selling Female Singer
- Four Stations Joint Music Awards
  - Media Award – Singer
- IFPI Hong Kong Album Sales Awards
  - Top 10 Best Selling Cantonese Albums: 我的驕傲
- CASH Gold Sail Music Awards
  - Best Female Vocal Performance: 爭氣

=== 2004 ===
- Metro Hit Music Awards
  - Metro Hit Song: 一拍兩散
  - Metro Hit Song: 世上只有
- Ultimate Song Chart Awards
  - Ultimate Top 10 – 9th: 一拍兩散
  - Ultimate Female Singer Silver
  - Ultimate My Favourite Female Singer
- Jade Solid Gold Top 10 Awards
  - JSG Top 10 Songs: 世上只有
  - Most Popular Commercial Song Gold: 心病
  - Most Popular Mandarin Song Silver: 獨照
  - Most Popular Female Singer
- RTHK Top 10 Gold Songs Awards
  - Top 10 Chinese Gold Songs: 世上只有
  - Top 10 Pop Singers
  - Best Selling Female Singer
  - Best Pop Female Singer
- Four Stations Joint Music Awards
  - Media Award – Singer
- IFPI Hong Kong Album Sales Awards
  - Top 10 Best Selling Cantonese Albums: Nin9 2 5ive
  - Top 10 Best Selling Cantonese Albums: Give Love A Break
  - Top 10 Best Selling Cantonese Albums: Show Up! Live
  - Top 10 Best Selling Mandarin Albums: 獨照
  - Best Selling Local Female Artist

=== 2005 ===
- Metro Hit Music Awards
  - Metro Hit Song: 明日恩典
  - Metro Original Song: 明日恩典
  - Global Stage Performance
  - Global Hit Song: 明日恩典
  - Metro Hit Female Singer
  - Metro Most Admired Female Singer
  - Metro Hit Asia Female Singer
- Ultimate Song Chart Awards
  - Ultimate Female Singer Gold
- Jade Solid Gold Top 10 Awards
  - JSG Top 10 Songs: 明日恩典
  - Most Popular Female Singer
- RTHK Top 10 Gold Songs Awards
  - Top 10 Pop Singers
  - Top 10 Chinese Gold Songs: 明日恩典
  - Best Pop Female Singer
  - Best Selling Female Singer
  - Nation's Popular Female Singer Gold
- IFPI Hong Kong Album Sales Awards
  - Top 10 Best Selling Cantonese Albums: 喜歡祖兒 3
  - Top 10 Best Selling Cantonese Albums: Joey + Hacken Music is Live
  - Top 10 Best Selling Local Artists
  - Best Selling Local Female Artist

=== 2006 ===
- Metro Hit Music Awards
  - Metro Hit Song: 華麗邂逅
  - Metro Hit Song: 赤地雪
  - Metro Hit Commercial Song: 華麗邂逅
  - Metro Global Stage Performance
  - Metro Hit Female Singer
- Ultimate Song Chart Awards
  - Ultimate Top 10 – 3rd: 華麗邂逅
  - Ultimate Female Singer Silver
- Jade Solid Gold Top 10 Awards
  - JSG Top Ten Songs: 華麗邂逅
  - Most Popular Commercial Song Bronze: 華麗邂逅
  - Most Popular Mandarin Song Bronze: 愛情复興
  - Most Popular Female Singer
- RTHK Top 10 Gold Songs Awards
  - Top 10 Pop Singers
  - Top 10 Chinese Gold Songs: 華麗邂逅
  - Best Pop Female Singer
  - Best Selling Female Singer
  - Nation's Most Popular Female Singer
- IFPI Hong Kong Album Sales Awards
  - Top 10 Best Selling Local Artists
  - Top 10 Best Selling Cantonese Albums: One Live One Love
  - Top 10 Best Selling Cantonese Albums: Reflection of Joey's Live
  - Best Selling Local Female Artist

=== 2007 ===
- Metro Hit Music Awards
  - Metro Hit Song: 零時零分
  - Metro Hit Female Singer
  - Nation's Fan Favourite Female Singer
  - Metro Global Hit Singer
- Ultimate Song Chart Awards
  - Ultimate Top 10 – 7th: 愛一個上一課
  - Ultimate Female Singer Gold
- Jade Solid Gold Top 10 Awards
  - JSG Top 10 Songs: 零時零分
  - Most Popular Commercial Song Gold: 心花怒放
  - Most Popular Mandarin Song Gold: 小小
  - Most Popular Female Singer
- RTHK Top 10 Gold Songs Awards
  - Top 10 Pop Artists
  - Top 10 Chinese Gold Songs: 愛一個上一課
  - Best Pop Female Singer
  - Best Selling Female Singer
  - Nation's Best Female Singer
- IFPI Hong Kong Album Sales Awards
  - Top 10 Best Selling Cantonese Albums: Leo + Joey Juicy Lemon Live
  - Top 10 Best Selling Mandarin Albums: 小小

=== 2008 ===
- Metro Hit Music Awards
  - Metro Hit Song: 陪我長大
  - Metro Hit Female Singer
  - Metro Most Airplay Spins – Singer
  - Metro Global Hit Singer
  - Metro Global Stage Performance
- Ultimate Song Chart Awards
  - Ultimate Top 10 – 4th: 跑步機上
  - Ultimate Female Singer Gold
- Jade Solid Gold Top 10 Awards
  - JSG Top 10 Songs: 跑步機上
  - Most Popular Commercial Song: Lucky Star
  - Asia Pacific Most Popular Hong Kong Female Singer
- RTHK Top 10 Gold Songs Awards
  - Top 10 Pop Singers
  - Top 10 Chinese Gold Songs: 陪我長大
  - Nation's Best Female Singer
  - Best Selling Female Singer
  - Best Pop Female Singer
- IFPI Hong Kong Album Sales Awards
  - Top 10 Best Selling Local Artists
  - Top 10 Best Selling Cantonese Albums: 喜歡祖兒 4
  - Top 10 Best Selling Cantonese Albums: StarLight Live
  - Best Selling Local Female Artist

=== 2009 ===
- Metro Hit Music Awards
  - Metro Hit Song: 搜神記
  - Metro Hit Female Singer
  - Metro Most Airplay Spins – Singer
  - Metro Global Hit Singer
  - Metro Hit Mandarin Song: 祖國兒女
  - Metro Honorary Pop Queen Award
- Ultimate Song Chart Awards
  - Ultimate Female Singer Gold
- Jade Solid Gold Top 10 Awards
  - JSG Top Ten Songs: 搜神記
  - JSG Top Ten Songs: 可歌可泣
  - Most Popular Commercial Song: 雙冠軍
  - Most Popular Mandarin Song Silver: 這就是愛嗎
  - Most Popular Cover Song Silver: 開動快樂
  - Asia Pacific Most Popular Hong Kong Female Singer
  - JSG Gold Song Gold: 搜神記
- RTHK Top 10 Gold Songs Awards
  - Top 10 Pop Singers
  - Top 10 Chinese Gold Songs: 搜神記
  - Nation's Best Female Singer
  - Best Selling Female Singer
  - Best Pop Female Singer
- Four Stations Joint Music Awards
  - Media Award – Singer
- IFPI Hong Kong Album Sales Awards
  - Top 10 Best Selling Local Artists
  - Top 10 Best Selling Cantonese Albums: A Time For Us
  - Top 10 Best Selling Mandarin Albums: 很忙
  - Best Selling Local Live Record Production: Joey Yung Perfect Ten Live
  - Best Selling Local Live Record Production: Joey Yung x Anthony Wong Metro Concert

=== 2010 ===
- Metro Hit Music Awards
  - Metro Hit Song: 破相
  - Metro Most Admired Song: 破相
  - Metro Global Hit Stage Performer
  - Metro Global Hit Singer
  - Metro Hit Dancing Song: 桃色冒險
- Ultimate Song Chart Awards
  - Ultimate Female Singer Gold
  - Ultimate Top 10 – 4th: 桃色冒險
- Jade Solid Gold Top 10 Awards
  - JSG Top Ten Songs: 破相
  - Most Popular Commercial Song: 綠野仙蹤
  - Most Popular Mandarin Song Gold: 信今生愛過
  - Most Popular Female Singer
- RTHK Top 10 Gold Songs Awards
  - Top 10 Pop Singers
  - Top 10 Chinese Gold Songs: 破相
  - Best Pop Female Singer
- IFPI Hong Kong Album Sales Awards
  - Top 10 Best Selling Local Artists
  - Top 10 Best Selling Cantonese Albums: Joey Ten EP 2010

== See also ==
- Cantopop
- Roman Tam
