= Sherman Chung =

Hong Kong cantopop singer (born 1984)

Sherman Chung 鍾舒漫
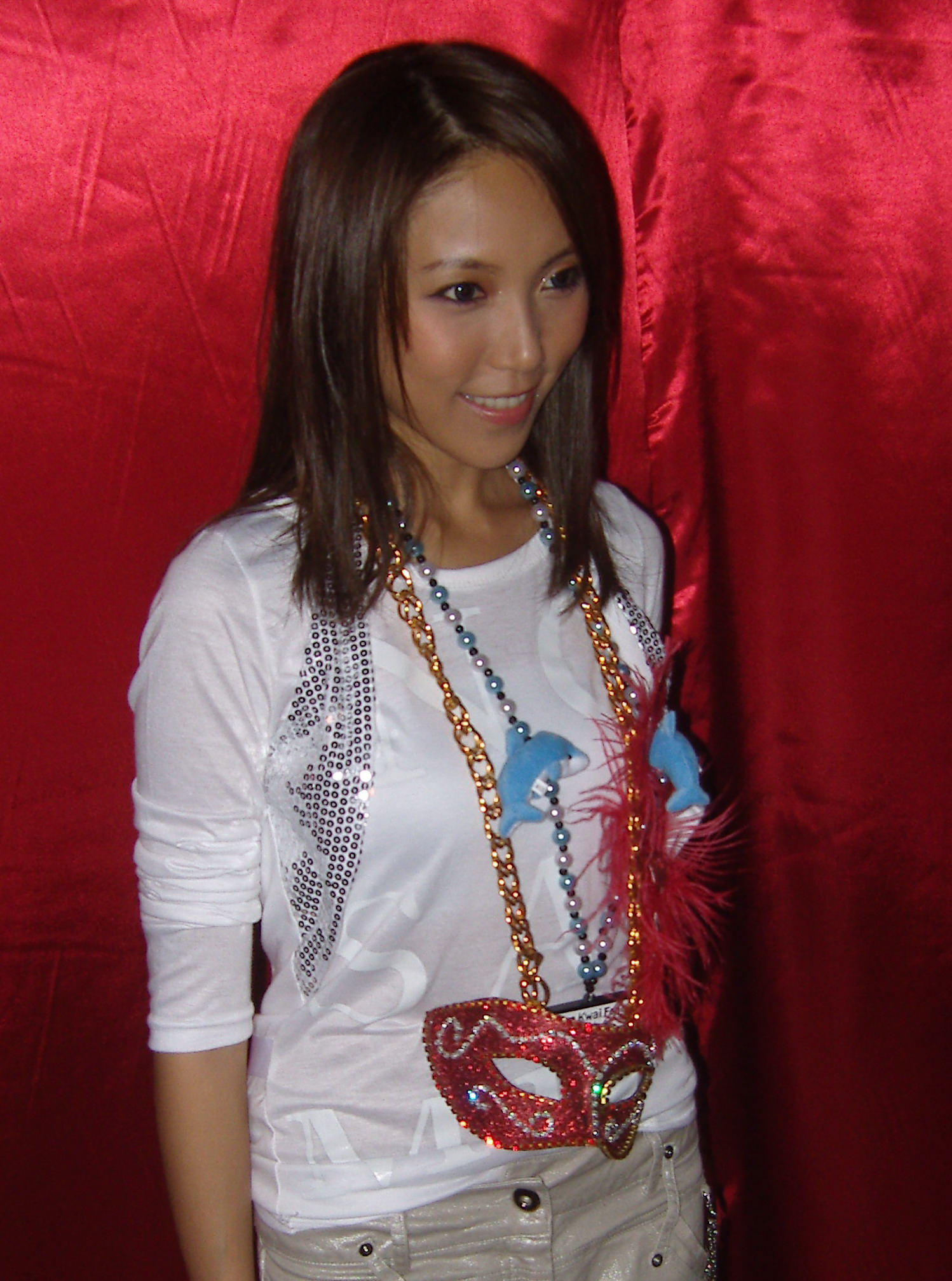
- Chung in 2007
- Born: Chung Shu-man, 鍾舒曼; 20 June 1984 (age 42); British Hong Kong
- Occupations: Singer; actress
- Years active: 2007–present
- Awards: New Talent Singing Awards – 2005 Hong Kong Regional Winner

Chinese name
- Traditional Chinese: 鍾舒漫
- Simplified Chinese: 钟舒漫
Transcriptions
Standard Mandarin
- Hanyu Pinyin: Zhōng Shūmàn
Yue: Cantonese
- Yale Romanization: Jūng Sūmaahn
- Jyutping: Zung1 Su1maan6
- Musical career
- Genres: Cantopop
- Instrument: Piano (grade 8)
- Label: Emperor Entertainment Group

Sherman Chung, (Chinese: 鍾舒漫; born 20 June 1984) is a Hong Kong cantopop singer. She started her career after winning the 2005 EEG Singing Contest (a.k.a. 24th annual New Talent Singing Awards Hong Kong Regional Finals). During 2006, she underwent a series of intensive training and released her first single "The Throes of Master" (高手過招) in 2007.

== Life and career ==
Sherman Chung's childhood dream was to be a painter and pianist.

When Chung was 21 years old in 2005, she participated in TVB International Chinese New Talent Singing Championship of Emperor Entertainment Group Co., Ltd. (EEG), and won the championship by singing Faye Wong's original song "Wonderful for Him" (Golden Mi Award), and joined Emperor Entertainment Group to practice for a year.

In 2007, Chung officially debuted with "The Throes of Master".

On October 2, 2009, the hit work "A Letter to Myself" was released, and with this song, it won 11 consecutive awards at the 2009 four major award ceremonies.

In mid-March 2015, as the singer Deep Ng who was the same company was repeatedly exposed by the media for cheating while the woman was working in other places, she unilaterally announced their breakup.

On July 11, 2020, Sherman Chung officially announced that she would leave from Emperor Entertainment Group and return to freelance in September of the same year. Her sister Sukie Chung supported her decision.

== Discography ==
- Good Girl? (乖女仔) (2007)
- Castle (2008)
- Thunder Party (2008)
- A Letter to Myself (給自己的信) (2009)
- One Mission (2010)
- It's A Beautiful Day (2011)
- I Can (2012)
- SC (2012)
- Everlasting (2013)
- What If... (EP, 2014)
- True Instinct (EP, 2015)
- Sherman, I, Me and Myself (EP, 2016)

== Filmography ==
=== Films ===
- 2008 - Love Is Elsewhere (愛情萬歲)
- 2008 - Beast Stalker (証人)
- 2010 - 72 Tenants of Prosperity
- 2010 - The Stool Pigeon
- 2011 - Summer Love Love
- 2011 - Lan Kwai Fong
- 2011 - Life without Principle
- 2012 - Hold My Love
- 2018 - A Beautiful Moment
- 2018 - Adieu

=== Television shows ===
Year	Title	Role	Network	Notes
2019	King Maker II	Judge	ViuTV	EP31-35
2020	King Maker III	Judge	ViuTV	EP13-20
2021	King Maker IV	Judge	ViuTV	EP16-20

== Awards ==
- 2005 - EEG Singing Contest (Winner) - Golden Mic Award
