= Hong Kong Recording Industry Alliance =

Hong Kong Recording Industry Alliance Limited (HKRIA, Chinese: 香港音像聯盟) is a not-for-profit copyright management organization, formed to handle copyright issues for recording companies regarding the broadcast, public performance and relevant usage of sound recordings (recorded music) and music videos in Hong Kong, Macau and other territories. The founding companies included the traditional internationally recognised Big Four Recording Companies (四大唱片公司) of EMI Group, Sony Music, Universal Music (環球) and Warner Music Group (華納). The group was established in October 2008. Later in December 2010, BMA Entertainment (博美) joined HKRIA, turning the Big Four into the Big Five.

== History ==
As the founding members of HKRIA, the Big Four Recording Companies, Sony Music, Warner Music Group, EMI Music and Universal Music withdrew their membership from IFPI (Hong Kong) on 20 August 2008. They then assigned management of copyright, public performance and other related issues exclusively to HKRIA. On 21 December 2010, BMA Entertainment announced its new membership, joining the traditional Big Four (since reduced to three following the breakup of EMI).

On 2013, EAS Music, Soundgood Production Ltd, BEGGARS, Lemongrass, Starz Track and Equilibrium Music Group were announced its new membership.

On 2015, West One Music Group was announced its new membership.

== Controversies ==
=== TVB ===
On December 24, 2009, HKRIA held a press conference with regards to increasing the royalties due from TVB, the dominant local free over-the-air station, with which many cantopop singers also have artiste contracts. The fees were raised for three reasons.

1. Value of the singers were previously underestimated.
2. TVB is broadcasting more music content than before.
3. To meet TVB's increase use of music, the rise will grant users one year of unlimited licensed use. The royalties due per year is to exceed HK$10 million.

TVB was not satisfied with the fee and began to ban singers from the internationally recognised Big Four from appearing on their programmes. Singers Hacken Lee, Eason Chan and Kay Tse, voiced their support for their respective record labels. In the past, Hacken Lee was often dubbed as "TVB's son" due to his close working relationship with the TV station. However both he and Eason Chan were immediately pulled from their appearances on TVB's Jade Solid Gold and the 21st CASH Songwriter's Quest within days of the controversy. Prudence Liew, signed under the Universal label Cinepoly Records, was quickly dismissed of her hosting duties from the singing competition The Voice, a program she has hosted weekly since July 2009, three episodes shy of the season finale.

As a result of the ban, no artists from HKRIA record labels received any awards at the TVB-organized 2009 Jade Solid Gold Best Ten Music Awards Presentation held on January 16, 2010. Singers affected included many frontrunners of the night: Universal Music's Eason Chan, Hacken Lee, Kay Tse, Hins Cheung and Mr.; Warner Music Group's Fiona Sit and Khalil Fong; and Sony Music's Jason Chan. In support of their record labels, none of the artistes signed to HKRIA record labels showed up to the TVB awards ceremony.

Beginning in 2011 the Metro Radio Hits Music Award Presentation became the only complete award to allow singers from all companies.

== See also ==
- Recording Industry Association of America (RIAA), also included the now-Big Three of Warner, Universal, and Sony.
