= Emperor Group =

Group of company in Hong Kong

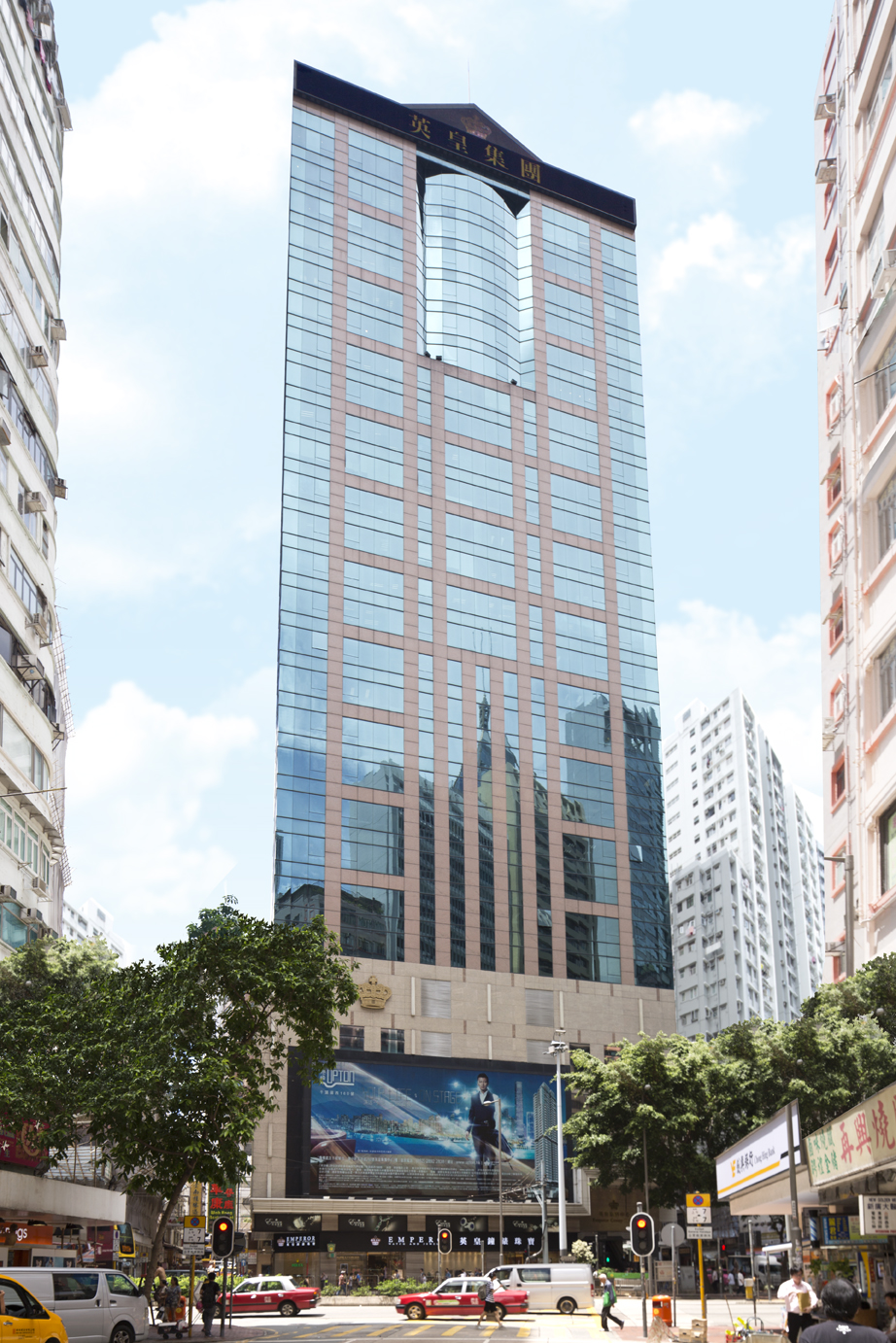
- Emperor Group Centre in Wan Chai District, Hong Kong
- Native name: 英皇集團
- Type: Private
- Industry: Conglomerate
- Founded: 1942; 84 years ago
- Founder: Albert Yeung
- Headquarters: Emperor Group Centre, 288 Hennessy Road, Wan Chai, Hong Kong, China
- Key people: Albert Yeung (Chairman); Alexander Yeung (Vice-Chairman)
- Divisions: Emperor Motion Pictures; New Media Group
- Website: www.emperorgroup.com

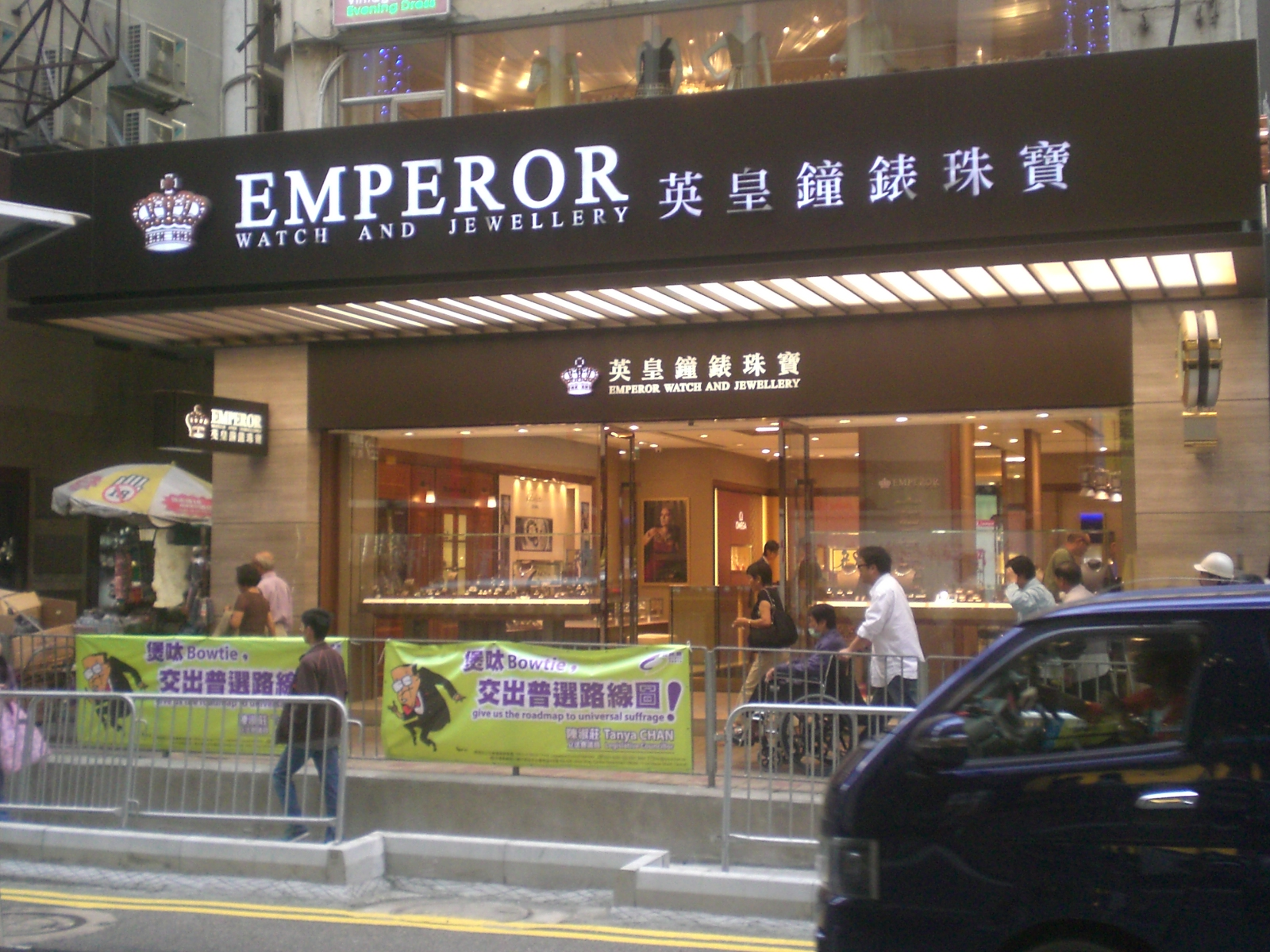
An Emperor Watch and Jewellery shop on Queen's Road Central, Hong Kong

Emperor Group is a Hong Kong conglomerate founded by Albert Yeung. Albert Yeung's father, Mr Yeung Shing, opened a watch shop named "Shing On Kee Watch Shop" in 1942, setting the business foundation.

== History ==
As of 1989, the Emperor Group's investments included a printing service, investment and property holdings, the wholesale and retailing of furniture, infoline and money-lending services, securities and future brokerage services, entertainment, laser disc and video rental, and the supply of equipment for the pager business and Taiwan and mainland China. In 1992, it acquired 30% of the shares of the Hong Kong Daily News (Chinese: 新報; lit. 'new newspaper').

== Listings ==
Six companies within the Group are listed on the Main Board of The Stock Exchange of Hong Kong:

- Emperor International Holdings Limited (SEHK: 163, real estate);
- Emperor Watch and Jewellery Limited (SEHK: 887);
- Emperor Entertainment Hotel Limited (SEHK: 296, hotel and gaming businesses in Macau);
- Emperor Capital Group Limited (SEHK: 717, financial services);
- Emperor Culture Group Limited (SEHK: 491, entertainment, media and cultural development business);
- Ulferts International Limited (SEHK: 1711, chain retailing of upmarket European furniture);
- New Media Lab Limited (SEHK: 1284, digital advertising).

== Subsidiaries ==
=== Financial services ===
Established in 1978, the Emperor Financial Capital Group is now one of the largest financial services institutions in Hong Kong. It has also expanded to Macau and Southeast Asia. The group has two arms:

Emperor Financial Services Group, engaged in the business of forex, bullions and precious metals.

- Emperor International Exchange (Hong Kong) Company Limited is a licensed forex dealer in Hong Kong.
- Emperor Bullion Investments (Asia) Limited offers bullion and precious metals trading services, providing bullion transaction services to individual customers.
- Emperor Gold and Silver Online Limited provides Loco London Gold and Loco London Silver online margin trading services.
- Emperor Consultant Limited Specially established for investor education. It organizes seminars, provides informative resources and offers consultation services.

Emperor Capital Group Limited (SEHK: 717) mainly provides brokerage services in securities and futures. It has been listed on the main board of the Stock Exchange of Hong Kong since April 2007.

=== Watches and jewellery ===
Emperor Watch & Jewellery Limited (SEHK: 887) was founded in 1942 by Yeung Shing. The company is a retailer of timepieces and a manufacturer of jewellery. On 22 March 2011, the firm announced its 2010 annual results, reporting revenue of approximately HK$4,095 million, an increase of 52.5%.

=== Property ===
Real estate investment and property development of Emperor Group are mainly managed by Emperor International Holdings Limited (SEHK: 163). Formally established in 1990, its operations were originally limited to Hong Kong. From 2005, the group began to acquire a number of properties in Macao. Beginning in 2006, the group has engaged in property development projects in Beijing. As of February 2011, the total value of the group's properties was HK$20 billion. In Hong Kong, the group has become the second largest landlord of ground-floor shop spaces on Russell Street in Causeway Bay where retail rents have risen to become the second highest in the world, ranking only below that of Fifth Avenue in New York.

In June 2024, Emperor International Holdings Limited was among ten companies to receive the (Building and Construction Information) BCI Asia Top 10 Developers Award.

=== Entertainment ===
Emperor Entertainment Group (EEG) was established in 1999. Its major businesses include production and distribution of local and foreign records, music publishing, talent management and concert production. The company is also engaged in theater, film and TV production, multimedia and merchandise licensing, retail and other businesses. Emperor Motion Pictures (Chinese: 英皇電影, known as EMP) is a film producer and distributor, part of the Emperor Group. Originally, the company is known as Fitto Movie Co, Ltd. and it is owned by Fitto Entertainment, a company known for distributing karaoke albums and it is also distributes many other VCD and LaserDisc titles under the new label, Fitto Mobile Laser Distribution Co, Ltd. Emperor Group acquired Fitto Movie Co, Ltd. in 2000.

Emperor Cinemas will be renovating the UA Cine Times Cinema at Times Square in Causeway Bay and expect to open for business before end of 2021.

=== Hospitality ===
Opened in 2006, Grand Emperor Hotel is located in Macau and offers dining, accommodations as well as gaming and entertainment facilities. It is managed by Emperor Entertainment Hotel Limited (SEHK: 296), a gaming business of its parent company Emperor International Holdings Limited.

=== Media ===
New Media Group principally engages in magazine publishing and distribution, as well as in providing a marketing platform through advertising spaces to clients. Its flagship titles include Oriental Sunday, Weekend Weekly, New Monday (NM+), Sunday Kiss and Economic Digest. The Group has actively developed its digital business in recent years and transformed into a multimedia platform. The group also owns a printing house named Hong Kong Daily Offset Printing to support the printing of the books and magazines.

=== Furniture ===
Established in 1975, Ulferts is a furniture chain store in Hong Kong dealing in European brand furniture. In 1979, the firm started the production and sales of its proprietary mattress products under the "Ulfenbo" brand name.

=== Food and beverage ===
The Group owns a diversity of restaurants, including Golden Valley, Michelin Star winner of 7 consecutive years since 2011, as well as sassy leisure outlets, dragon-i and TAZMANIA BALLROOM.

=== Esports ===
EES owns three professional eSports teams – G-REX (PUBG), G-REX Infinite (PUBG) and G-REX (LOL). Hong Kong's first professional, world champion League of Legends player Toyz, joined EES as Chief Team Manager.

=== Co-working space ===
Emperor Group's first co-working space, Mustard Seed, is located at Emperor Group Centre, Wan Chai, providing young entrepreneurs with resources, partnership opportunities, community affiliations as well as leasing options at a concessionary rent no higher than half of the market rental. The project has participated in the "Space Sharing Scheme for Youth" to support start-ups and young entrepreneurs. Mustard Seed is no longer in operation.
