= List of awards and nominations received by Pakho Chau =

Pakho Chau awards and nominations
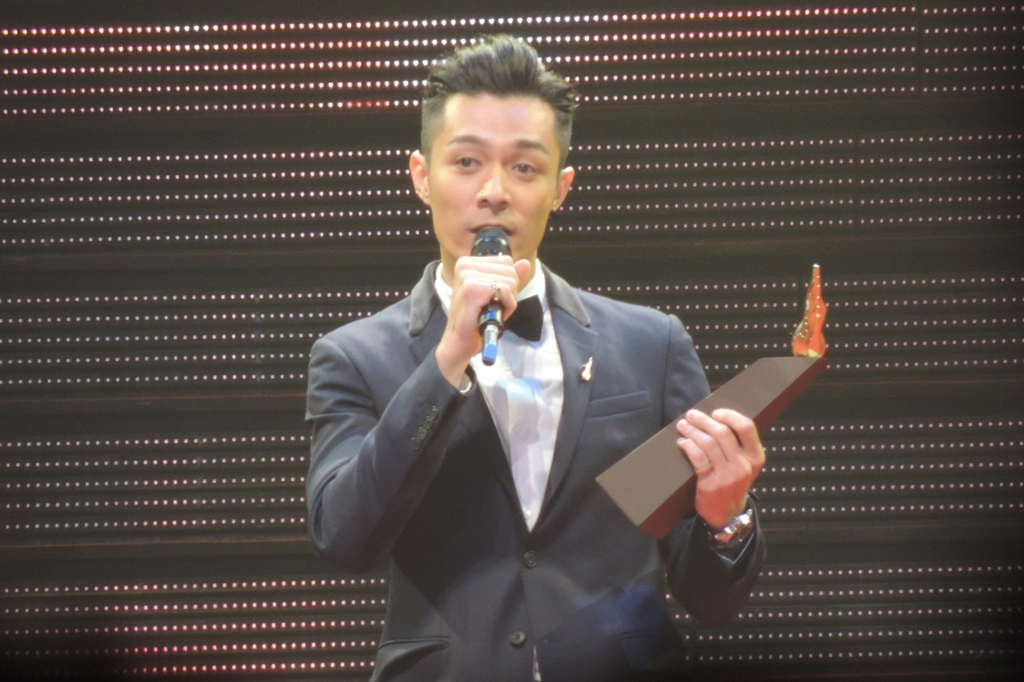
- Chau in 2013
Awards and nominations
Award	Wins	Nominations
Asia Film Award	1	1
StarHub TVB Awards Awards	0	3
TVB Star Awards Malaysia	0	4
MTV European Music Award	0	1
Commercial Radio Hong Kong Ultimate Song Chart Awards	9	9
RTHK Top 10 Gold Songs Awards	12	25
Metro Showbiz Hit Awards	15	15
Metro Radio Mandarin Music Awards	9	9
Jade Solid Gold Best 10 Awards Presentation	3	9
Jade Solid Gold Songs Selections	4	5
Yahoo! Asia Buzz Awards	16	16
QQ Music Awards	1	1
Sina Music Awards	10	10
RoadShow Music Awards	1	1
"King of Music" Global Chinese Music Awards	2	2
Children's Song Awards Presentation	2	2
TVB8 Mandarin Music On Demand Awards Presentation	2	2
Global Chinese Pop Chart	2	2
AEG Music Channel Top 10 Concert Awards Presentation	1	1

Totals (Note: Certain award groups do not simply award one winner. They acknowledge several different recipients, have runners-up, and have third place. Since this is a specific recognition and is different from losing an award, runner-up mentions are considered wins in this award tally. For simplification and to avoid errors, each award in this list has been presumed to have had a prior nomination.)
- Wins: 91
- Nominations: 122

Pakho Chau is a Cantopop singer-songwriter in Hong Kong. In 2007, he debuted with his first EP, Beginning. Here are the awards and nominations received by Pakho Chau.

== Film and television awards ==
=== Asian Film Awards ===
Year	Awards	Work	Result	Ref.
2016	AFA Rising Star of Asia	Himself	Won	

=== StarHub TVB Awards Awards ===
Year	Awards	Work	Result	Ref.
2017	Favorite TVB Male Leading Actor	Lok Siu Fung	Nominated	
2017	Favorite Male Character	Lok Siu Fung	Nominated	
2017	Favorite TVB Soundtrack	天網	Nominated	

=== TVB Star Awards Malaysia ===
Year	Awards	Work	Result	Ref.
2017	Favorite TVB Male Leading Actor	Lok Siu Fung	Nominated	
2017	Favorite TVB Character	Lok Siu Fung	Nominated	
2017	Favorite TVB Screen Couple	Shared with Benjamin Yuen and Priscilla Wong	Nominated	
2017	Favorite TVB Soundtrack	天網	Nominated	

=== TVB Anniversary Awards ===
Year	Awards	Work	Result	Ref.
2019	Best Actor	Wing Ho Tin "Oppa"	Nominated	
2019	Most Popular Male Character	Wing Ho Tin "Oppa"	Won	
2019	Best Theme Song	讓愛高飛 - "Let Love Fly High"	Won	

== Music awards ==
=== MTV European Music Awards ===
Year	Award	Work	Result	Ref.
2017	Best Greater China Act	Himself	Nominated	

=== Commercial Radio Hong Kong Ultimate Song Chart Awards ===
The Ultimate Song Chart Awards Presentation (叱咤樂壇流行榜頒獎典禮) is a cantopop award ceremony hosted by Commercial Radio Hong Kong known as Ultimate 903 (FM 90.3). Unlike other cantopop award ceremonies, this one is judged based on the popularity of the song/artist on the actual radio show.

Year	Award	Work	Result	Ref.
2008	Best New Artist	Himself	Silver Award	
2011	Top 10 Songs	乞丐王子	Won	
2012	Best Male Artist	Himself	Bronze Award	
2014	Top 10 Songs	Imperfect	Won	
2014	Best Singer-songwriter	Himself	Gold Award	
2014	Best Male Artist	Himself	Silver Award	
2015	Best Male Artist	Himself	Gold Award	
2016	Best Male Artist	Himself	Bronze Award	
2016	Best Singer-songwriter	Himself	Bronze Award	

=== RTHK Top 10 Gold Songs Awards ===
The RTHK Top 10 Gold Songs Awards Ceremony(zh:十大中文金曲頒獎音樂會) is held annually in Hong Kong since 1978. The awards are determined by Radio and Television Hong Kong based on the work of all Asian artists (mostly cantopop) for the previous year.

Year	Award	Work	Result	Ref.
2008	Best New Artist	Himself	Silver Award	
2009	Top 10 Songs	一事無成	Won	
2011	Best Improvement	Himself	Bronze Award	
2013	Top 10 Songs	無力挽回	Won	
2014	Best Improvement	Himself	Bronze Award	
2014	Top 10 Singers	Himself	Nominated	
2014	Top 10 Songs	Imperfect	Nominated	
2014	Top 10 Songs	我的宣言 My Vow	Nominated	
2015	Top 10 Songs	傳聞	Won	
2015	Top 10 Songs	自由意志	Nominated	
2015	Top 10 Songs	同行	Nominated	
2015	Top 10 Songs	異能	Nominated	
2015	Top 10 Singers	Himself	Won	
2016	Top 10 Songs	百年不合	Won	
2016	Top 10 Songs	小白	Nominated	
2016	Top 10 Songs	相安無事	Nominated	
2016	Top 10 Songs	等不到	Nominated	
2016	Top 10 Singers	Himself	Won	
2017	Top 10 Singers	Himself	Won	
2017	Top 10 Songs	磨牙	Nominated	
2017	Top 10 Songs	原力 Power Your Life (ft. Jason Chan, Ken Hung, Alfred Hui)	Nominated	
2017	Top 10 Songs	Skynet	Won	
2017	Top 10 Songs	One Day	Nominated	
2017	Top 10 Songs	One Step Closer	Nominated	
2017	Top 10 Singers	Himself	Won	

=== Metro Showbiz Hit Awards ===
The Metro Showbiz Hit Awards (zh:新城勁爆頒獎禮) is held in Hong Kong annually by Metro Showbiz radio station. It focus mostly in cantopop music.

Year	Award	Work	Result	Ref.
2007	New Debut Male Artist	Himself	Won	
2008	Song of the Year	一事無成 (ft.Stephanie Cheng)	Won	
2009	Best Original Song	Lovin' You	Won	
2010	Best Original Song	我不要被你記住	Won	
2010	Popular Singers of the Year	Himself	Won	
2011	Best Singer-songwriter	Himself	Won	
2011	Best Original Song	Smiley Face	Won	
2012	Best Stage Performance	Himself	Won	
2012	Male Artist of the Year	Himself	Won	
2013	Male Artist of the Year	Himself	Won	
2013	Collaboration of the Year	天窗 (ft. Joey Yung)	Won	
2013	Song of the Year	我的宣言	Won	
2014	Song of the Year	傳聞	Won	
2014	Most Played Singer	Himself	Won	
2014	Most Appreciated Digital Music Singer	Himself	Won	

=== Metro Radio Mandarin Music Awards ===
It was first awarded in 2002 and ended in 2015.

Year	Award	Work	Result	Ref.
2012	Best Original Song	錯配	Won	
2012	Best Singer-songwriter	Himself	Won	
2013	Best Singer-songwriter	Himself	Won	
2013	Song of the Year	你還怕大雨嗎	Won	
2014	Song of the Year	小孩	Won	
2014	Male Artist of the Year	Himself	Won	
2015	Male Artist of the Year	Himself	Won	
2015	National Idol Award	Himself	Won	
2015	Song of the Year	犯同樣的錯	Won	

=== Jade Solid Gold Best 10 Awards Presentation ===
Year	Award	Work	Result	Ref.
2008	Best Push	Himself	Nominated	
2008	Best Male Newcomer	Himself	Nominated	
2009	Collaboration of the Year	一事無成 (ft.Stephanie Cheng)	Gold Award	
2009	Outstanding Performance	Himself	Nominated	
2009	Asia Pacific's Most Popular Hong Kong Male Singer	Himself	Nominated	
2009	Popular Male Singer	Himself	Nominated	
2017	Jade Solid Gold Best Songs	Skynet	Won	
2017	Most Popular Singer	Himself	Won	
2017	Most Popular Artist	Himself	Nominated	
2018	Popularity King	Himself	Won	
2018	Best Duet	背后女人 - Miriam Yeung, Himself	Won	
2019	Gold Song of The Year	讓愛高飛 "Let Love Fly High"	Gold Award	
2019	Asia Pacific's Most Popular Male Singer	Himself	Won	
2019	Most Popular Male Singer	Himself	Won	

=== Jade Solid Gold Songs Selections ===
Year	Award	Work	Result	Ref.
2008	First Round	六天	Won	
2008	Second Round	一事無成 (ft.Stephanie Cheng)	Won	
2015	First Round	百年不合	Won	
2015	First Round	小白	Nominated	
2015	Second Round	相安無事	Won	
2017	Second Round	天網	Won	
2018		烏托邦	Won	
2018		男人背後	Won	
2019		讓愛高飛	Won	
2019		最後召集	Won	

=== Yahoo! Asia Buzz Awards ===
Yahoo! Asia Buzz Awards was first held by Yahoo! Hong Kong in 2003. It was a ceremony which present awards to the artists who were popular in the end of the year.

Year	Award	Work	Result	Ref.
2007	Male Newcomer	Himself	Won	
2008	Collaboration of the Year	一事無成 (ft. Stephanie Cheng)	Won	
2009	Hit MV	Lovin' You	Won	
2010	Popular Song	我不要被你記住	Won	
2011	Popular Song	Smiley Face	Won	
2011	Online Streamed Song	Smiley Face	Won	
2012	Hot Song	只有一事不成全你	Won	
2012	Hot MV	斬立決	Won	
2012	Most Picture Searched Singer	Himself	Won	
2013	Hot Male Artist	Himself	Won	
2013	Hot MV	我的宣言	Won	
2013	Hot Song	我的宣言	Won	
2014	Hot Song	傳聞	Won	
2014	Hot Male Artist	Himself	Won	
2015	Hot Male Artist	Himself	Won	
2015	Hot Song	百年不合	Won	

=== QQ Music Awards ===
Year	Award	Work	Result	Ref.
2016	Best Live Act	Himself	Won	

=== Sina Music Awards ===
This award ceremony is the first Hong Kong fan-voted ceremony held by SINA and Hong Kong SINA in 2006, and it ended in 2013.

Year	Award	Work	Result	Ref.
2008	Favorite Male Newcomer	Himself	Gold Award	
2009	Favorite Collaboration of the Year	一事無成 (ft.Stephanie Cheng)	Won	
2010	Top 20 Songs	報告總司令	Won	
2011	Top 20 Songs	乞丐王子	Won	
2011	Best Male Singer	Himself	Won	
2012	Outstanding Male Artist	Himself	Won	
2012	Top 20 Songs	Smiley Face	Won	
2013	Top 20 Songs	無力挽回	Won	
2013	Most Viewed MV	無力挽回	Won	
2013	Outstanding Male Artist	Himself	Won	

=== RoadShow Music Awards ===
This award ceremony is organized by Hong Kong outdoor media provider RoadShow. Since 2006, it has been held in January of each year. It has been suspended since 2009.

Year	Award	Work	Result	Ref.
2008	Best Male Newcomer	Himself	Won	

=== "King of Music" Global Chinese Music Awards ===
Year	Award	Work	Result	Ref.
2008	Best New Artist (HK)	Himself	Won	
2015	Popular Singer (HK)	Himself	Won	

=== Children's Song Awards Presentation ===
This award ceremony was first founded in 1992 by TVB, it was the first ceremony for children's songs. It has been suspended since 2009.

Year	Award	Work	Result	Ref.
2008	Top 10 Children's Songs	哦	Won	
2009	Top 10 Children's Songs	數碼超能量	Won	

=== TVB8 Mandarin Music On Demand Awards Presentation ===
This award ceremony has suspended since 2016.

Year	Award	Work	Result	Ref.
2015	Top 10 Songs	小孩	Won	
2015	Best Singer-songwriter	Himself	Gold Award	

=== Global Chinese Pop Chart ===
Year	Award	Work	Result	Ref.
2014	Top 20 Songs	同行	Won	
2014	Top 5 Popular Male Artist	Himself	Won	

=== AEG Music Channel Top 10 Concert Awards Presentation ===
Year	Award	Work	Result	Ref.
2017	Top 10 Concerts	One Step Closer Live	Won	
