= Ghost Style =

- Born: Brandon Ho; 1973 (age 52–53); Montreal, Quebec, Canada
- Citizenship: Canada; Hong Kong
- Occupations: Rapper; Producer; DJ; Actor; Guitarist; Podcast host
- Years active: 1999-present

Ghost Style is the stage name of Brandon Ho (born 1973 in Montreal, Quebec, Canada), a Canadian rapper, producer and actor based in Hong Kong. He is credited with releasing the first English language rap album in Hong Kong (Ghost Style's Alias, 2002). He followed up with two other English rap albums (Supathugz' How Deep Is Yo Love in 2004 and Ghost Style's Message Is Complete, 2005).

== Career ==
Ghost Style started his career as the frontman for a Hong Kong local band called "Site Access." They are known for bringing out an original sound Alternative Groove Funk. The band decided to take a break in 2003 and that's when Ghost Style started his solo career.

His first major work as rapper/producer was for Cantopop star Eason Chan. In 2001, Ghost Style was invited to remix one of Chan's songs for a remix project Mixed Up. At the same time Ghost Style met international dance music producer Dan F (Disuye). At that time Dan F was creating breakbeat tracks and both collaborated on the remix. Dan F who won two Breakbeat Awards in the UK, would be Ghost Style's collaborator on 2002 release Alias and Ghost Style's 2005 release Message Is Complete. Ghost Style was the voice talent in the 2005 movie soundtrack release Initial D.

Ghost Style had formed a project label called Rebel Studio (now defunct). The producer is giving back by supporting local talents and other urban events in Hong Kong. In Summer 2006, while out on the weekend Ghost Style bumped into Hong Kong actor/celebrity Conroy Chan. Conroy suggested to form a group consisting of six members; Eddie Chung (drum music), Brian Siswojo (designer for street fashion label Know1edge, 8five2 Shop owner), Kit & Phat (from Hong Kong legendary crew LMF), Ghost Style and himself. GS thought this would be a great collaboration and "24HERBS" was formed.

Since 2006, Ghost Style has worked with 24Herbs. Ghost Style is both a rapper and one of the producers in the crew. Their album released on 24 January 2008 at the Causeway Bay Delay No Mall Hong Kong. Ghost Style helped pen hits such as "Superstar", "Jiu Jo" and "Chillin & Blazin". 24Herbs won an award for Hong Kong best new song on January 1, 2009. "Jiu Jo" was also featured on Nike Skateboard website.

== Discography ==
=== Albums ===
- Site Access Slow Jam LP, 2000
- Ghost Style Alias LP, 2002
- Site Access Funk Fu LP, 2003
- Supathugz How Deep Is Yo Love LP, 2003
- Supathugz So Hot It Hertz LP, 2004
- Ghost Style Message Is Complete LP, 2005
- LY.S O1 Mash up live recording The Darlings + Ghost Style LP, 2007
- 24HERBS 24HERBS Double-Disc LP, 2008
- Ghost Style "Quantum Beats and Alien Bloodlines" instrumental, 2010
- 24HERBS Bring it On CD+DVD, 2011
- Ghost Style GeeStyles Collabo EP Digital Download, 2011
- Brandon H. One Digital album, 2022

=== Productions ===
- CR2 Tribute to Beyond Paradise, 1999
- Videodrome Make You Die Slowly, 2001
- MCB Music for Your Beautiful Boy In the Land of The Ice and Snow, 2001
- Alok's Wahoo! Future Moon Slay, 2002
- FAMA F.A.M.A., 2002
- MC Su Trip , 2004
- Alok's 31 Minutes to Midnight Dead Poet's Society, 2005
- 5th Element Compilation What's Going On, 2005
- Jan Lamb's 30something First Romance, 2005
- MC Su Pills & Permit , 2006
- Jan Lamb's 30something World is Strange, 2008
- 24Herbs Chillin' & Blazin', 2008
- 24Herbs "Jiu Jo", 2008
- 24Herbs "Crazy Night", 2008
- 24Herbs "Keepin' It Raw", 2008
- Ghost Style feat. Maggie Hou Love Affair, 2010
- Ghost Style X Green Robot Up Down Girl, 2010
- Ghost Style x Green Robot "Giant F*ckin' Robot" 2011
- Ghost Style x DJ Jay Weezy "The Brighter Side", 2011
- Ghost Style "Beat Bang Baby", 2011
- 24Herbs "Fashionista", 2011
- 24Herbs "Rock As One", 2011
- 24Herbs "Perfect", 2011
- 24Herbs "Hu Ge", 2011
- Edmond Leung "Big Man" ft. 24Herbs, 2012

=== Feature ===
- Alok "Future Moon Slay" ft. Ghost Style, 2002
- Alok "Dead Poet’s Society" ft. Ghost Style, 2005
- Paul Wong "Let's Fight" ft. Ghost Style, 2009
- Sammi Cheng 鄭秀文 "Forgiveness (Eng. Version)" ft. 24Herbs' Ghost Style, Drunk, JBS, 2009
- 85up2 Mixtape ""So Far To Go"" ft. Ghost Style, 2009
- 24Herbs Bring It On ""Chillax"" ft. Ghost Style, Soft Lipa 蛋堡, 2010
- 24Herbs Bring It On ""Why Can't U"" ft. Ghost Style, 2010
- Niki Chow - Zui Hou Dao Shu featuring Ghost Style, 2010
- Khalil Fong "张永成 (Cheung Wing Sing)" ft. Ghost Style, 2011
- Paul Wong "這個荒唐無聊盲目的世界" ft. Ghost Style, Phat, Kit, JBS, 2012
- MastaMic Justice Is What IRap For Mixtape ""仇富不仁(Justice Remix)"" ft. Ghost Style, 肥寶, Critical, 鳥人, BIG Sammy, 2012
- My City - Ghost Style ft. Liz Ho and Joyce Yung, 2012
- 《La La La》Robynn & Kendy ft. Ghost Style, 2013
- Sammi Cheng 鄭秀文 "戰勝自己" ft. 24Herbs' Ghost Style, Phat, Kit, 2014
- Chung Brothers "Mammon" ft. Ghost Style, Kwokkin 2014
- Aga "3am" ft. Ghost Style 2017

=== Remixes ===
- Eason Chan Mixed Up (track 2), 2001
- inLove "Realm (Ghost Style remix)", 2005
- Oliver "Scent of U", 2007
- KZ ""90年代曲"" (mixing engineer), 2010
- Tommy Grooves "Room Service" (mixing engineer), 2012

=== Soundtrack ===
- Initial D The Movie Soundtrack, 2005
- Girl$ 囡囡(unreleased soundtrack), 2010
