= Lan Kwai Fong 2 =

2012 Hong Kong film by Wilson Chin

- Traditional Chinese: 喜愛夜蒲
- Simplified Chinese: 喜爱夜蒲
- Hanyu Pinyin: Xǐài Yèpú
- Jyutping: hei2 ngoi3 je6 pou4
- Directed by: Wilson Chin
- Screenplay by: Mark Wu; Lam Fung
- Produced by: Li Kuo-hsing
- Starring: Shiga Lin; Kelvin Kwan; Sammy Sum; Avis Chan; Boey Chan; Izumt Liu
- Cinematography: Chan Chor Keung
- Edited by: Hui Wai Kit
- Music by: Ronald Ng
- Production company: Mei Ah Entertainment
- Release date: 23 August 2012
- Running time: 100 minutes
- Country: Hong Kong
- Language: Cantonese
- Box office: HK$11,031,668

Lan Kwai Fong 2 is a 2012 Hong Kong blue comedy film directed by Wilson Chin and produced by Li Kuo-hsing. Lan Kwai Fong 2 is the sequel to Lan Kwai Fong and is the second film in the Lan Kwai Fong theatrical series. It was released in Hong Kong, Macao and New Zealand on 23 August 2012, and grossed over $11,031,668 in Hong Kong. It was followed by sequels Lan Kwai Fong 3. The film stars Shiga Lin, Sammy Sum, Izumt Liu, Avis Chan, and Boey Chan.

== Cast ==
=== Main cast ===
- Shiga Lin as Summer.
- Kelvin Kwan as Rain.
- Sammy Sum as Don.
- Izumi Liu as Siri.
- Avis Chan as Avis.
- Mia Chan as QQ.
- Linah Matsuoka as Maxim.
- Ho Hou-Man as fai.

=== Other ===
- Cheuk Wan-chi
- Angelina Zhang as Angelina.
- Adason Lo as A Wei.
- Daniel Chau as A Bo.
- Benedict Chong
- Sita Chan as Sita.
- Liddy Li
- Jaime Fong
- Chiang Man Kit
- Vanko Wong
- Calinda Yuen-wai Chan
- Naomi Fung
- Jason Chung

=== Guest star ===
- Leo Ku
- Niki Chow
- Suen Yiu-wai
- Alex Fong
- Felix Wong
- William So
- Timmy Hung
- Jacquelin Chong
- Gregory Wong
- Ricky Fan
- Joey Tang
- Wang Xiao

== Music ==
- Leo Ku - No longer love
- Shiga Lin - Live well, I'm still loving you
- Kelvin Kwan - I'm nothing, Feat
- Benedict Zhuang - LKF Party People
- Imagine Dragons - Radioactive
- Sita Chan - Backup
- Jaden Michaels - Get Crazy
- Kaliyo (Sarah Sharp & Andrea Perry) - "Find Your Way"
- 24Herbs & Janice Vidal - "Wonderland"

== Released ==
The film premiered in Hong Kong, Macao and New Zealand on 23 August 2012.

The film grossed $11,031,668 in Hong Kong and it was only moderately successful with critics.
