= Dan Findlay =

Record producer

Dan Findlay is a record producer releasing music under the name Dan F. He is also a DJ and bar owner, based in Hong Kong. He is credited as one of the first Hong Kong based artists (alongside acts such as Technasia) to release contemporary club music (breakbeat, tech-house, minimal techno). Dan F has also released music under the aliases Red Buddha, Random Source (with Johan SoH a.k.a. Jariten, and Stisch) and Sinosine.

== Independent music ==
Dan F is highly active in the independent music scene of Hong Kong, with co-production and engineering credits on Ghost Style's M.I.C. and Alias albums, and co-production on former Anodize / Lazy Mutha Fucka member Davy Chan's (陳匡榮) solo album Unbreakable (the first locally produced electronica release for Warner Music Asia). Dan F has also remixed and produced music for local pop artists Josie Ho and Fiona Sit as well as former Beyond frontman, Paul Wong. He remixed James Lavelle's U.N.K.L.E. project on no less than three occasions and is currently collaborating with Lee Burridge.

== Discography ==
Sound of Habib Records (12" vinyl)

- "Halo" as Dan F & Jariten
- "Face Like A Robot" as Random Source
- "Zombie Ratz" as Random Source
- "Foo" as Random Source
- "Big Stupid Grin" as Random Source
- "Secret Weapon" as Dan F
- "Hakisack" as Dan F
- "You Weirdo" as Dan F
- "Thinking Murder" as Dan F
- "Present Tense" as Dan F

Dorigen Records (12" vinyl)

- "Recovery" as Red Buddha

Mob Recordings (12" vinyl)

- "One Country" as Sinosine
- "Two Systems" as Sinosine

Disuye Records (12" vinyl)

- "Close Yer Eyez" as Dan F
- "Double Take" as Dan F
- "Bluebox" as Dan F
- "Chinese Whispers" as Dan F
- "ECO" as Dan F
- "Namonamo" as Dan F
- "Zhenghe" as Dan F
- "Rebreather" as Dan F
- "Morocco" as Dan F
- "Interceptor" as Dan F & JP Oliver
- "Numchukka" as Dan F & JP Oliver
- "Tetrahydrazene" as Dan F
- "Go See Your Doctor" as Dan F
- "Morocco" as Dan F

Kilowatt Recordings (12" vinyl)

- "Line of Sight" as Dan F

Almost Anonymous (12" vinyl)

- "Skiiirt" as Lee Burridge & Dan F
- "Treat 'em Mean..." as Lee Burridge & Dan F

Dan F (12" vinyl remixes)

- "My Ego" Regurgitator - Valve (CD) / Sound of Habib (12*")
- "Burn my Shadow" U.N.K.L.E. - Surrender All
- "Inside" U.N.K.L.E. - Global Underground (CD release only)
- "I Need Something Stronger" U.N.K.L.E. - Global Underground
- "Frequency" Digital Pimp - En:Vision Records
- "Twisted Emotions" Hyper -Kilowatt Recordings
- "Electro-chunk" Stir-fry - Kilowatt Recordings
- "Lose Control" Stir-fry - Kilowatt Recordings
