= Lan Kwai Fong (film) =

2011 Hong Kong film by Wilson Chin

- Lan Kwai Fong theatrical poster
- Traditional Chinese: 喜愛夜蒲
- Jyutping: hei2 ngoi3 je6 pou4
- Directed by: Wilson Chin
- Written by: Mark Wu
- Screenplay by: Lam Fung
- Story by: Wilson Chin
- Produced by: Ng Kin-Hung; Li Kuo-Hsing
- Starring: Z.O.(Chen Zhi-Ming); Shiga Lin; Jeana Ho; Jason Chan; Dada Chan; Gregory Wong
- Narrated by: Jason Chan
- Cinematography: Parkie Chan
- Edited by: Matthew Hui; Azrael Chung
- Music by: Ronald Ng
- Production companies: Mei Ah Entertainment; Local Production Ltd. [hk]
- Distributed by: Mei Ah Entertainment; Gala Film Distribution
- Release date: 15 September 2011
- Running time: 97 minutes
- Country: Hong Kong
- Language: Cantonese
- Budget: HK$4,500,000
- Box office: HK$9,000,000

Lan Kwai Fong (Chinese: 喜愛夜蒲) is a 2011 Hong Kong film directed by Wilson Chin, starring Shiga Lin, Zo, Jeana Ho, Jason Chan, Gregory Wong and Dada Chan.

The film dwelt with subjects that were considered to be "daring" in Hong Kong at the time. The film takes place in the Lan Kwai Fong square, a place known for its bars, nightclubs, neon lights and luxurious appearance. It is considered one of the more famous areas of the city.

The film explores the lavish lifestyle of a group of wealthy young people. The film was deliberately cast with young actors and actresses to have a real feel. The story also looks at nightlife in Lan Kwai Fong, the ubiquity of temptation and the opened notions about love and sex in Hong Kong today, depicting the love stories of three playboys—bar manager Jacky (Jason Chan), wine salesman Steven (Zo) and rich Sean Yi (Gregory Wong), with their romantic interests Jeana (Jeana Ho), Jennifer (Shiga Lin) and Cat (Dada Chan).

== Plot ==
The movie follows three budding couples who frequent the Lan Kwai Fong nightlife. The protagonists include marketing distributor Steven, club manager Jacky, Lan Kwai Fong (flight attendants) Jennifer and Jeana, local man Cat, and lawyer Sean.

Steven and Jennifer:
Jennifer and Jeana are introduced to the Lan Kwai Fong club scene by their friend and co-worker Lin Lin. Steven who sees Jennifer outside the club is instantly attracted to her and the same goes for her, but once in the club Jennifer is pulled away to meet Lin Lin's rich friend Andy Lau from Shanghai. As Jennifer is calling for a taxi to go home she runs into a drunk Steven in the streets and helps him home. After a late night of further drinking together Steven ask if Jennifer could stay over being it's so late. What started out as a platonic sleepover eventually leads to sex. The next morning sensing love, Steven ask to see Jennifer again. The two eventually have a somewhat relationship, but due to misunderstandings and trust issues they have a huge fight on New Year's with Jennifer disappearing from Steven's life. The two run into each other several months later at a birthday party where Steven finds out Jennifer is now his boss Leslie's girlfriend, devastated he moves on. While on a date with his new girlfriend Nana he runs into Jennifer and Leslie and finds out that the two are now engaged, heartbroken he request to leave right away which leads to a fight with Nana. Leslie promotes Steven to their Australia head office, but on the same night he finds Leslie cheating on Jennifer and beats him up. At Sean and Cat's wedding party Steven finds out Leslie and Jennifer have broken up, not wanting to miss another chance he runs through the streets of Hong Kong searching for Jennifer to tell her how he truly feels about her.

Jacky and Jeana:
Club manager Jacky tags along to help Steven fix Lin Lin's friend Andy, but becomes interested in Jeana and wants to get to know her. Every time he tries to make his move his soon-to-be ex-girlfriend Mavis show's up. However Jeana seems to be more interested in her new found popularity among guys. With guys crawling all over her she soon becomes promiscuous by having quickies with strangers at the club bathroom. On New Year's the two eventually have a one-night stand at Steven's home. One night Jacky and Steven decides to hit a brothel together only to find out his ex-girlfriend Mavis has become a prostitute to get over him. Feeling guilty about how he coldly dumped Mavis he ask if Jeana could be by his side as he needs someone right now, but she is too busy getting to know other guys. With Jeana becoming the new man eater at the club the two end up as friends only.

Sean and Cat:
Lan Kwai Fong newbie, lawyer Sean is instantly drawn to club man eater Cat, but she has no interest in him. Cat only cares about who she'll have sex with that night. On New Year's Sean gets lucky when Cat picks him to have sex with. Sean who is serious about Cat confesses his feelings to her but Cat doesn't care and rejects him by telling him she does not like to have a second go with a guy. Soon Cat reevaluates her feelings for Sean when he stands up to a couple of guys that were sexually harassing her. After another night of sex together the two get in a committed relationship and get married later on.

== Cast ==
=== Main cast ===
- Z.O.(Chen Zhi-Ming) as Steven

An alcohol marketing distributor who is a regular at Lan Kwai Fong. Though he truly loves and cares for Jennifer, he lets what her friends say about him get to him which is one of the reasons that leads the two into breaking up. After several months apart he runs into Jennifer again, wanting to reconcile he is devastated when he finds out she has become his boss's girlfriend.

- Shiga Lin as Jennifer

A flight attendant from Canada that goes to Lan Kwai Fong for the first time. Even though she really loves Steven, she constantly questions him about his past girlfriends and if he also treats other girls the same as the way he treats her. After breaking up with Steven she gets together with Leslie without knowing he is Steven's boss but dumps him when she finds out about his philandering ways.

- Jeana Ho as Jeana

Jennifer's friend and fellow flight attendant who also goes to Lan Kwai Fong for the first time. After hitting the dance floor she is instantly drawn to the attention she gets from guys. Soon she becomes hook to the nightlife and becomes promiscuous by having sex with strangers she meets at the club.

- Jason Chan as Jacky

Eyeline wearing club manager. He enjoys frequenting the girls that goes to his club. He eventually changes his ways when he feels guilty about what happened to his ex-girlfriend Mavis who he coldly treated and dumped while she was pregnant with his child.

- Dada Chan as Cat

A regular at Lan Kwai Fong, she is known as the girl that will have sex with anyone. After meeting Sean, a guy who treats her differently from other guys she has slept with she starts to change her promiscuous lifestyle.

- Gregory Wong as Sean Yi

A lawyer and newbie to Lan Kwai Fong, he becomes drawn to Cat even though he is aware of her promiscuous lifestyle. He eventually becomes lucky on New Year's when he is chosen as the guy Cat decides to have sex with that night.

- Pal Sinn as Tyson (Ah Gong)

A retired triad boss. He owns the night club that the other characters frequent.

- Emme Wong as Belinda

Ah Gong's long suffering girlfriend who also helps him run the night club he owns.

- Miki Yeung as Milk

Steven's co-worker and Lan Kwai Fong regular. She has liked Steven for a long time and decides to take her chance on New Year's by coming on to him after his breakup with Jennifer, only to be rejected by him.

- Gary Cheng Ka-Wai as Roberto

A regular at Lan Kwai Fong who pretends to be a homosexual in order to take advantage of girls. Not taking Jacky's advice, he takes advantage of an underage girl and is beaten up by her older sister.

- Jun Kung as Leslie

Steven's womanizing boss. He becomes Jennifer's new boyfriend after her breakup with Steven. Though he is series about Jennifer he decides to have one last fling before marriage that eventually leads to Jennifer dumping him.

- Stephanie Cheng as Lin Lin

Jennifer and Jeana's friend and fellow flight attendant. She brings the two to Lan Kwai Fong to meet rich guys. She's materialistic and only cares about hooking up with a rich guy to receive expensive gifts.

- Bonnie Sin as Mavis

Jacky soon to be ex-girlfriend. She frequently goes to the club looking for Jacky, hoping he will take responsibility for her pregnancy but he coldly brushes her to the side and dumps her. She eventually has an abortion and becomes a prostitute to get over Jacky.

=== Cameos ===
- Race Wong as Club DJ
- Conroy Chan as Policemen
- Sherman Chung as Policewomen
- Bob Lam as Andy Lau
- Ben To as Jeff
- Vincent Kok as Club patron
- Chrissie Chau as Nana
- Ava Yu as Ava
- Tat Dik as himself
- Lawrence Cheng as Lin Lin's boyfriend
- Steven Cheung as Policemen

== Soundtrack ==
No official soundtrack was released for the movie. The songs featured in the movie are:

- "Wonderland" by 24HERBS ft. Janice Vidal
- "Hu Ge" by 24HERBS
- "I'm Still Loving You" by Shiga Lin
- "But Give It Time" by Nelly
- "Dignity 尊嚴" by Jason Chan

== Sequels ==
Due to the box office success of the first film two sequels were subsequently released. Lan Kwai Fong 2 follows a whole new group of night clubbers who frequent the nightlife of Lan Kwai Fong. Only Shiga Lin returns to the second movie playing a different character than the first movie. Lan Kwai Fong 3 has Jacky and Jeana from the first movie along with a whole new group of friends.

== Awards and nominations ==
Year	Ceremony	Category	Result
2012	Hong Kong Film Award	Best New Performer; Shiga Lin	Nominated
