= Pong Nan =

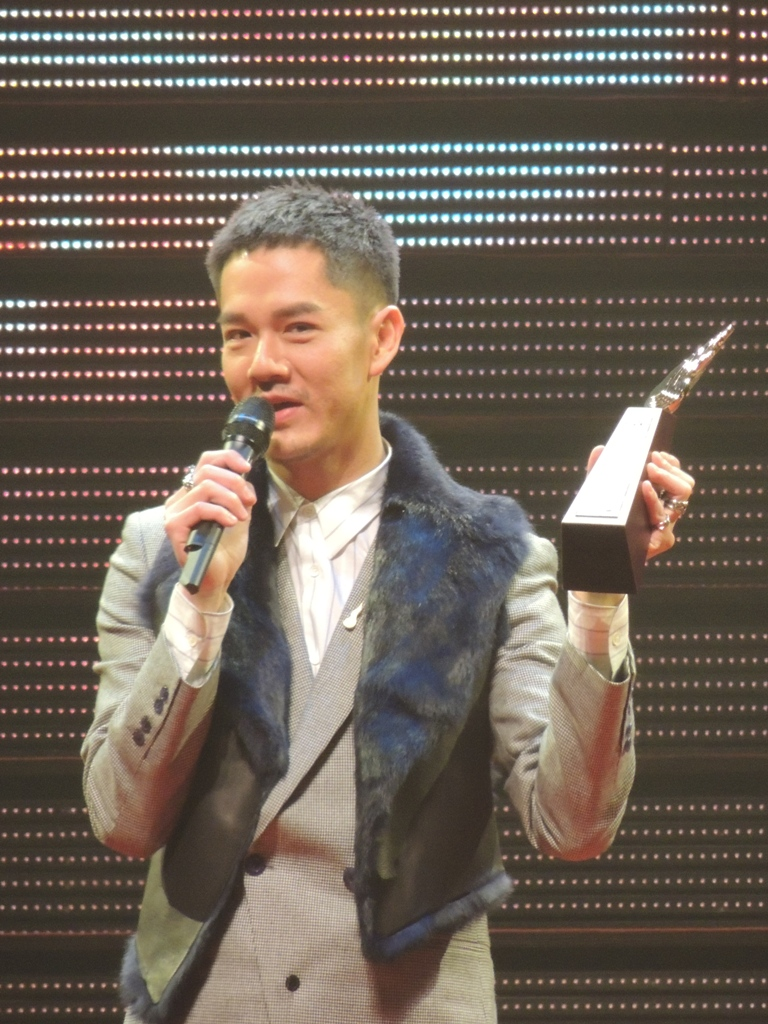
- Nan in 2013
- Born: Nan Yik Pong （藍奕邦） 15 May 1978 (age 48); Hong Kong
- Occupations: Musician; singer-songwriter; actor
- Years active: 2004–present

Chinese name
- Traditional Chinese: 藍奕邦
- Simplified Chinese: 蓝奕邦
Transcriptions
Standard Mandarin
- Hanyu Pinyin: Lán Yìbāng
- Musical career
- Also known as: Pong (阿邦, 邦邦)
- Origin: Hong Kong
- Genres: Cantopop, Mandopop, Hong Kong English pop
- Instruments: piano, acoustic guitar, electronic music
- Label: Cinepoly Records (2014–) EastAsia Music (2008–2014) Sony Music Hong Kong (2004–2007)

Nan Yik-Pong, better known by his stage name Pong Nan (Chinese: 藍奕邦, 蓝奕邦; born 15 May 1978), is a Cantopop musician, singer-songwriter and actor in Hong Kong of Hakka ancestry.

== Life and career ==
=== 1978–2004: Early life and career beginnings ===
In 1989, amid mass migrations due to unclear handover situation to China situation, at the age of 11, Nan and his family immigrated to Canada. Pong attended Centennial middle school followed by Georgetown District High School in Halton Hills. In 1993, Nan returned to Hong Kong and entered La Salle College to continue his studies until Form Six. Then he studied international politics and culture at Georgetown University in Washington, D.C., United States. He went to Waseda University in Japan for exchange in Year 3. After graduation in 2000, he returned to Hong Kong and worked as an office salesperson, while being a part-time musician for Harbour City and Fringe Club. During this time, he released some of his music online via MP3.com, and he composed Sound from Above 樓上來的聲音 for Jacky Cheung and Mad about You for Joey Yung. He was also the lyricist for Yung's Hill of Memories 舊日回憶的山丘.

=== 2008–09: Restart of career – East Asia Music and Nan/Blue 藍, Yik 奕 and Pong 邦 ===
Nan made his comeback a year after and joined East Asia Music in 2008. He released 3 consecutive EP albums namely Nan/Blue 藍, Yik 奕 and Pong 邦 depicting his early childhood and adulthood before beginning his singer-songwriter career.

=== 2012–13: Grace and Beauty 優與美 ===
2012 and 2013 were considered relatively successful period for Nan, as his digital single Cheers 為執著乾杯, released in 2012 summer, received his first ever number-one in the music charts (903 and TVB). The song encouraged positive thinking and more importantly highlighted his challenges against all the criticisms through his musical career. The song was even used as one theme song in the September protests against Moral and national education after release. Besides, retro electro You Are So London, I Am So New York 你倫敦，我紐約 and piano based Let's go to Alaska 一起去阿拉斯加 also went top of the charts.

In recognition of his outstanding results, Nan received the Cash Best Singer-songwriter Award at 36th Top Ten Chinese Gold Songs Award Presentation Ceremony.

=== 2014–present: Marking 10 years of singer career – Cinepoly and Caress 撫愛 ===
In May 2014, Nan took part in 903 id club concert with Miriam Yeung, Alfred Hui and Adason Lo. Afterwards, he joined Cinepoly to mark his 10th anniversary of career in June. Nan participated his company debut concert Universal Music Summer Hits Concert with fellow singers Eric Suen, Kary Ng, Kelvin Kwan in late June. At the same time, Nan released his debut song Love me then Kiss me 愛我就吻我. It became a hit and reached top three in RTHK, 903 and Metro charts. Subsequently, Nan held his personal debut concert Soliton Presents Pong Nan CARESS Live in August 2014 which he performed songs of his upcoming first Cinepoly album Caress 撫愛. Kary Ng appeared as a guest singer. The album was released later in September. Caress 撫愛 is Nan's first ever love album, which marked his change in personal thinking. He decided to embrace love, an aspect he was afraid to talk about before. His another song of the album, Lover 戀人, topped TVB, 903 and Metro charts, his first record in his 10-year career. Besides, it was successfully acclaimed by critics as well as commercially popular with over 10,000 copies sold in 3 months. It was then certified as gold record by HKRIA.

However, citing his neck injury, he decided to sideline and take rest until full recovery in late 2014. Nan returned to the scene in 2015 summer after 6 months of rest and would perform in Summer Pop Live in Hong Kong 2015 together with Ivana Wong, Adason Lo, Robynn and Kendy and Justin Lo

== Discography ==
- The Unadorable Pong Nan 不要人見人愛 (2004)
- Almost Happy 無非想快樂 (2005)
- The Sounds of Tide 潮騷 (2006)
- The Happy Prince Best Selections 快樂王子 創作精選 (2008)
- Nan/Blue 藍 (2008)
- Yik 奕 (2008)
- Pong 邦 (2009)
- Every Night Is Saturday Night 晚晚禮拜六 (2011)
- A Wonderful Sight 好風光 (2011)
- Grace and Beauty 優與美 (2013)
- Caress 撫愛 (2014)

== Filmography ==
- Once a Gangster (2010)
- SDU: Sex Duties Unit (2013)
