= Shiga Lin =

Hong Kong singer and actress (born 1988)

- 連詩雅
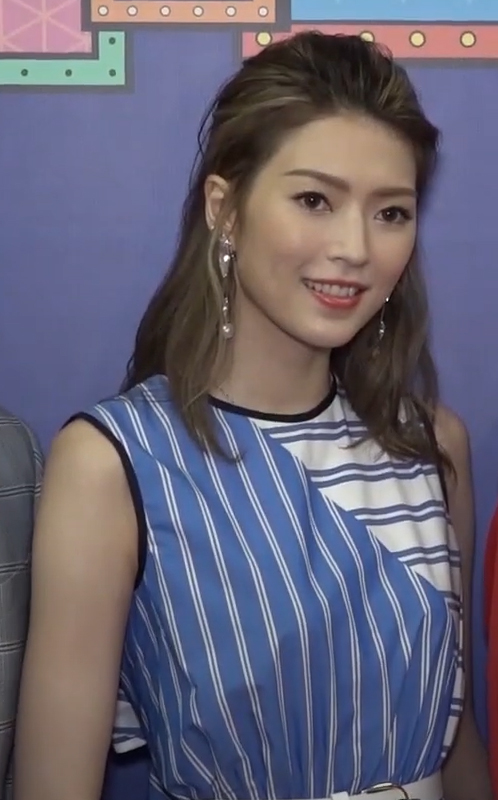
- Lin at the Jade Solid Gold Awards in 2019
- Pronunciation: Lin Sze-nga
- Born: June 29, 1988 (age 38); British Hong Kong
- Other name: Taguchi Shiga
- Citizenship: Japan
- Occupations: Singer; actress
- Years active: 2010–present
- Agent: StarzPeople
- Spouse: Carlos Chan (m. 2023)
- Children: 1
- Musical career
- Origin: Hong Kong
- Genres: Mandopop; Cantopop
- Instrument: Vocals
- Labels: Warner Music HK; HMV Music; Voice Entertainment
- Website: Official Instagram

Chinese name
- Traditional Chinese: 連詩雅
- Simplified Chinese: 连诗雅
Transcriptions
Yue: Cantonese
- Jyutping: Lin^{4} Si^{1}-ngaa^{5}

Japanese name
- Kanji: 田口 詩雅
- Kana: たぐち しが
Transcriptions
- Romanization: Taguchi Shiga

Shiga Taguchi, (Note: Taguchi Shiga (Japanese: 田口 詩雅)) better known as Shiga Lin Sze-nga (Note: Chinese: 連詩雅; Jyutping: Lin^{4} Si^{1}-ngaa^{5}) (born 29 June 1988), is a Hong Kong Cantopop singer and actress. As a singer, she is known for songs including "I'm Still Loving You" (2011) and "The End" (2012, 到此為止). As an actress, she is known for her performances in the film Lan Kwai Fong (2011) and television drama Life After Death (2020).

== Life and career ==
=== 1988–2010: Early life ===
Shiga Lin was born on 29 June 1988 in Hong Kong as the only child in her family. While her parents are from Hong Kong, her mother had acquired naturalised Japanese citizenship after studying and living in Japan. As a result, Lin became a Japanese citizen by birthright. Her family resided in Kowloon Tong where her father worked as a businessman, and her mother served as a translator at the Canadian Consulate General. During her childhood, Lin witnessed her parents' unhappy marriage, which left lasting scars. She later recalled that she often experienced solitude and longed for "the warmth feeling of a complete family". She attended King George V International School. Lin became interested in singing early and named Christina Aguilera and Sammi Cheng as her inspirations. As a child, Lin participated in ETV's English-spoken educational programmes.

At the age of 16, Lin moved to Hong Kong Island with her mother after her parents' divorce and eventually lost contact with her father. She then transferred to West Island International School. Initially feeling misplaced, she gradually adapted to her new living environment and took on various jobs to become financially independent and support her mother. However, struggling to cope with the changes in her life, Lin started sneaking into nightclubs despite being underage, using partying, drinking, and smoking as a way to cope with her grief. In later interviews, she regretted and referred to her action as "ignorant" and a "waste of time". In 2007, before her official debut, Lin took part in the ATV's youth drama Teen Waves.

=== 2010–2016: Career beginnings and early works ===
In July 2010, Lin made her official debut as a singer with the release of her debut song "Earl Grey" (灰伯爵的忌廉遐想). She signed with the record label Warner Music Hong Kong. Initially projecting a bright image, Lin soon embraced a bolder and more sexually provocative persona through her first film role in Lan Kwai Fong (2011). Set in the famous Hong Kong nightlife district, the theme explored the topic of sex, love, and temptation. Although hesitant at first due to the daring subject matter, she saw it as a good acting opportunity. The film received decent box office results, and Lin received a "Best New Actress" nomination at the 31st Hong Kong Film Awards. Lin also sang the film's theme song "I’m Still Loving You", for which she penned its English lyrics. The song became popular and was listed among "Top Ten Best-selling Digital Songs" at the 2012 IFPI Hong Kong Record Sales Awards.

Lin followed up with the second film installment, Lan Kwai Fong 2 (2012), which shared a similar theme. On the music front, she released her single "The End" (到此為止, 2012) which has arguably become her most well-known hit to date. Lin shared her personal story in the song, writing a love letter in English to an ex-boyfriend that was later translated into Cantonese by a lyricist as the official lyrics. Lin told in an interview it took singing the song about "a hundred times" before she could finally "let go of that relationship". It was honoured "Top Ten Chinese Golden Medley" at the 35th RTHK's Top Ten Chinese Songs Music Awards and "Best New Song" at 2012 Metro Radio Music Awards. Lin then released "Movin' On" (好好過, 2012) as her next single, signaling a transition from the old love, and in her own words, to "get on with my life". That same year, however, she was embroiled in a photo scandal in which kissing images between a 16-year-old Lin and her then-boyfriend were exposed. Continued to be plagued with other negative press, Lin endured a "bad girl" image for some time in the public's eye.

In the following years, Lin appeared in several films but struggles to find success in her acting career. On the music front, her song "Once Said" (說一句) was recognized as one of the "Top Ten Best Songs" at 2013 Ultimate Song Chart Awards. In 2014, "Gotta Be With You" (只要和你在一起) won the award for "Top Ten Digital Best-selling songs" at 2014 IFPI Hong Kong Record Sales Awards. The following year, her song "Old Street Corner" (舊街角, 2015) was honoured as one of the "Best Songs" at 2016 Metro Radio Music Awards, among others. In 2016, Lin held her first ticketed solo concert titled "Shiga vs. Shiga Live". During the same year, she formed the female band Dear John with fellow Warner Music Hong Kong artists Janice Vidal, Jill Vidal, and JUDE as a spin-off of the male band Dear Jane. However, due to Lin's departure from Warner Music Hong Kong a year later, the group was short-lived and only released three singles.

=== 2017–present: Life After Death ===
In 2017, a contractual infringement dispute arose between Warner Music Hong Kong and her management agency StarzPeople. Consequently, Lin briefly switched to HMV Music before ultimately signing with The Voice Entertainment in December 2018. In 2019, her single "Walk Alone" (孤身走) was among the "Top Ten Most Streamed Songs" of the year on the Joox music streaming platform. At The Voice, Lin's public image began to take a positive turn as she participated in television programmes at its parents company, television network TVB, showing a previously unseen side of her personality. In 2020, she landed her first major television drama role in Life After Death (2020), portraying an obstetrician with an estranged relationship with her older sister, played by Priscilla Wong. Her performance was warmly received. Lin also lent her voice to the drama's opening theme song “Little Lies” (小謊言, 2020), which was recognized among Top 3 best television theme songs of the year at the 53rd TVB Anniversary Awards.

In 2021, Lin's starring role in the musical micro-film A Hundred Miles Song, where she portrayed a murderer, earned her a Bronze Acting Award from the Hong Kong MicroFilm Association. The film also received a nomination at the 2021 Rising Sun International Film Festival. Lin continued having several other supporting roles in TV dramas including Line Walker: Bull Fight (2020), Murder Diary (2021), Barrack O'Karma 1968 (2022), In the Storm (2022), and Forensic Heroes V (2022).

== Personal life ==
Lin and fellow singer-actor Pakho Chau formed a lasting friendship and collaborated on multiple music and film projects. Additionally, she developed a close bond with Priscilla Wong and Yoyo Chen after working together on the TV series Life After Death (2020). Lin met actor Carlos Chan on the set of TVB's variety show 12 Summers (2019); they married in April 2023 and had a daughter, Camila, in July 2024.

== Discography ==
Most songs were released individually through digital mediums before being compiled into the following EPs:

- Moment (2010)
- Movin' On (2012)
- Once Said (2014)
- iTunes Session (2014)
- 大了一歲 (One Year Older) (2015)
- Another Me (2017)

List of songs recorded by Shiga Lin
Song	Performer(s)	Writer(s)/Producer(s)	Album	Year	Ref.
"All Spare" (到處留情) (cover)	Shiga Lin	Wyman Wong; Chan Fai-young	iTunes Session	2014	
"All U Need Is Love" (總是有愛在隔離)	Various Artists featuring Shiga Lin	Susan Tang; Lowell Lo	All U Need Is Love soundtrack	2021	
"Always With Me" (路再荒你在旁)	Shiga Lin	Alex Lau; Hayes Yeung	Non-album single	2022	
"AM/PM" (日落日出)	Shiga Lin featuring Pakho Chau	Terry Chui; Chan Wing-him; Leslie Chiang; Randy Chow; Nick Wong; Edward Chan	Non-album single	2014	
"A.T.L"	Shiga Lin	Chow Yiu-fai; Edward Chan; Charles Lee	Moment	2010	
"Be Good" (乖乖聽話) (Mandarin)	Shiga Lin	Xiaohan; Mancy	大了一歲 (One Year Older)	2015	
"Blood Revenge" (血一般紅)	Shiga Lin	Chan Wing-him; Terry Chui	Another Me	2017	
"Call You On Sunday" (等到Sunday就Call你)	Shiga Lin	Chow Yiu-fai; Johnathan Wong; Syu Man	大了一歲 (One Year Older)	2015	
"Cared Too Much" (太在意)	Shiga Lin	Damon Chui; Cheung Mei-yin; Johnny Yim	Non-album single	2021	
"Chill To My Heart" (心寒) (cover)	Shiga Lin	Albert Leung; Ronald Ng	iTunes Session	2014	
"Come On"	Shiga Lin	Chan Wing-him; Kenix Cheang; Syu Man	Once Said	2014	
"Day Before" (浪漫前夕)	Shiga Lin	Riley Pong; Larry Wong; Syu Man	大了一歲 (One Year Older)	2015	
"Don't Be Afraid" (你還怕大雨嗎) (Mandarin, acoustic cover)	Shiga Lin		Released on YouTube	2018	
"Don't Forget" (不要不記得)	Shiga Lin	Chan Wing-him; Fergus Chow; Syu Man	Once Said	2014	
"Don't Say Anything" (別說話) (Live cover)	Shiga Lin	Dear Jane	Shiga Love & Hope Unplugged 2012 Live	2013	
"Earl Grey" (灰伯爵的忌廉遐想)	Shiga Lin	Chow Yiu-fai; Khalil Fong; Edward Chan; Charles Lee	Moment	2010	
"Expected Accident" (不意外的意外)	Shiga Lin	Chan Wing-him; Justin Lo; Terry Chui; Edward Chan	Another Me	2017	
"First Love" (Japanese, cover)	Shiga Lin	Hikaru Utada; Kei Kawano	iTunes Session	2014	
"Gotta Be With You" (只要和你在一起)	Shiga Lin	Chan Wing-him; Kenix Cheang; Syu Man	Once Said	2014	
"He's Not You" (他不是你)	Shiga Lin	Alex Lau; Hayes Yeung; Nick Wong	Non-album single	2023	
"I Don't Wanna Be Lonely"	Shiga Lin	Vicky Fung; Joseph Wei	Moment	2010	
"I'm Fine" (不會有事的) (Mandarin)	Shiga Lin	Xiaohan; Pakho Chau	Non-album single	2017	
"I'm Still Loving You"	Shiga Lin	Shiga Lin; Robin Ch'i; Terry Chui; Edward Chan	Movin' On	2012	
"It Should Be" (本應)	Shiga Lin featuring Raymond Lam	Yuen Cheuk-kei; Nicola Tsang; Tang Chi-wai	Non-album single	2022	
"K.O.L."	Shiga Lin (as a part of Dear John)	Chan Wing-him; JUDE; Gareth Chan	Non-album single	2016	
"Let Me Go" (一走了之)	Shiga Lin	Riley Pong; Robin Ch'i; Terry Chui; Nick Wong	Another Me	2017	
"Limelight Years" (好男人)	Shiga Lin	Alex Lau; Freddie Lo; Hayes Yeung	Non-album single	2022	
"Little Lies" (小謊言)	Shiga Lin	Cheung Mei-yin; Alan Cheung; Herman To; Joseph Wei	Non-album single	2020	
"Love Is So Beautiful" (愛太好看)	Shiga Lin	Thomas Chow; Goro Wong	Moment	2010	
"Love Me, Don't Go" (爱我别走) (Live cover)	Shiga Lin	Chang Chen-yue	Shiga Love & Hope Unplugged 2012 Live	2013	
"Love Out Loud"	Shiga Lin featuring Dear Jane	Dear Jane	Non-album single	2012	
"Lovesick"	Shiga Lin (as a part of Dear John)	Chan Wing-him; Larry Wong	Non-album single	2016	
"Mercury Retrogade" (水星逆行)	Shiga Lin	Wyman Wong; Larry Wong; Syu Man	大了一歲 (One Year Older)	2015	
"Movin' On" (好好過)	Shiga Lin	Riley Pong; Agatha Kong	Movin' On	2012	
"Mr. Rainbow" (Mandarin)	Xu Liang featuring Shiga Lin		我 It's Me	2015	
"Old Corner" (舊街角)	Shiga Lin	Chow Lam; Robin Ch'i; Terry Chui	Another Me	2017	
"Once Said" (說一句)	Shiga Lin	Chan Wing-him; Larry Wong; Syu Man	Once Said	2014	
"One Year Older" (大了一歲)	Shiga Lin	Chan Wing-him; Gareth Chan; Agatha Kong	Once Said	2014	
"Our Hour" (我們一小時)	Shiga Lin	Chan Wing-him; Jone Chui	Moment	2010	
"Over Over"	Shiga Lin (as a part of Dear John)	Chan Wing-him; JUDE; Dear Jane; Zen	Non-album single	2016	
"Owe You Nothing" (不拖不欠) (cover)	Shiga Lin	Albert Leung; Chan Wai-kin; Adrian Chan	Itunes Session	2014	
"Passerby" (過路人)	Shiga Lin	Fiona Fung; Terry Chui	Non-album single	2019	
"Point Blank" (零分) (acoustic cover)	JUDE featuring Shiga Lin	Riley Pong; JUDE; Terry Chui; Robin Ch'i; Nick Wong	Released on YouTube	2020	
"Recovery" (別放棄治療)	Shiga Lin	Terry Chui; Albert Leung; Chow Lam; Hoi Yut; Yik Tze-zeon	Non-album single	2021	
"Relief" (说分手)	Shiga Lin	Riley Pong; Larry Wong; Syu Man	Non-album single	2019	
"Run" (起跑)	Shiga Lin	Leung Pak-kin; Endy Chow	Movin' On	2012	
"The End" (到此為止)	Shiga Lin	Riley Pong; Pakho Chau	Movin' On	2012	
"The Things We Do For Love" (愛情事)	Shiga Lin	Cheung Mei-yin; Alan Cheung; Herman To; Joseph Wei	Non-album single	2020	
"Time For Love" (讓我享受談戀愛)	Shiga Lin	Chan Wing-him; Joseph Wei	Movin' On	2012	
"Time Joke" (時間開的玩笑) (Mandarin)	Shiga Lin	Xiaohan; Jone Chui; Jonathan Wong; Syu Man	Once Said	2014	
"Torn" (Live cover)	Shiga Lin	Scott Cutler; Anne Preven; Phil Thornalley	Shiga Love & Hope Unplugged 2012 Live	2013	
"Unwilling" (不甘示弱)	Shiga Lin featuring Justin Lo	Chan Wing-him; Justin Lo; Edward Chan; Ariel Lai	Non-album single	2017	
"Walk Alone" (孤身走)	Shiga Lin	Cheung Mei-yin; Alan Cheung; Herman To; Joseph Wei	Non-album single	2019	
"When You're Gone" (cover)	Shiga Lin	Avril Lavigne; Butch Walker	Itunes Session	2014	
"Why Do I Love You" (為何要我愛上你)	Shiga Lin	Albert Leung; Yeung Jan-bong; Syu Man	大了一歲 (One Year Older)	2015	
"Yellow Fever"	Shiga Lin	Lam Bo; Dear Jane; Gareth Chan	Non-album single	2012	

== Filmography ==
=== Film ===
Year	Title	Role	Notes	Ref.
2011	Lan Kwai Fong	Jennifer		
2012	Lan Kwai Fong 2	Summer Lui		
2012	Blood Money	Ping Ho		
2013	A Secret Between Us	Kiki	Cameo	
2013	The Best Plan is No Plan	Flower		
2013	Stay Curious			
2014	Delete My Love	"delete to" Romantic		
2015	When Geek Meets Serial Killer	Nga-si		
2015	Big Fortune Hotel	Chan Siu-dip		
2016	My Wife is a Superstar			
2017	Love Off the Cuff	Veronica	Cameo	
2017	The Sinking City - Capsule Odyssey	Yip Wan-yi		
2020	The Infernal Walker	Sin-yeung (倩揚)		
2021	A Hundred Miles Song	Maria	Micro-Film	

=== Television series ===
Year	Title	Role	Notes	Ref.
2007	Teen Waves	Si-chai	Youth drama	
2017	Line Walker: The Prelude	Cheung Yuk-huen	Cameo	
2019	Sexy Central	Annie	Main Role / Web Drama	
2020	Life After Death	Sherman Fong Shu-man	Main Role	
2020	Line Walker: Bull Fight	Cheung Yuk-huen	Supporting Role	
2021	Murder Diary	Cheung Hiu-man	Cameo	
2022	Barrack O'Karma 1968	Florence Yip Fo-wan	Supporting Role	
2022	In the Storm	Tang Wai-shan		
2022	Forensic Heroes V			
TBA	The Spectator	Cheung Pak-yin		

=== Web series ===
Year	Title	Role	Notes	Ref.
2021–present	Sisters' Talk	Co-host		

== Awards and nominations ==
- Only major music awards are included per List of Hong Kong music awards. Most music nominations are excluded due to the lack of reliable sources.

Year	Award	Category	Nominated work	Results	Ref.
2010	33rd RTHK's Top Ten Chinese Songs Music Awards	Promising Newcomers	Herself	Won	
2010	2010 Metro Radio Music Awards	Best New Female Artists	Herself	Won	
2011	2011 Metro Radio Music Awards	Most Popular Female Singers	Herself	Won	
2011	31st Hong Kong Film Awards	Best New Actress	Lan Kwai Fong	Nominated	
2012	2012 Metro Radio Music Awards	Best New Media Song (Gold Award)	"The End"	Won	
2012	35th RTHK's Top Ten Chinese Songs Music Awards	Top Ten Chinese Golden Melody	"The End"	Won	
2012	2012 IFPI Hong Kong Record Sales Awards	Top Ten Digital Best-selling songs	"The End"	Won	
2012	2012 IFPI Hong Kong Record Sales Awards	Top Ten Digital Best-selling songs	"I'm Still Loving You"	Won	
2013	2013 Metro Radio Music Awards	Breakthrough Artists	Herself	Won	
2013	2013 Metro Radio Music Awards	Best New Media Songs	"Once Said"	Won	
2013	36th RTHK's Top Ten Chinese Songs Music Awards	Top Ten Chinese Golden Melody	"Once Said"	Won	
2013	2013 Ultimate Song Chart Awards	Best Top Ten Songs	"Once Said"	Won	
2013	2013 IFPI Hong Kong Record Sales Awards	Top Ten Digital Best-selling songs	"The End"	Won	
2014	2014 TVB8 Music Awards	Most Popular Female Singer	Herself	Won	
2014	2014 TVB8 Music Awards	Golden Melody Awards	"Time Joke"	Won	
2014	2014 Metro Radio Mandarin Music Awards	Mandarin Original Songs	"Time Joke"	Won	
2014	2014 Metro Radio Mandarin Music Awards	Popular Idol (Gold Award)	Herself	Won	
2014	2014 Metro Radio Music Awards	Breakthrough Singer (Gold Award)	Herself	Won	
2014	2014 Metro Radio Music Awards	Best New Media Song (Gold Award)	"Gotta Be With You"	Won	
2014	37th RTHK's Top Ten Chinese Songs Music Awards	Top Ten Chinese Golden Melody	"Gotta Be With You"	Won	
2014	2014 IFPI Hong Kong Record Sales Awards	Top Ten Digital Best-selling songs	"Gotta Be With You"	Won	
2015	2015 Metro Radio Mandarin Music Awards	New Media Song	"Be Good"	Won	
2015	2015 Metro Radio Mandarin Music Awards	New Media Singer	Herself	Won	
2015	2015 Metro Radio Music Awards	Best Female Singers	Herself	Won	
2016	2016 Metro Radio Music Awards	Best Songs	"Old Street Corner"	Won	
2019	2019 Jade Solid Gold Music Awards	Gold Song Awards (Year-end)	"Walk Alone"	Won	
2020	2020 Jade Solid Gold Music Awards	Gold Song Awards	"Little Lies"	Won	
2020	2020 Jade Solid Gold Music Awards	Gold Song Awards	"The Things We Do For Love"	Won	
2020	53rd TVB Anniversary Awards	Best Television Themesong	"Little Lies" (Top 3)	Nominated	
2020	Yahoo! Asia Buzz Awards	Popular Stars (in TV Category)	Herself	Won	
2021	Hong Kong Micro-Film Awards	Best Actress (Bronze)	A Hundred Miles Song	Won	
2021	Rising Sun International Film Festival	Best Short Film	A Hundred Miles Song	Nominated	

== Concerts ==
- Love Out Loud (with Dear Jane) (2012)
- Shiga Love & Hope Unplugged Live (2012)
- Shiga vs. Shiga Live (2016)
- SS 2017 Live Concert (with Stephanie Cheng) (2017)
