= Ava Yu =

Hong Kong actor

Ava Liu Yu-Kiu
- 廖羽翹
- Born: August 5, 1985 (age 41); British Hong Kong
- Other name: Yu-Kiu (雨僑)
- Education: Ying Wa Girls' School; University of Hong Kong (Bachelor of Science in Biology)
- Occupations: Singer; actress; hostess
- Years active: 2008–present
- Agent: Neway Group Holdings Limited
- Notable work: You are the Legend; Lan Kwai Fong 3
- Spouse: Adason Lo (m. 2018)

Chinese name
- Traditional Chinese: 廖羽翹
- Simplified Chinese: 廖羽翘
Transcriptions
Standard Mandarin
- Hanyu Pinyin: Liào Yǔqiáo
Yue: Cantonese
- Jyutping: liu6 jyu5 kiu4

Yuqiao
- Traditional Chinese: 雨僑
- Simplified Chinese: 雨侨
Transcriptions
Standard Mandarin
- Hanyu Pinyin: Yǔqiáo
Yue: Cantonese
- Jyutping: jyu5 kiu4

Ava Liu Yu-Kiu (born 5 August 1985) is a Hong Kong singer, actress and television host.

== Early life ==
Ava was born and raised in Hong Kong, where her junior primary studies were at the Cheung Chau Primary School, because her mother was a primary school teacher, Ava transferred to St. Clare's Primary School to continue her primary studies. Her secondary studies were at the Ying Wa Girls' School.

In 2002, Ava scored 26 points at the HKCEE Examination, then she was admitted to the University of Hong Kong, majoring in biology, where she graduated in 2007 and attained ABRSM grade eight piano certificate.

== Career ==
In 2009, Ava entered Hong Kong’s music industry, releasing singles such as “HKU Girls,” “Private Affair Official Handle,” and “Treat You Worse Just Want You Afraid.” In July, she launched a photo album at the Hong Kong Book Fair, with photos taken in Sabah, Malaysia. Later that year, she released her first full album, AVA.

Ava currently hosts a radio program with Shiu Tin Yi and Lam Chi To at the network radio station. She also shares beauty tips on YouTube, though her uploads are irregular.

At the end of 2013, the film Lan Kwai Fong 3 was released, with Ava in the lead role. Her performance in the film significantly increased her popularity.

== Personal life ==
Ava married singer-songwriter Adason Lo (羅力威) in Repulse Bay on March 31, 2018. The couple had been dating for seven years.

== Discography ==
=== Studio albums ===
Album #	Album Title	Production	Release Date	Track List
1st	Ava	一元製作室	21 Dec 2009	CD: 1. Bloodsucking new century 2. Treat you worse just want you afraid 3. Private affair official handle 4. HKU girls 5. Treat you worse just want you afraid (Theater Edition); DVD: 1. Treat you worse just want you afraid MV; 2. Treat you worse just want you afraid (Theater Edition) MV; 3. Private affair official handle MV; 4. HKU girls MV
2nd	AVAnt-Garde	一元製作室	10 Nov 2011	CD: 1. Causeway Love; 2. Big gorgeous home 3. Moonlight the fourth music chapter 4. Girls' talk 5. Thousands delicate hundreds beauty（"Big gorgeous home" Mandarin version）; DVD（Listen to me AVA Live）: 1. Bloodsucking new century 2. Big gorgeous home 3. Moonlight the fourth music chapter 4. HKU girls 5. Piano tears ("Moonlight the fourth music chapter" Mandarin version); 6. Private affair official handle 7. Treat you worse just want you afraid
3rd	You Serious, You Lose	一元製作室	27 Oct 2012	CD: 1. You Serious, You Lose (Mandarin); 2. Escape; 3. The queen's speech (Mandarin); 4. Tailless flying weight 5. Of not; DVD: 1. You Serious, You Lose (Mandarin); 2. Escape; 3. The queen's speech (Mandarin); 4. Tailless flying weight 5. Of not
4th	Ladiesnite	Star Entertainment	15 Apr 2014	1. Return the bitter love 2. No more to love 3. Wish; 4. Volar; 5. Countersink the bitter love（Wang Zongyao Chorus）

== Filmography ==
=== Film ===
Year	English title	Original title	Role	Notes/Ref.
2006	Confession of Pain	傷城	Bar girl	guest
2009	Murderer	殺人犯	Team B	guest
2010	The Fantastic Water Babes	出水芙蓉	Amy	
2011	Lan Kwai Fong	喜愛夜蒲	Ava	
2012	Natural Born Lovers	天生愛情狂		
2014	Lan Kwai Fong 3	喜愛夜蒲3	Sara	
2014	The Cabin in the Mountains	林中小屋		
2014	Iceman	3D冰封侠		
2014	Undercover Duet	猛龍特囧		
2017	Always Be With You	常在你左右	Siu-hung	
2017	The Sinking City - Capsule Odyssey	西謊極落：太爆‧太子‧太空艙		

=== Television ===
Year	English title	Original title	Network	Role	Notes
2019	Sexy Central	性敢中環	HMVOD, Netflix HK	Olivia	Main Role
2011	ICAC Investigators 2011	廉政行動2011	TVB		EP5
2020	Sorina Fok	好人好姐	ViuTV	Maggie	

=== Drama ===
- MicroSex Office 潮性辦公室
