= Undercover Duet =

2015 Hong Kong-Chinese film by Mark Wu

- Poster
- 猛龍特囧
- Directed by: Mark Wu
- Starring: Ronald Cheng; Mark Wu
- Production companies: Bozhi Pictures; Changsheng Investment; Meiya Great Wall Media (Beijing) 喜洋洋电影工作坊有限公司
- Distributed by: Meiya Great Wall Media (Beijing)
- Release dates: August 27, 2015 (Hong Kong); October 23, 2015 (China)
- Running time: 106 minutes
- Countries: Hong Kong; China
- Languages: Cantonese; Mandarin
- Box office: HK$7.01 million (Hong Kong); CN¥4.5 million (China)

Undercover Duet (simplified Chinese: 猛龙特囧; traditional Chinese: 猛龍特囧) is a 2015 action comedy film directed by Mark Wu. A Hong Kong-China co-production, the film was released in Hong Kong on August 27 and in China on October 23, 2015.

== Cast ==
- Ronald Cheng
- Mark Wu
- Ava Yu
- Yang Jianping
- Wang Chuanjun
- Louis Cheung
- Peter So
- Zhang Chi
- Terry Zou
- Tony Ho
- Tin Kai-man
- Kaki Leung
- Lau Kong
- Cheng Tse-sing
- Derek Wong
- Benjamin Yeung
- Angelina Zhang
- Wen Chao

== Reception ==
In Hong Kong, the film has grossed HK$7.01 million (US$905,000). The film has earned CN¥4.522 million at the Chinese box office.
