= Sita Chan =

- 陳僖儀
- Chan in 2011
- Born: Chan Ho-yi (陳皓儀); 10 March 1987; British Hong Kong
- Died: 17 April 2013 (aged 26); Yau Ma Tei, Hong Kong
- Education: City University of Hong Kong
- Occupations: Singer; actress
- Years active: 2011–2013
- Musical career
- Genres: Cantopop; Hong Kong English pop
- Instruments: Singing; piano
- Labels: Star Entertainment; Sun Entertainment

Chinese name
- Traditional Chinese: 陳僖儀
- Simplified Chinese: 陈僖仪
Transcriptions
Standard Mandarin
- Hanyu Pinyin: Chén Xīyí
- Bopomofo: ㄔㄣˊ ㄒㄧ ㄧˊ
- Wade–Giles: Ch`en2 Hsi1 I2
- IPA: [ʈʂʰə̌n ɕí ǐ]
Yue: Cantonese
- Yale Romanization: Chàhn Hēi Yìh
- Jyutping: Can4 Hei1 Ji4
- IPA: [tsʰɐn˩ hej˥ ji˩]

Sita Chan Hei-yi (born Chan Ho-yi; 10 March 1987 – 17 April 2013) was a Hong Kong Cantopop singer and actress. She began her career in 2011, and was a singer under the Sun Entertainment label. Teresa Carpio and Tak Bo Lam were her vocal tutors. Sita became a singer in 2011, and subsequently released two CDs and won several awards throughout her career.

On 17 April 2013, she died in a car accident in Yau Ma Tei, Hong Kong, at the age of 26.

== Biography ==
Chan attended singing classes and piano classes with her parents since a very young age. She attended Heep Yunn School for her secondary school education, and was involved in several singing competitions. In her secondary school, she was the member of the school's choir and fencing teams. On behalf of the participating schools' fencing competition, her team won the inter-school women's épée of the years 2003 and 2004. Moreover, she was the first runner-up in women's épée individual in 2004.

In 2005, Chan won the championship at her first singing contest. The judge then referred her to be a demo singer, and she became a part-time singer while studying at the City University of Hong Kong. She sang in public in shopping centres such as the apm and the Langham Place, as well as in banquets. From being a part-time singer, she accumulated a lot of valuable singing experience, and was appreciated by the entertainment agency. She signed an agreement with Crowning Talents as a singer in 2010. Next year, she graduated from the Department of Media and Communication of the City University of Hong Kong, obtaining a degree majoring in English for Professional Communications.

== Singer career ==
Chan officially began her singing career in 2011, after signing a contract with Star Entertainment, and her debut song was called "Sad Remembrance" (記念悲). She has mentioned in an interview that she was brought up her career by her parents, her idols Jade Kwan and Kelly Chen. Influenced by them and her past emotional experiences, she specialized in singing sad songs. In late 2011, she won the "newcomer impact award" in the Jade Solid Gold Best Ten Music Awards Presentation.

In the beginning of 2012, Chan joined the Sun Entertainment label, and continued the record distribution contract with Star Entertainment. Under the arrangement by Paco Wong, the entertainment agency, she put her first composed song "Lethe" (忘川) to the radio. This song's music video received 2.7 million view counts on YouTube, and became a top hit on TVB's Jade Solid Gold (JSG) chart. She also won an award for this song at the first season of JSG Excellence Choice.

On 16 March 2012, Chan released her first album "Crazy Love". On 16 June 2012, she held her first music live called "Crazy Love Music Live" at Kowloonbay International Trade & Exhibition Centre, and invited famous guests of the Cantopop industry to her music live, including Hanjin Tan, Justin Lo and Jade Kwan At the same time, she started to prepare for her second album, "Let Me Find Love". In July 2012, her song "Gossip" (蜚蜚), became the first hit of her 2nd album. This song was adapted from the Korean song "Back in Time" (시간 을 거슬러), originally sung by Lyn. The music video of "Gossip" was deemed successful and received 1.9 million view counts on YouTube. She subsequently sent three other songs from her second album to the radio charts. She released her second album on 19 December 2012. She was one of the few new singers in the Cantopop music industry to be able to release two albums in a year.

In March 2013, Chan represented Hong Kong at the Hong Kong Asian-Pop Music Festival, she sang her song "Gossip" to compete for the "Asian Super Star" award.

== Death ==
On 17 April 2013, at around 2:26 am, Chan reportedly lost control of her sedan car Lexus ES 300 due to bad weather and fog on the Hoi Po Road flyover, hitting the curb before crashing into the central divider. "Let Me Find Love" was her last song sent to radio. Many Hong Kong celebrities and many Hong Kong netizens expressed their condolences via various social media platforms, including Facebook, Twitter, Weibo, Hong Kong Golden, and Discuss forums.

=== Mourning activities ===
- 17 April 2013
  - Sun Entertainment issued a press release, stating that the entertainment agent Paco Wong and all staff at Sun Entertainment were shocked, sad and felt sorry about the sudden death of their singer Sita Chan, and that they will fully support and assist her family of her funeral matters. Sun Entertainment's official website also changed to grayscale tones.
  - City University of Hong Kong Alumni Relations Office website had published a mourning statement.
  - Heep Yunn School's official Facebook page had quoted the related news for mourning.
- 18 April 2013
  - Singer Jason Chan held his "Jason Chan & Friends The Next Moment Music Live" at Kowloonbay International Trade & Exhibition Centre, before the show starts, he initiated a minute of silence to mourn for Sita Chan.
- 19 April 2013
  - Sun Entertainment announced, in accordance with wishes of Chan's family, that it will launch her commemorative album, named "All the Best ...". The commemorative album will feature her unreleased tracks, old songs, demos, music videos, "Neway Music Live x Sita Chan" DVD of 29 December 2012, and the condolence messages from her family and friends.
- 10 May 2013
  - The family according to Sita's wishes, they decided to adopt the western funeral ceremony. The funeral venue was decorated with the colours of pink and white. The choir of her alma mater Heep Yunn School also presented psalm singing. Her funeral was scheduled on 10 May 2013, at the Po Fook Memorial Hall in Tai Wai.
  - Sun Entertainment released her music videos of her new songs, including "The Script of Love" (愛的劇本), "Love Me Not" (不愛我)...etc.
- 11 May 2013
  - On the day of funeral, Chan was sent to the Fu Shan Crematorium for cremation.
- 15 May 2013
  - Sita's commemorate album "All the Best ..." was scheduled to be released on that day.

== Discography ==
=== Albums ===
Date	Publisher	Type	Product Title	Track list
16 March 2012	Star Entertainment	EP	Crazy Love	1. Crazy Love; 2. Girl's Talk (姊妹團); 3. Evil Dead (屍變); 4. Let The Kite Fly (讓風箏飛); 5. Owe You (欠你); 6. Lethe (忘川); Bonus CD: 1. Sad Remembrance (記念悲); 2. I Was Too Silly (我太傻 – "Sad Remembrance" Mandarin version)
14 December 2012	Sun Entertainment	Album	Let Me Find Love	1. Gossip (蜚蜚); 2. Loud (嘈); 3. Backup (後備); 4. Disappointment Slush (失落冰); 5. Let Me Find Love; 6. Thousand Years (千秋); 7. Panoramic (全景); 8. Roller Coaster (過山車 – "Lethe" Mandarin version); 9. Lover No. 2 (第二愛人 – "Backup" Mandarin version)
15 May 2013	Sun Entertainment	Commemorative album	All The Best	CD1: 1. Crazy Love; 2. Girl's Talk (姊妹團); 3. Evil Dead (屍變); 4. Let The Kite Fly (讓風箏飛); 5. Owe You (欠你); 6. Lethe (忘川); 7. Sad Remembrance (記念悲); 8. Love Magic (愛戀魔法); 9. I Was Too Silly (我太傻 – "Sad Remembrance" Mandarin version); 10. The Script of Love (愛的劇本 Mandarin); CD2: 1. Gossip (蜚蜚); 2. Loud (嘈); 3. Backup (後備); 4. Disappointment Slush (失落冰); 5. Let Me Find Love; 6. Thousand Years (千秋); 7. Panoramic (全景); 8. Roller Coaster (過山車 – "Lethe" Mandarin version); 9. Lover No. 2 (第二情人 – "Lover Reserve" Mandarin version); 10. Love Me Not (不愛我 – "Gossip" Mandarin version); 'CD3; Sita's written and unpublished 16 songs demo: 1. World Only You; 2. RnB; 3. J+J; 4. Happyy; 5. Duet; 6. 68; 7. Apr-19; 8. Curse; 9. Mad; 10. Mommy Missy (想講一聲我愛你); 11. 5554343213; 12. Not that in love 13. Demo 2013 – AS Duet; 14. Sad.v2 demo 15. Sita Demo 4; 16. Smiley face demo 1; DVD1:Neway Music Live: 1. Let Me Find Love; 2. Crazy Love; 3. Backup (後備); 4. Wrong Person (錯的人); 5. Gossip (蜚蜚); 6. Loud (嘈); 7. Let The Kite Fly (讓風箏飛); 8. Medley: The Keys Left / Ambiguous / Gradually / The Best Position (留低鎖匙／曖昧／漸漸／最佳位置); 9. Sad Remembrance (記念悲); 10. Lethe (忘川); DVD2:MV: 1. Sad Remembrance (記念悲); 2. Crazy Love; 3. Lethe (忘川); 4. Gossip (蜚蜚); 5. Backup (後備); 6. Panoramic (全景); 7. Let Me Find Love; 8. The Script of Love (愛的劇本 – Mandarin); 9. I Was Too Silly (我太傻 – Mandarin); 10. Love Me Not (不愛我 – Mandarin)

=== Composed Tracks ===
- Lethe (忘川), Roller Coaster (過山車 – Mandarin version), BeLIEve (English version)
- Backup (後備), Lover No. 2 (第二愛人 – Mandarin version)
- Want to say I Love You (想講一聲我愛你)

=== Unreleased Tracks ===
- Other Than Sorry (除了對不起) – 2011
- BeLIEve (Lethe's English version) – 2012
- Want To Say I Love You (想講一聲我愛你) – 2013

=== Chart Standings ===
Chart Standings
Album	Song	903	RTHK	997	TVB	Remarks
2011
Crazy Love	Sad Remembrance (記念悲)	16	–	5	7	First released song
Crazy Love	Crazy Love	–	19	–	3	
2012
Crazy Love	Lethe (忘川)	14	13	3	1	First winning song (Promotional song of "Love in Time")
Let Me Find Love	Gossip (蜚蜚)	10	5	3	2	Sub theme-song of "Love in Time"
Let Me Find Love	Backup (後備)	–	–	2*	3*	Sub theme-song of "Lan Kwai Fong 2". Ranked 6th when first on the RTHK chart in 2012. Went on the TVB chart after her death. Went back on the RTHK chart after her death.
Let Me Find Love	Disappointment Slush (失樂冰)	–	–	4	–	
Let Me Find Love	Let Me Find Love	4	–	5	3	
2013
All the Best...	The Script of Love (愛的劇本)	–	–	–	–	

No.1 Songs in Each Chart
903	RTHK	997	TVB	Remarks
0	0	0	1	－

Legend:

- An asterisk denotes the song is still on the chart.

== Filmography ==
=== Dramas ===
- Love Love Love (戀 Love Love) – 2011
- How Long can Love Last (愛可以多狗) – 2012

=== Film ===
- Lan Kwai Fong 2 (喜愛夜蒲2) – 2012
- Love in Time (等我愛你) as Mo Kiu (毛嬌) – 2012

=== Short film ===
- Cheese Cake – 2013

== Awards ==
Awards
Host	Competition Name	Award Title	Award Winning Title
2011
TVB	Jade Solid Gold Round 3	Best New Singer	Sita Chan
Sprite	Sprite Charts 2011	Best New Singer	Sita Chan
2012
TVB	Jade Solid Gold Round 1	Winning Song	Lethe (忘川)
TVB	Jade Solid Gold Round 3	Winning Song	Gossip (蜚蜚)
Metro Radio	Metro Radio Hits Music Awards 2012	Best Metro Female New Singer	Sita Chan
Metro Radio	Metro Radio Hits Music Awards 2012	New Voice of Digital Music Award	Sita Chan
2013
TVB	Jade Solid Gold Best Ten Music Awards Presentation 2012	Best New Singer, Gold Award	Sita Chan
Commercial Radio	Ultimate Song Chart Awards Presentation 2012	New Singer Award (Bronze)	Sita Chan
Yahoo! Hong Kong	Yahoo! Popularity Award 2012	Best Singer and Composer	Sita Chan
Sina	SINA Music	My Favourite New Singer	Sita Chan
IFPI	IFPI	Most Sellable New Female Singer	Sita Chan
Southern Metropolis Daily	Chinese Music Media Awards	Best New Female Cantopop Artist	Sita Chan
