= Stephanie Cheng =

Hong Kong singer

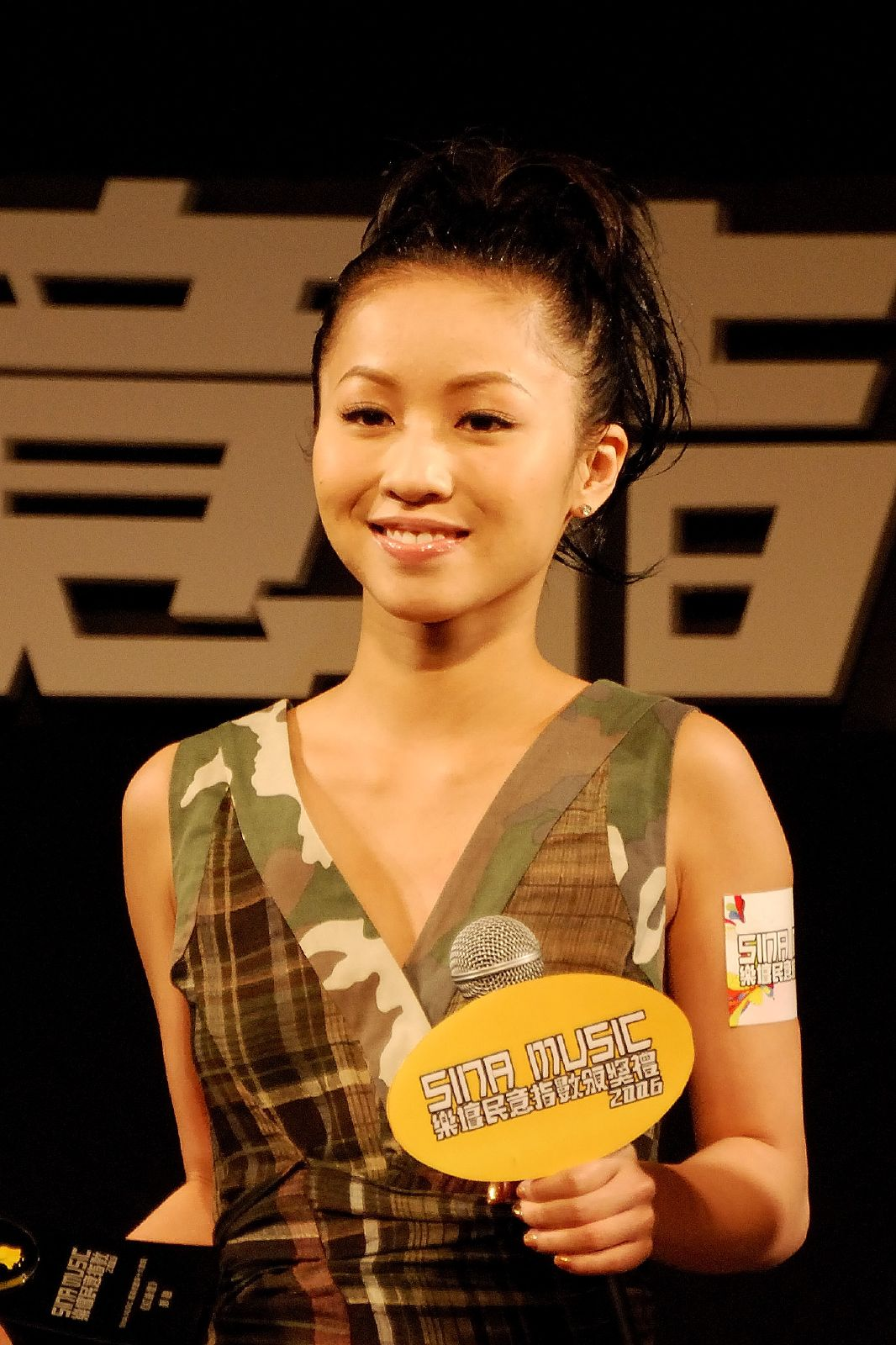
- Cheng in 2006
- Born: 10 October 1984 (age 41); British Hong Kong
- Occupations: Singer; actress
- Years active: 2003–present

Chinese name
- Traditional Chinese: 鄭融
- Simplified Chinese: 郑融
Transcriptions
Standard Mandarin
- Hanyu Pinyin: Zhèng Róng
Yue: Cantonese
- Jyutping: zeng6 jung4
- Musical career
- Origin: Hong Kong
- Genres: Cantopop
- Instruments: Vocals, piano
- Labels: hmv music (2016–present); Chessman Hong Kong (2014–2016); Star Entertainment (2007–2014); East Asia (2006–2007); Universal Music (2003–2006)

Stephanie Cheng (born 10 October 1984) is a Hong Kong cantopop singer. She debuted under Go East Entertainment with the song "Grown Up" in 2003 and has since released more than six albums and EPs. She is best known for her song "Traffic Light" 紅綠燈 released in 2006; the song topped all four major radio stations in Hong Kong and garnered many year-end chart awards.

== Life and career ==
=== 2003–2006: Career beginnings and breakthrough ===
She was born in Hong Kong and studied at Heep Yunn School and the Australian International School. After her graduation, she began modeling jobs until she was invited to be a singer. She took singing lessons from veteran singer Teresa Carpio. She signed a record deal with Go East Entertainment and a management contract with Starz People. In 2003, she made her debut with the single "Grown Up" 成人對待. She released her EP Grown Up on 27 November 2003. She released her first studio album Step by Step on 24 September 2004, promoted by the lead single "Red Flower Club" 紅花會. She returned the next year with the album Beat Beat, released on 18 October 2005.

In 2006, she signed with the record label East Asia Music 東亞唱片. The album Honey was released on 9 November 2006, preceded by the release of chart-topping single, "Traffic Light". The song reached number one on all four major Hong Kong stations (903, RTHK, Metro, and TVB's JSG).

=== 2007–2010: Super Girl, compilation album, and hiatus ===
In 2007, Cheng changed labels and signed with Star Entertainment 星娛樂. She returned to the charts with "Big Girl" and "Tokyo Department Store", earning five number-ones between the two singles. The album Super Girl was released on 19 September 2007. In 2008, she collaborated with Pakho Chau in the duet "Nothing Done" 一事無成, and with MC Jin on "Useless Love Song". Both these tracks were released in the album 23, released 30 October 2008. The album also contained the singles "Me Vs Me", "Health Education", and "Pay Back". In 2009, Cheng released her first greatest hits album, Stephanie Cheng New + Best Collection, containing 25 tracks, including three new singles. Cheng for the most part of 2010 took a hiatus from music, only releasing a duet (愛得起) with Linda Chung and "Queen of Karaoke" K歌之后.

=== 2011–2013: Spring/Summer 2011, EVO, 10-year anniversary ===
In 2011, Stephanie signed a management contract with Star Entertainment. She returned with the album Spring/Summer 2011 on 18 May 2011, with the intention of releasing a part two titled Fall/Winter 2011 containing dance tracks. Spring/Summer 2011 was supported by the release of "Kiss Kiss Kiss" and "Four Seasons" (written by Justin Lo), the former being a three-chart number one song. The album also featured songs composed by singers Ivana Wong, Pong Nan, and G.E.M. In 2012, she released her second EP EVO which spawned the singles "The Fifth Kind", "Gradually", and "I Just Wanna Dance". "The Fifth Kind" topped the RTHK and JSG charts.

Celebrating 10 years in the industry, Cheng released two compilation albums, Live Like 18 New + Best Selections Part One and Live Like 18 New + Best Selections Part Two in August and November 2013, respectively. Cheng's popularity rose again with chart-topping singles "Explode" and "Extraordinary Life". Cheng held her first concert Live Like 18 Concert on 6–7 December in Star Hall at the Kowloonbay International Trade & Exhibition Centre.

=== 2014–present: Chessman and HMV Music ===
In 2014, Cheng signed a five-year deal with the label Chessman Hong Kong. Her music at Chessman was noted by a deviation from her ballads, experimenting with electro and dance music.

In 2016, she returned to her first manager Starz People and signed with HMV Music, citing differences between her and Chessman. She co-headlined concert SS 2017 Live with singer-actress Shiga Lin at the Macpherson Stadium on 9–10 September 2017. In December 2017, she returned to the charts with the single "Unbreakable" 死不了的. The song reached number one on Ultimate 903 in 2018.

In 2019, Stephanie Cheng launched the title song "The Big Stupid Elephant on the 13th Floor", which was widely praised in online discussion areas and major media after sending the channel, and the trend on the pop song chart was very strong, becoming Stephanie Cheng's second song with four championships. Two years later, Cheng used the same team to release her next highly anticipated single "Drink More Water". The song was acclaimed by fans and major media immediately after it was released in early 2021. It was Cheng's third four-channel champion song.

== Controversies ==
On 4 June 2012, at a Metro Radio event, Cheng was interviewed by TVB host Shermaine Wong. Cheng was asked about her relationship with her boyfriend; she swore at Wong after the interview. This caused outrage with TVB and the interview was pulled from the broadcast. Wong later interviewed Cheng again and showed to the media Cheng's apology by text message.

== Discography ==
- Grown Up (2003)
- Step by Step (2004)
- Beat Beat (2005)
- Honey (2006)
- Super Girl (2007)
- 23 (2008)
- Stephanie Cheng New + Best Collection (2009)
- Spring/Summer (2011)
- EVO (2012)
- Live Like 18 New + Best Selections Part One (2013)
- Live Like 18 New + Best Selections Part Two (2013)
- Stephanie Cheng New + Best Selections (2015)

== Filmography ==
=== Films ===
- Trivial Matters (2007)
- Hooked on You (2007)
- Happy Funeral (2008)
- Split Second Murders (2009)
- Seven 2 One (2009)
- Lan Kwai Fong (2011)

=== Television shows ===
Year	Title	Role	Network	Notes/Ref.
2020	Beautivels	Host	HOY TV	EP1-2
2021	King Maker IV	Judge	ViuTV	EP1-15
2022	Youniverse	Judge	HOY TV	EP6-10
