= The Cabin in the Mountains =

- The Cabin in the Mountains poster
- Traditional Chinese: 林中小屋
- Simplified Chinese: 林中小屋
- Hanyu Pinyin: Línzhōng Xiǎowū
- Directed by: Gary Tang
- Screenplay by: Gary Tang
- Produced by: Chen Kewen
- Starring: Gregory Wong; Sienna Li; Mark Du; Ava Yu; A.Lin Pei; Sukie Wing-Lee Shek; Wei Yuhai; Gu Shangwei
- Cinematography: Liang Baoquan
- Edited by: Guo Xuanyu
- Music by: Kang Wai Ho; Corrnd Wang
- Production companies: Zhujiang Film Group Co., Ltd; Beijing East Light Film Co., Ltd; Mei Ah Entertainment
- Distributed by: Mei Ah Entertainment
- Release date: February 14, 2014
- Running time: 95 minutes
- Country: China
- Languages: Mandarin; Cantonese
- Box office: ¥4 million

The Cabin in the Mountains is a 2014 Chinese suspense crime film written and directed by Gary Tang. The film stars Gregory Wong, Sienna Li, Mark Du, Ava Yu, A.Lin Pei, Sukie Wing-Lee Shek, Wei Yuhai, and Gu Shangwei. It was released in China on Valentine's Day.

== Cast ==
- Gregory Wong as Jian Ming.
- Sienna Li as Na Na.
- Mark Du as Zhen Bang.
- Ava Yu as Mei Jin.
- A.Lin Pei as Bai Zhi.
- Sukie Wing-Lee Shek as Hai Di.
- Wei Yuhai as Jia Jie.
- Gu Shangwei as Ren Bao.

== Released ==
Mei Ah Entertainment released a trailer for The Cabin in the Mountains in Guangzhou on January 22, 2014.

The film grossed ¥4 million on its first three days and received positive reviews.
