= Adason Lo =

Hong Kong singer-songwriter

- Born: 9 June 1986 (age 40)

Adason Lo (Chinese: 羅力威; born 9 June 1986) is a Hong Kong singer-songwriter. In 2009, he won the first season of the first "Asia Star Avenue" competition and signed with Asia Television, officially entering the industry. His numerous first-place finishes earned him the nickname "Champion King." He signed with Emperor Entertainment in 2012 and released his first solo album that same year.

== Personal life ==
Lo was born on 9 June 1986. He and artist Ava Yu dated for 7 years. On 5 February 2018, they both announced that they had registered their marriage on 31 March of the same year. The wedding was held in Hong Kong. On that day, the two held their wedding at Repulse Bay.
