= Lazy Mutha Fucka =

Cantonese hip-hop group

LMF
- Years active: 1993-2003, 2009-present

Chinese name
- Traditional Chinese: 大懶堂(Lazy Hall)
Transcriptions
Yue: Cantonese
- Jyutping: daai6 laan5 tong4
- Musical career
- Origin: British Hong Kong
- Genres: Rapcore, rap rock, Hong Kong hip hop, nu metal, rap metal, gangsta rap
- Label: Warner Music (1999-2003)
- Members: MC Yan (陳廣仁); DJ Tommy (張進偉); Kit (梁永傑); Phat (陳偉雄); Prodip (梁偉庭); Kevin (李健宏); Wah (孫國華); Jimmy (麥文威)
- Past members: Gary (鄭華勝); Kee (洪柏琪); Sam (李燦森); Kit (馬文傑); Davy (陳匡榮)

LMF, also known as Lazy Mutha Fucka or Lazy Muthafucka, is a Cantonese hip-hop group in Hong Kong. The group, signed to Warner Music, was founded in 1993, disbanded in 2003 and regrouped in 2009. Some members of LMF are pursuing solo careers.

In contrast with the norm of commercial and packaged Cantopop, LMF write and perform original music. All members of the group hail from poverty and their songs often depict life and struggle in the underclass and working class, and are frequently controversial for their swearing and provocative subject matter. The band are not embraced by mainstream media for reasons that include their perceived negative influence on Hong Kong youth, their promotion of the hip-hop attitude, and their rough appearance that contrasts with the well-dressed and clean-cut performers managed by the music industry.

LMF offers Hong Kong an alternative to Cantopop. LMF is rare or even unique as a well-known local rap group. LMF highlights the economic oppression and social alienation faced by the lower class of Hong Kong, all coming from Hong Kong's overcrowded public housing.

LMF's attempt to establish a foothold in the highly commercial and monopolistic Hong Kong music industry is widely considered to be a success despite achieving only moderate commercial sales, due to their longevity, their name recognition (mostly in negative press coverage), and the original form of music they create. They have a small but die-hard fan base in Hong Kong and Southeast Asia.

Their last and final album, finalazy, was released just before their breakup in 2003.

LMF reformed in December 2009, ten years after their debut release, and went on the "Wild Lazy Tour", including venues in Singapore and Hong Kong.

== Early years ==
LMF was founded in 1992 by Cheung Yee Sic (張以式), known as Ar Sik (亞式). Cheng was the founder and organizer of "Dark Entry", an annual rock concert featuring local underground bands. Initially, Cheng named his band 重金屬同學會(translation: Heavy Metal Students Association) and gave it an English name: Lazy Mother Fuckers.

Initially LMF was merely a banner under which musicians from different bands got together and played; it did not have set members and there was no intent to create original music. Cheng called the group more of a club than a band. At the finale of each Dark Entry concert, members of various bands that had performed that night would come together on stage and jam and perform as this loose collective, often fifteen or more players. Musicians from many talented Hong Kong bands - including Anodize, Zig Zag, Zenith, Fraina and Martyr - have at one time or another lent members to LMF at the Dark Entry concert.

Dark Entry lasted a few years before financial problems led to its discontinuation. With the disappearance of Dark Entry, Cheng and LMF also went into hiatus.

== The Revival ==
In 1996, an unknown young DJ from Hong Kong shocked many by defeating several favourites and taking second place in the DMC World DJ Championships. DJ Tommy's accomplishment caught the attention of Hong Kong music executives and soon the young DJ received financing to release a six-song self-titled album. DJ Tommy solicited veteran underground rapper and graffiti artist MC Yan (real name: Chan Kwong-yan) to be a guest vocalist. The release created a minor controversy for its swearing and sales were disappointing in a market dominated by commercial Cantopop. However, the collaboration between DJ Tommy and MC Yan went so well that they decided to form a band.

MC Yan had just left his longtime band N.T. (New Territory) over creative differences (he wanted to incorporate hip hop into their music while his bandmates wanted to play strictly speed metal). A well known and respected artist in the indie music circle, MC Yan had no trouble recruiting some of the best talent in Hong Kong: lead guitarist Kee (from the band Screw), rhythm guitarist Prodip, drummer Kevin, vocalists Kit and Phat.

Around this time heavy metal band Anodize, the most popular yet financially struggling indie band in Hong Kong decided to call it quits. All band members intended to retire from the music scene until they were approached by MC Yan and DJ Tommy, who were hoping to recruit Jimmy to play bass but were delighted when lead singer Wah and drummer/guitarist/keyboardist Davy decided to join too. A fourth Anodize member, Gary, joined the band as a part-time member. The addition of Anodize's former members added gravitas and musicianship to a group already loaded with talent. MC Yan decided to adopt the LMF name and the band was formally formed in 1998.

It is unclear what role, if any, founder Cheung Yee Sik (張以式) played in LMF's revival. Most critics attribute MC Yan (lead singer of N.T.) and DJ Tommy for turning LMF into a mostly hip hop band, one that mixes rap with heavy metal/rock.

LMF dropped the Chinese name 重金屬同學會 and named themselves 大懶堂 (Lazy Hall). The band's English name was altered from Lazy Mother Fuckers to Lazy Mutha Fucka.

LMF ultimately stabilised with a fixed roster of members, instead of the former "revolving door". MC Yan still holds that he considers LMF more of a community than an actual band. He also said he's amazed at the smoothness of the creative process given the input of so many members. He attributes their creative success to all members sharing a vision of where they want to take their music. The ten full-time members and two part-time members are:

Full-time members:

- MC Yan (vocal)
- Kit (vocal)
- Phat (vocal)
- Wah (vocal)
- DJ Tommy (turntable)
- Davy (drum and guitar)
- Kevin (drum)
- Jimmy (bass guitar)
- Kee (guitar)
- Prodip (guitar)

Part-time members:

- Gary (guitar / bass guitar)
- Sam (vocal)

=== 20th anniversary festival ===
In 2019, the band announced a 20th anniversary festival on 28–29 December, called LMFXXYEARFEST, featuring Matt Force, Dough Boy, Future, Seanie, Tommy, KZ, Akiko, JB, 黃禍, Heyo, Phoon, Josie and The Uni Boys, R.O.O.T, 逆流 and My Little Airport.

== Music ==
In the late nineties, LMF played at various clubs and generated a lot of buzz in the indie music scene. They released their self-titled debut album in 1998 under their own label - A.Room Production ("A Room Studio" is the name of the studio where they recorded the album. It's also the location where Anodize, Screw, and N.T. recorded before they joined LMF). The album features six songs and sold almost 100,000 copies worldwide, an unheard-of feat for a Hong Kong indie band without backing from a major label.

In 1999, they released a self-titled EP, which was controversial but gained them commercial success.

With the band having so many members across different genres, LMF's music can be best described as a diverse yet coherent mix of hip hop, rock and thrash metal, with occasional funk or even reggae thrown in. The genius lies in their ability to seamlessly mesh together all genres. For example, "傲氣長存" features a thrash metal-like intro, evolves into a funk beat, turns into a brief hip hop mix before returning to the funk beat with rap vocal. The chorus is thrash metal with singing vocal and the interlude is speed metal with heavy guitar muting and rap vocal on top.

The song 大懶堂 (Lazy Hall), using a hypothetical aftermath of winning the lottery as a backdrop to critique Hong Kong's competitive and stressful environment, struck a chord with the listening audience and is arguably the band's most popular hit. However, LMF made no attempt to follow up 大懶堂's commercial success with similar radio-friendly songs, preferring to explore new directions for their music.

Unlike most acts in the Hong Kong industry, LMF retain total control of their music creation (under their agreement with the music label) and the band have made clear they are under no pressure to produce commercial hits and would never succumb if there were any.

== Controversy ==
LMF represents the youth culture and attitudes in Hong Kong. They have a subtle but great influence on Hong Kong popular culture.

The title of one of their most popular songs, "冚家拎" (Hum Ga Ling), is one of the strongest curses in Cantonese mingled with English phrases like "You know what the fuck I'm sayin~". In English, "Hum Ga Ling" literally means "Send one's entire family to hell (or death)". The song is packed with swearing in Cantonese and English. In ever-conservative Hong Kong society, LMF remained low key, though they were well received underground.

The emergence of LMF also caught the attention of Hong Kong's educational authorities (HKEAA). The 1999 HKASL Chinese & Chinese Culture Paper II (Cultural Problems), asked candidates to comment on the statement "Foul Songs Display True Art".

== Culture ==
Behind the profanity of "冚家拎" lies a deeper message. Another popular song by LMF, "1127", is a tribute to Bruce Lee. The song encourages young Chinese to take pride in their rich Chinese ancestry, culture, and history. Notable lines from the lyrics include:

We only want you to become a Chinese you can be proud of. Learn from others; Need not copy. Use your heart to digest the knowledge of others. Try asking why there are so many failures here who do not support each other and always pretend to be like other people. [Chorus] We had Bruce Lee teach us we are not the "Sick Man of Asia". Though having yellow skin, we can still be ourselves. Do not follow, copy, and be like the other. Do not look down upon ourselves.... The spirit of Bruce Lee will never die and the Chinese will never forget that.

A documentary about the band, Dare Ya! (Cantonese title: 大你), is based around interviews with the various band members.

== Politics and society ==
The band members all grew up on Hong Kong's crowded public housing estates, and the group's music addresses the economic oppression and social alienation faced by working class Hong Kong people, especially youth. They are critical of political and economic instability in the city, such as the Asian financial crisis, as well as the incompetence of local political leaders, such as the song "WTF". They also attempt to reinforce a distinct and unique Hong Kong cultural identity, urging the youth of Hong Kong to be proud, as in the song "1127", taking Bruce Lee as a Chinese role model.

Many of LMF's songs reflect the cultural problem of modern Hong Kong society's lack of any identity for today's youth to look up to and be proud of. Their song "債" (Debt) observes that many Chinese parents send their children to the opposite side of the world only to have them grow up to be "Caucasians with yellow skin" (Cantonese lyrics: "黃皮膚嘅鬼仔") while the parents distance themselves from their own children and neglect the responsibility of raising them.

LMF often criticise Hong Kong's music culture. In the song "傲氣長存" and "樂壇班霸" they say that Hong Kong is no place for music, but rather entertainment in the form of scandals created by the paparazzi. In "傲氣長存", they also criticise producers inability to make good music in a line that roughly translates as "if you don't fucking know how to be creative, then don't be so conceited."

In the song "冚家拎", the majority of the song criticises Hong Kong's corrupt society. They accuse the paparazzi of making up fake news and publishing subjective opinions to sell their newspapers and magazines. They also express anger toward adult content and the illegal gambling content (soccer betting) found in newspapers.

== Mainstream and television appearances ==
In 2000, beer brewer San Miguel Corporation terminated their contract with Hong Kong movie star Tony Leung Ka Fai and signed LMF to star in six different commercials for the beer company. The commercials ran during Christmas and Lunar New Year. The song "Para Salud" was recorded to air in the beer commercial, and was also on their album LMFAMiGLiA.

In 2001, the band supported "Cantopop Diva" Sammi Cheng for an 11-night stint at the Hong Kong Coliseum.

== Trivia ==
- The beginning of WTF on Finalazy samples Shirley Bassey's theme song for the 1971 James Bond film, Diamonds Are Forever.
- In the song "Thank You", one of the people thanked is 亞式, the original founder of LMF.
- Popular artist Michael Lau released several series of collectable vinyl figures based on some members of LMF. The "Crazy Children" is a line of collectable Lau figures that includes Davy, Prodip, MC Yan and DJ Tommy. "Crazy Children" is also the name of a song on LMF's "Crazy Children" album. Lau also designed some of the album covers and posters for LMF and is close friends with several of the LMF members. Other covers are designed by the group members.

== Discography ==
=== Albums ===
Studio albums

- The Ultimate s...Hits
- LMFsHits Greatest Hits 2CD
- Finalazy
- LMF Videophile
- L.M.F.CRAZYCHILDREN [2nd version]
- L.M.F.CRAZYCHILDREN
- the realazy mofo. DBF
- Respect For Da Chopstick Hip Hop
- LMFAMiGLiA LIVE
- LMFAMiGLiA
- Lazy Family 大懶堂
- Lazy Family 大懶堂 EP
- Gardener VS LazyMuthaFucka
- LazyMuthaFucka [Taiwan version]
- LazyMuthaFucka
- HMA - The Latest Independence Music Of HK 自主音樂圖鑑 track 09 "同床"
- DJ Tommy - Scratch Rider
- Dj Tommy-Respect 4 Da Chopstick HipHop
- Anodize - Anodize 4
- The Explosive Original Sound Track Gen-X Cops track 02 "XXXX"
- William So - 蘇永康的化粧間 track 07 "詐唔知"
- Ronald Cheng - One More Time
- Aroom Represents
- Lazy Clan

== Disbanding and reunion ==
LMF disbanded in 2003, in part because the group was too large, with usually 10 members in each concert, as well as the difficulty of broad acceptance of their often controversial music. Members are now pursuing their own solo careers, with some forming and joining new bands while others step outside the music industry. Kit and Phat launched 24HERBS, a rap group. Phat is also the lead singer of punk rock band Hardpack, with Kevin on the drums. MC Yan has helped Edison Chen on several of his albums, making hip-hop and rap more accessible to mainstream audiences. On the underground side, MC Yan has worked with several MCs and formed a new group, Yellow Peril. Davy is DBF and still active in the music scene, most notably as a drummer in various concerts for Eason Chan. MC Yan also the founder of 福建音樂 Fu©Kin Music. while, tangentially to the music industry, Jimmy runs a popular BMX shop called DJ BMX Workshop.

After a six-year hiatus, LMF returned to the music scene in 2009 to release one new single Clutching the Middle Finger (揸緊中指) reflecting the increasing anger of contemporary youth at the incompetence of the establishment and the increasing lack of social mobility for young people.

In 2018 and 2019 they held a series of reunion shows.
