= 24Herbs =

Hong Kong hip hop group

24Herbs 廿四味
- Occupations: Hip hop group; Rappers; Songwriters; Actors; Podcast hosts
- Years active: 2006–present
- Publishers: Drum Music Limited
- Website: 24Herbs' website
- Musical career
- Origin: Hong Kong
- Labels: Revolution
- Members: Phat Chan（陳偉雄） Kit Leung（梁永傑） Conroy “Drunk” Chan (陳子聰); Brandon "Ghost Style" Ho; Julius Brian "Sir JBS" Siswojo; Eddie "Dor Yuk" Chung (鍾恩泰)

Chinese name
- Traditional Chinese: 廿四味
- Simplified Chinese: 廿四味
- Literal meaning: Twenty four flavors
Transcriptions
Standard Mandarin
- Hanyu Pinyin: niàn sì wèi
Yue: Cantonese
- Jyutping: jaa6 sei3 mei6*2

24Herbs (stylized as 24HERBS, Chinese: 廿四味; Jyutping: jaa6 sei3 mei6*2; pinyin: niàn sì wèi) is a Hong Kong hip hop group formed in 2006 consisting of six members: Ghost Style, Phat Chan, Kit Leung, Sir JBS, Drunk and Dor Yuk.

== History ==
=== Early years and self-titled debut album (2006–2010) ===
24Herbs was first formed in 2006. In 2008, the group released their self-titled debut album 24Herbs. The deluxe version of the album included a remix of their song Jiu Jo (照做) with a guest feature from Chinese-American rapper MC Jin.

During this time, 24Herbs collaborated with various other artists, including on Forgiveness with Sammi Cheng, Laser with Charmaine Fong and Love The Most (愛最大) with Nicholas Tse. They were also actively involved in the Hong Kong film industry: they wrote and performed the theme song for the film Once a Gangster, and guest-starred in the film.

=== Bring It On and Sleeping Dogs (2011–2012) ===
In March 2011, 24Herbs released their second album, Bring It On. The record featured a number of songs with featured vocalists, including Wonderland with Janice Vidal, the music video for which has over 10 million views on YouTube as of 2021. Additional collaborations include Control with Paul Wong and Chillax with Taiwanese rapper Softlipa, as well as a collaboration with fellow Hong Kong group Kolor on the bonus track 24K.

24Herbs performed several live shows to promote the album including "24K Concert" in December 2010, in which they shared stage with Kolor and in "Moov Live 24Herbs" in January 2011, which was also documented and compiled along with multiple official music videos as a bonus DVD in the release of Bring It On.

Five tracks from Bring It On are featured on the soundtrack of the 2012 video game Sleeping Dogs: Turn It Up, Do You Know Me, Hong Kong Kowloon, Sin City and No Brothers (不是兄弟) featuring Hong Kong rapper KZ. The group's popularity increased with international audiences due to the video game's popularity.

=== Non-album singles, 24/7TALK podcast (2013–present) ===
Since the release of Bring It On, 24Herbs have released a number of non-album singles on their YouTube channel and streaming services, including Hot In The 852 in 2013, Work It in 2015, Go Hard in 2017, and M.L.Y. in 2019.

Since 2017, 24Herbs have hosted a podcast on their YouTube channel named 24/7TALK, in which they regularly invite well-known local and international celebrities on as guest speakers. These guests have included Chapman To, Daniel Wu and Eric Tsang.

== Members ==
- Phat Chan: Hong Kong rapper, actor, cinematographer, editor, member of Hong Kong hip-hop group LMF
- Kit Leung: Hong Kong rapper and actor, member of Hong Kong hip-hop group LMF
- Conroy Chan (born 1972 in Hong Kong), also known as Drunk: Hong Kong actor, producer and rapper, starred in over 30 movies, was once a member of pop group Alive
- Brandon Ho (born 1973 in Montreal, Quebec, Canada), better known as Ghost Style or Gee Style: Chinese-Canadian rapper, producer, DJ, guitarist and actor
- Julius Brian Siswojo (born 1974 in Jakarta, Indonesia), better known as Sir JBS, Sir Eats-a-Lot, or simply JBS: Indonesian rapper, actor, skateboarder, fashion designer, founder and owner of Hong Kong-based skate shop 8FIVE2
- Eddie Chung, also known as Dor Yuk: Owner of Drum Music Ltd, Hong Kong commercial music producer and actor. He has scored music for thousands of TV commercials and 5 feature films including "It Had To Be You", "Hot Summer Days", "Love In Space", "Bride Wars", "Fall In Love Like A Star".

== Discography ==
=== Studio albums ===
List of studio albums with details
Title	Album details
24Herbs	Released: 24 February 2008; Label: Drum Music, East Asia Music; Format: CD, 2×CD, digital download
Bring It On	Released: 24 March 2011; Label: Drum Music, East Asia Music; Format: CD, CD+DVD, digital download

=== Singles ===
List of singles as lead artist, with selected chart positions and album name
Title	Year	Peak chart positions				Album
Title	Year	903	RTHK	997	TVB	Album
"Respect Tou PK"	2008	10	—	—	—	24Herbs
"Champions"	2008	—	—	—	—	24Herbs
"Hu Ge!"	2009	—	—	—	—	Bring It On
"Do You Know Me"	2009	—	—	—	—	Bring It On
罪與罰	2009	1	2	2	—	Faith
"24K"	2010	20	—	—	—	As Simple As
"Wonderland"	2011	—	4	2	—	Bring It On
"Control"	2011	20	—	2	—	Bring It On
"Fashionista"	2011	11	—	—	—	Bring It On
"Big Man"	2011	11	9	—	1	Non-album singles
"Hot in the 852"	2013	2	4	—	—	Non-album singles
愛最大	2013	1	1	—	—	鋒味
"Work It"	2014	14	15	5	—	Non-album single
戰勝自己	2014	—	7	5	—	Miracle Best Collection
"Go Hard"	2017	—	—	—	—	Non-album singles
"Blaze to Glory"	2017	—	—	—	—	Non-album singles
"M.L.Y"	2019	—	—	—	—	Non-album singles
"Back for the Summer	2025					Non-album single
"—" denotes a recording that did not chart or was not released in that country.

== Videography ==
=== Music videos ===
List of music videos as lead artist and directors
Title	Year	Director(s)	Ref.
"Superstar"	2007	Kit Hui	
"24Herbs"	2007	Kit Hui, Phat Chan	
"To the Max" (x Pepsi)	2007	Unknown	
"Respect Tou Pok Guy"	2008	Unknown	
"激光中 (Lazer)"	2009	Unknown	
"Hu Ge"	2009	mo-c	
"Forgiveness" (Sammi Cheng)	2009	Unknown	
"Do You Know Me"	2010	Unknown	
"香港九龍 (Hong Kong Kowloon)"	2010	Wildog	
"Wonderland" (feat. Janice Vidal)	2011	Unknown	
"Big Man" (x 梁漢文)	2012	Unknown	
"Hot in the 852"	2013	Unknown	
"戰勝自己" (x Sammy)	2014	Unknown	
"Go Hard"	2017	Seanie Pictures	
"Blaze to Glory"	2017	Unknown	
"M.L.Y"	2019	OZMA	
