= Shinjuku Incident =

2009 Hong Kong film by Derek Yee

- Hong Kong film poster
- Directed by: Derek Yee
- Written by: Derek Yee; Chun Tin-nam
- Produced by: Willie Chan; Solon So
- Starring: Jackie Chan; Naoto Takenaka; Daniel Wu; Xu Jinglei; Fan Bingbing
- Cinematography: Kita Nobayasu
- Edited by: Kong Chi-leung; Cheung Ka-fai
- Music by: Peter Kam
- Production companies: Emperor Motion Pictures; JCE Entertainment
- Distributed by: JCE Movies Limited; Lark Films Distribution
- Release date: 2 April 2009
- Running time: 119 minutes
- Country: Hong Kong
- Languages: Mandarin; Japanese; Cantonese; English; Southern Min; Hokkien
- Budget: $15,000,000
- Box office: $5,461,200

Shinjuku Incident

Chinese name
- Traditional Chinese: 新宿事件
- Simplified Chinese: 新宿事件
Transcriptions
Standard Mandarin
- Hanyu Pinyin: Xīnsù Shìjiàn
Yue: Cantonese
- Jyutping: San^{1} Suk^{1} Si^{6} Gin^{2}

Japanese name
- Kanji: 新宿インシデント
- Kana: しんじゅくインシデント
- Hiragana: しんじゅくいんしでんと
- Katakana: シンジュクインシデント
Transcriptions
- Revised Hepburn: Shinjuku Inshidento
- Kunrei-shiki: Sinzyuku Insidento
- Nihon-shiki: Sinzyuku Insidento

Shinjuku Incident (Chinese: 新宿事件; pinyin: Xīnsù Shìjiàn; Jyutping: San1 Suk1 Si6 Gin2, Japanese: 新宿インシデント Shinjuku Inshidento) is a 2009 Hong Kong crime drama film directed by Derek Yee, and written by Yee and Chun Tin-nam. It stars Jackie Chan, Naoto Takenaka, Daniel Wu, Xu Jinglei, and Fan Bingbing. The film tells the story of Steelhead (Chan), a labour worker from China who travels to Japan as an illegal immigrant to look for his long-lost fiancée Xiu Xiu (Jinglei), only to be embroiled in the violent Japanese underworld.

The film was distributed by Chan's own film company, JCE Movies Limited. It was originally to be released on 25 September 2008 but was delayed to the first quarter of 2009. It premiered at the 2009 Hong Kong International Film Festival and was released on 2 April 2009. The film received generally positive reviews from critics.

== Plot ==
In the early 1990s, Nick, a tractor mechanic nicknamed Steelhead (Jackie Chan) illegally enters Japan from Hong Kong in search of his fiancée, Xiu-Xiu (Xu Jinglei) with the help of his "friend" Jie (Daniel Wu). Jie has taught Steelhead how to make a living by teaching him the trades of the underworld. One day, while illegally working as part of a clean-up crew in the sewers, Steelhead and his Chinese comrades are spotted by the police and run for their lives. In the ensuing turn of events, Steelhead saves Detective Kitano from drowning, and in gratitude, Kitano decides to stop pursuing Steelhead.

One night, while working in a restaurant with Jie, Steelhead finds Xiu-Xiu with yakuza leader Eguchi (Masaya Kato). Saddened by seeing his fiancée with another man, he spends the night with Jie drinking and partying with hookers. Once sober, Steelhead decides to become a legal citizen of Japan by any means possible. Steelhead and his Chinese friends begin a money laundering operation, but Jie is left out due to his kind-hearted nature. Unfortunately, Taiwanese triad leader Gao (Jack Kao) discovers one of his pachinko machines has been tampered with (fixed by Steelhead's group) and vows to punish the culprit. Jie gets caught playing with the tampered pachinko machine and is taken to a dark alleyway, where Gao slices Jie's face and cuts off his right hand while trying to get information. Upon learning that Jie is held by the Taiwanese gang, Steelhead and the rest of their group go and collect Jie.

Full of anger, Steelhead sneaks inside Gao's establishment and hides to take revenge, but instead learns of the plot between the Togawa group (rival "allies") and Gao to kill Eguchi. Eguchi, unaware of the plot, arrives at Gao's. Just as Gao is about to kill Eguchi, Steelhead saves him by chopping off Gao's arm with his machete. Steelhead and Eguchi manage to escape, and Steelhead is welcomed to the Eguchi estate to recover. There, Steelhead has the chance to catch up with Xiu-Xiu. Steelhead learns that Eguchi and Xiu-Xiu have a little girl, Ayako. Xiu-Xiu tells him that her name is now Yuko, and she is happy with her new life. In gratitude for saving his life, Eguchi returns and offers Steelhead a high-paying job in the yakuza, which he refuses.

Later, Eguchi tries unsuccessfully to expose Togawa for the attempted assassination, but their boss makes Eguchi apologize for the accusations instead. Eguchi then asks Steelhead to be a hitman. Steelhead agrees under two conditions: he will take control of Gao's territories and legally become a citizen of Japan. Steelhead kills all his targets, resulting in a gang war within the yakuza ranks. Eguchi is promoted after Togawa and Steelhead become a vassal under Eguchi with Gao's territories. Steelhead does everything to make a better life for his Chinese compatriots. Still, he has no interest in the daily operations of yakuza activity, leaving the daily operations to his brothers while he starts a successful tractor business.

In 2006, Detective Kitano meets Steelhead and warns him that his brothers have become corrupted and have been involved in the yakuza's drug trafficking. Kitano tells Steelhead that he will be arrested along with his friends and charged as the head conspirator. Steelhead makes a deal with Kitano: Steelhead would find evidence to have Eguchi detained in exchange for his comrades' freedom.

That fateful night, Steelhead and Kitano return to the vassal HQ to warn his comrades about their impending arrest if they do not stop their operations with Eguchi. His compatriots are reluctant to give up the rich lives they made with the yakuza. Refusing to stop their operation, Hongkie kills Old Ghost and attacks Steelhead. Meanwhile, the yakuza cannot tolerate Eguchi's leadership anymore. Gao, Nakajima (Eguchi's former subordinate), and Togawa's son agrees to take Eguchi down that night.

Waves of yakuza storm into the building and proceed to kill almost everyone, with only Eguchi, Steelhead, and Kitano surviving. Gao also died in Steelhead's retaliation. Mortally wounded by Nakajima, Eguchi gives Steelhead a flash drive that contains data on the yakuza operations in the last act of vengeance against the yakuza for turning on him. As Kitano and Steelhead escape, the police arrive and arrest the yakuza. After being split up from Kitano, Steelhead meets and bids a sorrowful farewell to a dying Jie, who had also escaped but did not survive the attack at the vassal HQ.

Steelhead calls Yuko to meet with Ayako at Okubo station, but Togawa has already taken Ayako hostage and forces Yuko to tell him where Steelhead is headed. Nakajima intercepts Steelhead; the police arrive in time and exchange gunfire with Nakajima and his men. Nakajima shoots Steelhead but is then gunned down by Kitano. Steelhead, still alive, flees into the sewers. Kitano follows, finds him swept away by the current, and tries to pull him out, but Steelhead tells him it is useless, and Kitano does not know how to swim. Steelhead gives the flash drive to Kitano before the current sweeps him away, calling his debt to Kitano repaid as he dies, while remembering how happy he was with his comrades in simpler times.

== Cast ==
- Jackie Chan as Steelhead/Nick
- Naoto Takenaka as Inspector Kitano
- Daniel Wu as Jie
- Xu Jinglei as Xiu Xiu/Yuko Eguchi
- Masaya Kato as Toshinari Eguchi
- Tōru Minegishi as Koichi Muranishi
- Jack Kao as Gao Jie (Taiwanese Gang Leader)
- Yasuaki Kurata as Taro Watagawa
- Lam Suet as Old Ghost
- Fan Bingbing as Lily
- Chin Ka-lok as Hongkie (Hong Kong Boy)
- Ken Lo as Little Tai
- Kenya Sawada as Hiro Nakajima
- Paul Chun as Uncle Tak
- Kathy Yuen Ka Yi as Shizuko
- Teddy Lin as Tai Bao (as Teddy Lin Chun)
- Hiro Hayama as Togawa Kyohei (as Hiro Hayama)
- Randy Muscles as Gaijin (uncredited)
- Wong Wai-fai
- Lesley Chiang
- Wu Gang
- Gladys Fung (as Gladys Fung Ho Sze)
- Michael J. Rice
- Ka Leong Chan (as Ringo Chan Ka-leong)
- Baudouin Euloge Adogony
- Chu Cho-Kuen
- Takumi Saito

== Production ==
According to director Derek Yee, the film has been in the planning stages for almost 10 years, and was due to start filming in May 2006. Because Chan was busy filming Rush Hour 3, filming for Shinjuku Incident was delayed. Yee didn't mind waiting until Chan's busy schedule had a slot, as the two are good friends and because Yee feels Chan is right for the role. On 26 September 2007, it stated on Chan's website that filming will begin in "a few weeks" in Japan. Filming began in November 2007.

However, due to significant amounts of violence in the film, director Yee made a conscious decision not to release the film in mainland China. China does not have a film classification system, so films are released for all audiences. Yee considered toning down or cutting the violence in order to pass censorship, but felt it would hurt the integrity of the film. Chan, who was an investor in the film, agreed with Yee's decision.

== Reception ==
On review aggregator website Rotten Tomatoes, the film has an approval rating of 60% based on 5 reviews.

Russell Edwards of Variety called the film "an over-ambitious, narratively untidy urban crimer", but added that it "defiantly establishes a new dramatic frontier for Chan, who's clearly the star and acquits himself admirably."

Brian Miller of The Village Voice wrote: "The killing and the brawling between rival Japanese and Chinese gang factions are spasmodic and unruly; there's no glamour to this mobster's rise and fall." He added that "Shinjuku Incident forgoes flashy action scenes in favor of old fashioned moralism. Warner Bros. could have made it in the 1930s, and that’s a compliment."

Edmund Lee of Time Out Hong Kong wrote: "Instead of glamorising the heroics of its characters, the film sympathises with the fact they are forced by circumstance into becoming criminals in the first place." He concluded that "Shinjuku Incident is pulsating in its dramatic intensity, and indelible in its brutal vision."

Perry Lam of Muse was unhappy with the more inclusive cast, complains that the film is an example of Hong Kong's supposed eroding cinematic identity: "OK, we get the point – mainlanders have always been the patriots, now they can be heroes in Cantonese cinema too… What will become of Hong Kong cinema, or what will be left of it, when its filmmakers stop trying to seek inspiration from the city and make heroes of its people?"

== Accolades ==
16th Hong Kong Film Critics Society Award

- Film of Merit
- Nominated: Best Director (Derek Yee)
- Nominated: Best Screenplay (Derek Yee, Chun Tin-nam)

29th Hong Kong Film Awards

- Nominated: Best Film (Willie Chan, Solon So)
- Nominated: Best Director (Derek Yee)
- Nominated: Best Cinematography (Nobuyasu Kita)
- Nominated: Best Action Choreography (Chin Ka Lok)

== Home media ==
On 22 February 2010, DVD was released by Cine Asia in a 2 disc ultimate edition at the UK in Region 2. In the United States, it was released on home media on 8 June 2010 By Sony Pictures Home Entertainment.

== See also ==
- Jackie Chan filmography
