= Shi Yanxu =

- Born: Henan, China
- Occupation(s): Teacher, Martial Artist, Public Speaker
- Known for: Founder Shaolin Temple Cultural Center, Kung Fu Heroes
- Style: Kenpo Karate, Shaolin Kung Fu, Wushu
- Title: 3rd degree black belt in Kenpo Karate, 34th Generation Disciple of Shaolin Temple

Shi Yanxu is the director of Shaolin Temple Cultural Center in Los Angeles. Yanxu started his monastic life in childhood with extensive Chan meditation and Shaolin Kung Fu training under Abbot Shi Yongxin at China’s Songshan Shaolin Temple. He was appointed the head instructor of Shaolin martial monks in 2004-2005 and has been the personal aid of the Abbot before he came to the United States. Shi Yanxu is a master of the Shaolin Arts---an integrated system of Chan Buddhism, Martial Arts and Medicine. He has gained insights to the scriptures and human nature through meditation guided by accomplished Chan masters. He specializes in various forms of Shaolin Martial Arts as well as the holistic exercise system which is designed to enhance people's physical health. The holistic exercise system follows Yijin Jing and Xi Sui Jing (Chinese: 洗髓經; lit. 'Marrow Washing Classic'), which were left behind by Bodhidharma at Songshan Shaolin Temple during 5th/6th century. Since 2007, Yanxu has taught hundreds of students with difference age, race, religion and cultural background. He has organized various events to promote Shaolin culture in the U.S., such as the Shaolin Temple Day Celebration. Also, Yanxu actively involved with the local community and his efforts were acknowledged by the City of Arcadia, City of Walnut, Los Angeles Country Sheriff's Department and Chinese Chamber of Commerce in Los Angeles County, etc.

== History ==
=== China's Kungfu Star Global Competition ===
On March 30, 2006, A new reality show called "China Kungfu Star Global Contest" K-Star was announced in China, a joint production by Shaolin Temple and Shenzhen Media Group. Its aim, to search for potential Kungfu stars globally to find a new spokesperson of Chinese Kungfu for new generations. As Peter Hsiao, a spokesperson for K-Star described it, "The Shaolin Temple has an open position on really taking their heritage, through the special form of this television platform, to communicate their message of the unity of movement and emotion. Their participation has really made it unique." The first season of K-STAR began in April 2006, garnering 300 million viewers and over 100,000 applicants from six Chinese cities and Five International venues. After more than half a year of televised eliminations, contestants took part of a closed door training session at the Shaolin Temple from September 1–9. During the time Shi Yanxu served as head of the Shaolin Warrior Monks and guided the 36 Global Finalists in their training while at the temple. On October 1, 2006, the world final was televised in a four-hour live broadcast judged by action star and former Beijing Wushu Team Member Jacky Wu Jing (Sha Po Lang, Tai Chi Master, Legend of Zu) Director Stanley Tong (The Myth, Martial Law, Mr. Magoo) and Director Wang Xiaoshuai (Frozen). First place went to China's Gu Shangwei, Second Philip Sahagun and third to China's Xue Jiangtao. K-Star's fifteen million yuan investment yielded a twenty million yuan return (or about $793,000 USD profit). Additionally Shaolin Shenzhen Radio allegedly donated 100 Million yuan to the Buddhism Research Fund.

=== Shaolin Temple Cultural Center ===
In September 2007 Shaolin Temple Cultural Center USA was established by Shi Yanxu under the official directive of the Songshan Shaolin Temple in China in hopes to protect and promote its 1,500 years of orthodox Chan (meditation), Wu (martial arts) and Yi (herbal healing) practice in the U.S. Shaolin Temple Cultural Center USA wishes to advance cultural exchange and organically enhance people's physical, mental and spiritual wellness through the practice of Shaolin's unique synthesis of Chan, Wu and Yi—a Holistic Healthy Lifestyle that nourishes the mind and spirit with meditation, strengthens the body with martial arts training and sustains physical wellness through traditional medicine.
