= East Wing West Wing TV =

East Wing West Wing TV (simplified Chinese: 东宫西宫TV; traditional Chinese: 東宮西宮TV) is a political comedy show produced by Asia Television of Hong Kong through high-definition technology. It premiered on June 26, 2011 on ATV Home and ATV Asia. The show is based on a stage drama of the same name. Mathias Woo serves as the show's producer, director and screenwriter.

== Broadcast ==
The following time to local time:

Channel	Country / Region	Play Date and Time	Of local time zone
ATV Home	Hong Kong	June 26, 2011	UTC+8
ATV Asia	Hong Kong	June 26, 2011	UTC+8

== Related ==
- Mathias Woo
- Zuni Icosahedron
- Asia Television

== Link ==
- Zuni Icosahedron
- Asian television
- ATV East Palace West Palace website
- Editing East Wing West Wing facebook
