= Run Papa Run =

2008 Hong Kong film by Sylvia Chang

- Film poster
- Traditional Chinese: 一個好爸爸
- Simplified Chinese: 一个好爸爸
- Hanyu Pinyin: Yi Gè Hǎo Bà Bà
- Jyutping: Jat1 Go3 Hou2 Baa4 Baa1
- Directed by: Sylvia Chang
- Screenplay by: Susan Chan; Sylvia Chang; Mathias Woo
- Based on: Run Papa Run by Benny Li
- Produced by: Willie Chan; Patricia Cheng; Solon So
- Starring: Louis Koo
- Cinematography: Chan Chi-ying
- Edited by: Kong Chi-leung
- Music by: Wong Wan-ling; Baby Chung
- Production companies: JCE Movies Limited; Red on Red
- Distributed by: Emperor Motion Pictures
- Release date: 10 April 2008
- Running time: 115 minutes
- Country: Hong Kong
- Languages: Cantonese; Mandarin

Run Papa Run is a 2008 Hong Kong crime comedy-drama film directed by Sylvia Chang, who also wrote with Susan Chan and Mathias Woo. The film is based on a novel of the same name by Benny Li. The film stars Louis Koo, Rene Liu, and Nora Miao in her first Hong Kong theatrically released film since 1996. Koo played Tiger Lee, a Triad boss who struggles to hide his criminal lifestyle when he is faced with raising his daughter.

== Cast ==
- Louis Koo as Tiger Lee Tin-yun
  - Chan Ka-wo as Young Tiger Lee
- Rene Liu as Mabel Chan
- Nora Miao as Auntie Ying
- Liu Yihan as Lee Hei-yee
  - Monica Lam as 1 year-old Lee Hoi-yee
  - Wong Wai-lam as 5 year-old Lee Hoi-yee
  - Wong Wai-ching as 10 year-old Lee Hoi-yee
- Max Mok as Big Eyes
- Lam Suet as Big Mouth
- Derek Tsang as Chicken
- Conroy Chan as Big Head
- Guo Jingling as Officer Lau
- Ti Lung as Mabel's father
- Amy To as Mabel's mother
- Shaun Tam as Ken/Peter Lau
  - Au Wai-lun as Young Peter Lau
- Michael Chan as Uncle Tak
- Kent Cheng as Uncle Lone
- Siu Yam-yam as Madam Si
- Gladys Fung as Sue
- Louis Wong as Uncle Kwai
- Fruit Chan as Priest
- Lau Shau-ching as Priest
- Ken Lo as Kong
- Lam Wah-chuen as Mr. Doun
- Wong Pak-to as Four Eyes in Hair Salon
- Cheung Ping-chuen as 70s gangster
- Tsang Chin-yau as 70s gangster
- Heung Ming-hiu as 70s gangster
- Sammy Sum as Tiger's bodyguard
- Altan Au as Tiger's bodyguard
- Fong Chi-kui as Big head's bodyguard
- Wong Chi-wang as Big Head's bodyguard
- Martin Ma as Big Head's bodyguard
- Jason Yip as Cram school instructor #1
- Michelle Wong as Cram school instructor #1
- Law Chi-leung as Cram school instructor #1
- Chan Wai-kwong as Doctor
- Eddy Law as Plainclothes detective #1
- Law Yun-yau as Plainclothes detective #2
- Victy Wong as Tiger's syndicate colleague
- Rocky Wong as Tiger's syndicate colleague
- Alan Jim as Tiger's syndicate colleague
- Mo Chun-yu as Big Head's son
- Cheung Ka-yan as Shirley Lau
- Choemanree Kraisorn as Thai drug trafficker
- Ng Pok-yee as Thai drug trafficker
- Ivy Lau as Kindergarten teacher
- Chan Sze-wai as Kindergarten student
- Lau Pik-ka as Kindergarten student
- Huang Kai-sen as Boss of rival gang
- Coco Cheung as Big Mouth's female escort
- Ng Hau-yiu as Big Head's female escort
- Cheung Siu-lun as Boy in hospital
- Brian R. Barrons as Priest
- Chan Sze-kit as Church organist

== Awards and nominations ==
Awards and nominations
Ceremony	Category	Recipient	Outcome
28th Hong Kong Film Awards	Best Actor	Louis Koo	Nominated
28th Hong Kong Film Awards	Best Supporting Actress	Nora Miao	Nominated
28th Hong Kong Film Awards	Best Screenplay	Susan Chan, Sylvia Chang, Mathias Woo	Nominated
49th Golden Horse Awards	Best Director	Sylvia Chang	Nominated
49th Golden Horse Awards	Best Actor	Louis Koo	Nominated
49th Golden Horse Awards	Best Supporting Actress	Nora Miao	Nominated
15th Hong Kong Film Critics Society Awards	Best Actress	Nora Miao	Nominated
15th Hong Kong Film Critics Society Awards	Best Screenplay	Susan Chan, Sylvia Chang, Mathias Woo	Nominated
15th Hong Kong Film Critics Society Awards	Film of Merit	Run Papa Run	Won
9th Chinese Film Media Awards	Best Supporting Actress	Nora Miao	Nominated
8th Ming Pao Performing Arts Awards	Most Outstanding Actress	Rene Liu	Nominated
