= Philip Sahagun =

American martial artist

- Born: Costa Mesa, California United States
- Occupations: Teacher, Martial Artist, Public Speaker
- Known for: Founder Kung Fu Heroes, Head Teacher South Coast Martial Arts
- Style: Kenpo Karate, Shaolin Kung Fu, Wushu
- Title: 3rd degree black belt in Kenpo Karate, 34th Generation Disciple of Shaolin Temple
- Parents: Joaquin Sahagun (father); Gina Sahagun (mother)
- Sports career
- Sport: Wushu
Medal record
Men's Wushu Taolu
Representing United States
World Traditional Championships
Gold medal – first place	2006 Zhengzhou	Danbian
Silver medal – second place	2008 Shiyan	Shaolinquan
Silver medal – second place	2008 Shiyan	Danbian
Bronze medal – third place	2006 Zhengzhou	Wuxingquan

Philip Sahagun is a martial arts champion in both forms and fighting. With a background in American Kenpo, Kickboxing, Wushu and Shaolin Kung Fu, Philip is a 7-time National Weapons Champion and a 3-Time International Martial Arts Council Grand Champion. Philip has been a semi-finalist on America's Got Talent, as well as a contestant on two of China's top-rated reality competitions, Kung Fu Star and Jackie Chan's Disciple. In 2008 & 2009 He toured as a martial arts ‘Ninja’ performer for Tina Turner's 50th Anniversary World Tour. He has taught martial arts extensively and represented America twice at the World Traditional Wushu Festival in China where he won both gold and silver medals for the U.S. Team. In 2010 he founded the group "Kung Fu Heroes" an international martial arts team whose mission is to unite individuals seeking to become "Heroes" and positive role models in local and worldwide communities in December 2014, Philip Sahagun moved to Las Vegas to begin a new artistic journey under the guidance of Cirque Du Soleil's artistic directors Ria Martins and Pierre Parisien which eventually led to the creation of multiple martial arts inspired sequences for Zumanity.

== History ==
=== China's Kungfu Star Global Competition ===
On March 30, 2006, A new reality show called "China Kungfu Star Global Contest" K-Star was announced in China, a joint production by Shaolin Temple and Shenzhen Media Group. Its aim, to search for potential Kungfu stars globally to find a new spokesperson of Chinese Kungfu for new generations. As Peter Hsiao, a spokesperson for K-Star described it, "The Shaolin Temple has an open position on really taking their heritage, through the special form of this television platform, to communicate their message of the unity of movement and emotion. Their participation has really made it unique." The first season of K-STAR or 功夫之星 began in April 2006, garnering 300 million viewers and over 100,000 applicants from six Chinese cities and Five International venues. After more than half a year of televised eliminations, contestants took part of a closed door training session at the Shaolin Temple from September 1–9. On October 1, 2006, eighteen competitors took part of the world final which was televised in a four-hour live broadcast judged by action star and former Beijing Wushu Team Member Jacky Wu Jing (Sha Po Lang, Tai Chi Master, Legend of Zu) Director Stanley Tong (The Myth, Martial Law, Mr. Magoo) and Director Wang Xiaoshuai (Frozen). First place went to China's Gu Shangwei, Second Philip Sahagun and third to China's Xue Jiangtao. K-Star's fifteen million yuan investment yielded a twenty million yuan return (or about US$793,000 profit). Additionally Shaolin Shenzhen Radio allegedly donated 100 Million yuan to the Buddhism Research Fund.

=== Jackie Chan's Disciple ===
In April 2007 Jackie Chan announced over his birthday that he was beginning a new reality TV Show series entitled The Disciple (simplified Chinese: 龙的传人: lit. "Descendants of the Dragon"). The aim of the program was to find a new star, skilled in acting and martial arts, to become Chan's "successor" and student in filmmaking. After sorting through a number of candidates from throughout the world, the contestants arrived in Beijing October 2007 to begin filming and face eliminations. As the only "Caucasian" allowed in the competition, Philip Sahagun faced many challenges, such as acting and memorizing scenes in a foreign language. After four rounds of intense evaluations Philip received an award for standout performance and made it to the top 20 before facing elimination. The finalist received training by Jackie Chan Stunt Team members Alan Wu and He Jun and competed in various fields, including explosion scenes, high-altitude wire-suspension, gunplay, car stunts, diving, obstacles courses etc. The regular judges on the program were He Ping, Wu Yue and Cheng Pei-pei. Guest judges included Stanley Tong, Sammo Hung and Yuen Biao. The "Finals" began on April 5, 2008, with 16 contestants remaining, and concluded on June 26, 2008.

=== Tina Turner's: 50th Anniversary Live Tour ===
In October 2008, Veteran Singer Tina Turner opened her record-breaking Tina!: 50th Anniversary Tour featuring a state of the art stage, ten-man band, backup singers, four female dancers and an all-male group of martial artists: Philip Sahagun, Justice Smith, Xin Wuku and Danny Sre. The Queen of Rock and Roll's Tour performed 80 shows in over 40 cities throughout North America and Europe. The North American leg of the tour played 37 sold out performances, earning over $40 million—becoming one of the biggest tours in the territory for 2008. While in Europe, the Tour grossed an additional $80 million and became the 9th highest earning tour in 2009 with 47 sold out performances. The tour was seen by over one million spectators and grossed over $100 million. The concerts received additional accolades, receiving an Excellence Award from Live Design Magazine.

=== America's Got Talent: Season 5 ===
In 2010, Philip Sahagun debuted his team "Kung Fu Heroes" on America's Got Talent Season 5 on NBC. The show premiered on Tuesday, June 1 at 8 pm ET and after making past three rounds of competition, The "Kung Fu Heroes" made it to the quarter finals before facing elimination.

=== Cirque Du Soleil: Zumanity ===
In December 2014, Philip Sahagun moved to Las Vegas to begin a new artistic journey under the guidance of Cirque Du Soleil's artistic directors Ria Martins and Pierre Parisien which eventually led to the creation of multiple martial arts inspired sequences for Zumanity. On Thursday Feb 26th, 2015 the new look for a "refreshed" Zumanity was revealed, which included new dancers, aerialists, musicians and a previously unseen addition, martial arts. Following a nearly three-year run as a performer in the show, Philip became an artist coach and martial arts consultant for the famed Montreal based Company.

== Martial arts achievement ==
- 2013 Head judge and translator for The First Shaolin Temple Cultural Festival in LA
- 2013 Performed at Bercy Stadium for the "Festival of Martial Arts" in Paris, France
- 2012 Third Degree Black Belt in American Kenpo Karate
- 2012 35th Generation Disciple of Shaolin Temple Master Shi Yan Xu
- 2011 Taught Martial Arts abroad in seven different countries
- 2010 Created the DVD Series Wushu Jumps and Falls with TC Media
- 2010 Founder of the Internationally known Kungfu Heroes Martial Arts Team
- 2008 Silver Medalist, World Traditional Wushu Festival, Shiyan, China
- 2007 Dragon Award, "Descendants of the Dragon" Beijing, China
- 2007 Represented the US in Jackie Chan's "The Disciple" Beijing, China
- 2006 & 2008 US Team Member Traditional Wushu Team
- 2006 Success Award, "Wanna Challenge Show" Beijing, China
- 2006 Gold Medalist, World Traditional Wushu Festival, Zhengzhou, China
- 2006 Martial Arts Hero Award, Kungfu Star Competition, Shenzhen, China
- 2006 Runner Up, Global Kungfu Star Competition, Shenzhen, China
- 2005 Top 3 American K-Star Competition, Los Angeles
- 3-Time International Level Grand Champion
- 7-Time National Level Traditional Weapons Champion
