= Edward Lam =

- Born: 17 March 1959 (age 67); British Hong Kong
- Other name: Edward Lam Yik-wah
- Citizenship: Hong Kong
- Occupations: Director; screenwriter; writer

Chinese name
- Traditional Chinese: 林奕華
Transcriptions
Yue: Cantonese
- Jyutping: lam4 jik6 waa4
- Musical career

Edward Lam (traditional Chinese: 林奕華; born 17 March 1959) is a Hong Kong theatre director, writer, essayist and television presenter.

== Career ==
Edward Lam was born in Hong Kong, and his family comes from Zhongshan, Guangdong. He began writing at the age of 14 and joined Hong Kong television network TVB as a screenwriter in late 1970s. During this period, he also worked as a radio presenter for cultural programs at RTHK. In 1982, he helped found the experimental theatre company Zuni Icosahedron, where he worked on dozens of productions.

Lam lived in London from 1989 to 1995. In 1990, with support from the British Council, he worked at the Palace Theatre in London. During his time in Britain, he founded Edward Lam Dance Theatre (非常林奕華舞蹈劇場) and presented productions in London, Brussels, Paris and Hong Kong. His works were also performed in other European cities from 1991. By the time he returned to Hong Kong in 1995, he had created more than 80 theatre productions.

In 1994, Lam won the Golden Horse Award for Best Adapted Screenplay for Red Rose White Rose, directed by Stanley Kwan. After returning to Hong Kong in 1995, he continued writing and directing plays. He worked on more than 40 productions and worked with artists and organizations from different cities and fields. He also continued to run Edward Lam Dance Theatre. In 1995 and 1999, he received the Artist of the Year Award (香港藝術家獎). In 2005, he received a commendation under the Secretary for Home Affairs’ Commendation Scheme (民政事務局局長嘉許獎).

Since 1997, Lam has taught courses at the University of Hong Kong, Hong Kong Baptist University and the Hong Kong Academy for Performing Arts. He has also written articles for newspapers and magazines in Hong Kong, Beijing and Guangzhou.

Lam is openly gay. In 1989, he founded the Hong Kong Lesbian & Gay Film Festival at the Hong Kong Arts Centre and served as its director for nine years.

== Works ==
=== Television screenwriting ===
- 世界名劇選: 彌 (1976, TVB)
- 職業女性: 女演員 (1977, RTV)
- 職業女性: 女教師 (1977, RTV)
- 職業女性: 模特兒 (1977, RTV)
- 愛情故事 (1977, RTV)
- 追族 (1978, RTV)
- 強人 (1978, TVB)
- 甜姐兒 (1978, TVB)
- 孖生姊妹 (1978, TVB)
- 執到寶 (1980, TVB)
- 神女有心 (1982, TVB)

=== Stage plays ===
- 教我如何愛四個不愛我的男人 (1989, 1990)
- 男更衣室的四種風景 (1991, 1994)
- 我所知道的悲慘世界 - 為甚麼男人不相信眼淚 (1993)
- 我要活下去之八十日環遊悲慘世界 (1995)
- 男裝帝女花 (1995, 1996)
- 斷章記 - 訪他媽的問 (1995)
- 鹹濕使徒行傳 (1996)
- 中國旅程 (1997, 1998)
- 幸運曲奇之三國演義 (1997)
- 兒女英雄傳 (1997, 1999)
- 愛的教育 (1997, 1998)
- 行雷閃電 (1999)
- 我X學校 (Ideal School) (2000)
- 張愛玲, 請留言 (2002)
- 十八相送 - 十八個與愛人分手的故事 (2002)
- 快樂王子 (2003)
- "East Wing West Wing" series (in collaboration with Mathias Woo)
- 半生緣 (2004)
- 行雷閃電 (2004)
- Sad Movie (2005)
- 情場如商場 - 班雅明做愛計劃 (2005)
- 萬世歌王 (2006)
- 包法利夫人們 (2006)
- 包法利夫人們: 名媛的美麗與哀愁 (2007) (produced in collaboration with Taiwan's Eslite Bookstore)
- 水滸傳 - What Is Man? (2006, produced in collaboration with Taiwan's National Theater and Concert Hall; 四大名著經典系列-1)
- 西遊記 - What Is Fantasy? (2007, produced in collaboration with Taiwan's National Theater and Concert Hall; 四大名著經典系列-2)
- 萬千師奶賀台慶 (2007)
- 華麗上班族之生活與生存 (2008)
- 男人與女人之戰爭與和平 (2009)
- 命運建築師之遠大前程 (2010)
- 紅娘的異想世界之在西廂 (2011)
- 賈寶玉 (2011)
- 三國 - WHAT IS SUCCESS? (2012, produced in collaboration with Taiwan's National Theater and Concert Hall in Taipei from 28 to 31 December 2012; 四大名著經典系列-3)
- 兩男關係 (2012)
- 恨嫁家族 (2014–2015)
- 梁祝的繼承者們 (2014–2015)
- 紅樓夢 - What Is Sex? (2014–2015, produced in collaboration with Taiwan's National Theater and Concert Hall; 四大名著經典系列-4)
- 心之侦探 - 有一种关系叫华生与福尔摩斯 (2016)
- 机场无真爱 (2017)
- 聊斋 - Why We Chat? (2017–2018)
- 時老師自修室 (2019)
- 深夜書店之一千零一夜 (2020)
- 一個人邀請: 人約吉場後 (2020)
- 一個人的一一 (2021)
- 寶玉, 你好 (2021)
- #女與兒 (2022)
- 兩個人的一一之14首搖籃曲 (2022)
- 三個人的一一: NJ的熱海旅行 (2023)
- 艱辛歲月 (2023)
- A.I.時代與梁祝的繼承者們 (2024)
- 我在那時錯過了你 (2025)
- 有一天, 我和祝英台去美術館 (2025)

=== Television hosting ===
- 我愛你愛電視劇 (2006, RTHK Radio 2 & 5)

==== Former programs ====
- 拖男帶女 Love Actually 之 非常林奕華部分 (RTHK Radio 2)
- 文字影院II (10 April - 3 July 2005, TeenPower, co-hosted with Zita Law)

=== Publications ===
==== Published by 陳米記 ====
- 27.01.97–30.09.97 (1997)
- a/s/l age/sex/location (1999)
- 林奕華的戲劇世界 (26 January 2000)
- Edward Lam on Love (2002)
- Edward Lam on Cinema (2002)

==== 等待香港 (2005) ====
- 青春篇
- 文化篇
- 女人篇
- 娛樂篇

==== 娛樂大家 (2008) ====
- 電影篇
- 電視篇
- 明星篇
- 文化篇

==== 惡之華麗 (2011) ====
- 文化人何苦難為文化人
- 惱人電影
- 我的情敵是社會
- 明星不再住在這裏

==== Independently published ====
- 是《輪流傳》不是《輪流轉》：香港電視劇的流水落花春去也 (2013)
- 是銀幕不是熒幕，是放映不是播映：當女明星還是大女明星 (2014)
