= JCE Movies Limited =

- Company type: Public company
- Industry: Film production
- Founded: 2004
- Founder: Jackie Chan; Albert Yeung
- Headquarters: Wan Chai, Hong Kong
- Key people: Willie Chan; Solon So
- Products: movies
- Website: http://www.jce.com.hk

JCE Movies Limited
- Traditional Chinese: 成龍英皇影業有限公司
- Simplified Chinese: 成龙英皇影业有限公司
Transcriptions
Standard Mandarin
- Hanyu Pinyin: Chéng Lóng Yīnghuáng Yǐngyè Yǒuxiàn Gōngsī
Yue: Cantonese
- Jyutping: Sing4 Lung4 Jing1 Wong4 Jing2 Jip6 Jau2 Haan6 Gung1 Si1

JCE Movies Limited (Chinese: 成龍英皇影業有限公司) is a film distribution and production company based in Wan Chai, Hong Kong. It was founded in 2004 and is a division of Emperor Motion Picture Group, which is part of the Emperor Entertainment Group (EEG).

The company was formed by the actor and film director Jackie Chan and the principal of EMG, Albert Yeung. The company's full title is Jackie Chan Emperor Movies Limited. It is sometimes also listed as JCE Entertainment Ltd.

From its inception, JCE was intended to be the studio to produce and distribute all of Jackie Chan's domestic films, and to date has released New Police Story (2004), The Myth (2005) and Rob-B-Hood (2006). JCE will also release other East Asian films, particularly Hong Kong films.

== Origins ==
Chan began his film career starring in films for director and producer Lo Wei in 1976. Lo's films were released by the Lo Wei Motion Picture Company, a subsidiary of Golden Harvest. After limited success, Chan was loaned out to Seasonal Films in 1978 for a 2-picture deal. Working with director Yuen Woo-ping and producer Ng See-Yuen, Chan made had his first real successes in the industry, with Snake in the Eagle's Shadow and Drunken Master.

Chan made a couple of further films for Lo Wei, but together they were unable to replicate the success of Chan's Seasonal Films releases. When film producer and friend to Jackie, Willie Chan left the company in 1979, Jackie followed, breaking his contract with Lo Wei to join Golden Harvest.

Jackie Chan remained with Golden Harvest studios for almost 20 years, releasing all of his Hong Kong films through the studio, beginning with The Young Master in 1980 and ending with Who Am I? in 1998.

His next two Hong Kong films, Gorgeous and The Accidental Spy were produced elsewhere, though were still distributed by Golden Harvest in Hong Kong.

In 2003, Chan made a guest appearance in The Twins Effect, a film produced and distributed by EMG. His next film, The Medallion, was also made in association with the company.

In 2004, he teamed up with EMG's Albert Yeung to start his own film company, JCE Movies Limited, for which Chan is chairman. To date, JCE Movies Limited has released 10 films, 5 of which are Chan's own. Chan's 2009 film, Shinjuku Incident was also produced by the company, as was several of Chan's subsequent films.

== Releases ==
- Enter the Phoenix (2004)
- New Police Story (2004)
- House of Fury (2005)
- The Myth (2005)
- Rice Rhapsody (2005)
- Everlasting Regret a.k.a. Song of Everlasting Regrets (2005)
- Rob-B-Hood (2006)
- Run Papa Run (2008)
- Shinjuku Incident (2009)
- Little Big Soldier (2010)
- 1911 (2011)
- CZ12 (2012)
- The company also distributed the Sega video game, Shenmue Online in Hong Kong.
