= Hong Kong Lesbian & Gay Film Festival =

LGBTQ film festival in China

Hong Kong Lesbian & Gay Film Festival (HKLGFF)
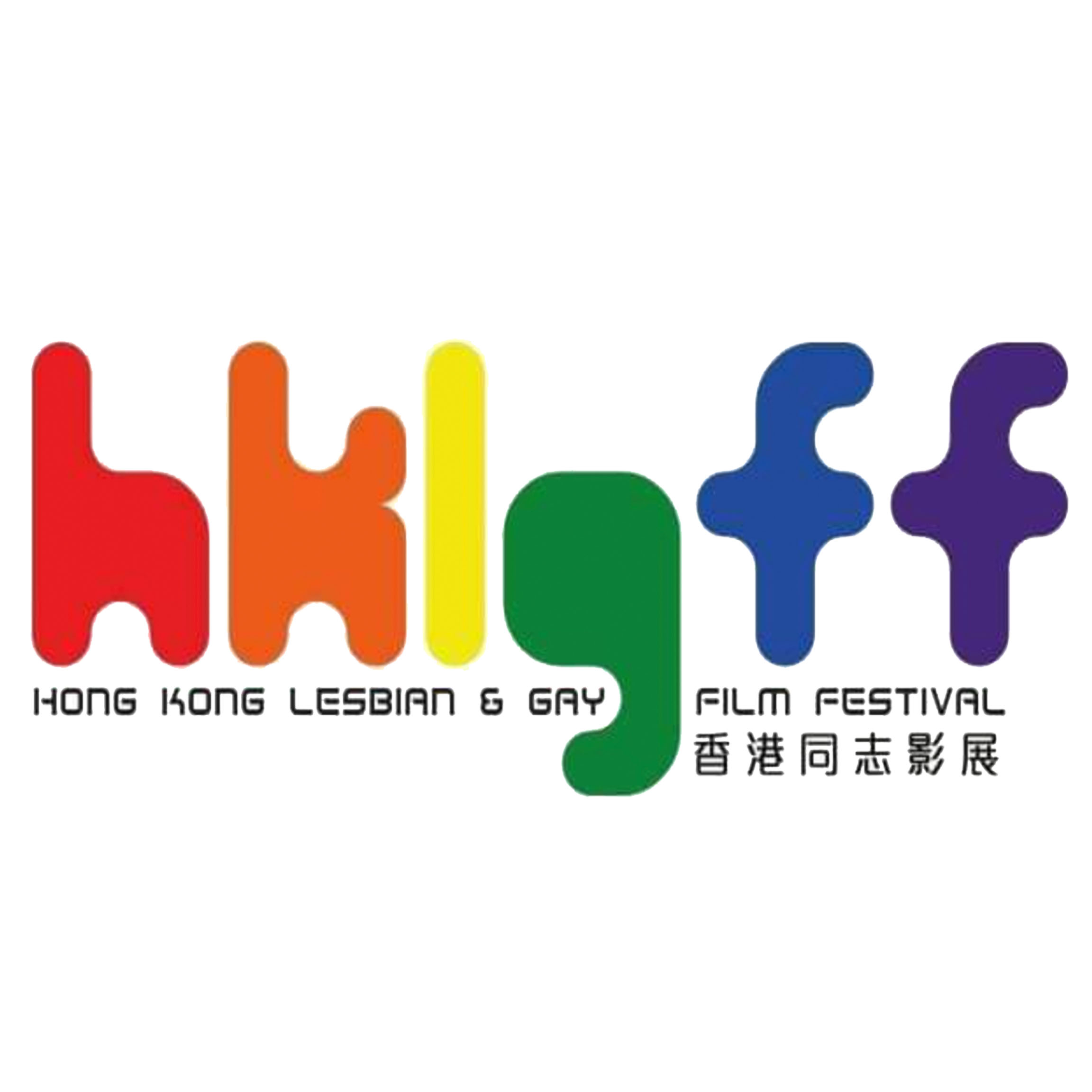
- Location: Hong Kong
- Founded: 1989
- Directors: Ray Yeung (2000—); Joe Lam (2009—2024); Vicci Ho (2006—2008); Denise Tang (2004—2005); Karl Uhrich (2004); Wouter Barendrecht (2000—2003); Edward Lam (1989—1999)
- Hosted by: Hong Kong Lesbian & Gay Film Festival Society (2001—); Wouter Barendrecht and Ray Yeung (2000—2001); Hong Kong Arts Centre (1989—1999)
- Festival date: September, annually
- Language: International
- Website: Official website

Hong Kong Lesbian & Gay Film Festival
- Chinese: 香港同志影展
Transcriptions
Standard Mandarin
- Hanyu Pinyin: Xiānggǎng Tóngzhì Yǐngzhǎn
Yue: Cantonese
- Yale Romanization: Hēung góng túhng ji ying jín
- Jyutping: Hoeng^{1} gong^{2} tung^{4} zi^{3} jing^{2} zin^{2}

The Hong Kong Lesbian & Gay Film Festival (HKLGFF; Chinese: 香港同志影展) is a dynamic annual international celebration of LGBTQIA+ cinema, held each September in Hong Kong. Founded in 1989 by Edward Lam, a Hong Kong film director and gay activist, it is considered to be the oldest LGBT film festival in Asia.

== Background ==
The Hong Kong Lesbian & Gay Film Festival seeks to present rare contemporary and historical films on a wide range of LGBT topics from Hong Kong and across the world. Its activities are directed by the Hong Kong Lesbian and Gay Film Festival Society, a non-profit organisation set up by Wouter Barendrecht and Ray Yeung in 2001, which states that it "seeks to promote equal opportunities and eliminate discrimination against sexual minority groups in Hong Kong through cinematic works of art".

The Festival is screened annually each September and is known as the Hong Kong Tongzhi Film Festival in Chinese. The word tongzhi (Chinese: 同志; pinyin: tóngzhì), which translates into English as 'comrade' or 'same will', was chosen by the festival's founder Edward Lam and is a popular term for members of LGBT communities used in the Chinese-speaking world.

== History ==
Hong Kong Lesbian & Gay Film Festival was founded by Edward Lam in 1989. It was initially sponsored by the Hong Kong Arts Centre and screened there exclusively until 1999. However, due to low ticket sales and funding issues following the 1997 Asian financial crisis, the festival was suspended, with Lam stepping away from his role as festival director.

In 2000, Wouter Barendrecht and Ray Yeung (楊曜愷) renewed the film festival, establishing the Hong Kong Lesbian & Gay Film Festival Society as a non-profit organization the following year. Today, the festival operates independently from the Hong Kong Arts Centre and has hosted its screenings at various commercial cinemas throughout the city since 2003.

== Programming and events ==
Throughout the festival period, the organization offers a dynamic lineup of activities designed to engage audiences, honor cinematic achievements, and spark meaningful conversations. These include:

- Film screenings – Showcasing an array of compelling films by talented creators from around the globe.
- Post-screening Q&A sessions – Providing audiences with opportunities to engage directly with filmmakers and gain deeper insight into their work.
- Opening and closing ceremonies and parties – Celebrating the art of cinema and the spirit of community through vibrant gatherings that bring together guests, filmmakers, and partners.
- Panel discussions – Facilitating thoughtful and engaging conversations with acclaimed filmmakers, industry professionals, and creative voices.

== Awards and recognition ==
- PRISM Award – Honoring individuals or organizations whose exceptional contributions have advanced and strengthened the LGBTQ+ community.
- Short Screenplay Competition – Supporting and empowering emerging Chinese language screenwriters by offering a platform to showcase their talent and creativity.
- Short Film Jury Award – Recognizing excellence in short filmmaking as determined by a panel of industry experts.

== Previous Screening Venues ==
- AMC Cinema, Festival Walk, Kowloon Tong
- Broadway Cinematheque, 3 Public Square Street, Yau Ma Tei
- IFC Palace, IFC Mall, 8 Broadway, Central
- Kee Club – 6/F, 32 Wellington Street, Central
- Premiere Cinema – ELEMENTS, 1 Austin Road West, Kowloon
- University of Hong Kong, Mid-Levels, Central
- Zafran – Basement, 43–55 Wyndham Street, Central

== See also ==
- List of LGBT film festivals
