= The Myth (film) =

2005 Hong Kong-Chinese film by Stanley Tong

- Film poster

Chinese name
- Traditional Chinese: 神話
- Simplified Chinese: 神话
Transcriptions
Standard Mandarin
- Hanyu Pinyin: Shénhuà
Yue: Cantonese
- Jyutping: San4-waa2
- Directed by: Stanley Tong
- Written by: Stanley Tong; Li Haishu; Wang Hui-ling
- Produced by: Jackie Chan; Solon So; Barbie Tung; Willie Chan; Yang Buting; Albert Yeung
- Starring: Jackie Chan; Tony Leung Ka-fai; Kim Hee-sun; Mallika Sherawat
- Cinematography: Horace Wong; Ng Man-Ching; Michael Johnson; Lai Yiu-Fai; Choi Shung-Fai
- Edited by: Yau Chi-Wai
- Music by: Gary Chase; Nathan Wang
- Production company: JCE Movies Limited
- Distributed by: Emperor Motion Pictures
- Release date: 11 May 2005
- Running time: 118 minutes
- Country: Hong Kong
- Languages: Cantonese; Mandarin Chinese; Korean; English; Tamil; Malayalam
- Budget: US$15 million

The Myth (神話; 神话) is a 2005 martial arts fantasy film directed by Stanley Tong, who also wrote the film alongside Li Haishu and Wang Hui-ling, and produced by Jackie Chan. A Hong Kong-Chinese co-production, the film stars Chan with a supporting cast of Tony Leung Ka-fai, Kim Hee-sun, and Mallika Sherawat.

The Myth is followed by one sequel A Legend (2024).

== Plot ==
During the Qin dynasty, the general Meng Yi is tasked with escorting the Korean princess Ok-Soo back to China to be the Qin emperor's concubine. Along the way, Meng Yi is injured while protecting Ok-Soo and they develop romantic feelings for each other but ultimately stay true to their respective duties. When the Qin emperor becomes critically ill, he sends Meng Yi to find the elixir of life, the only thing that can save his life. Before leaving, Meng Yi confesses his love for Ok-Soo and she vows to await his return. After being ambushed while retrieving the elixir, Meng Yi passes it to his deputy, Nangong Yan, before succumbing to his wounds. Although Nangong Yan delivers the elixir to the emperor, the prince and the chancellor force Nangong Yan and Ok-Soo to test the elixir's authenticity by consuming it. They become immortal but are condemned to imprisonment in the Qin emperor's mausoleum for eternity.

In the present-day, Meng Yi has been reincarnated as Jack, an archaeologist, and he often dreams of his past life. Along with his friend William, he travels to the floating tomb of a Dasar prince in India to find a rare material that can create a zero-gravity field. After William accidentally causes the zero-gravity field to collapse, Jack falls into the river while they are fleeing the disintegrating tomb. Jack is saved by Samantha, who brings him to meet her uncle, a Kalaripayattu guru. While duelling with one of the guru's students, Jack has a vision of Meng Yi duelling the Dasar prince and gains insight into his past life. He and William manage to return home safely and donate the sword to the National Museum of China. Their actions anger Professor Koo, the leader of the syndicate that has been funding their treasure hunt.

After extensive research, Jack and William conclude that the material creating the zero-gravity field is a fragment of a meteorite that fell to Earth during the Qin dynasty. They find the location of the Qin emperor's mausoleum, which is concealed behind a waterfall. The massive tomb contains the strongest fragment of the meteorite and it is powerful enough to turn the tomb into a floating palace. Jack meets Ok-Soo and Nangong Yan in the tomb, and they mistake him for Meng Yi. Professor Koo and his men enter and attempt to seize the elixir, leading to an aerial fight between both sides. William accidentally breaks the balance of the field after removing a piece of the meteorite and causes the tomb to collapse on itself, and dies from drowning in mercury. While Jack is escaping the collapsing tomb, he asks Ok-soo to come with him, but she refuses after realising he is not Meng Yi. As Koo approaches the elixir, Nangong Yan grabs him and they fall to their deaths.

Jack is then seen at home with a published copy of The Myth, a book he wrote about his adventures which he dedicates to William.

== Cast ==
- Jackie Chan as Meng Yi / Jack
- Kim Hee-sun as Ok-Soo
- Tony Leung Ka-fai as William
- Mallika Sherawat as Samantha
- Choi Min-soo as General Choi
- Shao Bing as Nangong Yan
- Patrick Tam as Xu Gui
- Ken Lo as Dragon
- Yu Rongguang as Zhao Kuang
- Hayama Go as Tiger
- Maggie Lau as Maggie
- Ram Gopal Bajaj as Samantha's uncle
- Sudhanshu Pandey as the tomb guard captain
- Jon Foo (extra) (uncredited)

== Release ==
=== Box office ===
The Myth was released in Hong Kong on 23 September 2005, and earned a strong HK$6,230,000 in its first three days. It ended its run with HK$17 million, making it the third highest-grossing domestic release in Hong Kong that year.

=== Critical response ===
On Rotten Tomatoes, the film has an approval rating of 20%, based on reviews from 5 critics, with an average rating of 3.9/10.

Styna Chyn, from Film Threat, wrote: "Even though Jackie Chan did not direct "The Myth," (Stanley Tong), he did produce it; and his creative input echoes throughout this genre-bending action film. Shot in China, Hong Kong, and Hampi, India, "The Myth" is a comedy of epic proportions. Combining historical fantasy, martial arts, and science-fiction, Tong's film follows archaeologist Jack (Jackie Chan) and scientist William (Tony Leung Ka-Fai) on their adventures in investigating the veracity of a myth involving immortality, levitation, and a Korean princess-turned-concubine for Emperor Qin towards the end of the Qin Dynasty."

David Cornelius, from efilmcritic, gave the film 4 out of 5 stars and wrote: "Once again, it’s time to lament that while Jackie Chan has spent the past few years churning out mostly mediocre-or-worse flops like "Around the World in 80 Days" or those damn "Rush Hour" sequels in Hollywood, he's also spent the same time flying back home every now and then to make some darn-good-or-better flicks that, sadly, remain mostly unseen Stateside because they've been unceremoniously dumped onto DVD by the studios that pick up the rights to them but then never really bother to do anything about it."

Jim Hemphill, from Reel Films Reviews, gave the film 4 out of 5 stars and wrote a positive review: "Jackie Chan's The Myth is enjoyable but second-rate Jackie Chan, an action film that's completely satisfying on every level except when compared to the star's own best work. Chan has, in some ways, become a victim of his own excellence: the astonishing stunt work and action choreography of his peak years (the 1980s period of the Police Story and Project A films) have set up expectations that no performer could continue to live up to, certainly not after moving into middle age. Viewers weaned on Chan's classics will undoubtedly find The Myth to be Jackie-lite, a slightly slowed-down version of his usual acrobatics. Yet the film does contain a few superb set pieces reminiscent of vintage Chan, and director Stanley Tong's opulent visual style makes it a feast for the eyes—and the bottom line is that half-speed Jackie Chan is still more dynamic than just about any other action hero."

Robert Koehler of Variety wrote a generally negative review of the film: "Resembling a story session where many ideas are brainstormed and few stick, The Myth messily reps Jackie Chan in epic mode as a [contemporary] archaeologist drawn into a plot to plunder the treasure of the Qin Dynasty's first emperor. As part of a movement in H.K. cinema to return to the ambitious movies of yore, helmer Stanley Tong's multi-period adventure flirts with considerable entertainment on one hand and near self-destruction on the other. Whether Chan's star power will pull in enough international bizbiz is doubtful, though ancillary should flex muscles in most territories."

David Nusair, writing for Reel Film Reviews from the 2005 Toronto International Film Festival, was even less impressed: "That The Myth eventually turns into an almost interminable experience is a shame, given the light-hearted and genuinely entertaining vibe of the film's opening hour...Fortunately, The Myth contains several expectedly impressive action sequences – with a fight set within a rat paper factory an obvious highlight – although it's not long before such moments wear out their welcome. This is particularly true of an unbelievably tedious plot development towards the end, which finds all of the film's central characters forced to duke it out inside some kind of an infinite, gravity-defying mausoleum (!) Chan is reportedly looking to get away from some of the sillier films he's been churning out as of late, but The Myth certainly does not mark a step in the right direction".

=== Home media ===
On 4 May 2009, the DVD was released in Cine Asia in the United Kingdom in Region 2. Another version, including "An Introduction to Cine Asia Featurette", was released later in the United Kingdom on 28 February 2011.

== Theme song ==
The theme song for the film, titled Wujin De Ai (無盡的愛; Endless Love) was performed in both Mandarin and Korean by Jackie Chan and Kim Hee-sun. Chan's stanzas were all sung in Mandarin, while Kim's solo stanzas were sung in Korean. However, the duets were all sung in Mandarin. The song was written by composer Choi Joon Young.

An alternative version, titled Meili De Shenhua (美麗的神話; Beautiful Myth), was performed in Mandarin by Sun Nan and Han Hong.

The song was reused as the ending theme song for the 2010 television series of the same title. This version was performed in Mandarin by Hu Ge and Bai Bing.

== Action team ==
The Kalaripayattu martial arts were performed by experts from C. V. N. Kalari school, led by Sunil Kumar Gurukkal, and based in the town of Nadakkavu, Calicut in the state of Kerala, India. The list of stunt performers includes: John Foo, Wu Gang, Han Kwan Hua, Lee in Seob, Ken Lo, Park Hyun Jin and William Dewsbury.

== Television series ==
On 10 January 2010, a 50 episodes television series, titled The Myth, was broadcast on CCTV-8 in China. Jackie Chan was the producer for the series while Stanley Tong was the creative director. The television series had a storyline that is different from the film.

== See also ==
- Jackie Chan filmography
- List of Hong Kong films
- List of martial arts films
- Kalaripayattu
