= East Wing West Wing =

East Wing West Wing (Chinese: 東宮西宮) is a Hong Kong theatrical drama series produced by Zuni Icosahedron, Edward Lam and Mathias Woo. The drama is a comedic and ironic criticism of Hong Kong politics, which the Hong Kong Economic Journal called a rarity.

Shows have been performed at Hong Kong Arts Centre and Kwai Tsing Theatre. The fourth season of the shows in 2005 was performed at Kwai Tsing Theatre. By 2007, there had been five editions amounting to over 90 theatrical showings.

== Reception ==
The Hong Kong Economic Journal said the show "often leaves the audience delighted and applauding enthusiastically on the spot". In a positive review, the Hong Kong Economic Times said, "Blending stand-up comedy, crosstalk, absurdist theater, and sitcom-style humor, the show gave everyone a chance to laugh together at the frustrations, helplessness, and absurdities of reality." In the Asian Theatre Journal Kay Li said the production had a "very local and temporal" appeal and thought that the "monologue or dialogue is loaded with puns and allusions and is delivered rapidly". In a 2014 review, Kevin Kwong of the South China Morning Post reflected that East Wing West Wing has year after year maintained its "sardonic edge, biting wit and intelligent humour".

== Episodes ==
1. 2046 CE Bye Bye (2002)
2. Reloaded (2002, re-run in 2003)
3. Mic On!!! Mic Off!!! (2004)
4. West Kowloon Side Story (2005)
5. 2097 Back to the Ching Chiu (2007)
6. Rainbow Judge Pao (2008)
7. Hong Kong Civil Servant Death Note (2008)
8. West Kowloon Dragon Ball (2009)
9. Sap Dai Kau Goon (2010)
10. Les Missréblse Hong Kong (2013)
11. Find Ghost Do The CE (2014)
12. Let It Be One Country Two Systems (2015)
13. My Aspiration (2017)
14. When There Is No Police (2017)

== TV version ==
The East Wing West Wing television version was first aired on ATV Home at 10:00 pm on 26 June 2011 with a total of 13 episodes.
