= Albert Yeung =

Hong Kong businessman (born 1943)

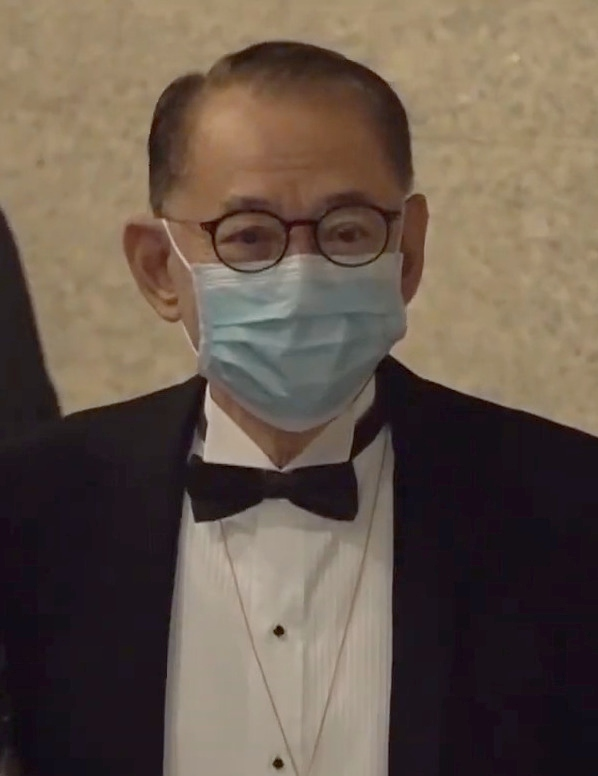
- Born: Yeung Sau Shing; 3 March 1943 (age 83); Hong Kong
- Education: New Method College
- Occupation: Entrepreneur
- Years active: 1964–present
- Known for: Chairman of the Emperor Group
- Spouses: Yam Man Ling (m. 1969–1979) Luk Siu Man (m. 1985)
- Children: Cindy Yeung; Daisy Yeung; Gilbert Yeung; Alexander Yeung
- Relatives: Vincy Yeung (niece); Alfred Cheung (son-in-law)

Albert Yeung
- Traditional Chinese: 楊受成
- Simplified Chinese: 杨受成
Transcriptions
Standard Mandarin
- Hanyu Pinyin: Yáng Shòuchéng

Albert Yeung Sau-shing (Chinese: 楊受成; born 3 March 1943) is a Hong Kong businessman. He is the founder and chairman of Emperor Group.

== Early years ==
Albert Yeung was born in Hong Kong in 1943 and traces his roots to Teochew (Chaozhou), Guangdong, China. His father, Mr Yeung Shing, opened a watch shop named "Shing On Kee Watch Shop" in 1942, setting the business foundation. In the 1960s his father lent him 200,000 yuan to start his watch business. In 1964, he opened his own watch shop, "Observatory Watch & Jewellery" on Nathan Road, Kowloon.

Two years after he opened his first shop, he obtained the distribution rights of Rolex and Omega watches and expanded his business to jewellery in 1966 and later on to other ventures. He was soon successful and became known as the "King of clocks and watches" (鐘錶大王).

== Business career ==
Yeung is the founder and chairman of the Emperor Group, a diversified group of listed companies that includes financial services, property, watch and jewellery, entertainment and films, hospitality, publishing and printing, furniture as well as catering.

== Family background ==
Yeung has two sons and three daughters. His two sons and three daughters are also involved in business.

== Community services and charity work ==
Yeung was the Charter President of "Lion Club of South Kowloon" in 1976. In 2008, Yeung set up "Albert Yeung Sau Shing Charity Foundation", which is dedicated to supporting non-profit sports, as well as educational and cultural activities.

Yeung donated nearly $20 million to relieve efforts after the Sichuan earthquake of May 2008. To recognise Beijing Olympic gold medalists' contributions to sports development in China, he also awarded $12.6 million to the 63 athletes.

The Jackie Chan and Albert Yeung Charity Foundation, founded by Chan and Yeung, donated RMB 10 million to the Ministry of Civil Affairs of the PRC as a special fund to support the relief efforts after the earthquake in Wenchuan County, Sichuan Province in May 2008.

=== Charitable foundation ===
In addition to setting up "Emperor Foundation Scholarship" for twelve tertiary institutions in Hong Kong, Yeung has made donations to education funds in China, including the "Ministry of Justice, PRC Education Fund", the "China University of Political Science and Law – C.U.P.L. Mr Albert Yeung Education Fund", the "Peking University Education Foundation" and "Xiamen Education Fund" for students with top academic achievements or underprivileged background. He also invested and donated RMB 30 million to establish "Shanghai Institute of Visual Art, Fudan University – The Emperor School of Performing Arts" to cultivate new talents in China.

=== Hong Kong ===
Yeung's charity works in Hong Kong include "Business Community Relief Fund for Victims of SARS" in 2003, "Together we care, Love for South Asia" Charity Show in 2005, "Walk for Hospice" in 2009 and "A Feast of Tastes 2010". The beneficiaries included The Community Chest, Tung Wah Group of Hospitals, World Vision of Hong Kong, Hong Kong Red Cross, the Society for the Promotion of Hospice Care and St. James' Settlement.

=== Mainland ===
In 2007, on the occasion of the 10th anniversary of Hong Kong's return to China, Yeung contributed more than HKD 4 million to the official celebration event "Harbour Extravaganza", a firework display and gala dinner. He has been making donations to various foundations in China amounting to nearly HKD 200 million. His donations set up "Tung Wah Group Yeung Sing Memorial Long Stay Care Home" (1998), the "Jackie Chan and Albert Yeung Charity Foundation Baoding Child Care Centre" (2004), the "Hubei Hong Kong Emperor Elderly Care Centre", the "Jackie Chan and Albert Yeung Charity Foundation Baoding Elderly Care Centre" (2006), the "Albert Yeung Sau Shing Charity Foundation (Shunping) Elderly Care Centre" (2009) and the "Albert Yeung Sau Shing Charity Foundation (Xiongzhou) Elderly Care Centre" (2010). He funded hospice services in Hubei, which made him win "The Most Influential Charity Project Nomination Award" in 2007.

Cash awards totalling over RMB 10 million were also granted to Chinese gold medalists of 2008 Beijing Olympics.

== Court cases ==
=== Perverting the course of public justice conviction (1979) ===
On 10 February 1979, jockey Tony Cruz (Chinese: 告東尼), his brother and two other persons had an argument in a car park in the New Territories with Wai Kin-bong, who was knocked unconscious and hospitalised until 28 February. Wai was then Director and general manager of Tin Tin Daily News. The paper's owner Lau Tin-chau asked Yeung, a common friend of both Cruz and Wai, to try to resolve the tension between the two. Yeung visited Wai in hospital and offered him a "very substantial sum" of money either "not to give evidence against Mr. Cruz or to give evidence that would not 'nail him down'". In circumstances where the magistrate found that Yeung had promised Wai he would "fix the police", Cruz was never charged. Yeung was convicted of perverting the course of justice and ultimately sentenced to nine months' imprisonment.

=== Insider dealing (1993) ===
After a ten-day trial, on 8 June 1998, High Court judge Mr Justice Burrell, sitting as the Chairman of the Insider Dealing Tribunal together with two members, found Yeung culpable of insider dealing in shares of his listed Emperor (China Concept) Investments Ltd in October 1993. He was ordered to pay a total of HK$20,693,433 in fines and costs.

=== Charged with criminal intimidation & false imprisonment (1994, acquitted 1995) ===
Yeung was acquitted after the case against him folded when five prosecution witnesses suffered amnesia, the first of whom told Magistrate Paul Kelly he did not want to give evidence against Yeung because he was "very frightened". The magistrate acquitted Yeung but said he "cannot, with the same assurance, declare justice has been done".

=== Defamation case against Google (2011) ===
On 8 August 2011 the South China Morning Post reported that Yeung had filed a writ for defamation against Google in the Hong Kong High Court on the grounds that it links to sites making libellous accusations against him.

== Honors ==
Year	Awards and Honor Titles
2017	Bestowed "Lifetime Achievement Award" at the 14th (2017) China's Charity Chart
	Elected as "Forbes Hong Kong's 50 Richest"
2016	Elected as "Top Ten Philanthropists on the China's Charity Chart 2016"
2016	Elected as "Forbes Hong Kong's 50 Richest"
2015	Elected as "Top Ten Philanthropists on the China's Charity Chart 2015"
2014	Elected as "Top Ten Philanthropists on the China's Charity Chart 2014"
2014	Elected as "Forbes Hong Kong's 50 Richest"
2013	Elected as "Top 10 Philanthropists 2013".
2013	Elected as "Forbes Hong Kong's 50 Richest"
2012	"The Most Caring Individual Donor Award – "China Charity Award" – PRC's Ministry of Civil Affairs
	Elected as "Top 10 Philanthropists 2012".
2011	Elected as "Top 10 Philanthropists 2011".
	"The Most Caring Individual Donor Award – "China Charity Award" – PRC's Ministry of Civil Affairs
2009	"The Most Caring Individual Donor Award – "China Charity Award" – PRC's Ministry of Civil Affairs
2008	"The World Chinese Charity Award", United World Chinese Association
	"The Most Caring Individual Donor Award – "China Charity Award" – PRC's Ministry of Civil Affairs
	"Honorary Professor" – Guangdong University of Finance
	"Director", "Honorary President", Shanghai Institute of Visual Art, Fudan University – The Emperor School of Performing Arts
2007	"China's Outstanding Charity Contribution Award","China's Charitable Person" – the China Charity Federation
	"Special Charity Award","China's Charity Chart 2007" – China Association of Social Workers
	"Life Honorary President", Social Workers Across Borders
	"Degree of Honorary Doctor of Commerce (Honoris Causiby)" – the University of West Alabama in the USA
	"World Outstanding Chinese Award", "Life Honorary President", United World Chinese Association
2006	"Life Honorary President" – Asian Basketball Association
2005	"China Charity Award" – the Ministry of Civil Affairs of China and the China Charity Federation
1998	"Honorary Trustee" – Peking University
1994	"Honorary Professor of Law" – China University of Political Science and Law
	"Honorary Consultant of All China Lawyers Association" – the All China Lawyers Association
1976	"Charter President", Lion Club of South Kowloon

== See also ==
- Emperor Entertainment Group
