= Mathias Woo =

Hong Kong playwright and artist (born 1968)

Mathias Woo Yan Wai
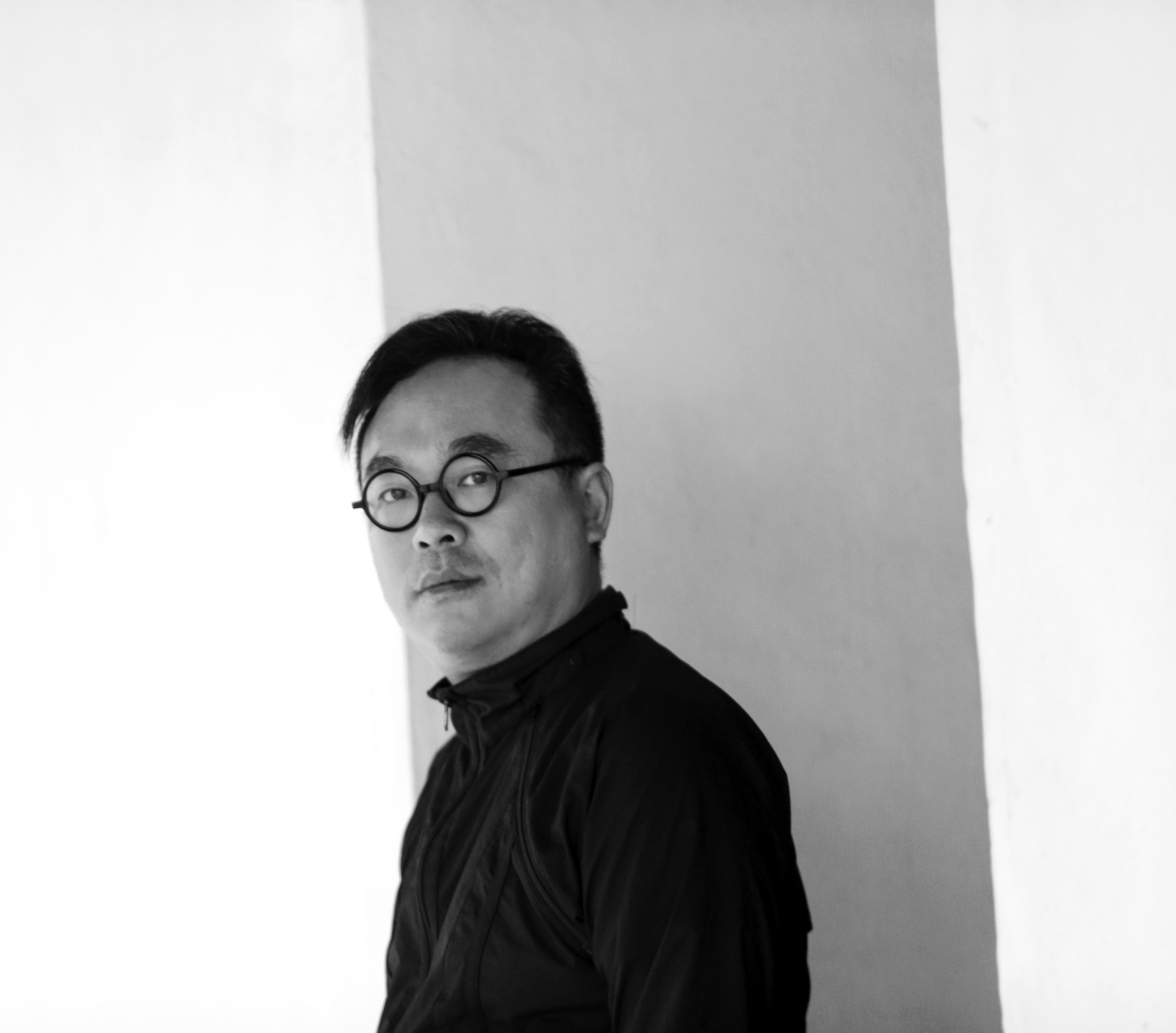
- Woo in November 2013
- Born: 1968 (age 57–58)
- Education: University of Hong Kong; Architectural Association School of Architecture
- Occupations: Playwright; Screenwriter; Artist
- Awards: 28th Hong Kong Film Awards - Best Screenplay

Mathias Woo Yan Wai (Chinese: 胡恩威; born 1968) is a Hong Kong playwright, screenwriter, and artist. He is the co-artistic director and executive director of the avant-garde art group Zuni Icosahedron. From 2011 to 2014 he was commissioned by Asia Television in Hong Kong to produce and host a series of current and political affairs TV talk shows, included I Want to Be Chief Executive and Asia Policy Unit,. He also produced and directed the political comedy East Wing West Wing TV in that period. In 2009 he founded Hong Kong's Architecture is Art Festival. In 2007, Happy Birthday, the screenplay Woo co-wrote with Sylvia Chang, was nominated as the Best Screenplay in the 26th Hong Kong Film Awards. In 2008, Run Papa Run, the screenplay Woo co-wrote with Chan Suk Yin and Sylvia Chang, was nominated as the Best Screenplay in the 28th Hong Kong Film Awards.
