= Willie Chan =

- Born: 22 May 1941; Malaysia
- Died: 24 October 2017 (aged 76); Hong Kong
- Occupations: Film producer Talent manager
- Years active: 1970–2017
- Awards: Hong Kong Film Awards – Professional Spirit Award; 2011

Chinese name
- Traditional Chinese: 陳自強
- Simplified Chinese: 陈自强
Transcriptions
Standard Mandarin
- Hanyu Pinyin: chén2 zì4 qiang2
Yue: Cantonese
- Jyutping: Can4 Zi6 Koeng4
Southern Min
- Hokkien POJ: Tân Chū-kiông
- Musical career
- Also known as: Chan Chi-Keung; Chen Ziqiang

William Chan Chi-Keung (Chinese: 陈自强; 22 May 1941 – 24 October 2017) was a Malaysian-born Hong Kong film producer and talent manager. He is best known for helping to establish the career of Jackie Chan, serving as his manager and later as the actor’s producing partner in both Asia and North America. He also managed the career of singer-rapper and actor Edison Chen.

== Career ==
Chan graduated from the East-West Center in Hawaii in 1966 with a master's degree in marketing. He later moved to Hong Kong from his native Malaysia in 1970 to pursue a career in the film industry. He was a talent scout and line producer in the mid-1970s when he met Jackie Chan, who was, at the time, a stuntman. Willie helped him to gain the leading role in Lo Wei's New Fist of Fury, which was released during the "Bruceploitation" era, but was not a movie of that kind, and was hailed as a "follow-up" to Bruce Lee's Fist of Fury. Willie had shown a keen interest in Jackie's willingness and ability to perform dangerous stunts.

This happened after Jackie, fed up with a stagnating career, moved to Australia for a few months to work as a painter for a construction company. Willie brought him back to work as a leading actor on the above-mentioned sequel for Lo's production company, "Lo Wei Motion Picture Company", a subsidiary of Golden Harvest. The films, which included Snake & Crane Arts of Shaolin, were not financially successful. Jackie was then loaned to a different producer, Ng See-yuen, who launched his career with Snake in the Eagle's Shadow and Drunken Master. Willie then left the company to join Golden Harvest, with Willie serving as Chan's personal manager.

After Raymond Chow established Jackie's career with The Young Master, Jackie went to the United States, attempting to make a career move in the American film market, while studying English at the Berlitz Language School with Willie Chan.

After Jackie’s unsuccessful career in the United States, Willie returned to Hong Kong with an interest in artist management. In 1985, he formed The JC Group, and at its peak of success, the company had 43 actors on its books. In the 1990s, the triads began to gain a strong influence in the Hong Kong film industry, forcing Willie to join marches against gangsterism in the industry.

=== Later years ===
In later years, Willie Chan served as a producing partner for Jackie Chan's JCE Movies Limited. He worked alongside Jackie in his career in both Asia and North America. In 2006, he stepped away from being Jackie's manager, letting Jackie's wife, Joan Lin, take over. Willie was honored at the 30th Hong Kong Film Awards for professional achievement by Jackie and some of the clients Willie managed.

Chan died in his sleep in Hong Kong at age 76. Chan was ultimately cremated, and his funeral was held on November 23, with film industry people like Jackie Chan, Raymond Chow, and Jacky Cheung being his pallbearers.
